= Christopher Hitchens bibliography =

Books and other publications by Christopher Hitchens

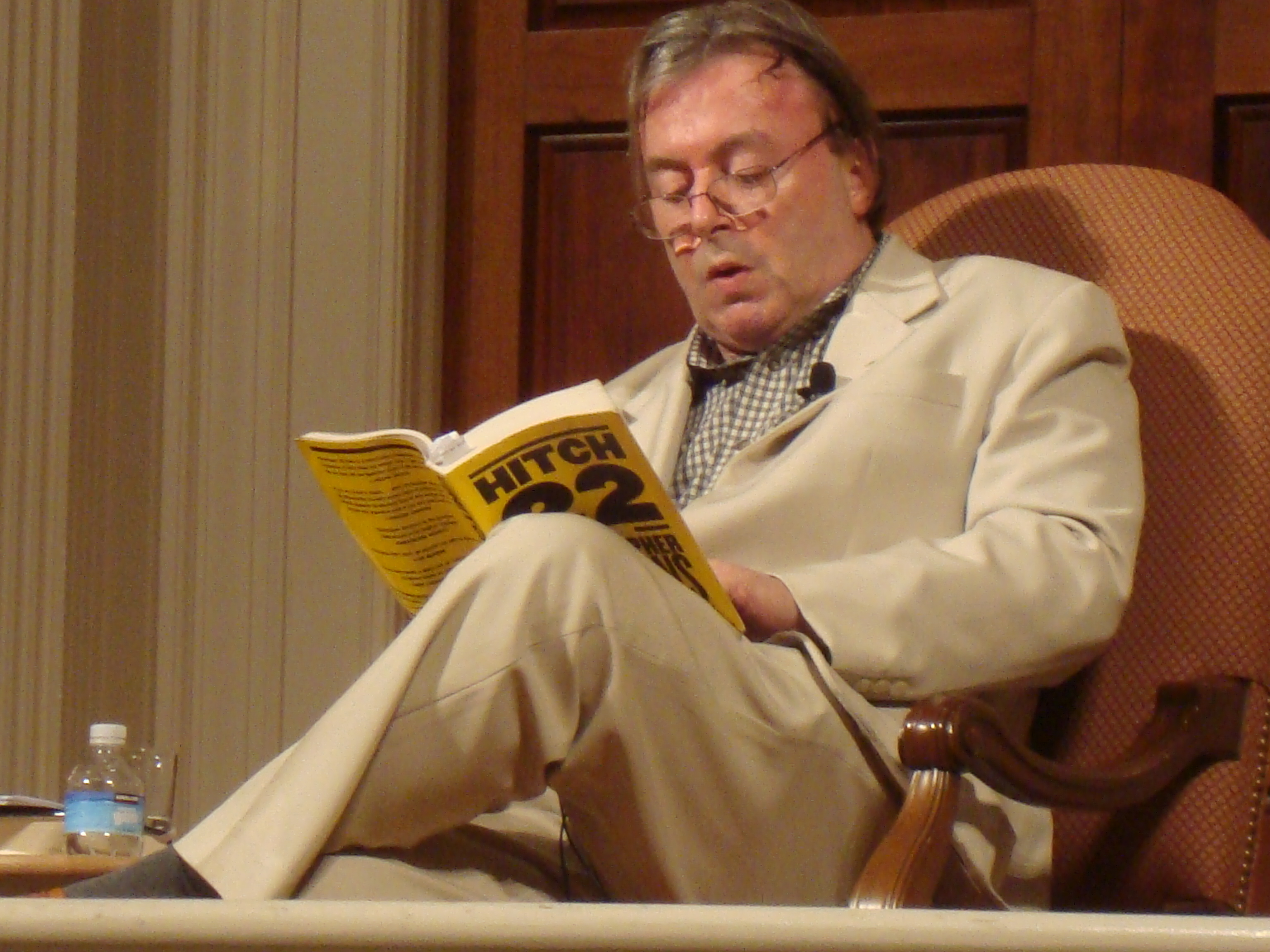
Christopher Hitchens reading his book Hitch-22 (2010)

Christopher Hitchens (13 April 1949 – 15 December 2011) was a prolific British and American author, political journalist and literary critic. His books, essays, and journalistic career spanned more than four decades. Recognized as a public intellectual, he was a staple of talk shows and lecture circuits. Hitchens was a columnist and literary critic at The Atlantic, Vanity Fair, Slate, World Affairs, The Nation, Free Inquiry, and a variety of other media outlets.

== Books ==
=== Sole author ===
External videos
- Washington Journal interview with Hitchens on No One Left To Lie To, April 30, 1999, C-SPAN
- Presentation by Hitchens on The Trial of Henry Kissinger, June 28, 2001, C-SPAN
- Washington Journal interview with Hitchens on Letters to a Young Contrarian, November 11, 2001, C-SPAN
- Presentation by Hitchens on Thomas Jefferson: Author of America, June 17, 2005, C-SPAN
- Presentation by Hitchens on Thomas Jefferson: Author of America, May 6, 2006, C-SPAN
- Interview with Hitchens on Hitch-22, May 27, 2010, C-SPAN

- 1984 Cyprus. Quartet. Revised editions as Hostage to History: Cyprus from the Ottomans to Kissinger, 1989 (Farrar, Straus & Giroux) and 1997 (Verso). ISBN 978-0-704-32436-7
- 1987 Imperial Spoils: The Curious Case of the Elgin Marbles. Chatto and Windus (UK)/Hill and Wang (US, 1988) / 1997 UK Verso edition as The Elgin Marbles: Should They Be Returned to Greece? (with essays by Robert Browning and Graham Binns). Reissued and updated 2008 as The Parthenon Marbles: The Case for Reunification, Verso. ISBN 978-0-809-04189-3
- 1990 Blood, Class, and Nostalgia: Anglo-American Ironies. Farrar, Straus & Giroux. Reissued 2004, with a new introduction, as Blood, Class and Empire: The Enduring Anglo-American Relationship, Nation Books, ISBN 1-56025-592-7
- 1999 No One Left to Lie To: The Triangulations of William Jefferson Clinton. Verso. Reissued as No One Left to Lie To: The Values of the Worst Family in 2000. ISBN 978-1-859-84736-7
- 2001 The Trial of Henry Kissinger. Verso. ISBN 1-85984-631-9
- 2001 Letters to a Young Contrarian. Basic Books. ISBN 0-465-03033-5
- 2002 Why Orwell Matters, Basic Books ISBN 0-465-03050-5. (US edition)

- as UK edition: Orwell's Victory, Allen Lane/Penguin Press. ISBN 0-713-99-584-X

- 2005 Thomas Jefferson: Author of America. Eminent Lives/Atlas Books/HarperCollins Publishers, ISBN 0-06-059896-4
- 2006 Thomas Paine's "Rights of Man": A Biography. Books That Shook the World/Atlantic Books, ISBN 1-84354-513-6
- 2007 God Is Not Great: How Religion Poisons Everything. Twelve/Hachette Book Group USA/Warner Books, ISBN 0-446-57980-7 / Published in the UK as God Is Not Great: The Case Against Religion. Atlantic Books, ISBN 978-1-84354-586-6
- 2010 Hitch-22 Some Confessions and Contradictions: A Memoir . Hachette Book Group. ISBN 978-0-446-54033-9 (published by Allen and Unwin in Australia in May 2010 with the shorter title: Hitch-22. A Memoir.) ISBN 978-1-74175-962-4
- 2012 Mortality. Atlantic. ISBN 978-1-4555-0275-2

=== Pamphlets ===
- 1971 Karl Marx and The Paris Commune. Sidgwick & Jackson Ltd. ISBN 0283484829
- 1990 The Monarchy: A Critique of Britain's Favourite Fetish. Chatto & Windus, 1990.
- 1995 The Missionary Position: Mother Teresa in Theory and Practice. Verso.
- 2003 A Long Short War: The Postponed Liberation of Iraq. Plume Books. Originally released as Regime Change (Penguin).
- 2011 The Enemy. Amazon Digital Services.

=== Essays ===
External videos
- Booknotes interview with Hitchens on For the Sake of Argument, October 17, 1993, C-SPAN

- 1988 Prepared for the Worst: Selected Essays and Minority Reports. Hill and Wang (US)/Chatto and Windus (UK).
- 1993 For the Sake of Argument: Essays and Minority Reports. Verso, ISBN 0-86091-435-6
- 2000 Unacknowledged Legislation: Writers in the Public Sphere. Verso
- 2004 Love, Poverty, and War: Journeys and Essays. Thunder's Mouth, Nation Books, ISBN 1-56025-580-3
- 2011 Arguably: Essays by Christopher Hitchens. Twelve. UK edition as Arguably: Selected Prose. Atlantic.
- 2015 And Yet... Essays, Simon & Schuster.
- 2021 A Hitch in Time: Writings from the London Review of Books, Atlantic Books, ISBN 978-1-838956-00-4
- 2024 A Hitch in Time: Reflections Ready for Reconsideration, Twelve, ISBN 978-1538757659

=== Collaborations ===
- 1976 Callaghan, The Road to Number Ten (with Peter Kellner). Cassell, ISBN 0-304-29768-2
- 1988 Blaming the Victims: Spurious Scholarship and the Palestinian Question (contributor; co-editor with Edward Said). Verso, ISBN 0-86091-887-4. Reissued, 2001.
- 1994 When Borders Bleed: The Struggle of the Kurds (with Ed Kashi). Pantheon Books.
- 1994 International Territory: The United Nations, 1945-1995 (with Adam Bartos). Verso.
- 2000 Vanity Fair's Hollywood, Graydon Carter and David Friend (editors). Viking Studio.
- 2019 The Four Horsemen: The Discussion that Sparked an Atheist Revolution, (with Richard Dawkins, Sam Harris, Daniel Dennett, and Stephen Fry). Bantam Press.

=== Co-author or co-editor ===
- 2002 Left Hooks, Right Crosses: A Decade of Political Writing (co-editor, with Christopher Caldwell).
- 2007 The Portable Atheist: Essential Readings for the Non-Believer. Perseus Publishing. ISBN 978-0-306-81608-6 (editor)
- 2008 Is Christianity Good for the World? – A Debate (co-author, with Douglas Wilson). Canon Press, ISBN 1-59128-053-2.
- 2008 Christopher Hitchens and His Critics: Terror, Iraq and the Left (co-author, with other contributions edited by Simon Cottee and Thomas Cushman ). New York University Press.
- 2010 The Best American Essays 2010 (co-editor with Robert Atwan). Mariner Books.
- 2011 Hitchens vs. Blair: Be it Resolved, Religion is a Force of Good in the World (co-author with Tony Blair). House of Anansi Press.

=== Contributor ===
- 2005 Religion, Culture, and International Conflict: A Conversation, Michael Cromartie (editor). Rowman & Littlefield.
- 2005 A Matter of Principle: Humanitarian Arguments for War in Iraq, Thomas Cushman (editor). University of California Press, ISBN 0-520-24555-5
- 2011 The Quotable Hitchens: From Alcohol to Zionism, Windsor Mann (editor). Da Capo Press.

== Book introductions, forewords and prefaces ==
- 1971 Karl Marx and the Paris Commune, Karl Marx and Friedrich Engels (authors). Introduction. Sidgwick & Jackson Ltd.
- 1990 The False Prophet: Rabbi Meir Kahane - From FBI Informant to Knesset Member, Robert I. Friedman (author). Foreword. Faber and Faber.
- 1992 Money for Old Rope, Charles Glass (author). Introduction. Picador.
- 1992 The Greek Socialist Experiment - Papandreou's Greece 1981-1989, Theodore C. Kariotis (editor). Introduction. Pella.
- 1994 When the Borders Bleed: The Struggle of the Kurds, Ed Kashi (author). Introduction. Pantheon.
- 1996 Peace And Its Discontents: Essays on Palestine in the Middle East Peace Process, Edward Said (author). Preface. Vintage.
- 1996 American Notes, Charles Dickens (author). Introduction. Modern Library.
- 1997 In Our Time: The Chamberlain-Hitler Collusion, Clement Leibovitz and Alvin Finkel (authors). Foreword to Paperback Edition. Monthly Review Press.
- 1997 Open Secrets: Israeli Foreign and Nuclear Policies, Israel Shahak (author), Pluto Press, London, . Foreword to paperback edition.
- 1999 A Handbook on Hanging, Charles Duff (author). Introduction. New York Review of Books.
- 2000 Scoop, Evelyn Waugh (author). Introduction. Penguin Classics Edition.
- 2000 Safe Area Goražde: The War in Eastern Bosnia 1992-1995, Joe Sacco (author). Foreword. Fantagraphics Books.
- 2000 1968: War & Democracy, Eugene J. McCarthy (author). Foreword. Lone Oak Press.
- 2000 Vanity Fair's Hollywood, Graydon Carter and David Friend (editors). Introduction. Viking Studio.
- 2001 Kosovo: Background to a War, Stephen Schwartz (author). Foreword. Anthem Press.
- 2001 The Mating Season, P. G. Wodehouse (author). Introduction. Penguin Classics Edition.
- 2001 Orwell in Spain, George Orwell (author), Peter Davison (editor). Introduction. Penguin Classics Edition
- 2002 Machinery of Death: The Reality of America's Death Penalty Regime, David R. Dow and Mark Dow (editors). Foreword. Routledge.
- 2002 From Russia, With Love, Dr. No, and Goldfinger, Ian Fleming (author). Introduction. Penguin Classics Edition.
- 2003 Animal Farm and 1984, George Orwell (author). Introduction. Houghton Mifflin Harcourt.
- 2003 The Adventures of Augie March, Saul Bellow (author). Introduction. Penguin Group.
- 2004 Orient Express, Graham Greene (author). Introduction. Penguin Classics Edition.
- 2004 Hons and Rebels, Jessica Mitford (author). Introduction. New York Review of Books.
- 2004 Brave New World, Aldous Huxley (author). Foreword. HarperCollins.
- 2004 Choice: The Best of Reason, Nick Gillespie (editor). Foreword. BenBella Books.
- 2005 House of the Spirits, Isabel Allende (author). Introduction. Everyman's Library.
- 2007 Our Man in Havana, Graham Greene (author). Introduction. Penguin Classics Edition.
- 2007 Black Lamb and Grey Falcon: A Journey Through Yugoslavia, Rebecca West (author). Introduction. Penguin Classics Edition.
- 2008 Everyday Drinking: The Distilled Kingsley Amis, Kingsley Amis (author). Introduction. Bloomsbury USA.
- 2008 God: The Failed Hypothesis- How Science Shows that God Does Not Exist, Victor J. Stenger (author). Foreword to Paperback Edition. New York: Prometheus Books.
- 2008 Infidel, Ayaan Hirsi Ali (author). Introduction to Paperback Edition. Simon and Schuster.
- 2009 First in Peace: How George Washington Set the Course for America, Conor Cruise O'Brien (author). Introduction. Da Capo Press.
- 2009 Ancient Gonzo Wisdom: Interviews with Hunter S. Thompson, Anita Thompson (editor). Introduction to Paperback Edition. Da Capo Press.
- 2009 Certitude: A Profusely Illustrated Guide to Blockheads and Bullheads, Past and Present, Adam Begley (author), Edward Sorel (Illustrator). Introduction. Crown Archetype.
- 2010 The Three Hostages, John Buchan (author). Introduction. Polygon.
- 2010 Against Religion: The Atheist Writings of H.P. Lovecraft, H.P. Lovecraft (author), S. T. Joshi (editor). Foreword. Sporting Gentlemen.
- 2010 The Sixties: Diaries:1960-1969, Christopher Isherwood (author). Foreword. Harper.
- 2010 Civilization and Its Discontents, Sigmund Freud (author). Introduction. Norton, W. W. & Company, Inc.
- 2012 Diaries, George Orwell (author). Introduction. Liverlight.

== Book reviews ==
Year	Review article	Work(s) reviewed
2009	"The man in full". The Atlantic. 303 (5): 83–87. June 2009.	Hemingway, Ernest (2009). A moveable feast : the restored edition. Scribner. ISBN 9781416591313.
2009	"The zealot : Arthur Koestler's manic intellectual career". The Atlantic. 304 (5): 103–107. December 2009.	Scammell, Michael. Koestler : the literary and political odyssey of a Twentieth-Century sceptic. Random House.

== Dedicatee ==
Books dedicated to Hitchens:

- Richard Dawkins, Science in the Soul: Selected Writings of a Passionate Rationalist, Bantam Press, 2017 (ISBN 978-0-593-07751-1). "In memory of Christopher Hitchens".
