= Letters to a Young Contrarian =

Book by Christopher Hitchens

- Cover of the first edition
- Author: Christopher Hitchens
- Cover artist: Christian Witkin
- Language: English
- Publisher: Basic Books
- Publication date: November 2001
- Publication place: United States
- Media type: Print (Hardback & Paperback)
- Pages: 141
- ISBN: 0-465-03033-5
- OCLC: 60683604

Letters to a Young Contrarian is Christopher Hitchens' contribution, released in November 2001, to the Art of Mentoring series published by Basic Books.

Inspired by his students at The New School in New York City and "a challenge that was made to me in the early months of the year 2000," the book is addressed directly to the reader—"My Dear X" —as a series of missives exploring a range of "contrarian," radical, independent or "dissident" positions, and advocating the attitudes best suited to cultivating and to holding them. Hitchens touches on his own ideological development, the nature of debate and humour, the ways in which language is slyly manipulated in apology for offensive and ridiculous positions, and how to see through this and recognise it whenever it arises in oneself.

Throughout, Hitchens makes reference to those dissenters who have inspired him over the years, including Émile Zola, Rosa Parks, George Orwell, Fulke Greville, 1st Baron Brooke, and Václav Havel. The book also contains some of the critiques of religion and religious belief which Hitchens would later develop in his polemic God Is Not Great: How Religion Poisons Everything.

== Reception ==
In The New York Times Book Review, which compared Hitchens's efforts favourably with those of Alan Dershowitz (whose Letters to a Young Lawyer opened the series alongside them), Alexander Star offered a generally friendly critique. "At his best," he wrote, "Hitchens exhibits precisely the combination of indignation and intellect that he recommends to others." That said,

An idea's unpopularity does not make it true. Nor is it necessarily admirable or courageous to break with one's allies. Hitchens's endorsement of Kenneth Starr may have been boldly heterodox in his own circle, but it was heartily applauded in others. In the end, the romance of marginality can easily exceed its reasons. There is something awry when a well-rewarded columnist for Vanity Fair speaks of being "an exile or outcast on a remote shore." Ovid did not have an expense account.

The Village Voice's Joy Press, reviewing the book alongside Martin Amis's The War Against Cliché also tendered tempered praise:

Letters shows Hitchens's best and worst sides. A born contrarian, he makes entertaining mincemeat of self-satisfied politicians, and shreds received ideas and media-spun consensus with a fearlessness that is invaluable in our mealymouthed punditocracy. But there are times when that innate oppositional streak seems purely knee-jerk [...]. Hitchens's stridency and certainty will always be politically potent, but Amis's willingness to commit his vulnerability and confusion to the page ultimately makes him the more subtle and resonant writer. Letters is a primer on How to Be Christopher Hitchens. The War Against Cliché is a motley heap of literary judgments that nevertheless offers us a peek at the evolution of Martin Amis.

"Hitchens," noted The Progressive,

published his usual stack of important books during the course of 2001. Most noted was his case for the prosecution of Henry Kissinger for war crimes. History's least deserving Nobel Peace Prize recipient was forced to respond to Hitchens's proposal, and that alone could have made The Trial of Henry Kissinger the standout Hitchens text of the year. Yet, it is not. The finest book by Hitchens, and possibly the finest book of the year, is a short tome on how to assault contemporary hypocrisies by the man who has taken on every deity from Mother Teresa to Princess Di. Letters to a Young Contrarian [...] is a rough mix of autobiography and intellectual self-help advice. It is delicious because it showcases Hitchens at his most savage and wise (he reveals a warm spot for the under-appreciated utopian radicalism of William Morris and his circle). Above all, Letters to a Young Contrarian is necessary for its exploration of the role of the dissenter in a time of too much politeness. "Seek out argument and disputation for its own sake," Hitchens urges. "The grave will provide plenty of time for silence."
