= Prepared for the Worst =

Prepared for the Worst: Selected Essays and Minority Reports
- The cover of original hardcover 1st edition by Hill and Wang
- Author: Christopher Hitchens
- Language: English
- Publisher: Hill and Wang
- Publication date: 1988
- Publication place: United States
- Media type: Print (Hardback & Paperback)
- Pages: 357
- ISBN: 0809078678 (hardback edition)
- OCLC: 88010993
- Dewey Decimal: 973.927
- LC Class: E876 .H58 1988

Prepared for the Worst: Selected Essays and Minority Reports is a 1988 collection of essays by the author Christopher Hitchens that first appeared in British and American publications. These include Harpers, Times Literary Supplement, The Spectator, London Review of Books, The Nation, New Statesman and Society. The collection includes sections devoted to literary criticism, foreign reportage and political analysis.
