= Love, Poverty, and War =

2004 book by Christopher Hitchens

Love, Poverty, and War: Journeys and Essays
- Cover of the first edition
- Author: Christopher Hitchens
- Language: English
- Publisher: Nation Books
- Publication date: 2004
- Publication place: United States
- Media type: Print (Paperback)
- Pages: 475
- ISBN: 1-56025-580-3
- OCLC: 56991027
- Dewey Decimal: 306.2 22
- LC Class: JA75.7 .H58 2004

Love, Poverty, and War: Journeys and Essays is a collection of essays and reportage by the author, journalist, and literary critic Christopher Hitchens. The title of the book is explained in the introduction, which informs the reader that "an antique saying has it that a man's life is incomplete unless or until he has tasted love, poverty, and war."

The "Love" section includes essays on some of Hitchens's favourite literary figures: Evelyn Waugh, James Joyce, Leon Trotsky and Rudyard Kipling; "Poverty" includes critiques of the likes of Mother Teresa, Michael Moore, Mel Gibson and David Irving; while "War" is divided into the sections "Before September" and "After September", the latter showing Hitchens' reaction to the September 11 attacks. As Colm Tóibín observes in his review, "the book is overshadowed by that day and by Hitchens's response to it." It was, in Hitchens's words, "a condensed day of love, poverty, and war, all right."

== Reception ==
Love, Poverty, and War was praised in Kirkus Reviews as "a well-turned collection with scarcely a false note", with the author's "fierce and nuanced patriotism in the wake of 9/11" singled out. In The Daily Telegraph, Robert Douglas-Fairhurst billed Hitchens as "the charging rhinoceros of English letters" and wrote that although "pieces generated by the heat and smoke of 9/11 jostle with slighter essays on Bob Dylan and the masturbatory excesses of Ulysses [...] there are times when Hitchens writes so well that you would forgive him almost anything." Douglas-Fairhurst also praised the author's "willingness to say the unsayable".

James Ley of The Sydney Morning Herald, while stating that "there is much about Hitchens's support for Bush that still sits oddly", nevertheless lauded the work as "probably the best all-round selection of [Hitchens's] writings yet published. [...] Hitchens is an effortlessly engaging writer and a famously pugnacious commentator, but the sheer scope of Love, Poverty and War is testament to his erudition. There are few writers who can turn from a long and detailed reassessment of the legacy of Winston Churchill to the work of Marcel Proust and feel equally at home." In Prospect, David Herman argued that the collection solidified Hitchens as "one of the best literary and cultural critics of the past 20 years", praising the author's writings on Rudyard Kipling, Marcel Proust, and The Adventures of Augie March. David Free of The Australian wrote that the essays written in the wake of the September 11 attacks "will go down as classics of American journalism."

Colm Toibin of The New York Times was mildly positive toward the work. Despite viewing the two articles about the author's trips to Pakistan and Iraq as low points in the author's career, Toibin called the overall collection an "interesting and varied showcase of his work as a polemicist, a reporter and a literary critic". Toibin especially praised the article about the lethal injection of a Vietnam War veteran and argued that Hitchens can sometimes "write as well as George Orwell."
