= Triangulation (politics) =

Using ideas of the opposition

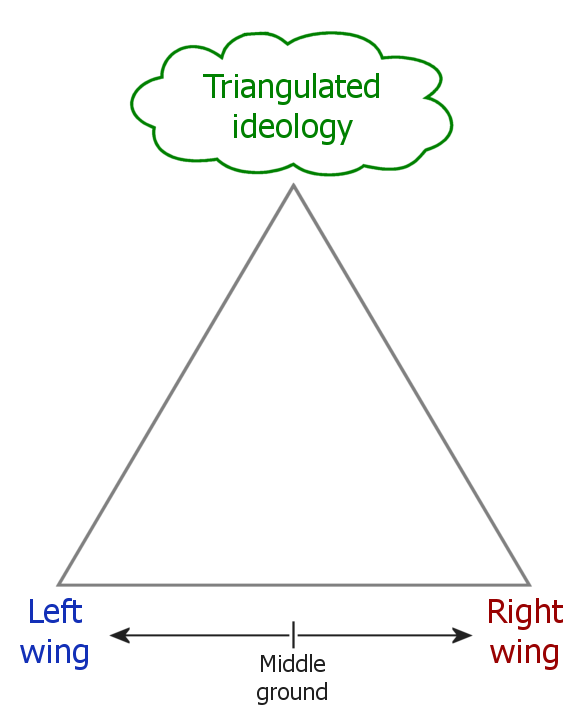
A conceptual diagram illustrating political triangulation

In politics, triangulation is a strategy associated with U.S. President Bill Clinton in the 1990s. The politician presents a position as being above or between the left and right sides or wings of a democratic political spectrum. It involves adopting for oneself some of the ideas of one's political opponent. The logic behind it is that it both takes credit for the opponent's ideas, and insulates the triangulator from attacks on that particular issue.

== Origins ==
The use of the old term was first used by Clinton's chief political advisor Dick Morris as a way to describe his strategy for getting Clinton reelected in the 1996 U.S. presidential election. The opposition Republicans had scored a landslide to take control of Congress in the 1994 U.S. elections. Clinton needed to pass and take credit for legislation by winning over a coalition of moderate Republicans and Democrats, abandoning the progressive Democrats he had previously worked with. In Morris' words, triangulation meant "the president needed to take a position that not only blended the best of each party's views but also transcended them to constitute a third force in the debate." It is also sometimes referred to as "Clintonian triangulation". Morris advocated a set of policies that were different from the traditional policies of the Democratic Party. These policies included deregulation and balanced budgets. One of the most widely cited capstones of Clinton's triangulation strategy was when, in his 1996 State of the Union Address, Clinton declared that the "era of big government is over".

Commentators sometimes speculated that Clinton's emphasis on entrepreneurship and the post-industrial sector was the co-option of conservative ideas first presented by Reagan Republicans in the 1980s. Brent Cebul argues that triangulation represented a traditional liberal effort to structure the economy with the goals of creating new jobs and at the same time producing fresh tax revenues that can support progressive policy innovations. Cebul argues that this tradition goes back to the local and state policies inspired by the New Deal, and the "supply-side liberalism" of the 1970s.

== Other use ==
Tony Blair's "New Labour" in the United Kingdom also is supportive of the triangulation, further Blair's politics shared similarities with New Times analysis, particularly in its rejection of traditional left-right divisions and its emphasis on pragmatic policy-making. Other politicians who are said to have used triangulation include U.S. President Barack Obama, former U.S. Secretary of State Hillary Clinton, Jean Chrétien and Paul Martin with the Liberal Party of Canada, Fredrik Reinfeldt with "The New Moderates" in Sweden, Bob Hawke, Paul Keating, and Kevin Rudd of the Australian Labor Party, Nicola Sturgeon of the Scottish National Party, and Emmanuel Macron, who became elected as President of France on a centrist platform aiming to be "neither left nor right". During the 2010 State of the Union Address, President Obama insisted that he would remain with his center-left agenda in the face of criticism rather than resort to triangulation.

== See also ==
- Economic policy of the Bill Clinton administration
- Median voter theorem
- No One Left to Lie To: The Triangulations of William Jefferson Clinton
- Radical centrism
- Sister Souljah moment
- Third Way

== Bibliography ==
=== Books ===
- Halstead, Ted; Lind, Michael (2002). The Radical Center: The Future of American Politics (1st e-book ed.). New York: Knopf Doubleday Publishing Group. ISBN 978-1-4000-3329-4 – via Google Books.
- Morris, Dick (1999). Behind the Oval Office: Getting Reelected Against All Odds (2nd ed.). Los Angeles: Renaissance Books. ISBN 978-1-5806-3053-5 – via Internet Archive.
- Nelson, Michael; Perry, Barbara A.; Riley, Russell L., eds. (2016). 42: Inside the Presidency of Bill Clinton. Miller Center of Public Affairs Books. Cornell University Press. ISBN 978-1-5017-0674-5. JSTOR 10.7591/j.ctt1d2dnk0 – via Google Books.
- Nesmith, Bruce F.; Quirk, Paul J. (2016). "Triangulation: Positioning and Leadership in Clinton's Domestic Policy". In Nelson, Michael; Perry, Barbara A.; Riley, Russell L. (eds.). 42: Inside the Presidency of Bill Clinton. Miller Center of Public Affairs Books. Cornell University Press. pp. 46–76. doi:10.7591/cornell/9780801454066.003.0002. ISBN 978-0-8014-5406-6. OCLC 966805027 – via Academic Oxford.
- Trende, Sean (2012). The Lost Majority: Why the Future of Government Is Up for Grabs — and Who Will Take It (1st ed.). New York: Palgrave Macmillan. ISBN 978-0-2301-1646-7 – via Internet Archive.

=== Journal ===
- Cebul, Brent (July 2019). "Supply-Side Liberalism: Fiscal Crisis, Post-Industrial Policy, and the Rise of the New Democrats" (PDF). Modern American History. 2 (02): 139–164. doi:10.1017/mah.2019.9. ISSN 2515-0456. Archived from the original on October 23, 2019 – via Cambridge University Press & Assessment.

=== News and web ===
- Dyer, Neville; Martin, Virginie (July 18, 2022). "Who is Emmanuel Macron? Cracking the riddle of France's divisive president". The Conversation.
- Feldmann, Linda (December 10, 2010). "How tax cut revolt helps Obama: It's a page from Clinton playbook". Christian Science Monitor. ISSN 0882-7729.
- Frei, Matt (February 3, 2010). "Matt Frei's diary: Groundhog Day". BBC News.
- Goldberg, Jonah (December 18, 2007). "Clintonian triangulation comes full circle". Los Angeles Times. ISSN 2165-1736.
- Sanger, David E. (January 29, 2010). "Where Clinton Turned Right, Obama Plowed Ahead". The New York Times. ISSN 1553-8095.
