= Arguably =

2011 book by Christopher Hitchens

Arguably: Essays
- Author: Christopher Hitchens
- Language: English
- Subject: Essays
- Publisher: Twelve, Atlantic Books (UK)
- Publication date: September 2011
- Publication place: United States
- Media type: Print (hardcover and paperback)
- Pages: 816 (first edition)
- ISBN: 978-1-4555-0277-6

Arguably: Essays is a 2011 book by Christopher Hitchens, comprising 107 essays on a variety of political and cultural topics. These essays were previously published in The Atlantic, City Journal, Foreign Affairs, The Guardian, Newsweek, the New Statesman, The New York Times Book Review, Slate, The Times Literary Supplement, The Wall Street Journal, The Weekly Standard, The Wilson Quarterly, and Vanity Fair. Arguably also includes introductions that Hitchens wrote for new editions of several classic books, such as Animal Farm and Our Man in Havana. Critics' reviews of the collection were largely positive.

== Reception ==
In a highly positive review, Fred Inglis of The Independent called Hitchens a "prose master" and lauded the author's skill as a polemicist, writing that various figures are "lined up, arraigned, swiftly appraised and, with a perfect and merciless justice, judged and sentenced." Inglis also praised the essays of literary criticism as "very well written, so funny and fluent, so loving and so pungent." In Kirkus Reviews it was written, "Sometimes his pieces concern passing matters, though they are seldom ephemeral themselves [...] Vintage Hitchens. Argumentative and sometimes just barely civil—another worthy collection from this most inquiring of inquirers."

Charles Foran of The Globe and Mail lauded Arguably as "750 pages of bright, witty, nearly always charged reportage and argument", and wrote that the work "lays the foundation for Hitchens's enduring relevance as an essayist and commentator." Bill Keller of The New York Times called Hitchens "our intellectual omnivore, exhilarating and infuriating, if not in equal parts at least with equal wit", describing his range as "extraordinary, both in breadth and in altitude." Nicholas Shakespeare of The Daily Telegraph praised the book as "tremendous" and wrote, "I can’t think of anyone who brings to such a diverse range of subjects Hitchens’s mobilising wit, intelligence and passion."

In the New Statesman, John Gray criticized Hitchens's views on 21st century terrorism and said the author sometimes "blanks out reality when it fails to accord with his faith", but nonetheless referred to Arguably as "the testament of a prodigiously gifted mind" and lauded him as "one of the greatest living writers of English prose", especially praising the essay "The Vietnam Syndrome". In a mixed review for The Observer, Fintan O'Toole called Hitchens a "supremely evocative reporter" and "the most readable journalist of his time", but accused the journalist of "huge but unargued claims" and warned, "There are many sad moments when thought has withered into vacuity or bombast, moments in which we can see what Hitchens might have become – just another purveyor of American super-patriotic orthodoxies." O'Toole concluded that Hitchens "emerges here [...] as a great journalist fallen, for a while, among neocons."

In 2016, James Ley of The Sydney Morning Herald listed Arguably among the collections from Hitchens that "[represent] the best of his work as a journalist, literary critic and cultural commentator."

== Awards and honors ==
- 2011 The New York Times Best Books of the Year
- 2012 PEN/Diamonstein-Spielvogel Award for the Art of the Essay, winner

== Books reviewed ==
- Moral Minority: Our Skeptical Founding Fathers, by Brooke Allen
- Jefferson's Secrets: Death and Desire at Monticello, by Andrew Burstein
- Power, Faith and Fantasy: America in the Middle East, 1776 to the Present, by Michael Oren
- Benjamin Franklin Unmasked, by Jerry Weinberger
- John Brown, Abolitionist, by David S. Reynolds
- Abraham Lincoln: A Life, by Michael Burlingame
- The Singular Mark Twain, by Fred Kaplan
- The Jungle, by Upton Sinclair
- An Unfinished Life: John F. Kennedy, 1917–1963, by Robert Dallek
- Novels 1944-1953: Dangling Man, The Victim, The Adventures of Augie March and Novels 1956-1964: Seize the Day, Henderson the Rain King, Herzog by Saul Bellow
- Lolita by Vladimir Nabokov and The Annotated Lolita, edited by Alfred Appel, Jr.
- Due Considerations: Essays and Criticism, by John Updike
- A History of the English-Speaking Peoples Since 1900, by Andrew Roberts
- Dominion: The Power of Man, the Suffering of Animals, and the Call to Mercy by Matthew Scully
- Wolf Hall, by Hilary Mantel
- Reflections on the Revolution in France, by Edmund Burke, edited by Frank W. Turner
- Samuel Johnson: A Biography, by Peter Martin
- Bouvard and Pecuchet by Gustave Flaubert, translated from French by Mark Polizotti
- Charles Dickens by Michael Slater
- Dispatches for the New York Tribune: Selected Journalism of Karl Marx, edited by James Ledbetter, with a foreword by Francis Wheen
- Ezra Pound: Poet, Vol 1. 1885-1920, by A. David Moody
- Decca: The Letters of Jessica Mitford, by Peter Y. Sussman
- Somerset Maugham: A Life, by Jeffrey Meyers
- Wodehouse: A Life, by Robert McCrum
- To Keep the Ball Rolling: The Memoirs of Anthony Powell
- John Buchan: The Presbyterian Cavalier, by Andrew Lownie
- The Life of Graham Greene, Vol II 1955-1991, by Norman Sherry
- Letters to Monica by Philip Larkin, edited by Anthony Thwaite
- Stephen Spender: The Authorized Biography, by John Sutherland
- C. L. R. James: Cricket, the Caribbean and the World Revolution, by Farrukh Dhondy
- The Complete Stories of J. G. Ballard
- The Unbearable Saki, by Sandie Byrne
- Harry Potter and the Deathly Hallows, by J. K. Rowling
- A Savage War of Peace: Algeria 1954-1962, by Alistair Horne
- Dangerous Knowledge: Orientalism and Its Discontents, by Robert Irwin
- Orientalism, by Edward Said
- Freedom's Battle: The Origins of Humanitarian Intervention, by Gary J. Bass
- The Case of Comrade Tulayev and Memoirs of a Revolutionary, by Victor Serge
- Malraux: A Life, by Olivier Todd
- Koestler: The Literary and Political Odyssey of a Twentieth-Century Skeptic, by Michael Scammell
- Strange Times, My Dear: The PEN Antholody of Contemporary Iranian Literature, edited by Nahid Mozzaffari
- Koba the Dread: Laughter and the Twenty Million, by Martin Amis
- Hitler: 1889-1936: Hubris, by Ian Kershaw
- The Lesser Evil: Diaries 1945-1959, by Victor Klemperer
- Churchill, Hitler and the Unnecessary War, by Pat Buchanan
- Human Smoke, by Nicholson Baker
- On the Natural History of Destruction, by W. G. Sebald

== Book introductions ==
- Black Lamb and Grey Falcon, by Rebecca West
- Animal Farm, by George Orwell
- Our Man in Havana, by Graham Greene
- The House of the Spirits, by Isabel Allende
