= American Zeitgeist =

- Film poster
- Directed by: Rob McGann
- Produced by: Rob McGann; Aaron Blasius (co-producer)
- Edited by: Deborah Barkow; Doug Rossini
- Music by: Ravi Krishnaswami
- Release date: 2006
- Running time: 116 minutes
- Country: United States
- Language: English

This movie could be found on YouTube in Canada when it first released in 2006. It is nowhere to be found on YouTube now, in Canada. Also information on Rob Mcgann is very limited. American Zeitgeist is a 2006 documentary film by Rob McGann. It discusses the war on terror and religion. It was the winner of the best feature-length documentary award at the Houston International Film Festival.

== Cast ==
- Tariq Ali
- Paul Berman
- Richard Bulliet
- Noam Chomsky
- Steve Coll
- Hamid Dabashi
- David Frum
- Christopher Hitchens
- Samantha Power
- Craig Unger
