= Imperial Spoils =

1987 book by Christopher Hitchens

Imperial Spoils: The Curious Case of the Elgin Marbles
- Author: Christopher Hitchens
- Language: English
- Subject: Elgin Marbles
- Publisher: Chatto and Windus (UK)/ Hill and Wang (US)
- Publication date: 1987 (UK) / 1988 (US)
- Publication place: United States
- Media type: Print (hardback & paperback)
- Pages: 137
- ISBN: 978-0-8090-4189-3

Imperial Spoils: The Curious Case of the Elgin Marbles is a 1987 book by Christopher Hitchens on the controversy surrounding the removal by Thomas Bruce, 7th Earl of Elgin of the Parthenon's sculptured friezes (which became known as the Elgin Marbles), and his subsequent sale of the Marbles to the British Museum. Hitchens examines the history of the artefacts and the question of whether they should be returned to Greece.
