= Unacknowledged Legislation =

Unacknowledged Legislation: Writers in the Public Sphere
- Unacknowledged Legislation: Writers in the Public Sphere by Christopher Hitchens
- Author: Christopher Hitchens
- Language: English
- Subject: Politics
- Publisher: Verso Books
- Publication date: 2000
- Publication place: United States; United Kingdom
- Media type: Print (hardcover and paperback)
- Pages: 358
- ISBN: 9781859847862
- Dewey Decimal: 820.9/358
- LC Class: PR478.P64 H58 2000

Unacknowledged Legislation: Writers in the Public Sphere is a collection of essays by the author and journalist Christopher Hitchens, published in 2000. It was first published in hardback by the New Left Books imprint, Verso.

== Synopsis ==
Described as a celebration of Percy Shelley's assertion that "poets are the unacknowledged legislators of the world," the book contains thirty-eight essays on writers such as Oscar Wilde, P. G. Wodehouse, George Orwell, Rudyard Kipling, Philip Larkin, H. L. Mencken, Anthony Powell, T. S. Eliot and Salman Rushdie, in which Hitchens attempts to "dispel the myth of politics as a stone tied to the neck of literature".

== Reception ==
In 2016, James Ley of The Sydney Morning Herald listed Unacknowledged Legislation among the books from Hitchens that "[represent] the best of his work as a journalist, literary critic and cultural commentator."

== See also ==
- The arts and politics
