= Frontiers (1989 TV series) =

- Country of origin: United Kingdom
- No. of series: 1
- No. of episodes: 8

Original release
- Network: BBC
- Release: 1989 – 1989

Frontiers is an eight-part BBC television series, and accompanying book, that explored the geographic boundaries between countries. Eight writers and journalists in a variety of countries investigated the economic, political, geographical and historical reasons that account for why people are divided. The series was aired in 1989, just a few months before the fall of the Berlin Wall, which was featured in one episode.

== Episodes ==
- "Natural Break": Frederic Raphael explored the Pyrenees, the frontier between France and Spain, which at the time was preparing to join the (then) European Economic Community.
- "Gone Tomorrow": John Wells covered the Iron Curtain that split East and West Germans.
- "Gold and the Gun": Nadine Gordimer visited the war-torn border area between Mozambique and her native South Africa.
- "Night and Day": Richard Rodriguez showed how the rich North and poor South converged at the US/Mexican border.
- "Long Division": Ronald Eyre looked at the people living on both sides of the border in Ireland that splits the Republic from Ulster.
- "Big Brother's Bargain": Nigel Hamilton hiked up the boundary between Russia and Finland.
- "Border Run": Jon Swain visited the Thai/Cambodian border where thousands of Cambodian refugees had been stranded for over ten years.
- "Cyprus: Stranded in Time": Christopher Hitchens investigated the divided island of Cyprus.
