= Mortality (book) =

Vanity Fair essays by Christopher Hitchens

- The cover of the Atlantic Books hardcover first edition
- Author: Christopher Hitchens
- Language: English
- Subject: Biography
- Publisher: Twelve Books (US), Atlantic Books (UK)
- Publication date: 1 September 2012
- Publication place: United States
- Media type: Hardcover, Paperback, Audiobook, eBook
- Pages: 160pp Twelve Books, 128pp (Atlantic)
- ISBN: 978-1-4555-0275-2
- OCLC: 776526158

Mortality is a 2012, posthumously published book by Anglo-American writer Christopher Hitchens. It comprises seven essays which first appeared in Vanity Fair concerning his struggle with esophageal cancer, with which he was diagnosed during his 2010 book tour and which killed him in December 2011. An eighth chapter consisting of unfinished "fragmentary jottings", a foreword by Graydon Carter (Hitchens' Vanity Fair editor) and an afterword by Carol Blue (Hitchens' widow), are also included in the publication.

== Description ==
Hitchens held the post of contributing editor at Vanity Fair from November 1992 until his death. In this capacity he contributed about 10 essays per year on subjects as diverse as politics and the limits of self-improvement, writing about "anything except sports". Therefore, he felt obliged when he was asked to write about his illness for the magazine, and managed to dispatch seven essays from "Tumourville" before he was overcome by his illness on 15 December 2011, aged 62. The essays take as their subject matter his fear of losing the ability to write, the torture of chemotherapy, an analysis of Nietzsche's proclamation that "what doesn't kill you makes you stronger," the joy of conversation and the very meaning of life.

== Critical reception ==
The critical response to Mortality was largely positive with friends and admirers of Hitchens praising both his character in confronting his death and the way that this was transferred onto the page. In a glowing review of Mortality in The New York Times, Christopher Buckley described Hitchens' seven essays as "diamond-hard and brilliant" and "word-perfect." He wrote that it was "sobering and grief-inducing to read this brave and harrowing account of his "year of living dyingly" in the grip of the alien that succeeded where none of his debate opponents had in bringing him down." Buckley was a friend of Hitchens. Colm Tóibín fondly wrote in The Guardian of his experiences with Hitchens, opining that "he was the best company in the world" and offered praise for Mortality, writing that "in this book he does everything to make sure that his voice remains civilised, searching and ready to vanquish all his enemies, most notably in this case the dullness of death and its silence." Alexander Linklater of The Observer was also complimentary. Referring to John Gray's description of Hitchens as "one of the greatest living writers of English prose", Linklater responded that "the only word of that which is certainly untrue is that Hitchens is now no longer living." He also noted: "The real struggle in Mortality is not with mortality. Hitchens cleaves to the logical conclusion of his materialism. He hints, rather, at a fear of losing himself, of becoming an imbecile, someone who might, in terror and pain, say something foolish or (God forbid) religious near the end, to give his enemies satisfaction. The true struggle of his last writings is to remain himself, deep in the country of the ill, for as long as he can." Another positive review came from the magazine where Hitchens started his career, The New Statesman. George Eaton wrote that Hitchens' final work had "a timeless, aphoristic quality".
