= The Trial of Henry Kissinger =

2001 book by Christopher Hitchens

- Author: Christopher Hitchens
- Cover artist: Christian Witkin
- Language: English
- Subject: Henry Kissinger
- Publisher: Verso
- Publication date: 2001
- Publication place: United States
- Media type: Print (Hardback & Paperback)
- Pages: 145
- ISBN: 1-85984-631-9 (hardback edition)
- OCLC: 46240330
- Dewey Decimal: 973.924/092 21
- LC Class: E840.8.K58 H58 2001

The Trial of Henry Kissinger is a 2001 book by Christopher Hitchens which examines the alleged war crimes of Henry Kissinger, the National Security Advisor and later, the U.S. Secretary of State for Presidents Richard Nixon and Gerald Ford. Acting in the role of prosecutor, Hitchens presents Kissinger's involvement in a series of alleged war crimes in Vietnam, Cambodia, Laos, Bangladesh, Chile, Cyprus and East Timor.

== Summary ==
In the words of Hitchens, Kissinger deserves prosecution "for war crimes, for crimes against humanity, and for offenses against common or customary or international law, including conspiracy to commit murder, kidnap, and torture." He further calls him "a stupendous liar with a remarkable memory."

The book takes the form of a prosecutorial document, as Hitchens limits his critique to such charges as he believes might stand up in an international court of law following precedents set at Nuremberg and elsewhere. These link Kissinger to Vietnam War atrocities, the Bangladesh and East Timor genocides and assassinations in Chile, Cyprus and Washington, D.C.

The book takes a very negative view of Kissinger, calling for Americans to not ignore Kissinger's record. In the author's words, "They can either persist in averting their gaze from the egregious impunity enjoyed by a notorious war criminal and lawbreaker, or they can become seized by the exalted standards to which they continually hold everyone else."

== Publication history ==
Highlights from the book were serialized in Harper's Magazine in February and March 2001.

The book was re-issued in 2012 by Atlantic Books and Twelve Books along with two other short books by Hitchens, The Missionary Position, a critique of Mother Teresa, and No One Left to Lie To, a criticism of the political maneuvering and personal character of President Bill Clinton.

== Reception ==
Tim Walker of The Austin Chronicle lauded Hitchens as "a brilliant polemicist and a tireless reporter. Both sets of skills are on display throughout this book as he presents damning documentary evidence against Kissinger in case after case." Reed Brody of Human Rights Watch praised the book, saying it "persuasively marshals the long-known, as well as the recently declassified, evidence" of Kissinger's involvement in things such as the 1973 Chile coup and the bombing of Indochina.

Vietnam War whistleblower Fred Branfman argued that "only a nation in deep spiritual and psychological disarray could honor a man with as much blood on his hands as Henry Kissinger" and wrote that "[Hitchens's] book deserves much wider attention." Keith Phipps of The A.V. Club praised the text as a "persuasive, damning account of Kissinger's activities as an international power-broker", and said that "by the time the author—using the same careful, if one-sided, reporting—implicates Kissinger in the planned assassination of a dissident Greek journalist, it seems well within the bounds of plausibility." In the Los Angeles Times, Warren I. Cohen said Hitchens "does a lawyerly job of demonstrating Kissinger's involvement" in the 1973 overthrow of Salvador Allende and "also spells out the American role in the Greek junta's attempt in 1974 to assassinate Archbishop Makarios, president of Cyprus, and catches Kissinger and Ford acquiescing in the Indonesian invasion of East Timor in 1975."

A month after Hitchens' death, John R. MacArthur of Harper's Magazine, while criticizing Hitchens's interventionism after the September 11 attacks, referred to The Trial of Henry Kissinger as a "landmark book".

Conversely, in a review for The Daily Telegraph, author George Jonas accused Hitchens of using devices improper to nonfiction, arguing that in one passage the author "admits he is guessing, but this does not prevent him from starting the paragraph by placing 'a tremor of anxiety'—ie, a consciousness of guilt—into Dr Kissinger's mind. This device might be acceptable in a novel—except this is not a novel." Jonas further argues that Hitchens misrepresents and misleadingly shortens quotes and documents that he cites, and that he judges Kissinger unfairly for making policy decisions appropriate to his and his government's stance against communism and totalitarianism.

Kissinger biographer Niall Ferguson regarded the book as "deeply flawed [and] based on very thin research".

== Documentary film ==
The book inspired the 2002 documentary film The Trials of Henry Kissinger, which was co-written by Hitchens and fellow writer/director, Alex Gibney. Hitchens makes an appearance in the film, being interviewed about Kissinger. The documentary also features film of Kissinger but only in archive footage.

== See also ==
- Seymour Hersh
