= Blood, Class, and Nostalgia =

Book by Christopher Hitchens

Blood, Class, and Nostalgia: Anglo-American Ironies
- Title page for Blood, Class, and Nostalgia: Anglo-American Ironies (1990)
- Author: Christopher Hitchens
- Language: English
- Publication date: 1990

Blood, Class, and Nostalgia: Anglo-American Ironies is a 1990 book by Christopher Hitchens which aims to examine the so-called "Special Relationship" between the United States and Great Britain, with a focus especially on the 20th century.

A review by John T. Elson for Time magazine described the book as "rambling [and] opinionated".

It was reissued in 2004 as Blood, Class and Empire: The Enduring Anglo-American Relationship, with a new preface by the author.

Hitchens suggested that the book does not purport to be a history of the relationship; it is rather, a series of "incisions, made at selected crucial points".
