= Why Orwell Matters =

2002 book by Christopher Hitchens

- Cover of the first edition
- Author: Christopher Hitchens
- Language: English
- Subject: George Orwell
- Publisher: Basic Books
- Publication date: 2002
- Publication place: United States
- Media type: Print (Paperback)
- Pages: 211
- ISBN: 0-465-03050-5
- OCLC: 49922535

Why Orwell Matters, released in the UK as Orwell's Victory, is a book-length biographical essay by Christopher Hitchens. In it, the author relates George Orwell's thoughts on and actions in relation to: The British Empire, the Left, the Right, the United States, English conventions, feminism, and his controversial list for the British Foreign Office.

== Summary ==
=== The British Empire ===
Orwell spoke for his radio magazine 'Voice' on the BBC of India where he spoke about literature and ideas. Orwell agreed to broadcast to India under his own name on one condition; that he could express his anti-imperialist opinions without diluting them. He criticized the British government's lack of principles regarding Indian self-government and never failed to argue for India's independence. Orwell's experience working with the BBC correlated with some of the concepts in his novel Nineteen Eighty-Four. Such as his concept doublethink, in relation to the sometimes extreme daily changes in political propaganda that was being broadcast. Orwell's thoughts and writings on colonialism are a permanent part of his lifelong commitment to the subjects of power, cruelty, force, and the relationship between the dominator and the dominated. Orwell can be read as a teaching in Britain's transition from an imperial society to a multicultural and multi-ethnic one. Since this was a great development in his time, and continues to be, this is one reason Hitchens argues that Orwell matters.

=== The Left ===
Orwell contributed to the socialist press in England for many years. He considered himself to be on the left and advocated for democracy, decolonization, egalitarian ideals and heavily criticized totalitarianism. Orwell had lived under a Stalinist police regime in Spain when he fought against fascism in the Spanish Civil War. His time in Spain never left him; he continuously helped vindicate those he had known that survived the Stalinist regime. He did this by publicizing their cases, helping their families, getting them out of prison and saving them from being condemned. He witnessed how the government could distort the truth and how political enemies could suddenly disappear. Orwell returned home after he was shot in the throat. This may have saved him in a way as he was "guilty" of Trotskyism and served with the POUM militia, which was more than enough to land him in prison. Orwell's friends, such as his brigade commander Georges Kopp, were imprisoned under horrendous conditions. Kopp was subject to torture of close confinement with rats; this, and some of Orwell's other experiences in Spain, initiated some of the subject matter for Nineteen Eight-Four. His socialist peers had a great appreciation for the Soviet Union. Since Orwell had witnessed its cruelty first hand, he did not. He argued that it was not socialism, but a viscous form of state-capitalism. Many of them never forgave him about his criticisms towards the Soviet Union and being right about Spain. Despite being a leftist himself, many of Orwell's harshest critics were on the left and came about after his death. In the 1960s and 1970s the New Left despised Orwell, partly because his writings were right about the issues in society and they were not. 'Orwell put it best: the sin of most leftists is that they wanted to be anti-totalitarian without being anti-communist.'

=== The Right ===
Orwell spent his entire adult life renouncing his upbringing in the Conservative Party. It is true that he was one of the founders of anti-communism and held some beliefs that are associated with the right. Such as individualism, patriotism, his strong sense of right and wrong, and his dislike for bureaucracy and government. Liberty and equality were two of the things Orwell valued the most, as told in his writings, 'A society of free and equal human beings.' As such, they were generally not allies in Britain's laissez-faire culture at the time. Orwell was aware of this paradox and symbolizes it in Nineteen Eighty-Four; his point being that there should be no utilitarian trade-off between freedom and security. Nineteen Eighty-Four was accused of attacking the Labour Party Government. Orwell responded that he supported the Labour Party and his novel was not meant to attack it nor socialism. 'It exposes the corruptions that a centralized economy is prone to, as witnessed with communism and fascism. The novel takes place in Britain to emphasize that English-speaking races are not innately better and that totalitarianism can triumph everywhere, if not fought against.' Orwell was invited by the Duchess of Atholl in November 1945 to speak on behalf of the right-wing and anti-communist group, League for European Freedom. Orwell thought that their arguing against communist brutality was inconsistent with them claiming to support democracy, yet not supporting the end of British rule in India. Therefore, Orwell did not want to associate himself with them. In Orwell's words, 'I belong to the Left and must work inside it, as much as I hate totalitarianism and its poisonous influence.' It is true that Orwell held many conservative instincts, not prejudices. Such as his somewhat traditional moral and sexual values. Also his dislike of abortions and homosexuals, as well as sharing some anti-semitic comments in his writings. Hitchens argues that Orwell spent his life trying to reason himself out of them. Although there were times that his upbringing and pessimism succeeded his efforts, oftentimes when he was ill or depressed. Hitchens writes, 'Orwell was conservative about many things, but not about politics.'

=== America ===
Orwell never traveled to the United States as he had little interest in it. He was suspicious of the consumerist and materialistic culture. He was somewhat resentful of its imperial ambitions and overly critical about its size and vulgarity. Orwell did take American literature seriously, he recognized its success with the incomplete struggle for liberty, and discussed it on the BBC. Near the end of his life when his health was failing due to tuberculosis, he began to have a change of heart towards America. He wrote about Jack London's life and works and had a great appreciation for them. He began to realize the appeal for North America's vast land and fierce individualism. Orwell's admirers from the states urged him to visit them. There were many suitable climates for his health and the streptomycin that might have healed his lungs was only manufactured and easily distributed in America. Orwell briefly contemplated spending some time in the South writing, but he was too weak to visit.

Hitchens thinks that if Orwell had lived another ten years he would have visited the United States after being persuaded by his friends in New York. Orwell understood the importance of Thomas Paine and having a constitution. His references to American history and American ideals are scarce but quite accurate. Hitchens writes, 'the American subject was in every sense Orwell's missed opportunity.'

=== Feminism and women ===
Hitchens devotes his chapter "Orwell and the Feminists: Difficulties with Girls" to the controversies surrounding the accusations of Orwell's fear and hatred towards women. Hitchens notes that Orwell wrote for a predominantly male audience and that his female characters were "practically devoid of the least trace of intellectual or reflective capacity." Yet Orwell had good relationships with intelligent and strong women. Orwell was married twice and his first wife, Eileen O'Shaugnessy, helped sharpen the plot for Animal Farm. Orwell would read aloud his newest written chapters to her for her constructive criticism. Hitchens writes that, "Orwell liked and desired the feminine but was somewhat put on his guard by the female. And he really didn’t like, and may even have feared, either feminine men or masculine women."

=== Hitchens conclusion on Why Orwell Matters ===
According to Hitchens, Orwell is still very modern because he writes about things relevant to today like machinery, modern tyranny and warfare, psychiatry. Orwell's style is fresh, clear, and persuasive. He managed to do this while dying of tuberculosis. Hitchens: "Power is only what you allow it to be. You can resolve not to be a citizen like that, not to do the work of power for it. The reading of Orwell is not an exercise in projecting blame on others but is an exercise in accepting a responsibility for yourself and it’s for that reason that he’ll always be honored and also hated. I think he wouldn’t have it any other way."

At the end of the book, Hitchens critiques Orwell's novels and legacy. An essay sequel to the book, "Why Orwell Still Matters," appears in John Rodden's 2007 compilation The Cambridge Companion to George Orwell (ISBN 978-0-521-85842-7).

== Orwell's life as a writer ==
Orwell was brought up in a conservative upper class environment where people felt fear and loathing towards the poor. His father was involved in the Indian opium trade. Orwell volunteered to become an Indian Imperial Police officer in Burma. Orwell's first novel, Burmese Days was about a policeman, clearly based upon himself and his time there. In the novel, the policeman has a live-in mistress and servant that he has bought from her family. Hitchens speculates that Orwell resigned from his job as a police officer in the Burma because he feared he would become a racist and a sadist. Hitchens points out that this is especially important because he was facing this policeman within himself and choosing to defeat it. Orwell was ahead of his time and Hitchens believes that in some ways post-colonial studies are founded by Orwell. He figured out early on, before he went to university, that some people were in power because they enjoy punishing others.

He went 'native', as if he was in a colony, in his own country before the 30s. When the great political decade of the century had hit the world, he was ready for it. Orwell wanted to find out what living in impoverished environments were really like and to familiarize himself with the harsh facts of reality. These experiences and especially his years fighting in the Spanish Civil War turned him into a full-fledged socialist. The unpleasant facts he faced were usually the ones that put his own principles to the test. He stayed true to his experiences regardless of their harshness and regardless if they changed some of his thoughts and opinions. Orwell could easily condemn others for their dishonest and immoral stances. Despite his best efforts to reason himself out of certain prejudices, such as anti-Americanism, homophobia, misogyny and antisemitism, he struggled to completely rid himself of such.

If you were to compare Orwell's works with other journalists during his time many were likely to be tempted by those in power while Orwell was not. When Orwell was alive his works were not popular nor were they lucrative. He was not confident in his works and he would not dilute his opinions in order to gain wealth. Therefore, he had a hard time getting some of his works published. Orwell thought that his books were failures; he wrote Nineteen Eighty-Four as he was dying. If he were alive today he would be surprised at how popular they became.

== Reception and criticism ==
Publishers Weekly wrote, "Hitchens brilliantly marshals his deep knowledge of Orwell's work. Fans of Orwell will enjoy Hitchens's learned and convincing defense, while those unfamiliar with Orwell may perhaps be induced to return to the source." George Packer of The Independent gave the book a mixed review, however, remarking, "Why Orwell Matters is presented by its publisher as a case of posthumous affinity between writers across generations, but critic and subject turn out to be mismatched, and it's the critic who suffers as a result."

Despite praising many of Hitchens's analyses of Orwell, Packer added, "For a slender book, Why Orwell Matters is oddly unfocused and hard to get through. What Hitchens has to say is what a sympathetic reader of Orwell would want said. But he never sustains a line of thought long enough or searchingly enough to reach a truly provocative insight. There's no sense of a deepening engagement with the subject; one is never allowed to forget the gesticulating presence of the critic. The valuable reflections on Orwell keep getting interrupted by a series of asides, ripostes and thrusts into tangled little backwaters."

Alex Lee from the Yale Review of Books concludes that in the end Hitchens has "proved his basic point: The modern world needs more of the clear thinking, good writing and simple ideals that Orwell stood for." Lee recommends that the reader go back and read some of Orwell's own books and essays: "Only by directly dealing with Orwell’s work can one comprehend his profound wisdom and his continued relevance in troubled and uncertain times."

John Rossi, professor of history at La Salle University in Philadelphia, wrote that: "Christopher Hitchens has written one of the best books on Orwell to appear in recent years. I found a few mistakes but nothing serious. What makes it such a powerful book is that it can be read either as an introduction to Orwell and his works or as a summary insight into them. Quite an accomplishment and one that will convince many to take Hitchens seriously in the future."
