= God Is Not Great =

2007 book by Christopher Hitchens

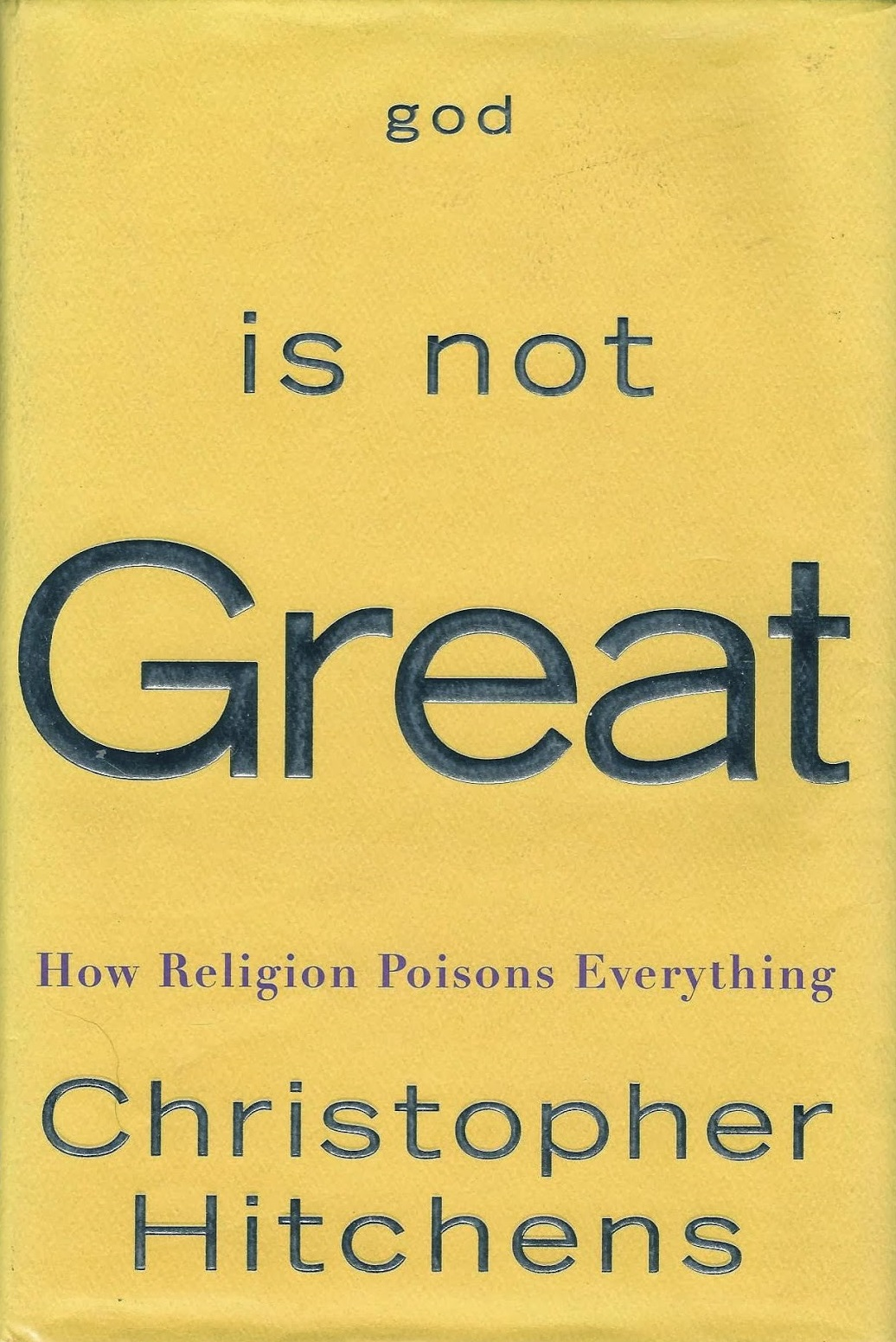
- Cover of the U.S. hard-cover edition
- Author: Christopher Hitchens
- Language: English
- Subject: Criticism of religion
- Publisher: Twelve Books imprint of the Hachette Book Group USA
- Publication date: May 1, 2007
- Publication place: United States
- Media type: Print (hardcover and paperback), and audiobook
- Pages: 307
- ISBN: 978-0-446-57980-3
- OCLC: 70630426
- Dewey Decimal: 200 22
- LC Class: BL2775.3 .H58 2007

God Is Not Great (sometimes stylized as god is not Great) is a 2007 book by journalist Christopher Hitchens in which he makes a case against organized religion. It was originally published in the United Kingdom by Atlantic Books as God Is Not Great: The Case Against Religion and in the United States by Twelve as God Is Not Great: How Religion Poisons Everything, but in 2017 Atlantic Books republished it with no subtitle.

Hitchens states that organized religion is "violent, irrational, intolerant, allied to racism, tribalism, and bigotry, invested in ignorance and hostile to free inquiry, contemptuous of women and coercive toward children" and is sectarian, and that accordingly it "ought to have a great deal on its conscience". He supports his position with a mixture of personal stories, documented historical anecdotes and critical analysis of religious texts. His commentary focuses mainly on the Abrahamic religions, although it also touches on other religions, such as Eastern religions. The book sold well and received mixed reviews, with some critics finding historical inaccuracies in the text and some finding the book highly important.

The title of the book negates the Muslim affirmation Allahu akbar, which translates as "God is great".

== Summary ==
Hitchens begins by describing his early skepticism toward religion and argues that faith persists due to human fear of mortality (ch. 1). He claims religion imposes itself on others and frequently incites violence, citing his experiences in cities like Belfast and Beirut and the reaction to Salman Rushdie's novel The Satanic Verses (ch. 2). He discusses religious prohibitions against pork. He critiques religious interference in public health, referring to the Catholic Church's stance on condoms in Africa, resistance to vaccines in some Islamic groups, religious circumcision and religious female genital mutilation (ch. 4).

He argues that religious metaphysics are false and that advances in science make leaps of faith increasingly redundant (ch. 5). He challenges the argument from design, claiming religion promotes both human inferiority and self-importance while failing to explain natural flaws (ch. 6). He describes the Old Testament as violent and inconsistent, with laws that contradict its own commandments (ch. 7), and presents the New Testament as derivative and historically unreliable, marked by contradictions and retrofitted narratives (ch. 8). He argues that Islam borrows myths from both Judaism and Christianity and is shaped by political motives and linguistic control. He then proposes that Islam's resistance to reform, suppression of dissent, and claims of divine authority are a sign of insecurity rather than truth (ch. 9).

Hitchens contends that all reported miracles are unverified and that belief in them relies on fabricated or unreliable testimony (ch. 10). He argues that many religions originated in fraud or delusion, citing Mormonism and cargo cults as examples (ch. 11), and asserts that religions do die out over time despite claims of permanence (ch. 12). He disputes the notion that religion improves morality, pointing to the abolitionist movement as an example of secular virtue (ch. 13), and critiques Eastern religions for encouraging mental submission and failing to offer consistent spiritual insight (ch. 14).

He argues that religion promotes doctrines such as eternal punishment, blood sacrifice, and sexual repression, which he views as "positively immoral" (ch. 15), and says it harms children through fear and physical abuse (ch. 16). Responding to claims that atheists like Stalin committed worse crimes than the religious, he contends that totalitarianism is political rather than a result of atheism (ch. 17). He concludes that humanity is likely to outgrow religion, comparing it to various other abandoned practices (ch. 18), and suggests that meaning and community can be found through secular, non-coercive means (ch. 19).

== Critical reception ==
=== Positive critique ===
Michael Kinsley, in The New York Times Book Review, lauded Hitchens's "logical flourishes and conundrums, many of them entertaining to the nonbeliever". He concluded that "Hitchens has outfoxed the Hitchens watchers by writing a serious and deeply felt book, totally consistent with his beliefs of a lifetime".

Bruce DeSilva considered the book to be the best piece of atheist writing since Bertrand Russell's Why I Am Not a Christian (1927), with Hitchens using "elegant yet biting prose". He concludes that "Hitchens has nothing new to say, although it must be acknowledged that he says it exceptionally well".

The book was praised in Kirkus Reviews as a "pleasingly intemperate assault on organized religion" that "like-minded readers will enjoy".

In The Sydney Morning Herald, Matt Buchanan dubbed it "a thundering 300-page cannonade; a thrillingly fearless, impressively wide-ranging, thoroughly bilious and angry book against the idea of God"; Buchanan found the work to be "easily the most impressive of the present crop of atheistic and anti-theistic books: clever, broad, witty and brilliantly argued".

Jason Cowley in the Financial Times called the book "elegant but derivative".

=== Negative critique ===
Scholar David Bentley Hart, reviewing the book in the Christian journal First Things, interpreted the book as a "rollicking burlesque, without so much as a pretense of logical order or scholarly rigor". Hart says "On matters of simple historical and textual fact, moreover, Hitchens' book is so extraordinarily crowded with errors that one soon gives up counting them." Hart claims that Hitchens conflates the histories of the 1st and 4th crusades, restates the discredited assertion that the early church destroyed ancient pagan texts, and asserts that Myles Coverdale and John Wycliffe were burned alive when both men died of old age.

Stephen Prothero of The Washington Post considered Hitchens correct on many points but found the book "maddeningly dogmatic" and criticized Hitchens's condemnation of religion altogether, writing that "If this is religion, then by all means we should have less of it. But the only people who believe that religion is about believing blindly in a God who blesses and curses on demand and sees science and reason as spawns of Satan are unlettered fundamentalists and their atheistic doppelgängers."

Responding to Hitchens's claim that "all attempts to reconcile faith with science and reason are consigned to failure and ridicule", Peter Berkowitz of the Hoover Institution quotes paleontologist Stephen Jay Gould. Referencing a number of scientists with religious faith, Gould wrote, "Either half my colleagues are enormously stupid, or else the science of Darwinism is fully compatible with conventional religious beliefs—and equally compatible with atheism."

William J. Hamblin of the FARMS Review criticized Hitchens for implying unanimity among biblical scholars on controversial points and overlooking alternative scholarly positions, and felt that Hitchens's understanding of biblical studies was "flawed at best." "[F]or Hitchens, it is sufficient to dismiss the most extreme, literalistic, and inerrantist interpretations of the Bible to demonstrate not only that the Bible itself is thoroughly flawed, false, and poisonous but that God does not exist." Hamblin felt that he misrepresented the Bible "at the level of a confused undergraduate", failing to contextualise it. Hamblin concluded that the book "should certainly not be seen as reasonable grounds for rejecting belief in God".

Daniel C. Peterson, a professor of Islamic Studies and Arabic, criticized the accuracy of Hitchens's claims in a lengthy essay, describing it as "crammed to the bursting point with errors, and the striking thing about this is that the errors are always, always, in Hitchens's favor. ... In many cases, Hitchens is 180 degrees wrong. He is so far wrong that, if he moved at all, he would be coming back toward right."

Academic Curtis White, writing in Salon, criticized the book as "intellectually shameful". White, an atheist critic of religion, asserted that "one enormous problem with Hitchens's book is that it reduces religion to a series of criminal anecdotes. In the process, however, virtually all of the real history of religious thought, as well as historical and textual scholarship, is simply ignored as if it never existed."

== Sales history ==
The book was published on May 1, 2007, and within a week had reached No. 2 on the Amazon bestsellers list, and reached No. 1 on The New York Times Best Seller list in its third week.

== Notes ==
=== Sources ===
- Hitchens, Christopher (2007), God Is Not Great: How Religion Poisons Everything, New York: Twelve Books, ISBN 9780446579803.
- Hitchens, Christopher (2011), Hitch-22: A Memoir, Sydney: Allen & Unwin, ISBN 9781742376042.
