= Thomas Jefferson: Author of America =

2005 biography of Thomas Jefferson by Christopher Hitchens

- Cover of the first edition
- Author: Christopher Hitchens
- Language: English
- Subject: Thomas Jefferson
- Publisher: HarperCollins
- Publication date: 2005
- Publication place: United States
- Media type: Print (hardcover and paperback)
- Pages: 188
- ISBN: 0-06-059896-4
- OCLC: 60525341
- Dewey Decimal: 973.4/6092 B 22
- LC Class: E332 .H66 2005b

Thomas Jefferson: Author of America is a short 2005 biography of Founding Father Thomas Jefferson, the third President of the United States (1801–1809) and the principal author of the Declaration of Independence (1776), by author, journalist and literary critic Christopher Hitchens.

It was released as a part of HarperCollins' Eminent Lives series of "brief biographies by distinguished authors on canonical figures."

The book is dedicated to founder and retired CEO of C-SPAN, Brian Lamb: "For Brian Lamb, a great Virginian and a great American, a fine democrat as well as a good republican, who has striven for an educated electorate"

== Reception ==
The book has been praised by critics. Ted Widmer of The New York Times wrote, "Hitchens brings a refreshing perspective to the task, both in that he has not written at length about the founding moment and in that he sees Jefferson from the perspective of a Briton, albeit an Americanized one." Publishers Weekly similarly described it as a "brief yet dense biography" and called it "a fascinating character study and an excellent review of early American history." Kirkus Reviews called it "a lucid, gently critical view of the great president and empire-builder and most literate of politicians."
