= Thomas Paine's "Rights of Man": A Biography =

Book by Christopher Hitchens

- Cover of the first edition
- Author: Christopher Hitchens
- Language: English
- Publisher: Atlantic Monthly Press
- Publication date: 2007
- Publication place: United States
- Media type: Print (hardback)
- Pages: 160
- ISBN: 978-0-87113-955-9
- OCLC: 80181370
- Dewey Decimal: 323.5 22
- LC Class: JC177.H5 H58 2006

Thomas Paine's "Rights of Man": A Biography is Christopher Hitchens's contribution to the Books That Changed the World series. Hitchens, a great admirer of Thomas Paine, covers the history of Paine's 1791 book, The Rights of Man, and analyzes its significance.

== Reception ==
The book was praised by Richard Brookhiser of The New York Times, who observed, "Hitchens's discussion of Paine's book is really a discussion of two books, Paine's and Burke's. 'This classic exchange between two masters of polemic,' he says, 'is rightly considered to be the ancestor of all modern arguments between Tories and radicals.' Hitchens is in Paine's corner, but like a good trainer, he knows the other fighter's strengths." Nicholas Lezard of The Guardian described it as "an elegant and useful primer on a subject which [...] ought still to engage us all." Publishers Weekly similarly called the book a "lucid assessment" of Paine and lauded Hitchens's "characteristically energetic prose".

Conversely, scholar John Barrell wrote that the book contained historical inaccuracies and criticized its similarities to John Keane's book Tom Paine: A Political Life. Barrell wrote, "compared with any other book on Paine I can think of, this one is casual, even perfunctory. Long before I reached the end of what is a very long short book, I was at a loss to know why it had been written." He added, "There is a bit of marvelling and revelling here and there, but it is as routine as everything else in this book, which reads like the work of a tired man."
