= A Long Short War =

- Cover of the first edition
- Author: Christopher Hitchens
- Language: English
- Publisher: Plume/Penguin Group
- Publication date: June 3, 2003
- Publication place: United States
- Media type: Print (Paperback)
- Pages: 104
- ISBN: 0-452-28498-8
- OCLC: 52214965
- Dewey Decimal: 956.7044/3 21
- LC Class: DS79.76 .H58 2003

A Long Short War: The Postponed Liberation of Iraq is a collection of twenty-two articles originally written by Christopher Hitchens for the online magazine Slate. The articles support the impending American-led invasion of Iraq and were written between November 7, 2002 and April 18, 2003.

== Background ==
In the preface, Hitchens is typically unapologetic about his pro-invasion stance (a stance which solidified the author's break with the anti-war leadership of the American left), stating:

I began from the viewpoint of one who took the side of the Iraqi and Kurdish opposition to Saddam Hussein, who hoped for their victory, and who had come to believe that the chiefest and gravest mistake of Western and especially American statecraft had been to reconfirm Saddam Hussein in power in 1991 (Hitchens, v).

Among the many individuals credited in the introduction are Barham Salih (a member of the Iraqi National Assembly and former prime minister of the Patriotic Union of Kurdistan), Kanan Makiya (author of a number of books, including 1989's best-selling Republic of Fear) and Ahmad Chalabi (former deputy Prime Minister of Iraq).

== Contents ==
The book is not a single, cohesive narrative but rather a compilation of Hitchens' writings on Iraq, arranged chronologically. This format allows readers to trace the evolution of Hitchens' thoughts and arguments as the situation in Iraq unfolded.

The essays are constructed in highly polemical prose, and heap especial scorn on what Hitchens sees as the sickly masochism of the dovish Left, systematically addressing and dismissing the most popular of the antiwar arguments while tendering ordered expostulations of his own position. Turkey and France were heavily chastised, while a qualified defence of George W. Bush is mounted, in one essay against the charge that the US president merits the appellative "cowboy" and in another that he rushed his nation into war.

"I used to call myself a single-issue voter on the essential question of defending civilization against its terrorist enemies and their totalitarian protectors," wrote Hitchens in 2008, "and on that 'issue' I hope I can continue to expose and oppose any ambiguity."

== Responses ==
Hitchens is seen by many as a "liberal hawk", comprising left-leaning commentators who supported the 2003 Invasion of Iraq. This informal grouping includes the British writers Nick Cohen, Johann Hari, David Aaronovitch, Norman Geras, Julie Burchill, and the Canadian Michael Ignatieff (see Euston Manifesto). Neoconservatives of the last decade are hesitant to embrace Hitchens as one of their own, in part because of his harsh criticisms of Ronald Reagan and his refusal to associate himself as such.

Despite his many articles supporting the US invasion of Iraq, Hitchens made a brief return to The Nation just before the 2004 US presidential election and wrote that he was "slightly" for George W. Bush; shortly afterwards, Slate polled its staff on their positions on the candidates and mistakenly printed Hitchens' vote as pro-Kerry. Hitchens shifted his opinion to "neutral", saying: "It's absurd for liberals to talk as if Kristallnacht is impending with Bush, and it's unwise and indecent for Republicans to equate Kerry with capitulation. There's no one to whom he can surrender, is there? I think that the nature of the jihadist enemy will decide things in the end".

The book received mixed responses. Supportive reviews praised Hitchens's emphasis on Saddam Hussein's human-rights abuses and his argument that the invasion could be justified on humanitarian grounds. Other critics questioned his support for the war and argued that his assessment of the likely consequences of regime change was overly optimistic. Hitchens himself later acknowledged problems with the post-invasion administration of Iraq, particularly the failure to restore basic services and establish an Iraqi-led interim authority.
