= Christopher Hitchens =

British and American author and journalist (1949–2011)

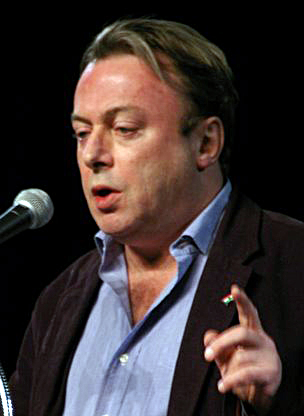
- Hitchens in 2007
- Born: Christopher Eric Hitchens; 13 April 1949; Portsmouth, England
- Died: 15 December 2011 (aged 62); Houston, Texas, US
- Citizenship: United Kingdom; United States (from 2007)
- Political party: Labour (1965–1967); International Socialists (1967–1971)
- Spouses: Eleni Meleagrou (m. 1981; div. 1989); Carol Blue (m. 1991)
- Children: 3
- Relatives: Peter Hitchens (brother)

Education
- Education: Balliol College, Oxford (BA)

Philosophical work
- Notable ideas: Hitchens's razor

Christopher Eric Hitchens (13 April 1949 – 15 December 2011) was a British and American author and journalist. Known as one of the "Four Horsemen" of New Atheism (along with Richard Dawkins, Sam Harris, and Daniel Dennett), he gained prominence as a columnist and speaker. Hitchens's epistemological razor, which states that "what can be asserted without evidence can also be dismissed without evidence", is used in philosophy and law.

Hitchens was born and educated in Britain, graduating in 1970 from the University of Oxford with a degree in philosophy, politics, and economics. In the early 1980s, he emigrated to the United States and wrote for The Nation and Vanity Fair. Hitchens's political views evolved greatly throughout his life. (Note: After the September 11 attacks of 2001, Hitchens was widely perceived as having migrated to the right on the political spectrum, actively campaigning for the invasion of Iraq and deposal of Saddam Hussein and endorsing George W. Bush in the 2004 US presidential election. Hitchens dropped his column for The Nation in 2002. He maintained that the shifts in his political allegiances were motivated by the right's stronger and more-interventionist stance against what he deemed 'fascism with an Islamic face'.) Originally describing himself as a democratic socialist, he was a member of various socialist organisations in his early life, including the Trotskyist International Socialists.

Hitchens was critical of aspects of American foreign policy, including its involvement in Vietnam, Chile, and East Timor. However, he supported the United States in the Kosovo War, Bosnian War, and other interventions. Hitchens emphasised the centrality of the American Revolution and Constitution to his political philosophy. He held complex views on abortion: being ethically opposed to it in most instances, and believing that a foetus was entitled to personhood, while holding ambiguous, changing views on its legality. He supported gun rights and supported same-sex marriage, while opposing the war on drugs. (Note: I asked him if he'd be up for writing a column on gun control. He told me that he'd love to. But he wanted to let me know up front that he was opposed to controls.) Beginning in the 1990s, and particularly after 9/11, his politics were widely viewed as drifting to the right, but Hitchens objected to being called 'conservative' and maintained he was a 'leftist'. During the 2000s, he argued for the invasions of Iraq and Afghanistan, endorsed George W. Bush for president in 2004 and Barack Obama in 2008, and viewed Islamism as the principal threat to the Western world.

Hitchens described himself as an antitheist and saw all religions as false, harmful, and authoritarian. (Note: I am [not a] part of the generalised agnosticism of our culture. I am not even an atheist so much as I am an anti-theist ... all religions are versions of the same untruth ... the influence of churches, and the effect of religious belief, is positively harmful ... cradle-to-grave divine supervision; a permanent surveillance and monitoring ... I am [not] privy to the secrets of the universe or its creator ... even [the best of the theisms] are complicit in this quiet and irrational authoritarianism.) He endorsed free expression, scientific scepticism, and separation of church and state, arguing science and philosophy are superior to religion as an ethical code of conduct for human civilisation. Hitchens authored 18 books on faith, religion, culture, politics, and literature. He notably wrote critical biographies of Catholic nun Mother Teresa in The Missionary Position (1995), Bill Clinton in No One Left to Lie To (1999), and American diplomat Henry Kissinger in The Trial of Henry Kissinger (2001). Hitchens died from complications related to esophageal cancer in December 2011, at the age of 62.

== Early life and education ==
Hitchens was born in Portsmouth, Hampshire, the elder of two boys; his brother, Peter, became a socially conservative journalist. Their parents, Commander Eric Ernest Hitchens (1909–1987) and Yvonne Jean Hitchens (née Hickman; 1921–1973), met in Scotland when serving in the Royal Navy during World War II. His mother had been a Wren, a member of the Women's Royal Naval Service. She was of Jewish origin, something that Hitchens discovered when he was 38; he thus came to identify as a Jew.

Hitchens often referred to his father simply as 'the Commander'. Eric Hitchens was deployed on HMS Jamaica, which took part in the sinking of the Scharnhorst in the Battle of the North Cape on 26 December 1943. He paid tribute to his father's contribution to the war: "Sending a Nazi convoy-raider to the bottom is a better day's work than any I have ever done." Eric's naval career required the family to move from base to base throughout Britain and its colonies; including to Malta, where Peter Hitchens was born in Sliema in 1951. Eric later worked as a bookkeeper for boatbuilders, speed boat manufacturers, and a prep school.

Hitchens attended two private schools—Mount House School, Tavistock, Devon, from the age of eight, and the Leys School in Cambridge. Hitchens went up to Balliol College, Oxford, in 1967 where he read philosophy, politics and economics and was tutored by Steven Lukes and Anthony Kenny. He graduated in 1970 with a third-class degree. In his adolescence, he was "bowled over" by Richard Llewellyn's How Green Was My Valley, Arthur Koestler's Darkness at Noon, Fyodor Dostoyevsky's Crime and Punishment, R. H. Tawney's critique on Religion and the Rise of Capitalism, and the works of George Orwell. In 1968, he took part in the TV quiz-show University Challenge. (Note: What she [Yvonne] wanted was to see me represent Balliol on the University Challenge team, where I did actually make my first-ever television appearance.)

In the 1960s, Hitchens joined the political left; drawn by disagreement over the Vietnam War, nuclear weapons, racism, and oligarchy, including that of "the unaccountable corporation". He expressed affinity with the politically charged counter-cultural and protest movements of the 1960s and 1970s. He avoided the recreational drug-use of the time, saying "in my cohort we were slightly anti-hedonistic ... it made it very much easier for police provocation to occur, because the planting of drugs was something that happened to almost everyone one knew." Hitchens was inspired to become a journalist after reading a piece by James Cameron.

Hitchens was bisexual during his younger days, and joked that, as he aged, his appearance "declined to the point where only women would go to bed with [him]". He said he had sexual relations with two male students at Oxford who would later become government ministers during the premiership of Margaret Thatcher, although he would not reveal their names publicly.

Hitchens joined the Labour Party in 1965, but along with the majority of the Labour students' organisation was expelled in 1967, because of what Hitchens called "Prime Minister Harold Wilson's contemptible support for the war in Vietnam". Under the influence of Peter Sedgwick, who translated the writings of the Russian revolutionary and Soviet dissident Victor Serge, Hitchens forged an ideological interest in Trotskyism and anti-Stalinist socialism. Shortly after, he joined "a small but growing post-Trotskyist Luxemburgist sect", the International Socialists. Hitchens recruited James Fenton to the International Socialists.

== Career ==
=== Journalistic career in the UK (1971–1981) ===
Early in his career Hitchens began working as a correspondent for the magazine International Socialism, published by the International Socialists, the forerunners of today's British Socialist Workers Party. This group was broadly Trotskyist, but differed from more orthodox Trotskyist groups in its refusal to defend communist states as "workers' states". Their slogan was "Neither Washington nor Moscow but International Socialism".

In 1971 after spending a year travelling the United States on a scholarship, Hitchens went to work at the Times Higher Education Supplement where he served as a social science correspondent. Hitchens was fired after six months in the job. Next he was a researcher for ITV's Weekend World.

In 1973 Hitchens went to work for the New Statesman, where his colleagues included the authors Martin Amis, whom he had briefly met at Oxford, as well as Julian Barnes and James Fenton, with whom he had shared a house in Oxford. Amis described him at the time as, "handsome, festive [and] gauntly left-wing". Around that time, the Friday lunches began, which were attended by writers including Clive James, Ian McEwan, Kingsley Amis, Terence Kilmartin, Robert Conquest, Al Alvarez, Peter Porter, Russell Davies, and Mark Boxer. At the New Statesman Hitchens acquired a reputation as a left-winger while working as a war correspondent from areas of conflict such as Northern Ireland, Libya, and Iraq.

In November 1973, while in Greece, Hitchens reported on the constitutional crisis of the military junta. It became his first leading article for the New Statesman. In December 1977 Hitchens interviewed Argentine dictator Jorge Rafael Videla, a conversation he later described as "horrifying". In 1977, unhappy at the New Statesman, Hitchens moved to the Daily Express, where he became a foreign correspondent. He returned to the New Statesman in 1978 where he became assistant editor and then foreign editor.

=== American writings (1981–2011) ===
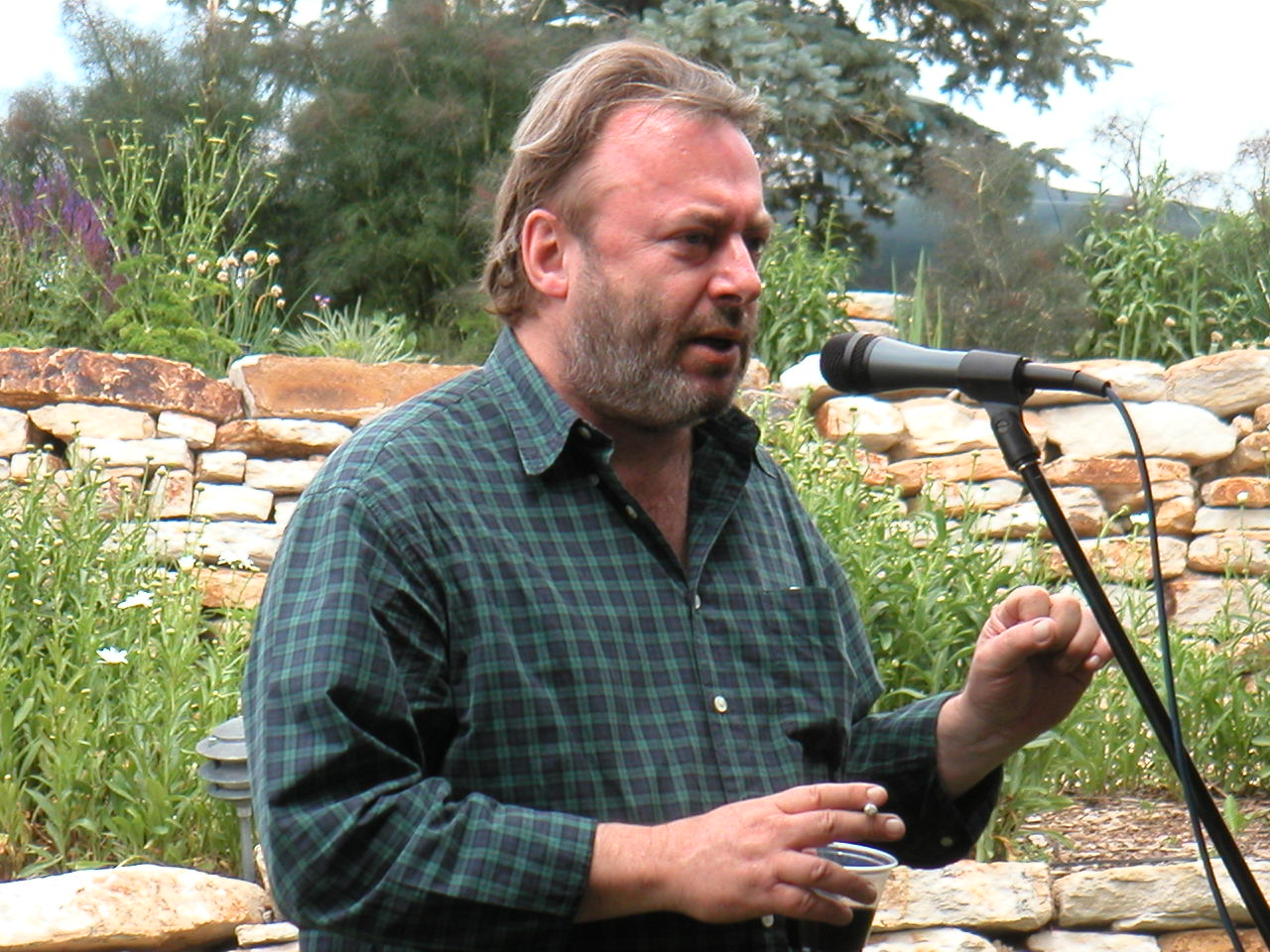
Hitchens in 2005

Hitchens went to the United States in 1981 as part of an editor exchange programme between the New Statesman and The Nation. After joining The Nation, he penned vociferous critiques of Ronald Reagan, George H. W. Bush and American foreign policy in South and Central America.

Hitchens became a contributing editor of Vanity Fair in 1992, writing ten columns a year. He left The Nation in 2002 after profoundly disagreeing with other contributors over the Iraq War.

There is speculation that Hitchens was the inspiration for Tom Wolfe's character Peter Fallow in the 1987 novel The Bonfire of the Vanities, but others—including Hitchens—believe it to be Spy Magazine's "Ironman Nightlife Decathlete", Anthony Haden-Guest. In 1987, Hitchens's father died of cancer of the oesophagus, the same disease that would later claim his own life. In April 2007, Hitchens became a US citizen; he later stated that he saw himself as Anglo-American. (Note: Julian Morrow "How do you identify yourself now?" Christopher Hitchens "Anglo-American. I mean I didn't move to the United States until I was about 30, so it would be silly to say I'd left everything behind." Audience member "If you had to give up one, which passport would it be? The British or the American?" Christopher Hitchens "That's a waste of a question." Audience member [embarrassed groan] Christopher Hitchens [adamantly] "Anglo-American")

He became a media fellow at the Hoover Institution in September 2008. At Slate, he usually wrote under the news-and-politics column Fighting Words.

Before Hitchens's political shift, the American author and polemicist Gore Vidal spoke of Hitchens as his "dauphin" or "heir". In 2010 Hitchens attacked Vidal in a Vanity Fair piece headlined "Vidal Loco", calling him a "crackpot" for his adoption of 9/11 conspiracy theories. On the back of Hitchens's memoir Hitch-22, among the praise from notable figures, Vidal's endorsement of Hitchens as his successor is crossed out in red and annotated "NO, C.H." Hitchens's strong advocacy of the war in Iraq gained him a wider readership, and in September 2005 he was named as fifth on the list of the "Top 100 Public Intellectuals" by Foreign Policy and Prospect magazines. An online poll ranked the 100 intellectuals, but the magazines noted that the rankings of Hitchens (5), Noam Chomsky (1), and Abdolkarim Soroush (15) were partly due to their respective supporters' publicising of the vote. Hitchens later responded to his ranking with a few articles about his status as such.

Hitchens did not leave his position writing for The Nation until after the September 11 attacks, stating that he felt the magazine had arrived at a position "that John Ashcroft is a greater menace than Osama bin Laden". The 11 September attacks "exhilarated" him, bringing into focus "a battle between everything I love and everything I hate" and strengthening his embrace of an interventionist foreign policy that challenged "fascism with an Islamic face".

Hitchens recalls in his memoir having been "invited by Bernard-Henri Lévy to write an essay on political reconsiderations for his magazine La Règle du jeu. I gave it the partly ironic title: 'Can One Be a Neoconservative?' Impatient with this, some copy editor put it on the cover as 'How I Became a Neoconservative.' Perhaps this was an instance of the Cartesian principle as opposed to the English empiricist one: It was decided that I evidently was what I apparently only thought." Indeed, in a 2010 BBC interview, he stated that he "still [thought] like a Marxist" and considered himself "a leftist".

In 2007, Hitchens published one of his most controversial articles titled "Why Women Aren't Funny" in Vanity Fair. While providing no empirical evidence, he argued that there is less societal pressure for women to practice humour and that "women who do it play by men's rules". Over the following year, Vanity Fair published several letters that it received, objecting to the tone or premise of the article, as well as a rebuttal by Alessandra Stanley. Amid further criticism, Hitchens reiterated his position in a video and written response.

In 2007 Hitchens's work for Vanity Fair won the National Magazine Award in the category "Columns and Commentary". He was a finalist in the same category in 2008 for some of his columns in Slate but lost out to Matt Taibbi of Rolling Stone. Hitch-22 was short-listed for the 2010 National Book Critics Circle Award for Autobiography. He won the National Magazine Award for Columns about Cancer in 2011. Hitchens also served on the advisory board of Secular Coalition for America and offered advice to the Coalition on the acceptance and inclusion of nontheism in American life. In December 2011, prior to his death, Asteroid 57901 Hitchens was named after him.

=== Literature reviews ===
Hitchens wrote a monthly essay in The Atlantic magazine and occasionally contributed to other literary journals. One of his books, Unacknowledged Legislation: Writers in the Public Sphere, collected these works. In Why Orwell Matters, he defends Orwell's writings against modern critics as relevant today and progressive for his time. In the 2008 book Christopher Hitchens and His Critics: Terror, Iraq, and the Left, many literary critiques are included of essays and other books of writers, such as David Horowitz and Edward Said.

During a three-hour In Depth interview on Book TV, he named authors who influenced his views, including Aldous Huxley, George Orwell, Evelyn Waugh, Kingsley Amis, P. G. Wodehouse and Conor Cruise O'Brien. (Note: "I don't know where to begin as to say which was the most influential author. I can remember the dystopian writers of Aldous Huxley ... Arthur Koestler ... [on-screen list as follows] George Eliot, George Orwell, Martin Amis, Ian McEwan, Salman Rushdie, Colm Tóibín, Karl Marx, Richard Dawkins, P. G. Woodhouse, Evelyn Waugh, Paul Scott, James Fenton, James Joyce, [and Hitchens mentions] Conor Cruise O'Brien's .'Writers and Politics'. I read in 1967 ... I remember thinking very, very distinctly that, I'd like to be able to write like that and on topics of that sort.") (Note: "I think there are certain authors of whom one should have all of their books ... George Orwell, most of Marcel Proust, most of James Joyce, not all of P. G. Woodhouse ... Karl Marx, Leon Trotsky, Vladimir Nabokov ... Salman Rushdie, Martin and Kingsley Amis, Ian McEwan.")

He once remarked on the adage "everyone has a book inside of them" that this is "exactly where I think it should, in most cases, remain".

=== Professorships ===
Hitchens was a visiting professor in the following institutions:

- University of California, Berkeley
- The University of Pittsburgh
- The New School of Social Research

== Political views ==
My own opinion is enough for me, and I claim the right to have it defended against any consensus, any majority, anywhere, anyplace, anytime. And anyone who disagrees with this can pick a number, get in line, and kiss my ass.

— Christopher Hitchens

Hitchens was long described by himself and others as a socialist and a Marxist, although he held many views on foreign policy which were considered heterodox compared to his contemporaries on the left. Hitchens described his break from modern U.S. liberals after what he called the "tepid reaction" of the Western left to the controversy over The Satanic Verses, followed by what he saw as the American Left’s embrace of Bill Clinton and the anti-war movement's opposition to NATO intervention in Bosnia and Herzegovina in the 1990s. He later became a so-called “liberal hawk” and supported the war on terror, but he had some reservations, such as his characterisation of waterboarding as torture after voluntarily undergoing the procedure. In January 2006, he joined four other individuals and four organisations, including the ACLU and Greenpeace, as plaintiffs in a lawsuit, ACLU v. NSA, challenging Bush's NSA warrantless surveillance; the lawsuit was filed by the ACLU. In 2009 Hitchens was listed by Forbes magazine as one of the 25 "most influential liberals" in the US media. The article also noted that he would "likely be aghast to find himself on this list", as it reduces his self-styled radicalism to mere liberalism. Hitchens's political perspectives also appear in his wide-ranging writings, which include many dialogues. Hitchens is often attributed the quote regarding classical liberals and Libertarians: "I have always found it quaint, and rather touching, that there is a movement in the US that thinks Americans are not yet selfish enough."

=== Cultural issues ===
Hitchens held complex views on abortion; being ethically opposed to it in most instances, and believing that a foetus was entitled to personhood, while holding ambiguous and changing views on its legality. In a 1988 interview with Crisis Magazine, Hitchens wrote: "It might interest your readers to know that Margaret Thatcher voted to keep capital punishment, to keep homosexuality criminal, to make divorce harder to get, and for the abortion bill. I gather that she's since changed her position on the latter. My own vote would have been, as so often, exactly the reverse of hers." However, Hitchens argued that the issue was cynically used by self-described pro-life politicians, and doubted that they sincerely desired to legally prohibit abortion. In the same 1988 interview with Crisis Magazine he stated: "Once you allow that the occupant of the womb is even potentially a life, it cuts athwart any glib invocation of "the woman's right to choose" and that:

I would like to see something much broader, much more visionary. We need a new compact between society and the woman. It's a progressive compact because it is aimed at the future generation. It would restrict abortion in most circumstances. Now I know most women don't like having to justify their circumstances to someone. 'How dare you presume to subject me to this?' some will say.

But sorry, lady, this is an extremely grave social issue. It's everybody's business.

Hitchens supported gun rights and supported same-sex marriage. Hitchens was known for his dislike of Nanny state policies put in place by New York city mayor Michael Bloomberg. On 9 July 2009, Hitchens wrote an article criticizing and mocking New York city regulations including smoking laws, bicycle laws, milk crate laws and other regulations. In the same article Hitchens claimed he had broken the laws he had criticized in the article. He opposed sodomy laws and supported same-sex marriage. He argued that the legalization of same-sex marriage was the "socialization of homosexuality" and "demonstrates the spread of conservatism" among the gay community. Hitchens was a genital integrity activist, strongly criticizing the tradition of both male circumcision and female genital mutilation. In accordance with his antitheism, Hitchens described the tolerance of metzitzah b'peh (a Jewish tradition of sucking blood from the penis after the removal of the male foreskin) as "another disgusting religious practice".

In a 2011 essay for The Atlantic titled "The Real Mahatma Gandhi," written as a review of Joseph Lelyveld's biography Great Soul, Hitchens critically re-examined Gandhi's legacy. He questioned the universality of Gandhi's doctrine of nonviolence, citing Gandhi's letters to Adolf Hitler during World War II in which Gandhi urged the application of satyagraha against the Nazi regime. Hitchens argued that Gandhi's religious and ascetic worldview was fundamentally incompatible with secular and democratic politics.

Hitchens was a lifelong opponent of capital punishment. In a 2001 interview with Reason, Hitchens recalled that this was the very first issue on which he ever decided to take a stand in his youth. The reason for his opposition to capital punishment was that it gave too much power to the government. He later publicly opposed use of the death penalty for Saddam Hussein, an issue he discussed at length in his November 2006 essay "Don't Hang Saddam" for Slate.

=== International relations ===
Hitchens's numerous editorials in support of the Iraq War caused some to label him a neoconservative; Hitchens insisted he was not "a conservative of any kind". He maintained he was a "leftist" and his friend Ian McEwan described him as representing the anti-totalitarian left, but Hitchens professed to first finding himself "on the same side as the neocons" in supporting intervention in the Bosnian War, as he felt the left's opposition to intervention was mutating into support of Milošević's reactionism.

Hitchens disagreed with the premise of a Jewish homeland and had said of himself, "I am an Anti-Zionist. I'm one of those people of Jewish descent who believes that Zionism would be a mistake even if there were no Palestinians." and "If Jews born in Brooklyn have a right to a state in Palestine, then Palestinians born in Jerusalem have a right to a state in Palestine. Anyone who doesn't agree with that principle I think is suspect." Hitchens had previously collaborated on this issue with Edward Said, publishing the 1988 book Blaming the Victims: Spurious Scholarship and the Palestinian Question.

Hitchens was an avid critic of President Slobodan Milošević of Serbia and other Serbian politicians of the 1990s. He called Milošević a "fascist" and a "Nazi" after the Bosnian genocide and ethnic cleansing of Albanians in Kosovo and expressed a positive reaction to his death. Hitchens often accused the Serbian government of committing numerous war crimes during the Yugoslav Wars. He denounced Noam Chomsky and Edward S. Herman, who criticised the NATO intervention there. Hitchens also criticised Croatian president Franjo Tuđman and the policies of the Croatian government, which he saw as reviving "Ustashe formations".

Hitchens was a supporter of the European Union. In an appearance on C-SPAN in 1993, Hitchens said, "As of 1992, there is now a Euro passport that makes you free to travel within the boundaries of ... member countries, and I've always liked the idea of European unity, and so I held out for a Euro passport. So I travel as a European." Speaking at the launch of his brother Peter's book, The Abolition of Britain, at Conway Hall in London, Hitchens denounced the so-called Eurosceptic movement, describing it as "the British version of fascism". He went on to say, "Scepticism is a title of honour. These people are not sceptical. They're fanatical. They're dogmatic".

Following the November 2008 terrorist attacks in Mumbai, Hitchens argued in a radio interview with Hugh Hewitt that Pakistan's Inter-Services Intelligence (ISI) bore substantial responsibility for the attacks and pressed for the United States to realign its South Asia policy away from Pakistan and more firmly toward India. He stated that Pakistan had used militant groups as proxies "to colonize Afghanistan" and to apply "strategic depth against India in Kashmir," and described Pakistan as a "rogue, failed state."

== Critiques of individuals ==
Hitchens wrote book-length biographical essays on Thomas Jefferson (Thomas Jefferson: Author of America), Thomas Paine (Thomas Paine's "Rights of Man": A Biography), and George Orwell (Why Orwell Matters).

He also became known for excoriating criticisms of public contemporary figures, including Mother Teresa, Bill Clinton, and Henry Kissinger, the subjects of three full-length texts: The Missionary Position: Mother Teresa in Theory and Practice, No One Left to Lie To: The Triangulations of William Jefferson Clinton, and The Trial of Henry Kissinger.

Writers Nancy Gibbs and Michael Duffy published an article in Time in 2007, claiming that Hitchens, while promoting his book God Is Not Great: How Religion Poisons Everything, described the Christian evangelist Billy Graham as "a self-conscious fraud" and "a disgustingly evil man" and that the evangelist had made a living by "going around spouting lies to young people. What a horrible career. I gather it's soon to be over. I certainly hope so".

They challenged Hitchens's suggestion that Graham went into ministry to make money. They argued that during his career Graham "turn[ed] down million-dollar television and Hollywood offers". While broadly condemning Hitchens's comments at a time when Graham's health was failing, they mention he was "on more solid ground" when criticising Graham's "vile", if later retracted, remarks about Jews in his 1972 Oval Office meeting with Richard Nixon.

In 1999, Hitchens wrote a profile of Donald Trump for The Sunday Herald. Trump had expressed interest in running in the 2000 United States presidential election as a candidate for the Reform Party. Of Trump, Hitchens said:

Because the man with many monikers in many ways embodies his country and because this election cycle is now so absurd, and so much up for grabs, it is unwise to exclude anything.... The best guess has to be that here's a man who hates to be alone, who needs approval and reinforcement, who talks a better game than he plays, who is crude, hyperactive, emotional, and optimistic.

Hitchens had previously written that Trump demonstrated how "nobody is more covetous and greedy than those who have far too much".

== Criticism of religion ==
Hitchens was an antitheist, and said that a person "could be an atheist and wish that belief in God were correct", but that "an antitheist, a term I'm trying to get into circulation, is someone who is relieved that there's no evidence for such an assertion". He often spoke against the Abrahamic religions. When asked by readers of The Independent what he considered to be the "axis of evil", Hitchens replied "Christianity, Judaism, Islam – the three leading monotheisms". In debates Hitchens often posed what has become known as "Hitchens's Challenge": to name at least one moral action that a person without a faith (i.e. an atheist or antitheist) could not possibly perform, and conversely, to name one immoral action that only a person with a faith could perform or has performed in the past.

Writing for Vanity Fair from Amritsar in August 1997, Hitchens condemned the 1992 demolition of the Babri Masjid in Ayodhya as "a crowning disgrace," and characterised the growing Hindu nationalist movement in India as "quasi-fascist" and "semi-criminal."

In his best-seller God Is Not Great, Hitchens expanded his criticism to include all religions, including those rarely attacked by Western secularists, such as Hinduism, Buddhism and neo-paganism. Hitchens said that organised religion is "the main source of hatred in the world", calling it "violent, irrational, intolerant, allied to racism, tribalism, and bigotry, invested in ignorance and hostile to free inquiry, contemptuous of women and coercive toward children: [it] ought to have a great deal on its conscience". In the same work Hitchens says that humanity therefore needs a renewed Enlightenment. The book received mixed responses, ranging from praise in The New York Times for his "logical flourishes and conundrums" to accusations of "intellectual and moral shabbiness" in the Financial Times. God Is Not Great was nominated for a National Book Award on 10 October 2007.

God Is Not Great affirmed Hitchens's position within the "New Atheism" movement. Hitchens was made an honorary associate of the Rationalist International and the National Secular Society shortly after its release, and was later named to the honorary board of distinguished achievers of the Freedom From Religion Foundation. He also joined the advisory board of the Secular Coalition for America, a group of atheists and humanists. Hitchens said he would accept an invitation from any religious leader who wished to debate with him. On 30 September 2007, Richard Dawkins, Hitchens, Sam Harris, and Daniel Dennett met at Hitchens's residence for a private, unmoderated discussion lasting two hours. The event was videotaped and entitled "The Four Horsemen". In it, Hitchens stated that he saw the Maccabean Revolt as the most unfortunate event in human history, due to the reversion from Hellenistic thought and philosophy to messianism and fundamentalism that it constituted. (Note: "The moment where everything went wrong is the moment when the Jewish Hellenists were defeated by the Jewish messiahs, the celebration now benignly known as Hanukkah." — Hitchens) (Note: "As a consequence of the successful Maccabean revolt against Hellenism, so it is said, a puddle of olive oil that should have lasted only for one day managed to burn for eight days. Wow! Certain proof, not just of an Almighty, but of an Almighty with a special fondness for fundamentalists.")

That year Hitchens began a series of written debates on the question "Is Christianity Good for the World?" with the Christian theologian and pastor Douglas Wilson, published in Christianity Today magazine. This exchange eventually became a book with the same title published in 2008. During their promotional tour of the book, they were accompanied by the producer Darren Doane's film crew. Thence Doane produced the film Collision: Is Christianity GOOD for the World?, which was released on 27 October 2009. On 4 April 2009, Hitchens debated William Lane Craig on the existence of God at Biola University. On 19 October 2009, Intelligence Squared explored the question "Is the Catholic Church a force for good in the world?". John Onaiyekan and Ann Widdecombe argued that it was, while Hitchens joined Stephen Fry in arguing that it was not. The latter won the debate according to an audience poll.

Hitchens referred to 'Islamophobia' as a "fake term" that is "dangerous" because it "insinuates that any reservations about Islam must ipso facto be 'phobic'. A phobia is an irrational fear or dislike. Islamic preaching very often manifests precisely this feature, which is why suspicion of it is by no means irrational". On 5 October 2010, Hitchens debated with Tariq Ramadan as to whether Islam was a religion of peace, at 92NY.

On 26 November 2010, Hitchens appeared in Toronto, Ontario, at the Munk Debates, where he debated religion with the former British prime minister Tony Blair, a convert to Roman Catholicism. Blair argued that religion is a force for good, while Hitchens argued against.

Throughout these debates, Hitchens became known for his persuasive and enthusiastic rhetoric. "Wit and eloquence", "verbal barbs and linguistic dexterity", and "self-reference, literary engagement and hyperbole" are all elements of his speeches. The term "hitch-slap" has been used as an informal term among his supporters for a carefully crafted remark designed to humiliate his opponents. Hitchens's line "one asks wistfully if there is no provision in the procedures of military justice for them to be taken out and shot", condemning the perpetrators of the Abu Ghraib torture and prisoner abuse, was cited by The Humanist as an example. A tribute in Politico stated that this was a trait Hitchens shared with his fellow atheist and intellectual Gore Vidal.

== Personal life ==
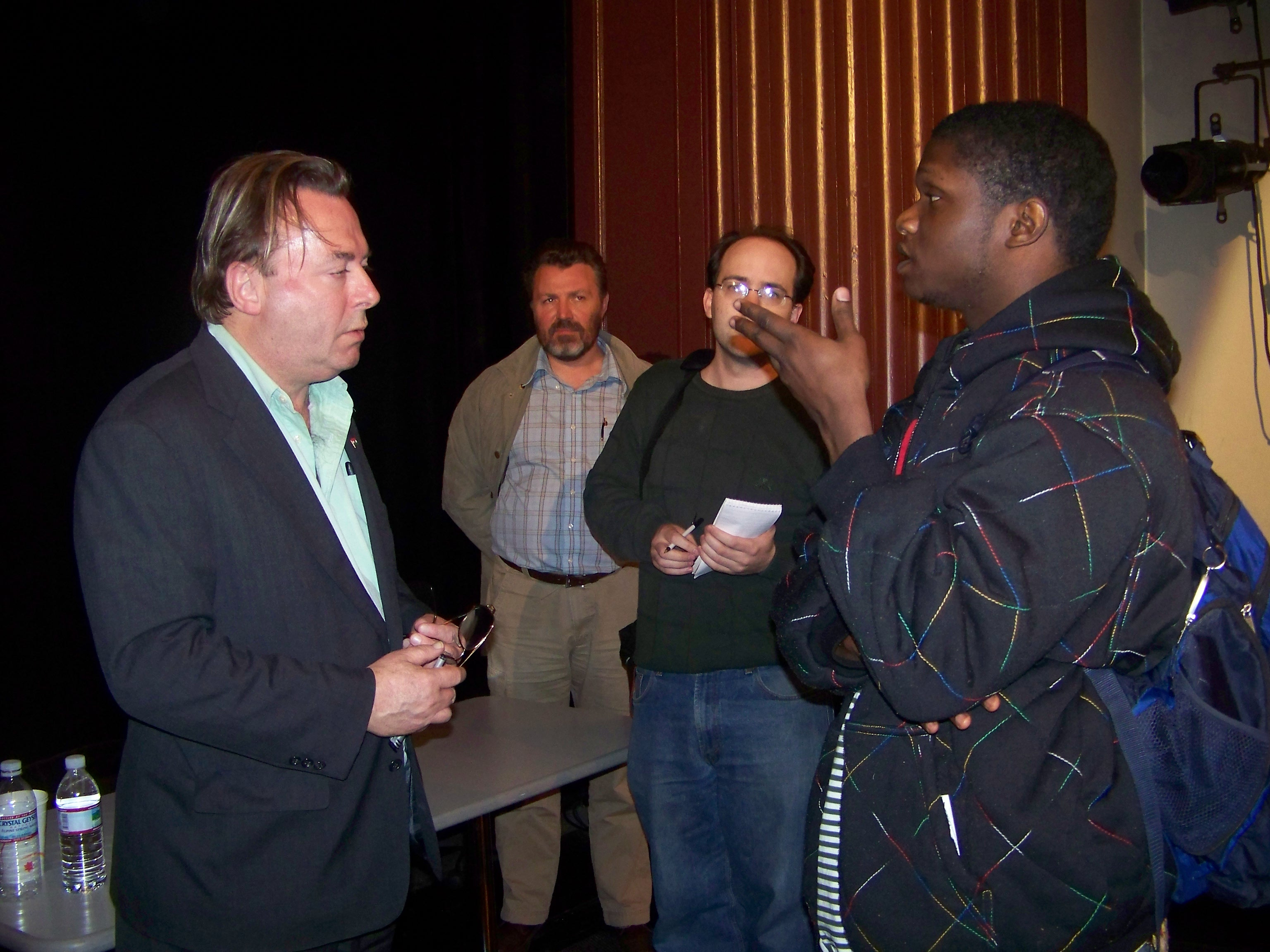
Hitchens after a talk at The College of New Jersey in March 2009

Hitchens was raised nominally Christian and attended Christian boarding schools, but from an early age he declined to participate in communal prayers. Later in life, Hitchens discovered that he was of Jewish descent on his mother's side and that his Jewish ancestors were immigrants from Eastern Europe (including Poland).

Hitchens considered reading, writing, and public speaking not as a job or career but as "what I am, who I am, [and] what I love." (Note: I like to think that I have a life rather than a job or than a career, and it's all to do with reading and writing: The only two things I was ever any good at—and public speaking, which I can also do. that's how I make my living, but it's also what I am, who I am, what I love.)

In November 1973, Hitchens's mother died by suicide in Athens in a pact with her lover, a defrocked clergyman named Timothy Bryan. The pair overdosed on sleeping pills in adjoining hotel rooms and Bryan slashed his wrists in the bathtub. Hitchens flew alone to Athens to recover his mother's body, initially under the impression that she had been murdered.

Hitchens was a regular alcohol drinker, known for his love of Scotch whisky particularly Johnnie Walker's Black Label blend, which he referred to as the "breakfast of champions". Penn Jillette claims to have refused to admit Hitchens into his Las Vegas home during a social visit, unless Hitchens left behind a bottle of alcohol that he had brought. In the early 2000s, Modern Drunkard Magazine repeatedly attempted to secure an interview with Hitchens on the subject of alcohol, but was rebuffed because Hitchens stated that he already had "too many enemies".

Hitchens's ability to combine heavy drinking with a prolific writing schedule was regarded by acquaintances as a remarkable feat of mental and physical stamina. Following his death in 2011, former British MP Denis MacShane, who had known Hitchens at Oxford, recalled that Hitchens "would drink a bottle of whisky when I would manage two glasses of wine and then be up in the morning writing 1,000 perfect words." Journalist Alexander Linklater gave a similar account in a 2008 profile for Prospect, describing Hitchens continuing an evening of conversation and whisky until around 4:30 a.m., while also producing articles during their time together.

In 2007, after living in the United States for twenty-five years, Hitchens became an American citizen, electing to retain his UK citizenship.

=== Marriages ===
Hitchens was married twice, first to Eleni Meleagrou, a Greek Cypriot, in 1981. In 1991 Hitchens married his second wife, Carol Blue, an American screenwriter, in a ceremony held at the apartment of Victor Navasky, editor of The Nation. They had a daughter together.

Hitchens spent part of his early career in journalism as a foreign correspondent in Cyprus. Hitchens continued writing essay-style correspondence pieces from a variety of locales, including Chad, Uganda, and the Darfur region of Sudan. In 1991, he received a Lannan Literary Award for Nonfiction.

Hitchens met Carol Blue in Los Angeles in 1989; Hitchens called it love at first sight. In 1999, Hitchens and Blue, both harsh critics of Bill Clinton, submitted an affidavit to the trial managers of the Republican Party in the impeachment of Clinton. Therein they swore that their then-friend Sidney Blumenthal had described Monica Lewinsky as a stalker. This allegation contradicted Blumenthal's own sworn deposition in the trial, and it resulted in a hostile exchange of opinion in the public sphere between Hitchens and Blumenthal. Following the publication of Blumenthal's The Clinton Wars, Hitchens wrote several pieces in which he accused Blumenthal of manipulating the facts. The incident ended their friendship and sparked a personal crisis for Hitchens, who was stridently criticised by friends for what they saw as a cynical and ultimately politically futile act.

=== Relationship with his brother ===
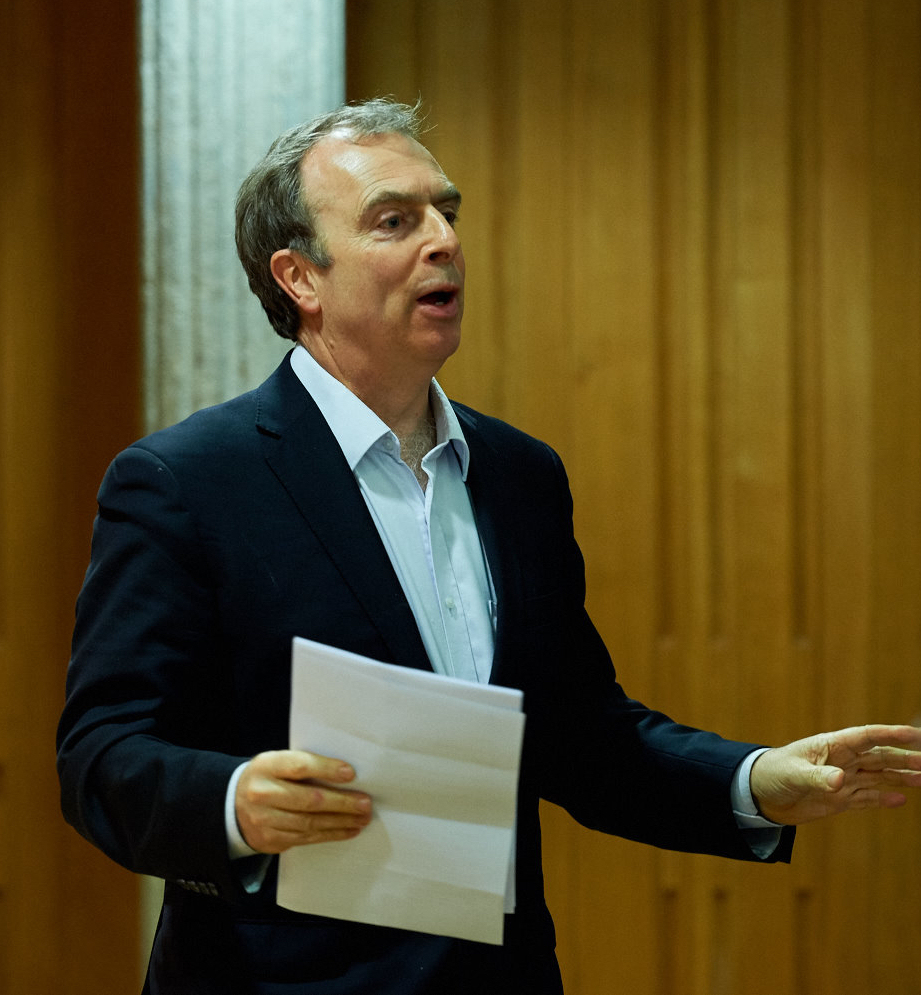
Peter Hitchens, Christopher's brother, in 2015

The journalist and author Peter Hitchens is Christopher's younger brother by two years. Christopher said in 2005 the main difference between the two is belief in the existence of God. Peter became a member of the International Socialists (forerunners of the modern Socialist Workers' Party) from 1968 to 1975 (beginning at age 17) after Christopher introduced him to them.

The brothers reportedly fell out after Peter wrote a 2001 article in The Spectator which allegedly characterised Christopher as a Stalinist. After the birth of Peter's third child, the brothers were reconciled. Peter's review of God Is Not Great led to a public disagreement between the brothers but no renewed estrangement.

In 2007 the brothers appeared as panellists on BBC TV's Question Time, where they clashed on a number of issues. In 2008, in the US, they debated the 2003 invasion of Iraq and the existence of God. In 2010 at the Pew Forum, the pair debated the nature of God in civilisation. At the memorial service held for Christopher in New York, Peter read a passage from St Paul's Epistle to the Philippians.

== Illness and death ==
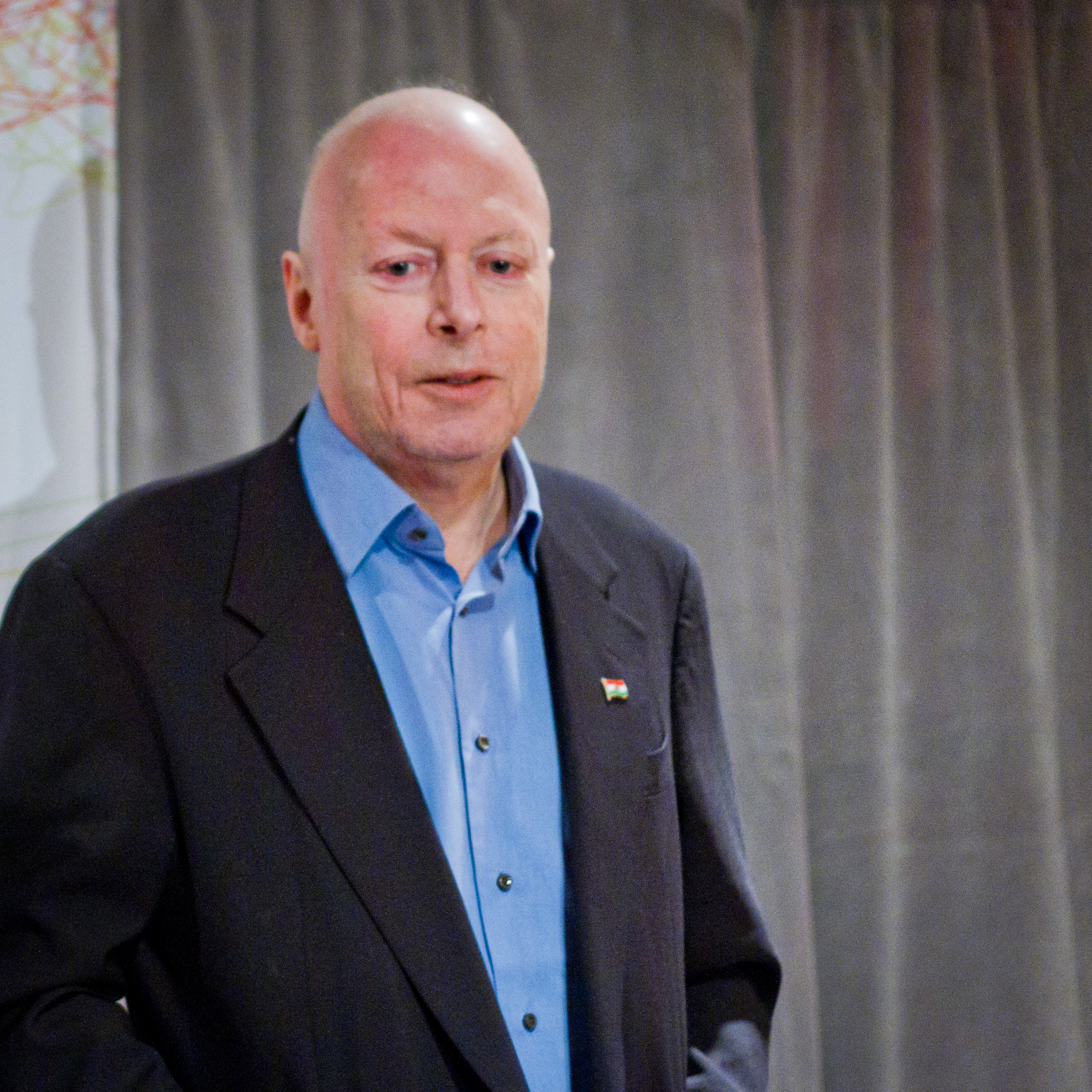
Hitchens in November 2010

External videos
- Q&A interview with Hitchens, following his diagnosis with esophageal cancer, 23 January 2011, C-SPAN

On 8 June 2010, Hitchens was on tour in New York promoting his memoirs Hitch-22 when he was taken into emergency care suffering from a severe pericardial effusion. Soon after, he announced he was postponing his tour to undergo treatment for oesophageal cancer.

In a Vanity Fair piece published in 2010, titled "Topic of Cancer", he stated that he was undergoing treatment for cancer. He said that he recognised the long-term prognosis was far from positive and he would be a "very lucky person to live another five years". A heavy smoker and drinker since his teenage years, Hitchens acknowledged that these habits were likely to have contributed to his illness. During his illness, Hitchens was under the care of Francis Collins and was the subject of Collins's new cancer treatment, which maps out the human genome and selectively targets damaged DNA. (Note: In an interview with the UK Telegraph magazine, Hitchens said that Collins, who was formerly the director of the National Center for Human Genome Research and now serves as director of the National Institutes of Health, is partially responsible for developing a new cancer treatment that maps out the patient's entire genetic make-up and targets damaged DNA.)

According to Christopher Buckley, before Hitchens died, his estranged friend Sidney Blumenthal wrote to Hitchens. Buckley said the letter contained words of "tenderness and comfort and implicit forgiveness".

Hitchens died of pneumonia on 15 December 2011 in the University of Texas MD Anderson Cancer Center, Houston, aged 62. According to Andrew Sullivan, his last words were "Capitalism. Downfall." (Note: Then he dozed a little, and then roused himself and uttered a couple of words that were close to inaudible. Steve asked him to repeat them. There were two: Capitalism. Downfall. In his end was his beginning.) In accordance with Hitchens's wishes, his body was donated to medical research. Mortality, a collection of seven of Hitchens's Vanity Fair essays about his illness, was published posthumously in September 2012.

=== Reactions to death ===
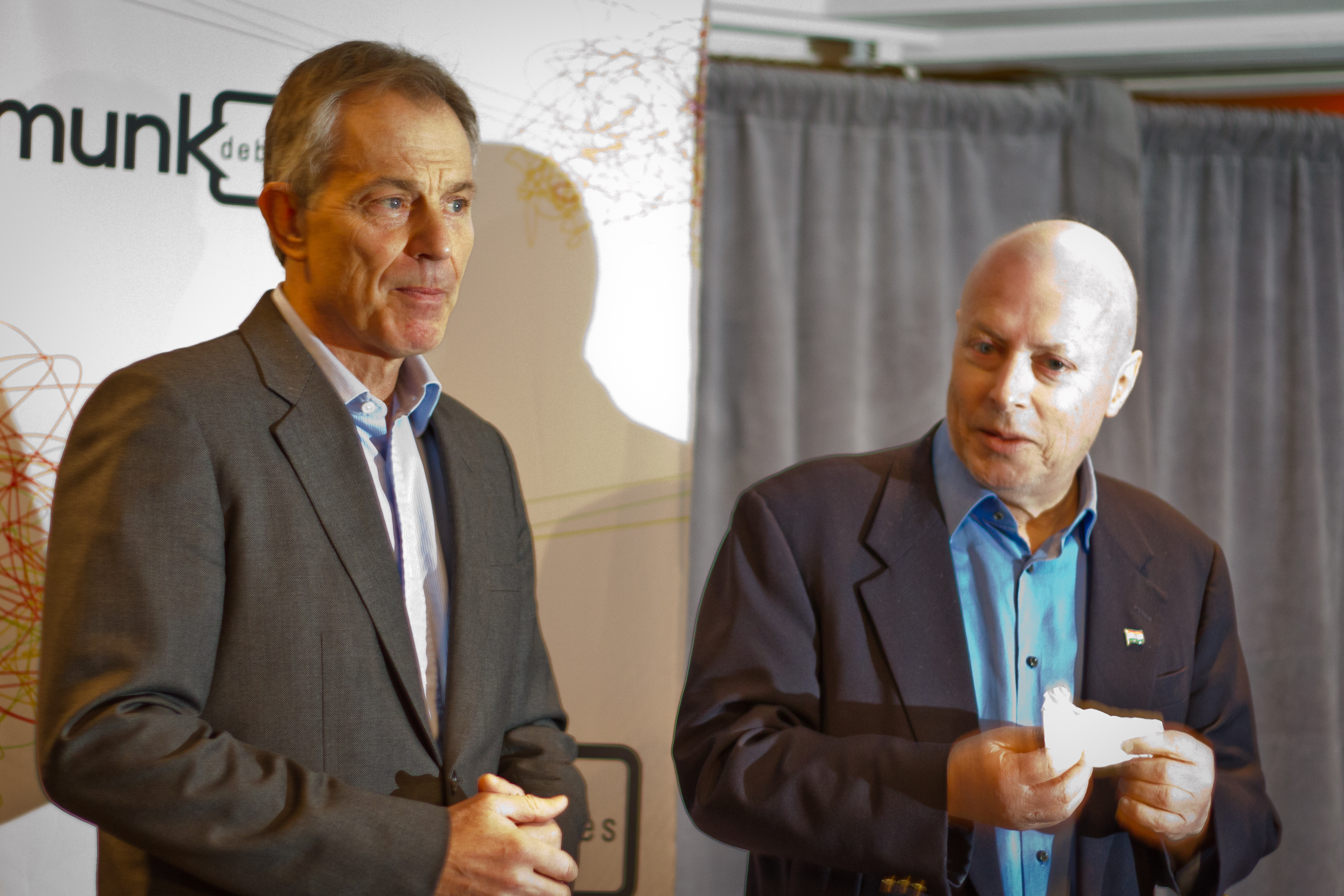
Former British prime minister Tony Blair and Hitchens at the Munk debate on religion, Toronto, November 2010

Former British prime minister Tony Blair said, "Christopher Hitchens was a complete one-off, an amazing mixture of writer, journalist, polemicist and unique character. He was fearless in the pursuit of truth and any cause in which he believed. And there was no belief he held that he did not advocate with passion, commitment and brilliance. He was an extraordinary, compelling and colourful human being whom it was a privilege to know."

Richard Dawkins said of Hitchens, "He was a polymath, a wit, immensely knowledgeable, and a valiant fighter against all tyrants, including imaginary supernatural ones." Dawkins later described Hitchens as "probably the best orator I've ever heard", and called his death "an enormous loss".

External videos
- "A tribute to Christopher Hitchens", hosted by Vanity Fair magazine, 20 April 2012, C-SPAN

The American theoretical physicist and cosmologist Lawrence Krauss said:

Christopher was a beacon of knowledge and light in a world that constantly threatens to extinguish both. He had the courage to accept the world for just what it is and not what he wanted it to be. That's the highest praise, I believe, one can give to any intellect. He understood that the universe doesn't care about our existence or welfare, and he epitomized the realization that our lives have meaning only to the extent that we give them meaning.

Bill Maher paid tribute to Hitchens on his show Real Time with Bill Maher, saying, "We lost a hero of mine, a friend, and one of the great talk show guests of all time." Salman Rushdie and Stephen Fry paid tribute at the Christopher Hitchens Vanity Fair Memorial 2012.

The British conservative author and friend of Hitchens Douglas Murray paid tribute to him in an article in The Spectator, recalling personal experiences with him.

Three weeks before Hitchens's death, George Eaton of the New Statesman wrote, "He is determined to ensure that he is not remembered simply as a 'lefty who turned right' or as a contrarian and provocateur. Throughout his career, he has retained a commitment to the Enlightenment values of reason, secularism, and pluralism. His targets—Mother Teresa, Bill Clinton, Henry Kissinger, God—are chosen not at random, but rather because they have offended one or more of these principles. The tragedy of Hitchens's illness is that it came at a time when he enjoyed a larger audience than ever. The great polemicist is certain to be remembered, but, as he was increasingly aware, perhaps not as he would like." The Chronicle of Higher Education asked whether Hitchens was the last public intellectual.

Larry Taunton's book The Faith of Christopher Hitchens, released after Hitchens's death, claimed that Hitchens started to flirt with spirituality toward the end of his life. Richard Dawkins, in an interview with Alex O’Connor, called it "a disgraceful book. [Taunton] took advantage of a long car journey he had with Christopher Hitchens and I think Christopher was probably being polite and talking seriously to him about his religion." Dawkins added, "Religious apologists are so eager to get deathbed conversions that you have to watch it. Well actually, Christopher I think himself said that, 'if anybody claims that I had a deathbed conversion you can be absolutely sure that I wasn't in my right mind when it happened'." David Frum, writing in The Atlantic, states, "In the months before he died, Hitchens repeatedly and emphatically warned that claims like Taunton's would be forthcoming and should be disbelieved." In an interview with CNN's Anderson Cooper in August 2010, Hitchens referred to the possibility of a deathbed conversion as "a pathetic thing" and stated that if such stories came up, they should be disbelieved. In his posthumously published book, Mortality, Hitchens wrote, "If I convert it's because it's better that a believer dies than that an atheist does."

=== The Hitchens Prize ===
In 2015, an annual prize of $50,000 was established in his honour by The Dennis and Victoria Ross Foundation for "an author or journalist whose work reflects a commitment to free expression and inquiry, a range and depth of intellect, and a willingness to pursue the truth without regard to personal or professional consequence". The foundation's website states the Hitchens Prize "seeks to advance what he was dedicated to throughout his life: vigorous, honest, and open public debate and discussion, with no tolerance of orthodoxy, no reverence for authority, and a belief in reasoned dialogue as the best path to the truth". The 2024 winner was Errol Morris.

== Film and television appearances ==
Year	Film, DVD, or TV episode
1984	Opinions: "Greece to their Rome"
1984	Firing Line: "Is There a Liberal Crack-Up?"
1989	Frontiers: "Cyprus: Stranded in Time"
1993	Everything You Need to Know
1993	The Opinions Debate
1994	Tracking Down Maggie: The Unofficial Biography of Margaret Thatcher
1994	Hell's Angel (documentary)
1996	Where's Elvis This Week?
1996–2010	Charlie Rose (13 episodes)
1998	Real Stories: Diana: The Mourning After
1998	Uncommon Knowledge: "The Sixties"
1999–2001	Politically Incorrect with Bill Maher
1999–2002	Dennis Miller Live (TV show; 4 episodes)
2000	The Other Side: Hitch Hike
2002	The Trials of Henry Kissinger
2003	Hidden in Plain Sight
2003–09	Real Time with Bill Maher (TV show; 6 episodes)
2004	Mel Gibson: God's Lethal Weapon
2004	Texas: America Supersized
2004–06	Newsnight (TV show; 3 episodes)
2004–10	The Daily Show (TV show; 4 episodes)
2005	Penn & Teller: Bullshit! (TV show; 1 episode, s03e05)
2005	The Al Franken Show (Radio show; 1 episode)
2005	Confronting Iraq: Conflict and Hope
2005	Heaven on Earth: The Rise and Fall of Socialism
2005–08	Hardball with Chris Matthews (TV show; 3 episodes)
2006	American Zeitgeist
2006	Blog Wars
2007	Manufacturing Dissent
2007	Question Time (1 episode)
2007	Your Mommy Kills Animals
2007	Personal Che
2007	Heckler
2007	In Pot We Trust
2007	Hannity's America
2007	In Depth (C-Span2 Book TV)
2008	Can Atheism Save Europe? (DVD; 9 August 2008 debate with John Lennox at the Edinburgh International Festival)
2008	Discussions with Richard Dawkins: Episode 1: "The Four Horsemen" (DVD; 30 September 2007)
2008	Expelled: No Intelligence Allowed
2009	Holy Hell (Chap. 5 in 6 Part Web Film on iTunes)
2009	God on Trial (DVD; September 2008 debate with Dinesh D'Souza)
2009	President: A Political Road Trip
2009	Collision: "Is Christianity GOOD for the World?" (DVD; Fall 2008 debates with Douglas Wilson)
2009	Does God Exist? (DVD; 4 April 2009 debate with William Lane Craig)
2009	Fighting Words (TV movie; 2009)
2010	Phil Ochs: There But For Fortune
2010	The God Debates, Part I: A Spirited Discussion (DVD; debate with Shmuley Boteach; Host: Mark Derry; Commentary: Miles Redfield)
2011	Is God Great? (DVD; 3 March 2009 debate with John Lennox at Samford University)
2011	92Y: Christopher Hitchens (DVD; 8 June 2010 dialogue with Salman Rushdie at 92nd Street Y)
2011	ABC Lateline (TV show, 2 episodes)
2011	Texas Freethought Convention (DVD; 8 October 2011 Recipient of Richard Dawkins Award, final public appearance)
2013	Gore Vidal: The United States of Amnesia (DVD Documentary)
2015	Best of Enemies (Posthumous release)

== Books ==
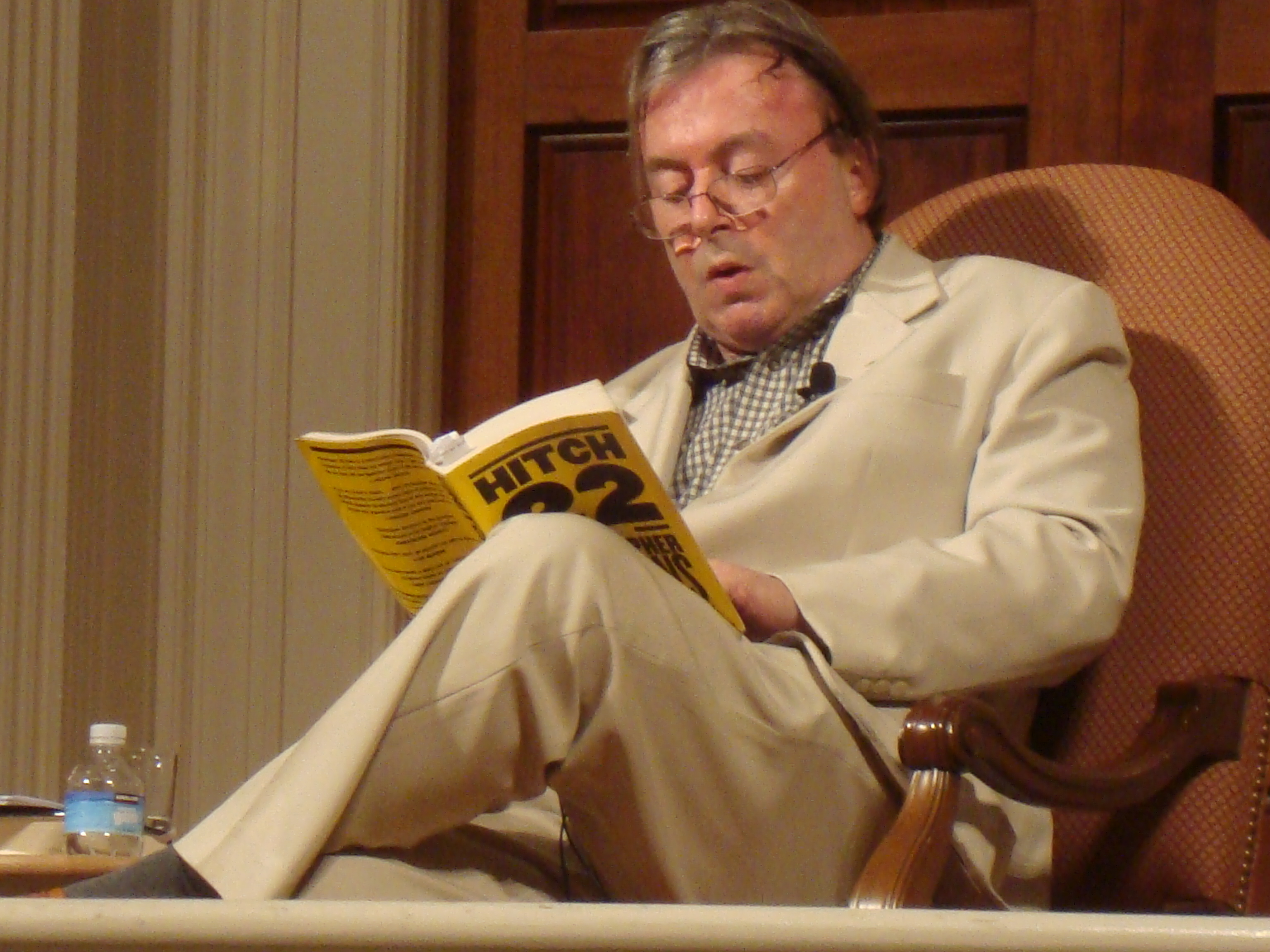
Hitchens reading his memoir Hitch-22 (2010)

- Hitchens, Christopher (1997) [1984]. Hostage to History: Cyprus from the Ottomans to Kissinger (3rd ed.). London: Verso. ISBN 1859841899. OCLC 37902807.
- Hitchens, Christopher (1987). Imperial Spoils: The Curious Case of the Elgin Marbles. Hill and Wang. ISBN 0809041898. OCLC 17764901.
- Said, Edward W.; Hitchens, Christopher, eds. (2001) [1988]. Blaming the Victims: Spurious Scholarship and the Palestinian Question. London: Verso. ISBN 1859843409. OCLC 47969559.
- Hitchens, Christopher (2014) [1988]. Prepared for the Worst: Selected Essays and Minority Reports (1st ed.). New York: Hill and Wang. ISBN 978-0809078677. OCLC 1012775824.
- Hitchens, Christopher (1990). The Monarchy: A Critique of Britain's Favorite Fetish. London: Chatto & Windus. ISBN 978-0701135553.
- 1990: Blood, Class and Nostalgia: Anglo-American Ironies, Farrar Straus & Giroux (T), ISBN 978-0374114435
- 1993: For the Sake of Argument: Essays and Minority Reports, Verso, ISBN 0860914356
- 1995: The Missionary Position: Mother Teresa in Theory and Practice, Verso
- 1997: The Parthenon Marbles: The Case for Reunification, Verso, ISBN 1786631822
- 1999: No One Left to Lie To: The Values of the Worst Family, original hardcover title: No One Left to Lie To: The Triangulations of William Jefferson Clinton, Verso
- 2000: Unacknowledged Legislation: Writers in the Public Sphere, Verso, ISBN 9781859847862
- 2001: The Trial of Henry Kissinger, Verso, ISBN 1859843980
- 2001: Letters to a Young Contrarian, Basic Books
- 2002: Left Hooks, Right Crosses: A Decade of Political Writing, Bold Type Books, ISBN 1560254092
- 2002: Orwell's Victory, Allen Lane/Penguin Press, ISBN 0-713-99-584-X (UK Edition). US edition as Why Orwell Matters, Basic Books, ISBN 0-465-03050-5
- 2003: A Long Short War: The Postponed Liberation of Iraq, Plume/Penguin Group, ISBN 0452284988
- 2004: Love, Poverty, and War: Journeys and Essays, Thunder's Mouth, Nation Books, ISBN 1560255803
- 2005: Thomas Jefferson: Author of America, Eminent Lives/Atlas Books/HarperCollins Publishers, ISBN 0060598964
- 2007: Thomas Paine's Rights of Man: A Biography, Atlantic Monthly Press, ISBN 0871139553
- 2007: God Is Not Great: How Religion Poisons Everything, Twelve/Hachette Book Group USA/Warner Books, ISBN 0446579807 / Published in the UK as God is not Great: The Case Against Religion, Atlantic Books, ISBN 978-1843545866
- 2007: The Portable Atheist: Essential Readings for the Non-Believer, [Editor] Perseus Publishing. ISBN 978-0306816086
- 2008: Christopher Hitchens and His Critics: Terror, Iraq and the Left (with Simon Cottee and Thomas Cushman), New York University Press, ISBN 0814716873
- 2008: Is Christianity Good for the World? (co-author, with Douglas Wilson), Canon Press, ISBN 1591280532
- 2010: Hitch-22: A Memoir, Twelve, ISBN 978-0446540339 OCLC 464590644
- 2011: Arguably: Essays by Christopher Hitchens, Twelve. UK edition as Arguably: Selected Prose, Atlantic, ISBN 978-1455502776
- 2012: Mortality, Twelve, ISBN 978-1455502752. UK edition as Mortality, Atlantic Books, ISBN 978-1848879218
- 2015: And Yet...: Essays, Simon & Schuster, ISBN 978-1476772066
- 2024: A Hitch in Time: Reflections Ready for Reconsideration, Twelve, ISBN 978-1538757659
