= Hitch-22 =

2010 memoir by Christopher Hitchens

Hitch-22: A Memoir
- Author: Christopher Hitchens
- Language: English
- Subject: Autobiography
- Publisher: Twelve Books, Atlantic Books (UK)
- Publication date: 20 May 2010 (UK) June 2, 2011
- Publication place: United States
- Media type: Hardcover, paperback, audiobook
- Pages: 448 (inc 24 pages of photographs)
- ISBN: 978-0-446-54033-9
- OCLC: 464590644
- Dewey Decimal: 920.073
- LC Class: CT275.H62575 A3 2010

Hitch-22: A Memoir is a memoir written by author and journalist Christopher Hitchens. The book was published in May 2010 by Atlantic Books in the UK and June 2011 by Twelve, an imprint of Hachette Book Group USA, and was later nominated for a National Book Critics Circle Award. The planned worldwide tour for the book was cut short later the same month during the American leg so that the author could begin treatment for newly diagnosed esophageal cancer. Through the book's publisher and in the magazine for which he was a regular contributing editor, Vanity Fair, Hitchens announced: 'I regret having had to cancel so many engagements at such short notice.'

== Description ==
Hitchens initially found the book hard to write: 'I found it fantastically difficult. Normally, when I'm writing, I'm making an argument, making a case. Also, when I'm writing, I'm trying to see how much I can pack into 5,000 words about a subject. But here's a subject I know too much about.' But he eventually produced a manuscript that was twice the length of the version finally published.

Hitchens used his memoir to discuss several incidents that were later picked up by reviewers and the media as notable for their revelatory nature: as a contemporary at Oxford University of the then-student Bill Clinton (who later became the American President), he knew that Clinton's later avowal that 'I did not inhale' in regard to marijuana was based on Clinton's allergy to smoke; but Hitchens also states that Clinton's consumption was via 'cookies and brownies'; that during the writing of Martin Amis's novel, Money, Hitchens and Amis visited a New York brothel so that Amis could research the experience; that during an encounter at a party with the then British Leader of the Opposition, Margaret Thatcher, she proceeded to 'spank Hitchens directly on the buttocks' and call him a 'Naughty boy!'

== New foreword ==
The paperback edition of the book, published in 2011, featured a new foreword by Hitchens which mentions his newly diagnosed cancer: "I suffer from Stage Four oesophageal cancer," he writes. "There is no Stage Five." And "I hope it will not seem presumptuous to assume that anybody likely to have got as far as acquiring this paperback edition of my memoir will know that it was written by someone who, without appreciating it at the time, had become seriously and perhaps mortally ill... When the book was published, I had just turned sixty-one. I am writing this at a moment when, according to my doctors, I cannot be certain of celebrating another birthday."

== Critical reception ==
Comments from critic Dwight Garner's article in The New York Times Book Review are quoted on the back cover. "Electric and electrifying... He has a mind like a Swiss Army knife, ready to carve up or unbolt an opponent's arguments with a flick of the wrist." and "It is a fascinating, funny, sad, incisive, and serious narrative...' by Alexander Waugh of The Spectator.

Hitchens died of esophageal cancer in 2011, aged 62. His autobiography received positive reviews, and some critics felt his prose was impressive and his wit incisive.
