= No One Left to Lie To =

1999 book by Christopher Hitchens

No One Left to Lie To: The Triangulations of William Jefferson Clinton
- First edition cover (1999)
- Author: Christopher Hitchens
- Language: English
- Subject: Bill Clinton
- Publisher: Verso Books
- Publication date: 1999
- Publication place: United States/United Kingdom
- Media type: Print (hardcover and paperback)
- Pages: 122 (original hardback); 160 (expanded paperback)
- ISBN: 978-1859847367
- Dewey Decimal: 973.929/092
- LC Class: E886.2 .H58 1999

No One Left to Lie To: The Triangulations of William Jefferson Clinton is a 1999 book about President of the United States Bill Clinton by author and journalist Christopher Hitchens. It was first published in hardback by the New Left Review imprint, Verso Books.

== Synopsis ==
The book is journalist and essayist Christopher Hitchens's polemic on the political career of American president Bill Clinton. Hitchens examines Clinton's psychology and how it affected the then-president's record in war, acts that led to accusations of sexual abuse, his skill at "triangulation" and his relationship with his wife Hillary.

Discussing the book on the April 28, 1999, episode of Charlie Rose, Hitchens said he wrote the book to criticize what he perceived as Clinton's political corruption and conservatism, seeing them as mutually reinforcing. He was also critical of many mainstream American liberals for their support of Clinton.

=== Paperback edition ===
Its re-publication in paperback in 2000 featured expanded content, a new subtitle (The Values of the Worst Family), and an additional image of Hillary Clinton on the front cover.

== Reception ==
No One Left to Lie To drew mixed responses. Referring to the work as "at once illuminating and depressing", Stephen Thompson of The A.V. Club wrote that Hitchens "ultimately does an excellent and revelatory job of not only breaking down Clinton's various alleged and provable offenses [...] but tying them together, making a case for how his much-discussed character flaws actually affect his ability to serve the people." Nick Cohen of The Observer defended Hitchens's comparison of Clinton's America to a banana republic, and praised the chapter on the president's war crimes. Edward Said of Al-Ahram Weekly praised the book as "By far the best of all the books on the Clinton era". Carla Power of Newsweek referred to the book as "witty" and "well researched". The Economist praised the book for its passionate critique of the Clinton administration.

Conversely Louis Menand wrote in The New York Times Magazine that the book fed the reader's confirmation bias, that it served to "confirm every prejudice you ever had on the subject, plus a few you might not even have known you had". In the London Review of Books, Martin Jay criticized the lack of footnotes and argued that "the book is itself an extended op-ed piece, resting more on avid belief and strongly held opinions than hard, dispassionately presented knowledge, and liberally drawing on its author's formidable rhetorical skills to convince the reader. Hitchens's argument is based on a welter of assertions about Clinton's actions – many of which, I hasten to add, are all too plausible – that are never backed up in a convincing way by verifiable sources". Charles Taylor of Salon accused Hitchens of making unsubstantiated accusations and wrote that "the damnable thing about No One Left to Lie To is that had Hitchens focused on [Clinton's triangulations], he might have produced a very compelling and very damaging book." Karen Lehrman of The New York Times, while lauding "Hitchens's brave willingness to show all the sordid scenarios in which our emperor has removed his clothes", found the book emotionally undisciplined in the depth of its negativity toward Clinton, writing that the author "is appalled by virtually everything the President does."
