= James Ley (literary critic) =

Australian literary critic and essayist

- Born: 1971 (age 54–55); Whyalla, South Australia
- Education: University of New England; University of Melbourne; University of Western Sydney
- Occupation: Critic
- Writing career
- Notable awards: Geraldine Pascall Prize for Critical Writing

James Ley (born 1971) is an Australian literary critic and essayist.

== Early life and education ==
James Ley was born in South Australia and grew up in Armidale, New South Wales.

== Career ==
After some time as a freelance critic, Ley founded the Sydney Review of Books. For the Sydney Review of Books, he has written essays on writers such as Ali Smith, Lydia Davis, Vladimir Sorokin, Ottessa Moshfegh, and Helen Garner. He has been a judge for major fiction prizes in Australia.

He is a prolific critic of Australian Literature. When he won the Geraldine Pascall Prize for Australian Critic of the Year, the judges stated that: 'He operates at the point where scholarly precision and essayistic liberty intersect. ... In a Ley review, you may be sure that an independent opinion informed by wide reading and sharp thinking is being stated'.

== Selected works ==
- The Critic in the Modern World : Public Criticism from Samuel Johnson to James Wood. 2014.
- The Australian Face : Essays from the Sydney Review of Books. 2017.
