= New Atheism =

21st-century antitheist movement

New Atheism or Neo-Atheism, sometimes referred to as scientific atheism, is a 21st-century movement attributed to some atheist academics, writers, scientists, and philosophers opposed to superstition, religion, and irrationalism. New Atheists advocate the antitheist view that the various forms of theism should be examined, countered by rational and scientific arguments, and criticised, especially when they exert strong influence on the broader society, such as in government, education, and politics.

Major figures of New Atheism include Richard Dawkins, Daniel Dennett, Christopher Hitchens, and Sam Harris, sometimes collectively referred to as the "Four Horsemen" of the movement. Proponents of the New Atheist movement have experienced criticism from academics and other atheists.

== Origins and terminology ==
The term New Atheism is usually traced to Gary Wolf's 2006 Wired article "The Church of the Non-Believers", in which he introduced the label in a critical context and portrayed writers such as Richard Dawkins, Sam Harris and Daniel Dennett as unusually strident and combative critics of religion. Scholars have often treated it as a label that emerged from media discussion rather than as the name of a clearly defined school of thought. James E. Taylor writes that the label arose from journalistic commentary on books by Sam Harris, Richard Dawkins, Daniel Dennett and Christopher Hitchens, while Christopher R. Cotter describes the early discussion of New Atheism as "scholarly, but largely journalistic". Thomas Zenk likewise argues that New Atheism is an umbrella term rooted in public discourse and cautions against using it uncritically as an analytical category; he also notes that the label does not necessarily correspond to the self-identification of those to whom it is applied. Steven Kettell argues that the label's popularisation was not merely descriptive, but also encouraged the view that a small group of atheist writers were both unusually militant and philosophically unoriginal.

== Prominent figures ==
=== The "Four Horsemen" ===
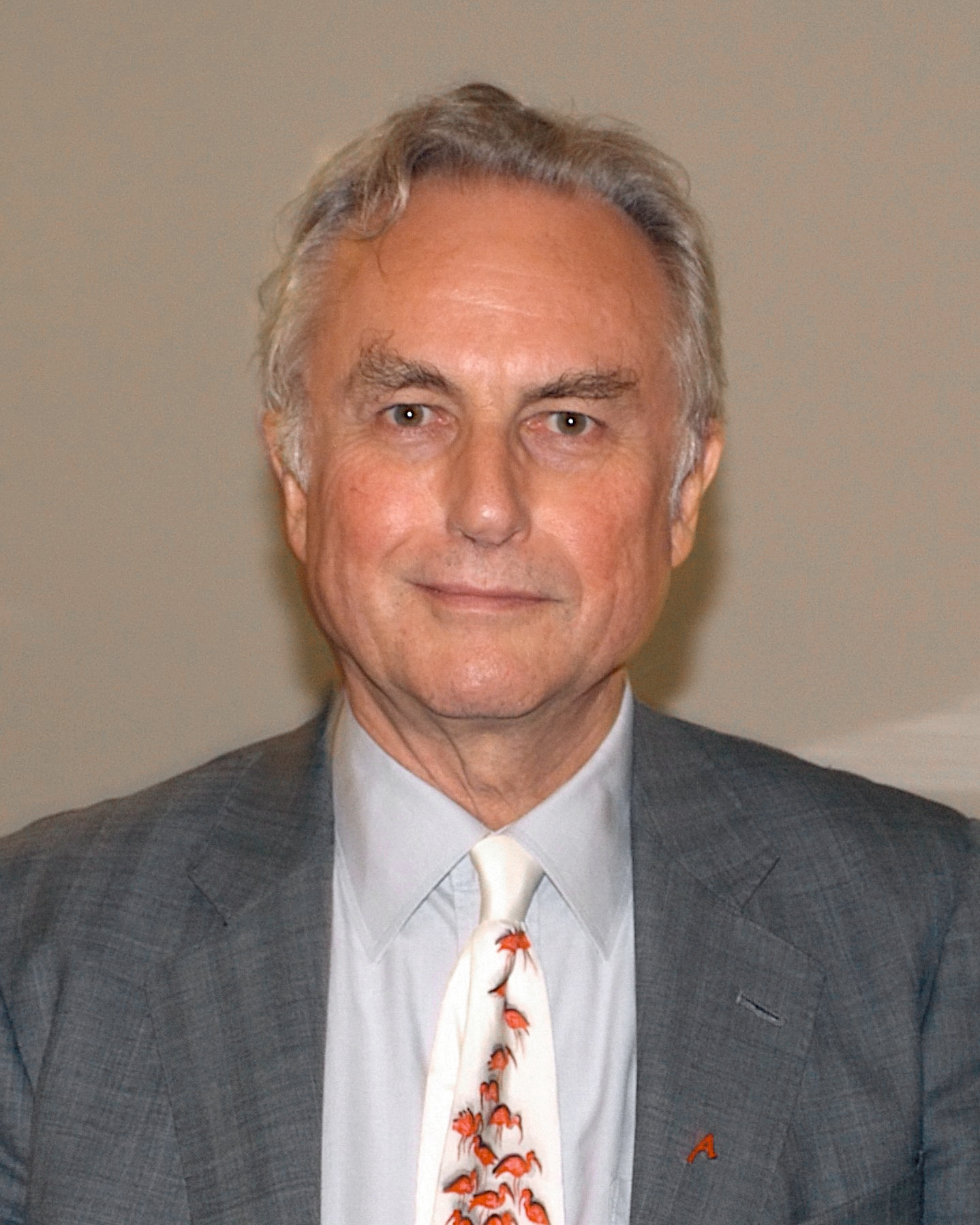
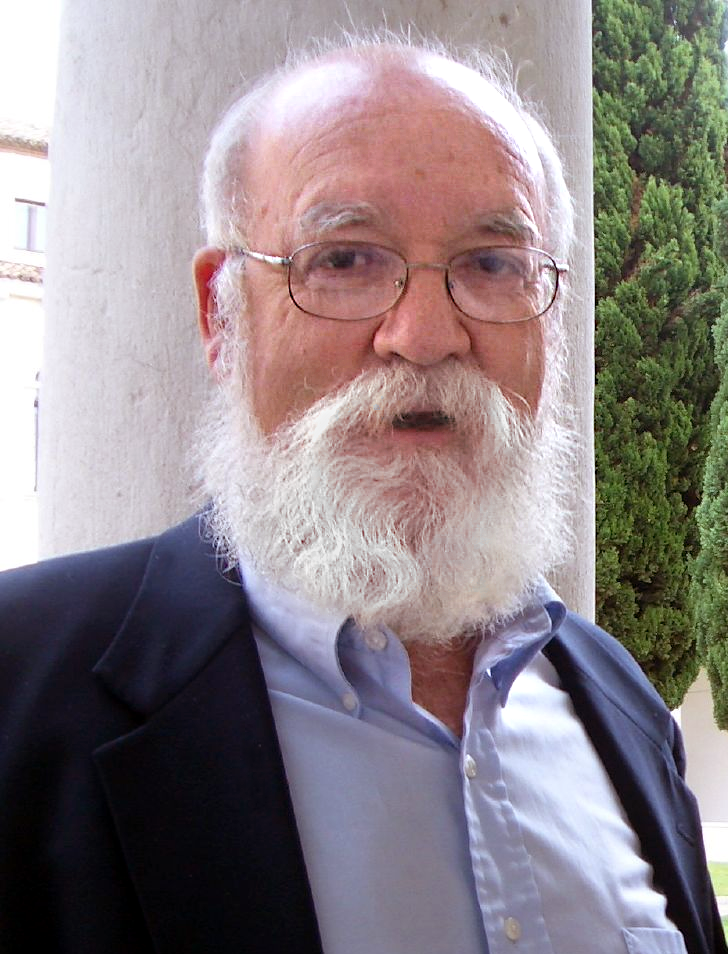
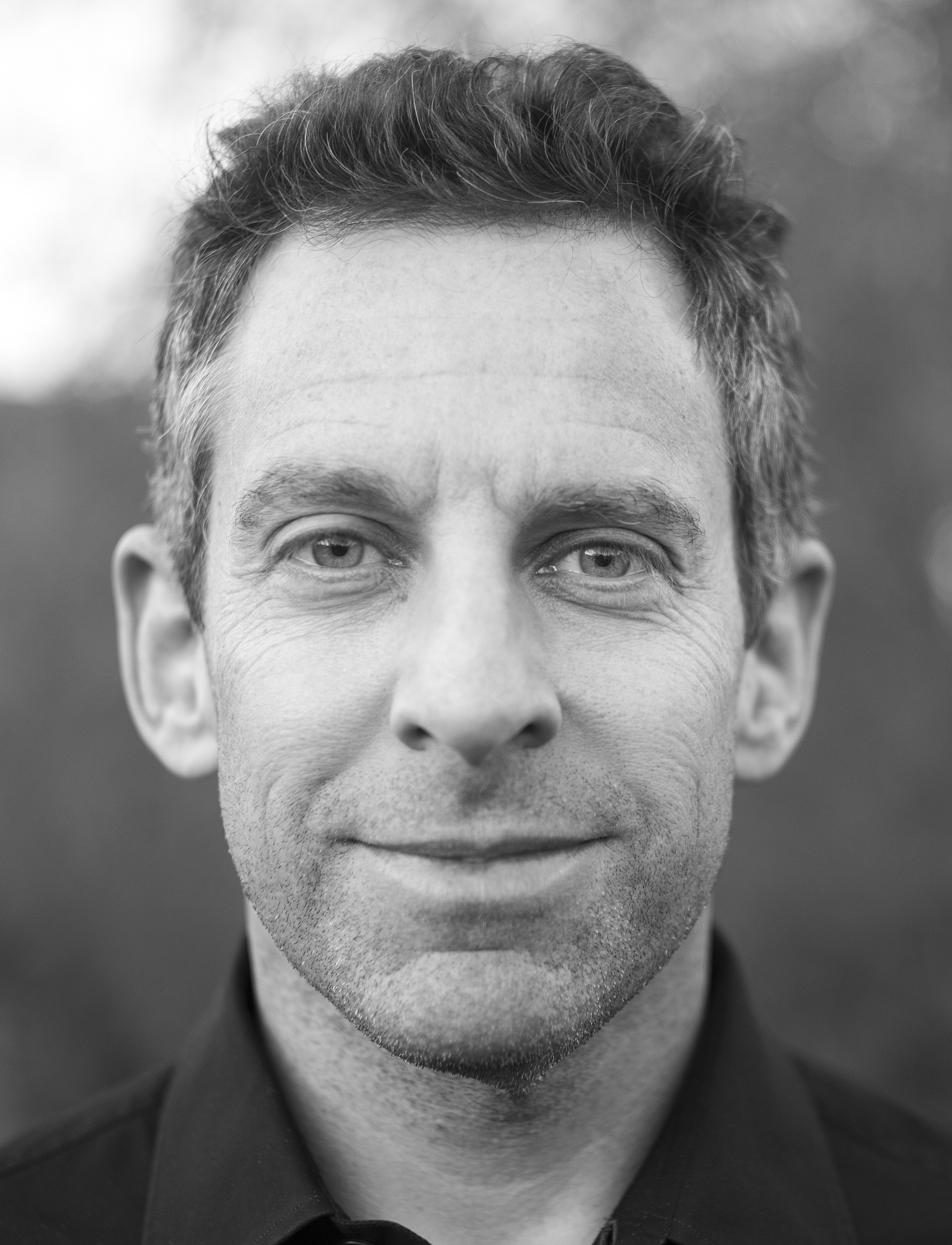
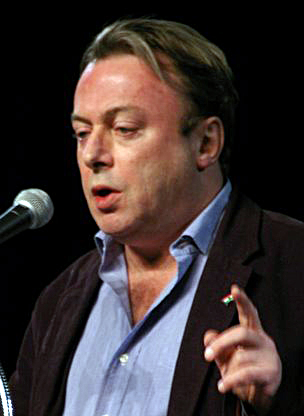
The "Four Horsemen" of New Atheism (clockwise from top left): Richard Dawkins (b. 1941), Daniel Dennett (1942–2024), Christopher Hitchens (1949–2011), and Sam Harris (b. 1967)

Key figures associated with New Atheism include evolutionary biologist Richard Dawkins, philosopher and neuroscientist Sam Harris, philosopher and cognitive scientist Daniel Dennett, and journalist Christopher Hitchens. The four are often collectively referred to as the "Four Horsemen", an allusion to the biblical Four Horsemen of the Apocalypse from the Book of Revelation. Before her 2023 conversion to Christianity, writer and politician Ayaan Hirsi Ali was sometimes referred to as the fifth "Horseman" or "Horsewoman" of New Atheism.

On 30 September 2007, Dawkins, Harris, Hitchens, and Dennett met at Hitchens' residence in Washington, D.C., for a private two-hour unmoderated round table discussion. The event was videotaped and titled "The Four Horsemen". During "The God Debate" in 2010 with Hitchens versus Dinesh D'Souza, the group was collectively referred to as the "Four Horsemen of the Non-Apocalypse". All four were members of the Secular Coalition for America advisory board.

The book The Four Horsemen: The Conversation That Sparked an Atheist Revolution was released in 2019.

==== Sam Harris ====
Harris's 2004 book The End of Faith: Religion, Terror, and the Future of Reason, a bestseller, was joined over the next couple of years by a series of bestsellers by other atheist authors. Harris was motivated by the events of 11 September 2001, for which he blamed Islam, while also directly criticizing Christianity and Judaism. Two years later, Harris followed up with Letter to a Christian Nation, which was a severe criticism of Christianity. Later Harris wrote several non-fiction books including The Moral Landscape, and Waking Up, along with two shorter works (initially published as e-books), Free Will and Lying.

==== Richard Dawkins ====
Dawkins is the founder of the Richard Dawkins Foundation for Reason and Science. In 2006, following his television documentary series The Root of All Evil?, he published The God Delusion, a best seller. Dawkins writes in the introduction to the 10th anniversary edition of the book: "I don't object to the horseman label, by the way. I'm less keen on 'new atheist': it isn't clear to me how we differ from old atheists."

==== Christopher Hitchens ====
Hitchens, the author of God Is Not Great, was named among the "Top 100 Public Intellectuals" by Foreign Policy and Prospect magazines. In 2010, Hitchens published his memoir Hitch-22 (a nickname provided by close personal friend Salman Rushdie, whom Hitchens always supported during and following The Satanic Verses controversy). Shortly after its publication, he was diagnosed with esophageal cancer, which led to his death in December 2011. Before his death, Hitchens published a collection of essays and articles in his book Arguably; a short edition, Mortality, was published posthumously in 2012.

==== Daniel Dennett ====
Dennett was the author of Darwin's Dangerous Idea and Breaking the Spell. He participated in the creation of The Clergy Project, an organization that provides support for clergy in the US who no longer believe in God and cannot fully participate in their communities any longer. He was influential in the creation of the Brights movement, which promotes a naturalistic worldview (one that rejects the supernatural). He did research into clerics who are secretly atheists and how they rationalize their works. He found what he called a "don't ask, don't tell" conspiracy because believers did not want to hear of loss of faith. This made unbelieving preachers feel isolated, but they did not want to lose their jobs and church-supplied lodgings. Generally, they consoled themselves with the belief that they were doing good in their pastoral roles by providing comfort and required ritual. The research, with Linda LaScola, was further extended to include other denominations and non-Christian clerics. The research and stories Dennett and LaScola accumulated during this project were published in their 2013 co-authored book, Caught in the Pulpit: Leaving Belief Behind.

=== Ayaan Hirsi Ali ===
Hirsi Ali is a Somali-born Dutch-American writer, politician, and well-known critic of Islam. She was a central figure of New Atheism until she announced her conversion to Christianity in November 2023. Originally scheduled to attend the 2007 meeting, she later appeared with Dawkins, Dennett, and Harris at the 2012 Global Atheist Convention, where she was referred to as the "one horse-woman" by Dawkins. Robyn Blumner, CEO of the Center for Inquiry, has described Hirsi Ali as the fifth "horseman". Hirsi Ali has been vocal in opposing Islamic ideology, especially concerning women, as exemplified by her books The Caged Virgin, Infidel and Nomad.

=== Others ===
Others have either self-identified as or been classified by some commentators as new atheists:

- Dan Barker (b. 1949), author of Godless: How an Evangelical Preacher Became One of America's Leading Atheists
- Peter Boghossian (b. 1966), philosopher and author of A Manual for Creating Atheists
- Greta Christina (b. 1961), author of Why Are You Atheists So Angry?: 99 Things that Piss Off the Godless
- Jerry Coyne (b. 1949), author of Faith Versus Fact: Why Science and Religion Are Incompatible
- Rebecca Goldstein (b. 1950), philosopher and author of 36 Arguments for the Existence of God
- Michel Onfray (b. 1959), author of Atheist Manifesto: The Case Against Christianity, Judaism, and Islam
- Michael Schmidt-Salomon (b. 1967) author of Manifesto of Evolutionary Humanism and identified as Germany's "Chief Atheist"
- TJ Kirk (b. 1985), YouTube personality and podcast host known for his YouTube Channel Amazing Atheist
- Rebecca Watson (b. 1980), author of the blog Skepchick
- Victor J. Stenger (1935–2014), author of God: The Failed Hypothesis

Some writers sometimes classified as new atheists by others have explicitly distanced themselves from the label:

- A. C. Grayling (b. 1949), philosopher and author of The God Argument
- John W. Loftus (b. 1954), author of The Outsider Test For Faith
- P. Z. Myers (b. 1957), writer and biologist. Author of the blog Pharyngula

== Perspective ==
The scarlet A, symbol of Out Campaign

Many contemporary atheists write from a scientific perspective. Unlike previous writers, many of whom thought that science was indifferent or even incapable of dealing with the "God" concept, Dawkins argues to the contrary, claiming the "God Hypothesis" is a valid scientific hypothesis, having effects in the physical universe, and like any other hypothesis can be tested and falsified. Victor Stenger proposed that the personal Abrahamic God is a scientific hypothesis that can be tested by standard methods of science. Both Dawkins and Stenger conclude that the hypothesis fails any such tests, and argue that naturalism is sufficient to explain everything we observe. They argue that it is unnecessary to introduce God or the supernatural to understand reality.

=== Scientific testing of religion ===
Non-believers (in religion and the supernatural) assert that many religious or supernatural claims (such as the virgin birth of Jesus and the afterlife) are scientific claims in nature. For instance, they argue, as do deists and Progressive Christians, that the issue of Jesus' supposed parentage is a question of scientific inquiry, rather than values or morals. Proponents believe science is capable of investigating at least some, if not all, supernatural claims. Institutions such as the Mayo Clinic and Duke University have conducted empirical studies to try to identify whether there is evidence for the healing power of intercessory prayer. According to Stenger, the experiments found no evidence that intercessory prayer worked.

=== Logical arguments ===
In his book God: The Failed Hypothesis, Victor Stenger argues that a God having omniscient, omnibenevolent, and omnipotent attributes, which he termed a 3O God, cannot logically exist. A similar series of alleged logical disproofs of the existence of a God with various attributes can be found in Michael Martin and Ricki Monnier's The Impossibility of God, or Theodore Drange's article, "Incompatible-Properties Arguments: A Survey".

=== Views on non-overlapping magisteria ===
Richard Dawkins has been particularly critical of the conciliatory view that science and religion are not in conflict, noting, for example, that the Abrahamic religions constantly dabble in scientific matters. In a 1998 article published in Free Inquiry magazine, and later in his 2006 book The God Delusion, Dawkins expresses disagreement with the view advocated by Stephen Jay Gould that science and religion are two non-overlapping magisteria (NOMA), each existing in a "domain where one form of teaching holds the appropriate tools for meaningful discourse and resolution".

In Gould's proposal, science and religion should be confined to distinct non-overlapping domains: science would be limited to the empirical realm, including theories developed to describe observations, while religion would deal with questions of ultimate meaning and moral value. Dawkins contends that NOMA does not describe empirical facts about the intersection of science and religion. He argued: "It is completely unrealistic to claim, as Gould and many others do, that religion keeps itself away from science's turf, restricting itself to morals and values. A universe with a supernatural presence would be a fundamentally and qualitatively different kind of universe from one without. The difference is, inescapably, a scientific difference. Religions make existence claims, and this means scientific claims."

=== Science and morality ===
Harris considers that the well-being of conscious creatures forms the basis of morality. In The Moral Landscape, he argues that science can in principle answer moral questions and help maximize well-being. Harris also criticizes cultural and moral relativism, arguing that it prevents people from making objective moral judgments about practices that clearly harm human well-being, such as female genital mutilation. Harris contends that we can make scientifically-based claims about the negative impacts of such practices on human welfare, and that withholding judgment in these cases is tantamount to claiming complete ignorance about what contributes to human well-being.

=== Politics ===
In the context of international politics, the principles of New Atheism establish no particular stance in and of themselves. P. Z. Myers stated that New Atheism's key proponents are "a madly disorganized mob, united only by [their] dislike of the god-thing". That said, the demographic that supports New Atheism is a markedly homogeneous one; in America and the Anglo-sphere more generally, this cohort is "more likely to be younger, male and single, to have higher than average levels of income and education, to be less authoritarian, less dogmatic, less prejudiced, less conformist and more tolerant and open-minded on religious issues." Because of this homogeneity among the group, there exists not a formal dynamic but a loose consensus on broad political "efforts, objectives, and strategies".

For example, one of the primary aims is to further reduce the entanglement of church and state, which derives from the "belief that religion is antithetical to liberal values, such as freedom of expression and the separation of public from private life". Additionally, new atheists have engaged in the campaign "to ensure legal and civic equality for atheists", in a world considerably unwelcoming to and distrustful of non-religious believers. Hitchens may be the atheist concerned most with religion's incompatibility with contemporary liberal principles, and particularly its imposed limitation on both freedom of speech and freedom of expression. Because New Atheism's proliferation is accredited partly to the 11 September attacks and the ubiquitous, visceral response, Richard Dawkins, among many in his cohort, believes that theism (in this case, Islam) jeopardizes political institutions and national security, and he warns of religion's potency in motivating "people to do terrible things" against international polities.

== Criticism ==
According to Humanities and Social Sciences Communications, "Critics of new atheism, as well as many new atheists themselves, contend that in philosophical terms it differs little from earlier historical forms of atheist thought."

=== General criticism and scientism ===
Critics of the movement described it as "militant atheism", "fundamentalist atheism", and "secular fundamentalists". (Note: The term is sometimes used benignly, for example by atheists such as Frans de Waal.) Theologians Jeffrey Robbins and Christopher Rodkey take issue with what they regard as "the evangelical nature of the New Atheism, which assumes that it has a Good News to share, at all cost, for the ultimate future of humanity by the conversion of as many people as possible", and believe they have found similarities between New Atheism and evangelical Christianity and conclude that the all-consuming nature of both "encourages endless conflict without progress" between both extremities. Amarnath Amarasingam, an extremism researcher, argues that the New Atheists fall prey to cognitive biases such as the fundamental attribution error and the out-group homogeneity bias, among others. These biases pose a substantive problem for New Atheism’s claims to rationality and objectivity. Political philosopher John Gray asserts that New Atheism, humanism, and scientism are extensions of religion, particularly Christianity. Anthropologist and psychiatrist Simon Dein considers New Atheism to be a mirror image of religious fundamentalism, based on an analysis of characteristics identified by the Fundamentalism Project: reactivity, dualism, absolutism and inerrancy, and apocalypticism. In addition, he also notes a shared emphasis on evidentialism. Sociologist William Stahl has said, "What is striking about the current debate is the frequency with which the New Atheists are portrayed as mirror images of religious fundamentalists."

The philosopher of science Michael Ruse states that Richard Dawkins would fail "introductory" courses on the study of "philosophy or religion" (such as courses on the philosophy of religion), courses which are offered, for example, at many educational institutions such as colleges and universities around the world. Ruse also says that the movement of New Atheism—which is perceived by him to be "a bloody disaster"—makes him ashamed, as a professional philosopher of science, to be among those holding to an atheist position, particularly as New Atheism, as he sees it, does science a "grave disservice" and does a "disservice to scholarship" at a more general level. Paul Kurtz, editor in chief of Free Inquiry, founder of Prometheus Books, was critical of many of the new atheists. He said, "I consider them atheist fundamentalists... They're anti-religious, and they're mean-spirited, unfortunately. Now, there are very good atheists and very dedicated people who do not believe in God. But you have this aggressive and militant phase of atheism, and that does more damage than good." Rabbi Jonathan Sacks, author of The Great Partnership: Science, Religion, and the Search for Meaning, feels the new atheists miss the target by believing the "cure for bad religion is no religion, as opposed to good religion". He wrote:

Atheism deserves better than the new atheists whose methodology consists of criticizing religion without understanding it, quoting texts without contexts, taking exceptions as the rule, confusing folk belief with reflective theology, abusing, mocking, ridiculing, caricaturing, and demonizing religious faith and holding it responsible for the great crimes against humanity. Religion has done harm; I acknowledge that. But the cure for bad religion is good religion, not no religion, just as the cure for bad science is good science, not the abandonment of science.

The philosopher Massimo Pigliucci contends that the new atheist movement overlaps with scientism, which he finds to be philosophically unsound. He writes: "What I do object to is the tendency, found among many New Atheists, to expand the definition of science to pretty much encompassing anything that deals with 'facts', loosely conceived ... it seems clear to me that most of the New Atheists (except for the professional philosophers among them) pontificate about philosophy very likely without having read a single professional paper in that field ... I would actually go so far as to charge many of the leaders of the New Atheism movement (and, by implication, a good number of their followers) with anti-intellectualism, one mark of which is a lack of respect for the proper significance, value, and methods of another field of intellectual endeavor."

In The Evolution of Atheism, Stephen LeDrew wrote that New Atheism is fundamentalist and scientist; in contrast to atheism's tradition of social justice, it is right-wing and serves to defend "the position of the white middle-class western male". Professor Jacques Berlinerblau has criticised the new atheists' mocking of religion as being inimical to their goals and claims that they have not achieved anything politically. Roger Scruton has extensively criticized New Atheism on various occasions, generally on the grounds that they do not consider the social effects and impacts of religion in enough detail. He has said, "Look at the facts in the round and it seems likely that humans without a sense of the sacred would have died out long ago. For that same reason, the hope of the new atheists for a world without religion is probably as vain as the hope for a society without aggression or a world without death." He has also complained of the new atheists' idea that they must "set people free from religion", calling it "naive" because they "never consider that they might be taking something away from people".

Edward Feser has critiqued the new atheists' responses to arguments for the existence of God:

It can safely be said that if you haven't both understood Aquinas and answered him – not to mention Anselm, Duns Scotus, Leibniz, Samuel Clarke, and so on, but let that pass – then you have hardly "made your case" against religion. Yet Dawkins is the only "New Atheist" to offer anything even remotely like an attempt to answer him, feeble as it is.

— Edward Feser, The Last Superstition (2008)

=== Sexism ===
There have been criticisms of such movements perpetuating patriarchal beliefs and practices such as sexism, despite internal claims of gender equality. This has contributed to female atheists feeling shut out, trivialized, and silenced. The New Atheist movement was accused of sexism after "Elevatorgate", a controversy surrounding atheist blogger Rebecca Watson's criticism of unwanted sexual advances in the atheist community. In 2014, Sam Harris said that New Atheism was "to some degree intrinsically male".

=== Islamophobia ===
Some commentators have accused the New Atheist movement of Islamophobia. Wade Jacoby and Hakan Yavuz assert that "a group of 'new atheists' such as Richard Dawkins, Sam Harris, and Christopher Hitchens" have "invoked Samuel Huntington's 'clash of civilizations' theory to explain the current political contestation" and that this forms part of a trend toward "Islamophobia ... in the study of Muslim societies". William W. Emilson argues that "the 'new' in the new atheists' writings is not their aggressiveness, nor their extraordinary popularity, nor even their scientific approach to religion, rather it is their attack not only on militant Islamism but also on Islam itself under the cloak of its general critique of religion."

=== Far-right politics ===
In 2019, Steven Poole of The Guardian claimed: "For some, New Atheism was never about God at all, but just a topical subgenre of the rightwing backlash against the supposedly suffocating atmosphere of 'political correctness'." The same year, Scott Alexander, a blogger in the ideologically similar rationalist community, countered that New Atheism declined because it "seamlessly merged into the modern social justice movement", with many former New Atheists becoming more interested in fighting sexism, racism, and homophobia under the label "atheism-plus", leaving only right-wing atheists remaining in the original movement. In a June 2021 retrospective article, Émile P. Torres of Salon argued that prominent figures in the New Atheist movement had aligned themselves with the far-right.

== Reception and legacy ==
Tom Flynn, editor of Free Inquiry, wrote that the only "new" thing about New Atheism was the wider publication of atheist material by big-name publishers, books that appeared on bestseller lists and were read by millions. In November 2015, The New Republic published an article entitled "Is the New Atheism dead?" In 2016, evolutionary biologist David Sloan Wilson wrote: "The world appears to be tiring of the New Atheism movement." In 2017, PZ Myers, who formerly considered himself a new atheist, publicly renounced the New Atheism movement.

In a June 2022 retrospective article, Sebastian Milbank of The Critic stated that, as a movement, "New Atheism has fractured and lost its original spirit", that "much of what New Atheism embodied has now migrated rightwards", and that "another portion has moved leftwards, embodied by the 'I Fucking Love Science' woke nerd of today." Following the conversion of writer Ayaan Hirsi Ali to Christianity in 2023, the columnist Sarah Jones wrote in New York magazine that the New Atheism movement was in "terminal decline".

== See also ==
- A Brief History of Disbelief – 3-part PBS series (2007)
- Atheist Delusions: The Christian Revolution and Its Fashionable Enemies
- Antireligion
- Atheist feminism
- Brights movement
- Conflict thesis
- Critical thinking
- Criticism of religion
- Freedom From Religion Foundation
- Freethought
- History of atheism
- Metaphysical naturalism
- Materialism
- Parody religion
- Public awareness of science
- Rationalist community
- Relationship between religion and science
- Secular movement
