= Secular morality =

Aspect of philosophy

Secular morality is the aspect of philosophy that deals with morality outside of religious traditions. Modern examples include humanism, freethinking, and most versions of consequentialism. Additional philosophies with ancient roots include those such as skepticism and virtue ethics. Greg M. Epstein also states that, "much of ancient Far Eastern thought is deeply concerned with human goodness without placing much if any stock in the importance of gods or spirits." An example is the Kural text of Valluvar, an ancient Indian theistic poet-philosopher whose work remains secular and non-denominational. Other philosophers have proposed various ideas about how to determine right and wrong actions. An example is Immanuel Kant's categorical imperative.

A variety of positions are apparent regarding the relationship between religion and morality. Some believe that religion is necessary as a guide to a moral life. According to some, this idea has been with us for nearly 2,000 years. Others suggest this idea goes back at least 2,600 years as exemplified in Psalm 14 of the Hebrew Bible. According to others, the idea goes back as far as 4,000 years, with the ancient Egyptians' 42 Principles of Ma'at.

Others eschew the idea that religion is required to provide a guide to right and wrong behavior. The Westminster Dictionary of Christian Ethics however states that religion and morality "are to be defined differently and have no definitional connections with each other". Some believe that religions provide poor guides to moral behavior. Various commentators, such as Richard Dawkins (The God Delusion), Sam Harris (The End of Faith) and Christopher Hitchens (God Is Not Great) are among those who have asserted this view.

== Secular moral frameworks ==
=== Consequentialism ===
"Consequentialists", as described by Peter Singer, "start not with moral rules, but with goals. They assess actions by the extent to which they further those goals." Singer also notes that utilitarianism is "the best-known, though not the only, consequentialist theory." Epicureanism offers a pleasure-based consequential theory of ethics, and its founder says "we think empirically concerning the actions based on the results observed from any course of action." Consequentialism is the class of normative ethical theories holding that the consequences of one's conduct are the ultimate basis for any judgment about the rightness of that conduct. Thus, from a consequentialist standpoint, a morally right act (or omission) is one that will produce a good outcome, or consequence. In his 2010 book, The Moral Landscape, Sam Harris describes a utilitarian science of morality.

=== Freethought ===
Freethought is a philosophical viewpoint that holds that opinions should be formed on the basis of science, logic, and reason, and should not be influenced by authority, tradition, or other dogmas. Freethinkers strive to build their opinions on the basis of facts, scientific inquiry, and logical principles, independent of any logical fallacies or intellectually limiting effects of authority, confirmation bias, cognitive bias, conventional wisdom, popular culture, prejudice, sectarianism, tradition, urban legend, and all other dogmas.

=== Secular humanism ===
Secular humanism focuses on the way human beings can lead happy and functional lives. It posits that human beings are capable of being ethical and moral without religion or God, it neither assumes humans to be inherently evil or innately good, nor presents humans as "above nature" or superior to it. Rather, the humanist life stance emphasizes the unique responsibility facing humanity and the ethical consequences of human decisions. Fundamental to the concept of secular humanism is the strongly held viewpoint that ideology—be it religious or political—must be thoroughly examined by each individual and not simply accepted or rejected on faith. Along with this, an essential part of secular humanism is a continually adapting search for truth, primarily through science and philosophy.

== Positions on religion and morality ==
The subject of secular morality has been discussed by prominent secular scholars as well as popular culture-based atheist and anti-religious writers. These include Paul Chamberlain's Can We Be Good Without God? (1996), Richard Holloway's Godless Morality: Keeping Religion Out of Ethics (1999), Robert Buckman's Can We Be Good Without God? (2002), Michael Shermer's The Science of Good and Evil (2004), Richard Dawkins's The God Delusion (2006), Christopher Hitchens's God Is Not Great (2007), Greg Epstein's Good Without God: What A Billion Nonreligious People Do Believe (2010), and Sam Harris's The Moral Landscape: How Science Can Determine Human Values (2011).

=== "Morality does not require religious tenets" ===
According to Greg Epstein, "the idea that we can't be 'good without God'" has been with us for nearly 2,000 years. Others suggest this idea goes back further; for example in Psalm 14 of the Hebrew Bible which according to Hermann Gunkel date to the exile period of approximately 580 BCE. It states, "The fool says in his heart, 'there is no God.' They are corrupt, they do abominable deeds, there is none who does good ... not even one."

Friedrich Nietzsche famously declared God is Dead but also warned "When one gives up the Christian faith, one pulls the right to Christian morality out from under one's feet. This morality is by no means self-evident ... Christianity is a system, a whole view of things thought out together. By breaking one main concept out of it, the faith in God, one breaks the whole."

This idea is still present today. "Many today ... argue that religious beliefs are necessary to provide moral guidance and standards of virtuous conduct in an otherwise corrupt, materialistic, and degenerate world." For example, Christian writer and medievalist C. S. Lewis made the argument in his popular book Mere Christianity that if a supernatural, objective standard of right and wrong does not exist outside of the natural world, then right and wrong becomes mired in the is-ought problem. Thus, he wrote, preferences for one moral standard over another become as inherently indefensible and arbitrary as preferring a certain flavor of food over another or choosing to drive on a certain side of a road. In the same vein, Christian theologian Ron Rhodes has remarked that "it is impossible to distinguish evil from good unless one has an infinite reference point which is absolutely good." Peter Singer states that, "Traditionally, the more important link between religion and ethics was that religion was thought to provide a reason for doing what is right, the reason being that those who are virtuous will be rewarded by an eternity of bliss while the rest roast in hell."

Proponents of theism argue that without a God or gods it is impossible to justify moral behavior on metaphysical grounds and thus to make a coherent case for abiding by moral standards. C. S. Lewis makes such an argument in Mere Christianity. Peter Robinson, a political author and commentator with Stanford's Hoover Institution, has commented that, if an inner moral conscience is just another adaptive or evolved feeling in the human mind like simple emotional urges, then no inherent reason exists to consider morality as over and above other urges. According to Thomas Dixon, "Religions certainly do provide a framework within which people can learn the difference between right and wrong."

=== "Morality does not rely on religion" ===
"A man's ethical behavior should be based effectually on sympathy, education, and social ties and needs; no religious basis is necessary. Man would indeed be in a poor way if he had to be restrained by fear of punishment and hopes of reward after death."

— Albert Einstein, "Religion and Science," New York Times Magazine, 1930

Various commentators have stated that morality does not require religion as a guide. The Westminster Dictionary of Christian Ethics states that, "it is not hard to imagine a society of people that has no religion but has a morality, as well as a legal system, just because it says that people cannot live together without rules against killing, etc., and that it is not desirable for these all to be legally enforced. There have also certainly been people who have had a morality but no religious beliefs." Bernard Williams, an English philosopher, stated that the secular "utilitarian outlook"—a popular ethical position wherein the morally right action is defined as that action which effects the greatest amount of happiness or pleasure for the greatest number of people—is "non-transcendental, and makes no appeal outside human life, in particular not to religious considerations." Williams also argued that, "Either one's motives for following the moral word of God are moral motives, or they are not. If they are, then one is already equipped with moral motivations, and the introduction of God adds nothing extra. But if they are not moral motives, then they will be motives of such a kind that they cannot appropriately motivate morality at all ... we reach the conclusion that any appeal to God in this connection either adds to nothing at all, or it adds the wrong sort of thing."

Socrates' "Euthyphro dilemma" is often considered one of the earliest refutations of the idea that morality requires religion. This line of reasoning is described by Peter Singer:

"Some theists say that ethics cannot do without religion because the very meaning of 'good' is nothing other than 'what God approves'. Plato refuted a similar claim more than two thousand years ago by arguing that if the gods approve of some actions it must be because those actions are good, in which case it cannot be the gods' approval that makes them good. The alternative view makes divine approval entirely arbitrary: if the gods had happened to approve of torture and disapprove of helping our neighbors, torture would have been good and helping our neighbors bad. Some modern theists have attempted to extricate themselves from this type of dilemma by maintaining that God is good and so could not possibly approve of torture; but these theists are caught in a trap of their own making, for what can they possibly mean by the assertion that God is good? That God is approved of by God?"

Greg Epstein, a Humanist chaplain at Harvard University, dismisses the question of whether God is needed to be good "because that question does not need to be answered—it needs to be rejected outright," adding, "To suggest that one can't be good without belief in God is not just an opinion ... it is a prejudice. It may even be discrimination." This is in line with the Westminster Dictionary of Christian Ethics which states that religion and morality "are to be defined differently and have no definitional connections with each other. Conceptually and in principle, morality and a religious value system are two distinct kinds of value systems or action guides." Others share this view. Singer states that morality "is not something intelligible only in the context of religion". (Note: Singer uses the word "ethics", but states in the same work that he uses the words ethics and morals "interchangeably" (p. 1).) Atheistic philosopher Julian Baggini stated that "there is nothing to stop atheists believing in morality, a meaning for life, or human goodness. Atheism is only intrinsically negative when it comes to belief about God. It is as capable of a positive view of other aspects of life as any other belief." He also states that "Morality is more than possible without God, it is entirely independent of him. That means atheists are not only more than capable of leading moral lives, they may even be able to lead more moral lives than religious believers who confuse divine law and punishment with right and wrong.

Popular atheist author and Vanity Fair writer Christopher Hitchens remarked on the program Uncommon Knowledge:

"I think our knowledge of right and wrong is innate in us. Religion gets its morality from humans. We know that we can't get along if we permit perjury, theft, murder, rape, all societies at all times, well before the advent of monarchies and certainly, have forbidden it... Socrates called his daemon, it was an inner voice that stopped him when he was trying to take advantage of someone... Why don't we just assume that we do have some internal compass?"

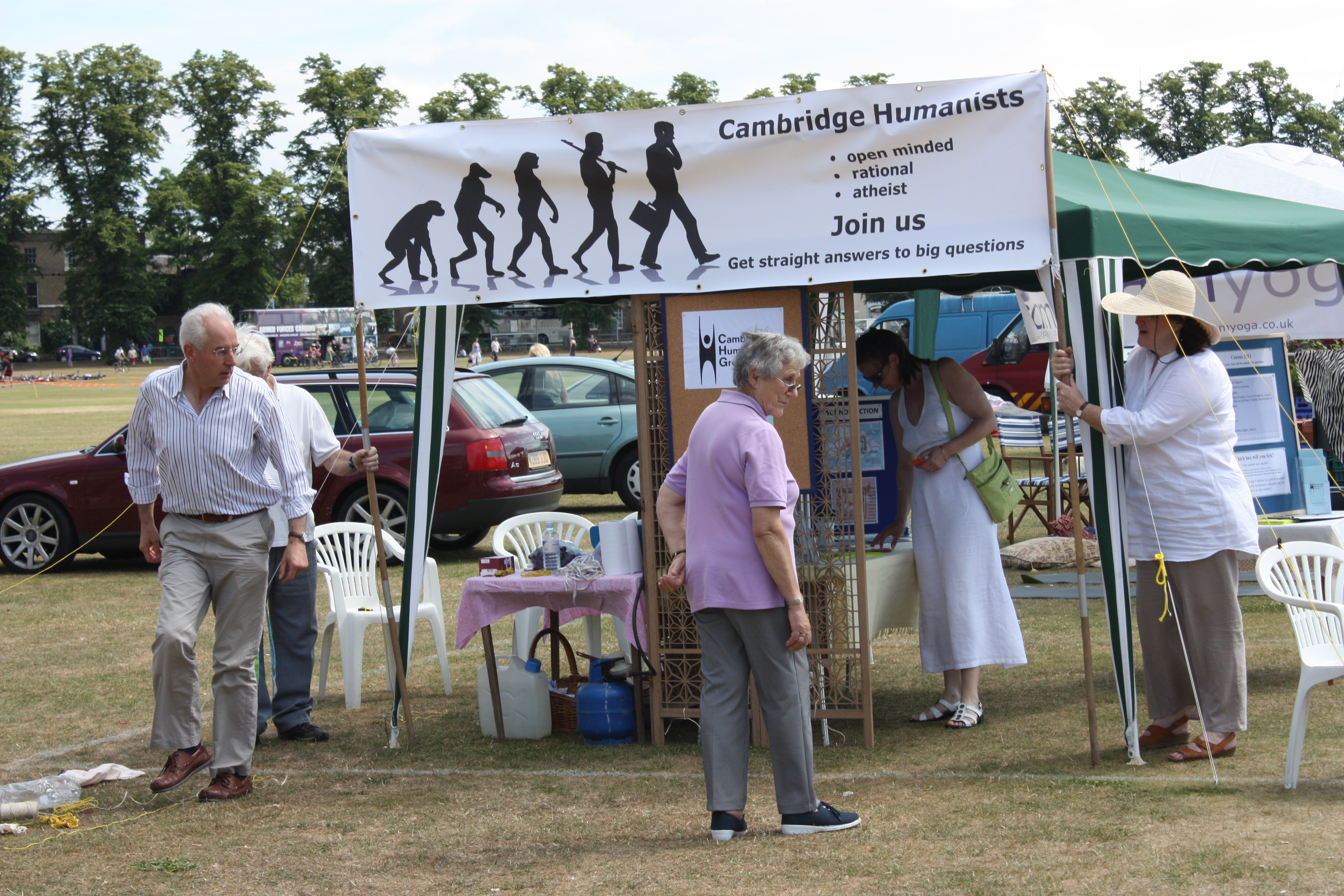
Daniel Dennett says it is a "pernicious" myth that religion or God are needed for people to fulfill their desires to be good. However, he offers that secular and humanist groups are still learning how to organize effectively.

Philosopher Daniel Dennett says that secular organizations need to learn more 'marketing' lessons from religion—and from effective secular organizations like the TED conferences. This is partly because Dennett says that the idea that people need God to be morally good is an extremely harmful, yet popular myth. He believes it is a falsehood that persists because churches are currently much better at organizing people to do morally good work. In Dennett's words:

"What is particularly pernicious about it [the myth] is that it exploits a wonderful human trait; people want to be good. They want to lead good lives... So then along come religions that say 'Well you can't be good without God' to convince people that they have to do this. That may be the main motivation for people to take religions seriously—to try to take religions seriously, to try and establish an allegiance to the church—because they want to lead good lives."

=== "Religion is a poor moral guide" ===
Popular atheist author and biologist Richard Dawkins, writing in The God Delusion, has stated that religious people have committed a wide variety of acts and held certain beliefs through history that are considered today to be morally repugnant. He has stated that Adolf Hitler and the Nazis held broadly Christian religious beliefs that inspired the Holocaust on account of antisemitic Christian doctrine, that Christians have traditionally imposed unfair restrictions on the legal and civil rights of women, and that Christians have condoned slavery of some form or description throughout most of Christianity's history. Dawkins insists that, since Jewish and Christian interpretations of the Bible have changed over the span of history so that what was formerly seen as permissible is now seen as impermissible, it is intellectually dishonest for them to believe theism provides an absolute moral foundation apart from secular intuition. In addition, he argued that since Christians and other religious groups do not acknowledge the binding authority of all parts of their holy texts (e.g., the books of Exodus and Leviticus state that those who work on the Sabbath and those caught performing acts of homosexuality, respectively, were to be put to death), they are already capable of distinguishing "right" from "wrong".

The Humanist Rabbi Greg M. Epstein notes a theme similar to that in Dostoyevsky's novel The Brothers Karamazov: Greg notes, "If you're going to do something naughty, you're going to do it, and all the theology in the world isn't going to stop you." For instance the apologies by Christians who have "sinned" (such as Bill Clinton and Jimmy Swaggart) "must embolden some who take enormous risks for the thrill of a little immoral behavior: their Lord will forgive them, if they only ask nicely enough when—or if—they are eventually caught." In the novel, the well-known paraphrased passage being, "If God is dead, all is permitted." In the novel, the character Ivan's internal conflict shows that that dictum is in and of itself a paradoxical moral justification:

"[...] 'all things are lawful' and that's the end of it! That's all very charming; but if you want to swindle why do you want a moral sanction for doing it? But that's our modern Russian all over. He can't bring himself to swindle without a moral sanction. He is so in love with truth—"

Some surveys and sociological literature suggest that theists do no better than their secular counterparts in the percentage adhering to widely held moral standards (e.g., lying, theft and sexual infidelity). (Note: See, for instance, Ronald J. Sider, The Scandal of the Evangelical Conscience: Why Are Christians Living Just Like the Rest of the World? (Grand Rapids, Mich.: Baker, 2005). Sider quotes extensively from polling research by The Barna Group showing that the moral behavior of evangelical Christians is anything but exemplary.)

=== Other views ===
Some non-religious nihilistic and existentialist thinkers have affirmed the prominent theistic position that the existence of the personal God of theism is linked to the existence of an objective moral standard, asserting that questions of right and wrong inherently have no meaning and, thus, any notions of morality are nothing but an anthropogenic fantasy. Agnostic author and Absurdist philosopher Albert Camus discussed the issue of what he saw as the universe's indifference towards humankind and the meaninglessness of life in his prominent novel The Stranger, in which the protagonist accepts death via execution without sadness or feelings of injustice. In his philosophical work, The Myth of Sisyphus, Camus argues that human beings must choose to live defiantly in spite of their longing for purpose or direction and the apparent lack of evidence for God or moral imperatives. The atheistic existentialist philosopher Jean-Paul Sartre proposed that the individual must create his own essence and therefore must freely and independently create his own subjective moral standards by which to live.

Gaudiya Vaishnavism philosopher Bhaktivinoda Thakura says in his book, Tattva Viveka (translated from Bengali by Kusakratha das):

"How the preacher of the philosophy of unselfish material pleasure induces his followers to act morally in the world is not easily understood. Pushed by their own selfish desires, people may act morally for some time, but when they think it over, they will eventually sin. They will say to themselves: 'O my brother, don't stay away from sense pleasures. Enjoy sense pleasures as you like, as long as others do not know of them. Why not? I do not think the world will collapse because of them. There is no God, an all-seeing God who gives to us the results of our actions. What have you to fear? Just be a little careful, so no one will know. If they learn of it, then you will lose your good reputation, and perhaps the government or bad people will make trouble for you. If that happens neither you nor others will be happy.' Know for certain that if the hearts of the preachers of atheistic morality were examined, these thoughts would be found."

== Evidential findings ==
Cases can be seen in nature of animals exhibiting behavior that might classify as "moral" without religious directives to guide them. These include "detailed studies of the complex systems of altruism and cooperation that operate among social insects" and "the posting of altruistic sentinels by some species of bird and mammal, who risk their own lives to warn the rest of the group of imminent danger."

Greg Epstein states that "sociologists have recently begun to pay more attention to the fact that some of the world's most secular countries, such as those in Scandinavia, are among the least violent, best educated, and most likely to care for the poor". He adds that, "scientists are beginning to document, though religion may have benefits for the brain, so may secularism and Humanism."

In April 2012, the results of a study which tested their subjects' pro-social sentiments were published in the Social Psychological and Personality Science journal in which non-religious people had higher scores showing that they were more inclined to show generosity in random acts of kindness, such as lending their possessions and offering a seat on a crowded bus or train. Religious people also had lower scores when it came to seeing how much compassion motivated participants to be charitable in other ways, such as in giving money or food to a homeless person and to non-believers. But, global research done by Gallup between 2006 and 2008 on people from 145 countries give the opposite results. According to research, adherents of all the major world religions who attended religious services in the past week got higher rates of generosity such as donating money, volunteering, and helping a stranger than do their coreligionists who did not attend services (non-attenders). For the people who were nonreligious, but said that they attended religious services in the past week exhibited more generous behaviors than those who did not. Another global study by Gallup showed that highly religious people are more likely to help others in terms of donating money, volunteering, and helping strangers despite having, on average, lower incomes than those who are less religious or nonreligious who reported higher incomes. In the research, it is said that these helping behaviors cannot be conclusively attributed to the direct influence of religiosity, but that it is intuitive that religious people are more likely to engage in helping behaviors because of values promoted by religions such as selflessness and generosity.

A number of studies have been conducted on the empirics of morality in various countries, and the overall relationship between faith and crime is unclear. (Note: Some studies appear to show positive links in the relationship between religiosity and moral behavior—for example, surveys suggesting a positive connection between faith and altruism. Modern research in criminology also suggests an inverse relationship between religion and crime, with some studies establishing this connection. A meta-analysis of 60 studies on religion and crime concluded, "religious behaviors and beliefs exert a moderate deterrent effect on individuals' criminal behavior".) A 2001 review of studies on this topic found "The existing evidence surrounding the effect of religion on crime is varied, contested, and inconclusive, and currently no persuasive answer exists as to the empirical relationship between religion and crime." Phil Zuckerman's 2008 book, Society without God, notes that Denmark and Sweden, "which are probably the least religious countries in the world, and possibly in the history of the world", enjoy "among the lowest violent crime rates in the world [and] the lowest levels of corruption in the world". (Note: Zuckerman identifies that Scandinavians have "relatively high rates of petty crime and burglary", but "their overall rates of violent crime—such as murder, aggravated assault, and rape—are among the lowest on earth" (Zuckerman 2008, pp. 5–6).) Dozens of studies have been conducted on this topic since the twentieth century. A 2005 study by Gregory S. Paul published in the Journal of Religion and Society stated that, "In general, higher rates of belief in and worship of a creator correlate with higher rates of homicide, juvenile and early adult mortality, STD infection rates, teen pregnancy, and abortion in the prosperous democracies," and "In all secular developing democracies a centuries long-term trend has seen homicide rates drop to historical lows" with the exceptions being the United States (with a high religiosity level) and "theistic" Portugal. (Note: The authors also state that "A few hundred years ago rates of homicide were astronomical in Christian Europe and the American colonies," and "[t]he least theistic secular developing democracies such as Japan, France, and Scandinavia have been most successful in these regards." They argue for a positive correlation between the degree of public religiosity in a society and certain measures of dysfunction, an analysis published later in the same journal argues that a number of methodological problems undermine any findings or conclusions in the research.) In a response, Gary Jensen builds on and refines Paul's study. His conclusion is that a "complex relationship" exists between religiosity and homicide "with some dimensions of religiosity encouraging homicide and other dimensions discouraging it".

== See also ==
- Morality and religion
- Secular ethics
- Science of morality
