= Moral Landscape =

Moral Landscape may refer to:

- In the Science of morality, the peaks and troughs of various ethical systems in maximizing the flourishing of conscious creatures
- The Moral Landscape, a 2010 non-fiction book written by Sam Harris
