= Grigory Gurev =

Soviet philosopher (1891-1987)

Grigory Abramovich Gurev (Russian: Григорий Абрамович Гурев; 1891–1978) was a Soviet philosopher, popularizer of anti-religious knowledge, the author of several books on the history of religion and atheism.

Major works: "The Great Conflict" (1965), "The Story of a Single Misconception" (1970), "Charles Darwin and Atheism" (1975).

== Books ==
In Russian

- Как религия боролась с наукой (How Religion Struggled with Science). – [Москва]: акц. о-во "Безбожник", [19--] (тип. изд-ва "Крестьянская газета"). – [3] с.;
- Наука и религия о вселенной (Science and Religion of the Universe): Науч.-попул. очерк. – [Москва]: Изд. и ф-ка юношеской книги изд-ва "Мол. гвардия", 1938. – 103 с.: ил.;
- Земля и небо (Earth and Sky): [Очерки по истории астрономии]: [Для ст. возраста]. – Москва; Ленинград: Детиздат, 1939 (Москва). – 136 с.: ил.;
  - Земля и небо (Earth and Sky): [Очерки по истории астрономии]. – Москва; Ленинград: Детиздат, 1940 (Москва). – 152 с.: ил. и черт.; 20 см. – (Школьная библиотека. Для неполной средней и средней школы).
- Откуда пошел род человеческий (Where did the Human Race Come from). – Москва: ГАИЗ, 1940. – 80 с., 5 вкл. л. ил. и портр.: ил. и портр.
- Астрология и религия (Astrology and Religion): История одного заблуждения. – Москва: ГАИЗ, 1940. – 132 с., 1 вкл. л. ил.: ил. и черт.;
- Марксизм-ленинизм о происхождении религии (Marxism–Leninism on the Origin of Religion). – Москва: Знание, 1953. – 32 с.; 22 см. – (Всесоюзное общество по распространению политических и научных знаний. Серия 2; No. 6).
- О вере в бога (On Faith in God): Беседы с верующими и неверующими. – Москва: Госполитиздат, 1954. – 84 с.;
  - О вере в бога (On Faith in God): [Школьникам об атеизме]. – 2-е изд., перераб. и доп. – Москва: Учпедгиз, 1961. – 104 с.; 20 см.
- Научные предвидения и религиозные предрассудки (Scientific Foresight and Religious Prejudices). – Москва: Воениздат, 1955. – 88 с.;
  - Научные предвидения и религиозные предрассудки (Scientific Foresight and Religious Prejudices). – 2-е изд., доп. – Москва: Воениздат, 1958. – 125 с.; 20 см. – (Научно-популярная б-ка).
- Как произошел человеческий род (How did the Human Race Come from). – Москва: Моск. рабочий, 1955. – 104 с.: ил.
- Что такое Вселенная (What is the Universe). – 2-е изд., перераб. – Москва: Гостехиздат, 1955. – 200 с.: ил.;
- Наука и религия о строении Вселенной (Science and Religion about the Structure of the Universe). – [Москва]: Мол. гвардия, 1955. – 64 с.;
  - Что такое Вселенная (What is the Universe). – 3-е изд., стер. – Москва: Гостехиздат, 1957. – 200 с.: ил.;
- О вере в бессмертие души (On Faith in the Immortality of the Soul). – Москва: Госполитиздат, 1957. – 52 с.;
- О смысле жизни (On the Meaning of Life): (Критика религиозных представлений). – Москва: [б. и.], 1958. – 39 с.;
- Сотворена ли Вселенная? (Is the Universe Created?). – Москва: Знание, 1957. – 32 с.; 22 см. – (Серия 11/ Всесоюз. о-во по распространению полит. и науч. знаний; No. 9).
  - Сотворена ли Вселенная? (Is the Universe Created?) – Москва: Сов. Россия, 1963. – 59 с.; 14 см. – (Отвечаем на вопросы верующих).

In Bulgarian

- Развитие на човешкия род / Г. А. Гурев; Превел от руски Марко Марчевски. – 2-ро изд. – София: Нариздат, 1945. – 76 с.: ил.;
- Сътворена ли е вселената? / Г. А. Гурев; Прев. от рус. Катя Койчева. – [София]: Профиздат, 1960. – 70 с.; 15 см. – (Научно-атеистични знания; No. 8. 1960).
- Дарвинизъм и религия: Из историята на идеологичната борба в биологията / Г. А. Гурев; Прев. от рус. Екатерина Пеева. – София: Наука и изкуство, 1959. – 233 с.;
- За вярата в безсмъртие на душата / Г. А. Гурев; Прев. от рус. Л. Цветаров. – София: Изд-во на Нац. съвет на Отечеств. фронт, 1960. – 48 с.; 22 см. – (Библиотека политически и научни знания; 10).
- Учението на Коперник и религията [Текст] / Прев. от рус. Драгомир Николаев. – София: Изд-во на Бълг. ком. партия, 1967. – 195 с.;
- За вярата в бога: Беседи с вярващи и невярващи / Г. А. Гурев; Прев. от рус. език Мария Шарланджиева. – София: Народна младеж, 1955. – 72 с.;

In German

- Wie der Darwinismus von den malthusianistischen Fehlern befreit wurde: Stenogramm eines öffentlichen Vortrages der Unionsgesellschaft zur Verbreitung politischer und wissenschaftlicher Kenntnisse in Moskau / Von G. A. Gurew. – Berlin: Aufbau-Verl., 1953. – 44 с.; 19 см. – (Kulturbund zur demokratischen Erneuerung Deutschlands. Vorträge zur Verbreitung wissenschaftlicher Kenntnisse; 40).
- Über den Glauben an Gott: Gespräche mit Gläubigen und Nichtgläubigen: Übers. nach dem russisch. Orig. / G. A. Gurew. – Bukarest: Politischer Verl., 1958. – 110 с.;

In Greek

- Τό σύμπαν / Γ. Α. Γκοῦριεφ. – [Б. м.]: Νέα Ἑλλάδα, 1951. – 62 с.: ил.; 16 см. – (Ἐκλαϊκευτική βιβλιοθήκη; 3)

In Romanian

- Despre credinţa în dumnezeu: De vorba cu credincioşi şi necredincioşi: [Trad. din limba rusă] / G. A. Gurev. – București: Ed. de stat pentru literatură politică, 1956. – 90 p.;

In Hungarian

- Az istenhitről / G. A. Gurjev; Ford. Auer Kálmán. – Budapest: Szikra, 1955. – 79 с.;
- Tudományos előrelátás és vallásos jóslatok; A tudomány és a vallás a világmindenség szerkezetéről / G. A. Gurev; Ford. Moor Albert és Sártói Ambrus. – Budapest: Művelt nép, 1952. – 62 с.;

In Polish

- O wierze w boga: Pogadanki z wierzącymi i niewierzącymi / G. A. Guriew; Przeł. J. Docenko. – Wilnius: Państw. wyd-wo literatury politycznej i naukowej, 1955. – 85 с.;
- Co to jest wszechświat / G. Guriew; Przekł. z wyd. 2-go, przerobionego I. Tarasiejski. – Wilnius: Państ. wyd. literatury polit. i naukowej, 1956. – 226 s.: il.;
- Nauka i religia o budowie wszechświata: Stenogram odczytu publicznego ... / G. Guriew; Przełożył J. Zaborowski; Wszechzwiązkowe t-wo krzewienia wiedzy politycznej i naukowej. – Wilnius: Państwowe wyd-wo literatury politycznej i naukowej, 1951. – 35 с.;

In Slovak

- Vedecké predvídania a náboženské proroctvá / G. A. Gurev; Prel. Ján Štefánik. – Martin: Osveta, 1953. – 26 с.;
