= The Evolution of Atheism =

2015 book by Stephen LeDrew

The Evolution of Atheism: The Politics of a Modern Movement
- Author: Stephen LeDrew
- Language: English
- Subject: New Atheism and modern atheism
- Publisher: Oxford University Press
- Publication date: 2 November 2015
- Pages: 288
- ISBN: 9780190225179

The Evolution of Atheism: The Politics of a Modern Movement is a 2015 book by Stephen LeDrew, adapted from his PhD dissertation. Though an atheist, LeDrew criticises the movement of New Atheism, which arose in the 2000s with the "Four Horsemen" Richard Dawkins, Daniel Dennett, Sam Harris and Christopher Hitchens as prominent figures.

According to LeDrew, modern atheism can be "scientific", "humanist" or "libertarian". He aims to describe how New Atheism, which he characterizes as a right-wing branch of scientific atheism, arose in popularity and how it contrasts with other atheist views, particularly those who oppose religion in order to achieve social justice.

The book was praised for adding to the scholarship of New Atheism and including original interviews with New Atheist laypeople. Some reviewers criticised LeDrew's choice of categories to divide modern atheism into or contradictory descriptions of New Atheism.

== Background ==
The Evolution of Atheism was published on 2 November 2015 by the Oxford University Press. Author Stephen LeDrew, who is Canadian, was a postdoctoral researcher in sociology at the Centre for the Study of Religion and Society of Uppsala University at the time of the book's publication. It was his first book, adapted from his PhD thesis. LeDrew is an atheist and his aim was to describe the major aims and ideas of the atheist movement. Marek Sullivan of Secularism and Nonreligion said The Evolution of Atheism was "the first book-length, systematic analysis of the New Atheism from a sociological perspective". The book interviews 15 New Atheists, but LeDrew said that a limitation was the lack of statistical or survey evidence.

== Synopsis ==
The book focuses on four major New Atheist figures, collectively known as the "Four Horsemen": Richard Dawkins, Daniel Dennett, Sam Harris and Christopher Hitchens. LeDrew argues that a right-wing branch of atheism—New Atheism—deviates from its traditional associations with classical liberalism, social justice and multiculturalism. The modern atheist movement has three bodies of thought, according to LeDrew: scientific atheism, the view that religion is opposed to scientific truth; secular humanism; and libertarianism combined with rationalism. New Atheism fits in the first category. LeDrew compares this to historical conflicts since the beginning of secularism, such as George Holyoake's arguments with Charles Bradlaugh or the division between libertarian views inspired by Herbert Spencer and egalitarian views based on Friedrich Nietzsche, Sigmund Freud or Karl Marx.

LeDrew believes that, in parallel to religious movements, New Atheism has a fundamentalist and dogmatic adoption of scientism—the view that science is the only method of determining information or values. This leads it towards defense of Western hegemony, Islamophobia, and opposition to progressive views on class, gender and race. LeDrew also says that its focus on rationalism and utopianism creates a tendency towards authoritarianism and individualism. He argues that the rise of New Atheism in the mid-2000s could be attributed to the war on terror, an increasing American Christian right, child sex abuse revelations in the Catholic Church, and declining religiosity across America. He discusses other New Atheist figures such as Steven Pinker, A. C. Grayling, Victor J. Stenger, Ayaan Hirsi Ali and Lawrence Krauss as well as laypeople in the mass movement.

== Reception ==
Publishers Weekly reviewed the book as "a detailed and even-handed examination of the social and political environment surrounding New Atheism". In Choice Reviews, D. R. Boscaljon recommended the book to general readers and undergraduate students to "understand the shape of atheism and how it has changed", praising that it offers "an excellent analysis of tensions and differences within the atheist movement" more broadly than just New Atheism. Library Journal's Christian Graham praised it as "an intelligent and sensitive treatise of contemporary atheism", recommending its "well-researched investigation" to "curious readers of all kinds".

Sullivan criticised "definitional vagueness" in LeDrew's distinction between New Atheism, secular humanism and libertarian rationalism, as he shows that they majorly overlap. Moreover, Sullivan believed that there was not a clear division between humanism and scientism, that LeDrew's characterisation of New Atheism as "ideology" contradicts his later findings, and that LeDrew's comparison to past atheist conflicts are simplified as "cycles never simply repeat". Nonetheless, he found it "an extremely valuable synthesis of existing scholarly work" and "a founding block for future analysis".

Marcus Schulzke praised The Evolution of Atheism for its "thoughtful sociological analysis and original data about grassroots activists". However, Schulzke reviewed that LeDrew's characterisation of New Atheism as "fundamentalist" is a "familiar" but flawed argument, contradicting LeDrew's later analysis of its increasing diversity; similarly, writing that it focuses on a male or middle-class vantage point clashes with his later description of its diversity. Schulzke wrote that the book insufficiently justified why conservatism is characteristic of the "heterogeneous" New Atheism rather than just some of its figures, and is "unsatisfying" in trying to "map the movement" onto a left–right political spectrum.

Tom Flynn, writing in Free Inquiry, found LeDrew to be "insightful" on the topic of New Atheism and "thought-provoking" in his taxonomy of the modern atheist movement; however, he wrote that the book is "marred by significant historical, analytic, and conceptual errors". These include that LeDrew's definition of atheism—as active rejection of belief in God—would exclude Dawkins, that he is inconsistent on whether New Atheism is truly "new", and that he has poor knowledge of the history of atheism. Flynn summarised that the book has "undeniable strengths, but its many and serious flaws erode its value".

David Hoelscher of CounterPunch praised the book for its interviews, "non-technical" prose style, "excellent introduction" to the main figures of New Atheism and for "interesting and relevant evidence" that the movement is conservative on gender issues. He approved that LeDrew "demolishes" the "myth" among atheists that "the belief that atheism is simply a matter of not believing in any gods". However, Hoelscher identified a number of limitations: LeDrew's "crediting of the social sciences with the predominant role in the development of humanistic atheism"; his lack of coverage of racism or of "the Islamophobic New Atheist comedian Bill Maher"; and insufficient mention of "economic injustice" as it relates to atheism, such as to anti-capitalist atheists.
