= Annaka Harris =

American writer

- Born: Annaka Gorton; 1976 (age 49–50)
- Education: New York University (BFA)
- Occupation: Writer
- Notable work: Conscious: A Brief Guide to the Fundamental Mystery of the Mind
- Spouse: Sam Harris (m. 2004)
- Children: 2

Annaka Harris (née Gorton; born 1976) is an American writer. Her work touches on neuroscience, meditation, philosophy of mind and consciousness. She is the author of the New York Times bestseller Conscious: A Brief Guide to the Fundamental Mystery of the Mind (2019) and the children's book I Wonder (2013).

== Biography ==
Harris was the co-founder of the non-profit scientific education group Project Reason in 2007. She edited the 2011 long-form essay and book Lying by her husband Sam Harris. She is the author of the 2013 children's book I Wonder, which is about uncertainty and the nature of reality. She wrote the 2019 New York Times bestselling science book Conscious: A Brief Guide to the Fundamental Mystery of the Mind. Key subjects of Conscious include free will, panpsychism and the hard problem of consciousness. In March 2025 she published her audio documentary series LIGHTS ON, a guided tour of the neuroscience and philosophy of consciousness.

Harris has been married to the neuroscientist and author Sam Harris since 2004. They have two daughters.
