= Antireligion =

Opposition or hostility to religion

Antireligion, also referred to as religiophobia, is opposition or hostility to religion or traditional religious beliefs and practices. It involves opposition to organized religion, religious practices or religious institutions. The term antireligion has also been used to describe opposition to specific forms of supernatural worship or practice, whether organized or not.

Antireligion is distinct from deity-specific positions such as atheism (the lack of belief in deities) and antitheism (in some narrower interpretations, an opposition specifically to belief in deities); although "antireligionists" may also be atheists or antitheists. Unlike in said interpretations of antitheism, antireligion is also against those religions that do not have deities, such as some sects of Buddhism and Jainism.

== History ==
Some Catholics have accused the Reformation of Martin Luther as having inspired anti-religiosity. Early anti religious tendencies were expressed by skeptics such as Christopher Marlowe. Significant antireligion was advanced during the Age of Enlightenment, as early as the 17th century. Baron d'Holbach's book Christianity Unveiled, published in 1766, attacked not only Christianity but religion in general as an impediment to the moral advancement of humanity. According to historian Michael Burleigh, antireligion found its first mass expression of barbarity in revolutionary France as "organised ... irreligion...an 'anti-clerical' and self-styled 'non-religious' state" responded violently to religious influence over society.

== State atheism ==
=== Soviet Union ===
The Soviet Union adopted the political ideology of Marxism–Leninism and by extension the policy of state atheism, which opposed the growth of religions. It directed varying degrees of antireligious efforts at varying faiths, depending on what threat they posed to the Soviet state, and their willingness to subordinate themselves to political authority. In the 1930s, during the Stalinist period, the government destroyed church buildings or put them into secular use (as museums of religion and atheism, clubs or storage facilities), executed clergy, prohibited the publication of most religious material and persecuted some members of religious groups. Less violent attempts to reduce or eliminate the influence of religion in society were also carried out at other times in Soviet history. For instance, it was usually necessary to be an atheist in order to acquire any important political position or any prestigious scientific job; thus, many people became atheists in order to advance their careers. Some estimate that 12–15 million Christians were killed in the Soviet Union. Up to 500,000 Russian Orthodox Christians were persecuted by the Soviet government, not including other religious groups. At least 106,300 Russian clergymen were executed between 1937 and 1941. The Moldavian Soviet Socialist Republic targeted numerous clergy for arrest and interrogation as enemies of the state, and many churches, mosques, and synagogues were converted to secular uses.

=== Albania ===
The People's Republic of Albania had an objective for the eventual elimination of all religion in Albania with the goal of creating an atheist nation, which it declared it had achieved in 1967. In 1976, Albania implemented a constitutional ban on religious activity and actively promoted atheism. The government nationalized most property of religious institutions and used it for non-religious purposes, such as cultural centers for young people. Religious literature was banned. Many clergy and theists were tried, tortured, and executed. All foreign Roman Catholic clergy were expelled in 1946, and Albania officially tried to eradicate religion.

=== Romania ===
Authorities in the People's Republic of Romania aimed to move towards an atheistic society, in which religion would be considered as the ideology of the bourgeoisie; the régime also set to propagate among the laboring masses in science, politics and culture to help them fight superstition and mysticism, and initiated an anti-religious campaign aimed at reducing the influence of religion in society. After the communist takeover in 1948, some church personnel were imprisoned for political crimes.

=== Cambodia ===
The Khmer Rouge attempted to eliminate Cambodia's cultural heritage, including its religions, particularly Theravada Buddhism. Over the four years of Khmer Rouge rule, at least 1.5 million Cambodians perished. Of the sixty thousand Buddhist monks that previously existed, only three thousand survived the Cambodian genocide.

== Notable antireligious people ==
=== Philosophers ===
- Al-Ma'arri (973–1057), Arab philosopher, poet and writer.
- Thomas Paine (1737–1809), British-American writer and deist who wrote a scathing critique on religion in The Age of Reason (1793–94): "All national institutions of churches, whether Jewish, Christian, or Turkish [i.e. Muslim], appear to me no other than human inventions set up to terrify and enslave mankind, and monopolize power and profit."
- Max Stirner (1806-1856), German philosopher. He said that religion and the concept of God and even morality is a "spook” a made up social construct.
- Karl Marx (1818–1883), German philosopher, social scientist, socialist. He said "religion is the sigh of the oppressed creature, the heart of a heartless world, and the soul of soulless conditions. It is the opium of the people. The abolition of religion as the illusory happiness of the people is the demand for their real happiness. To call on them to give up their illusions about their condition is to call on them to give up a condition that requires illusions. The criticism of religion is, therefore, in embryo, the criticism of that vale of tears of which religion is the halo. The abolition of religion as the illusory happiness of the people is the demand for their real happiness."
- John Dewey (1859–1952), an American pragmatist philosopher, who believed neither religion nor metaphysics could provide legitimate moral or social values, though scientific empiricism.
- Bertrand Russell (1872–1970), English logician and philosopher who believed that authentic philosophy could only be pursued given an atheistic foundation of "unyielding despair". In 1948, he famously debated with the Jesuit priest and philosophical historian Father Frederick Copleston on the existence of God.
- Ayn Rand (1905–1982), Russian-American novelist and philosopher, founder of Objectivism.
- Rajneesh (born Chandra Mohan Jain; 11 December 1931 – 19 January 1990), also known as Acharya Rajneesh, Bhagwan Shree Rajneesh, and later as Osho, was an Indian Godman, philosopher, mystic, and founder of the Rajneesh movement. He was viewed as a controversial new religious movement leader during his life. He rejected institutional religions, Rajneesh said that spiritual experience could not be organized into any one system of religious dogma.
- Richard Dawkins (born 1941), English biologist, one of the "Four Horsemen" of New Atheism. He wrote The God Delusion, criticizing belief in the divine, in 2006.
- Christopher Hitchens (1949–2011), English-American author and journalist, one of the "Four Horsemen" of New Atheism. He wrote God Is Not Great: How Religion Poisons Everything in 2007.
- Lawrence M. Krauss (born 1954), a theoretical physicist, author of A Universe from Nothing.
- Steven Pinker (born 1954), Canadian-American cognitive scientist who argued religion incites violence.
- Sam Harris (born 1967), author of The End of Faith. He said, "If I could wave a magic wand and get rid of either rape or religion, I would not hesitate to get rid of religion."

=== Politicians ===
- Vladimir Lenin (1870–1924), Soviet leader from 1917 until 1924, who believed all religions to be "the organs of bourgeois reaction, used for the protection of the exploitation and the stupefaction of the working class".
- Jawaharlal Nehru (1889-1964), first prime minister of India who said "The spectacle of what is called religion, or at any rate organised religion, in India and elsewhere, has filled me with horror and I have frequently condemned it ...." in his autobiography.
- Nikita Khrushchev (1894–1971), Soviet leader in 1953–1964, who initiated, among other measures, the 1958–1964 Soviet anti-religious campaign.
- Plutarco Elías Calles (1877–1945), president of Mexico between 1924 and 1928. During his government the Cristero War began.
- Joseph Stalin (18 December 1878 – 5 March 1953), while he was the leader of the USSR he worked on ending religion in the country.
- Enver Hoxha (1908–1985), leader of Albania who described himself as an "Arch atheist" and sought to eradicate religion in his country, going as far as to ban religiously based names.

=== Others ===
- Haruki Murakami, Japanese novelist who wrote: "God only exists in people's minds. Especially in Japan, God's always has been a kind of flexible concept. Look at what happened to the war. Douglas MacArthur ordered the divine emperor to quit being a God, and he did, making a speech saying he was just an ordinary person."
- Ricky Gervais, British comedian and actor who has been critical of religion in sketches and other comedic performances.
- H. P. Lovecraft, American horror writer and creator of the Cthulhu Mythos, who, according to S. T. Joshi, "considered religion not merely false but dangerous to social and political progress."
- Bill Maher, American comedian, who wrote and starred in Religulous, a 2008 documentary criticizing and mocking religion.
- Marcus Brigstocke, British comedian.
- George Carlin, American comedian who frequently mocked religion throughout his career.
- James Randi, former magician, professional "debunker" of psychics, outspoken atheist and founder of the James Randi Educational Foundation.
- Philip Roth, a Jewish-American novelist who described himself as anti-religious.
- Matt Dillahunty, host of The Atheist Experience and former president of the Atheist Community of Austin, engages in debates with Apologists.

== See also ==
- Anti-Buddhism
- Anti-Catholicism
- Anti-Christian sentiment
- Anti-clericalism
  - in France
- Anti-Hinduism
- Anti-Islamism, as distinct from Criticism of Islam and Islamophobia
- Anti-Judaism
  - Antisemitism
- Anti-Mormonism
- Anti-Protestantism
- Conflict thesis
- Criticism of religion
- Irreligion
- Nontheistic religion
- Faith and rationality
- Freethought
- Persecution of Christians
- Relationship between religion and science
- Religious intolerance
- Religious persecution
- Religious segregation
