= Mark S. Cohen =

American neuroscientist

- Born: Mark Steven Cohen; 1956 (age 69–70); Saint Paul, Minnesota, U.S.
- Education: Stanford University (BA); Rockefeller University (PhD)
- Scientific career
- Fields: Neuroscience
- Workplaces: University of California, Los Angeles
- Thesis: Cutaneous and supraspinal control of the axial muscles in the rat: Implications for behavior (1985)
- Doctoral advisors: Susan Schwartz-Giblin, Donald Pfaff
- Doctoral students: Sam Harris
- Other notable students: Billi Gordon
- Website: www.brainmapping.org/MarkCohen/

Mark Steven Cohen (born 1956) is an American neuroscientist and early pioneer of functional brain imaging using magnetic resonance imaging. He is currently a professor of psychiatry, neurology, radiology, psychology, biomedical physics, and biomedical engineering at the Semel Institute for Neuroscience and Human Behavior and the Staglin Center for Cognitive Neuroscience. He is also a performing musician.

== Biography ==
Cohen was born in St. Paul, Minnesota. He was raised in Stanford, California. In 1974, Cohen began his undergraduate studies in engineering at the Massachusetts Institute of Technology before transferring to Stanford University in 1976, where he received his A.B. degree in human biology in 1979. He then went to the Rockefeller University, where he trained under Victor Wilson, Donald Pfaff, and Susan Schwartz Giblin, receiving his Ph.D. in 1985 for his work on the pudendal nerve evoked response and its modulation by steroid hormones. In 1985 Cohen joined the MRI Applications Group at Siemens Medical Solutions where he began a career in MRI that was focused originally on education and on technological improvements to reduce scan times. From 1988 to 1990 he directed the applications program at Advanced NMR Systems in Woburn Massachusetts, a small startup dedicated to the creation of a practical echo planar imaging instrument. He joined the faculty at Harvard Massachusetts General Hospital in 1990, where he directed the "Hyperscan" fast imaging laboratory and was the director of the MRI education program until 1993.

In 1993 Cohen joined the faculty at UCLA, holding professorships in Psychiatry, Neurology, Radiology, Biomedical Physics, Psychology and Bioengineering. He served on the UCLA Council for Research from 2011 to 2016 and as its chair for two years.

In 2005 Cohen established the UCLA/Semel Neuroimaging Training Program (NITP), funded by NIH, and he directed the program for ten years. The NITP, which provided stipend support for both US and International students, provided core training in statistics, analog and digital signal processing, computation, electronics, neurophysiology, and a range of imaging methods. NITP summer training sessions provided immersive training in advanced MRI methods for more than 350 attendees and were simulcasted to more than 2,000 viewers in more than 160 countries. The NITP was profiled in both Science and Nature magazines.

== Educator ==
Cohen served as the Chair of the Education Committee for the Society of Magnetic Resonance and the Chair of the Education Committee for the Society of Magnetic Resonance in Medicine. He received both a Post-Doctoral Mentoring Award and an Excellence in (undergraduate) Mentoring Award from UCLA. He also was given the Education in Neuroimaging Award from the Organization for Human Brain Mapping. He mentored a total of 40 doctoral students at UCLA, UC Santa Barbara, Caltech, and the University of Southern California, as well as seven post-doctoral fellows.

Cohen is active in international scientific relations, especially in Cuba, and his commentaries have been solicited and published in The Guardian, The New Yorker, BuzzFeed, and other news media.

== Academic research ==
Cohen's achievements in MRI include the earliest clinical uses of echo-planar imaging, defining the safe boundaries of operation of high-end MRI units. While at Advanced NMR Systems he partnered with Jack Belliveau and others at Harvard University to create the first functional images of the human brain by MRI using the ultra-fast instrument he and his collaborators built. The latter work appeared in Science as cover art, using a now canonical image that Cohen designed. After moving to Harvard he went on to play a crucial role in the second major advancement in functional MRI - allowing observation of brain function without injected contrast agents - that resulted in Kenneth Kwong's seminal paper (in the same year that Ogawa and colleagues submitted their results subsequently published a year later in PNAS)), using the ultra-fast instrument he and his collaborators built. As a co-inventor of functional MRI, Cohen created an iconic cover for Science magazine that became a canonical standard for presentation of such data, and that has been reproduced widely.

With his original training in neurophysiology, Cohen was interested developing a practical means of recording brain electrical signals EEG simultaneously with fMRI. The method that he created was licensed to Electrical Geodesics, Inc. and sold as the GES300MR. With his student, Robin Goldman, he demonstrated strong functional associations between MRI and EEG signals.

Cohen has developed multiple experimental methods to enable studies of the brain's physical structure/mental structure interface. These methods include ultra-fast imaging techniques, fMRI, simultaneous EEG and MRI, machine-learning methods for decoding brain images, and focused ultrasound brain stimulation. He has applied these tools to the investigation of mental imagery, time perception, racial/religious bias, the neurology of belief, and lie detection. He also has used MRI methods to better detect and understand major psychiatric and neurological disorders including schizophrenia, obsessive compulsive disorder, epilepsy, depression, dementia, bipolar disorder, addiction, ADHD, autism, and others.
