= Free Will (book) =

2012 book by Sam Harris

- Author: Sam Harris
- Language: English
- Subject: Free will
- Published: 2012
- Publication place: United States
- Media type: Print (Paperback)
- ISBN: 978-1451683400
- Preceded by: Lying
- Followed by: Waking Up: A Guide to Spirituality Without Religion

Free Will is a 2012 book by American philosopher Sam Harris. It argues that free will is an illusion created by the inner workings of the brain, but that this fact ultimately does not undermine morality or diminish the importance of political and social freedom, and that it can and should change the way we think about some of the most important questions in life.

== Summary ==
Harris says the idea of metaphysical free will "cannot be mapped on to any conceivable reality" and is logically and scientifically incoherent. According to Harris, science "reveals you to be a biochemical puppet." People's thoughts and intentions, Harris says, "emerge from background causes of which we are unaware and over which we exert no conscious control." Harris takes the position that the physical world is governed by cause and effect and that the brain is a physical object governed by physical laws (e.g., classical Newton physics). In this infinite chain of cause and effect stretching back to the Big Bang, every choice we make is made as a result of preceding causes. These choices we make are determined by those causes, and are therefore not really free choices at all. Furthermore, as thoughts arise from causes that we cannot control, our actions influenced by these thoughts are also uncontrollable. Harris also draws a distinction between conscious and unconscious reactions to the world. Even without free will, consciousness has an important role to play in the choices we make. Harris argues that this realization about the immaterial human mind does not undermine morality and need not diminish human dignity or social and political freedom, but it can and should change the way we think about some of the most important questions in life.

== Reception ==
The widely read book has been the subject of both praise and criticism from many philosophers and important thinkers. Many philosophers have criticized or challenged the strong deterministic intuitions presented in the book. For example, in a critical review, philosopher and cognitive scientist Daniel Dennett argued that Free Will attacks only the "popular" or commonsense idea of free will, which Dennett considers to be flawed. He states that "improvements" to the popular idea of free will do exist and that Harris should have instead focused on these. Harris published a response.

== See also ==
- Immanuel Kant
- Neuroscience of free will
- Decision making
