= Letter to a Christian Nation =

2006 book by Sam Harris

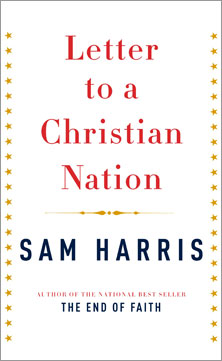
- Author: Sam Harris
- Language: English
- Subject: Criticism of Christianity, Ethics
- Publisher: Knopf (hardcover), Vintage (paperback)
- Publication date: September 19, 2006 (hardcover), January 8, 2008 (paperback)
- Publication place: United States
- Media type: Hardcover, paperback
- Pages: 96 (hardcover), 144 (paperback)
- ISBN: 0-307-26577-3
- OCLC: 70158553
- Dewey Decimal: 277.3
- LC Class: BR516. H255 2006
- Preceded by: The End of Faith
- Followed by: The Moral Landscape

Letter to a Christian Nation is a 2006 book by Sam Harris, written in response to feedback he received following the publication of his first book The End of Faith. The book is written in the form of an open letter to a Christian in the United States. Harris states that his aim is "to demolish the intellectual and moral pretensions of Christianity in its most committed forms." In October it entered the New York Times Best Seller list at number seven.

== Synopsis ==
Harris addresses his arguments to members of the conservative Christian Right in America. In answer to their appeal to the Bible on questions of morality, he points to selected items from the Old Testament Mosaic law (death for adultery, homosexuality, disobedience to parents etc.), and contrasts this with, for example, the complete non-violence of Jainism. Harris argues that the reliance on religious dogma can create a false morality, which is divorced from the reality of human suffering and the efforts to alleviate it; thus religious objections stand in the way of condom use in Africa to prevent the spread of HIV and AIDS, embryonic stem cell research, comprehensive sex education, abortion, and the use of the new HPV vaccine.

We read the Golden Rule and judge it to be a brilliant distillation of many of our ethical impulses. And then we come across another of God's teachings on morality: if a man discovers on his wedding night that his bride is not a virgin, he must stone her to death on her father's doorstep (Deuteronomy 22:13-21).

Harris also addresses the problem of evil—the difficulty in believing in a good God who allows disasters like Hurricane Katrina—and the conflict between religion and science. A 2005 Gallup poll suggested that 53% of Americans are sympathetic to creationism, so Harris spends some time arguing for evolution and against the notion of Intelligent Design:

Despite a full century of scientific insights attesting to the antiquity of the earth, more than half of our neighbors believe that the entire cosmos was created six thousand years ago. This is, incidentally, about a thousand years after the Sumerians invented glue.

Harris considers the variety of religions in the world, citing a religious basis for many ethnic and inter-communal conflicts. Contrary to those who advocate religious tolerance, mutual respect, and interfaith dialogue, Harris contends that such values only make it more difficult to criticize faith-based extremism. While holding that spiritual experiences can be valuable and life-affirming—he expends considerable space in The End of Faith in arguing that they are necessary—Harris rejects their link to religious beliefs. He argues that religion may have served some useful purpose for humanity in the past, but that it is now the greatest impediment to building a "global civilization."

== Promotion ==
The book was released with laudatory endorsements from Richard Dawkins, Leonard Susskind, Roger Penrose, Matt Ridley, Desmond Morris, Janna Levin, and Michael Gazzaniga. There was also an unsigned blurb attributed by the publisher to a "New York Times best selling author", who wrote: "I can't sign my name to this blurb. As a New York Times best selling author of books about business, my career will evaporate if I endorse a book that challenges the deeply held superstitions and bigotry of the masses. That's exactly why you should (no, you must) read this angry and honest book right away. As long as science and rational thought are under attack by the misguided yet pious majority, our nation is in jeopardy. I'm scared. You should be too. Please buy two, one for you and one for a friend you care about."

== Reception ==
Commenting in The New York Times Book Review during the 2008 U.S. presidential campaign, Steven Pinker chose Letter to a Christian Nation as the one book that he would want Barack Obama to read, saying: "Some have criticized the uncompromising tone of this atheist best seller, but it's mild stuff compared with the acid you guys have been flinging around. The book will put you in touch with the fastest-growing religious minority in this country, help you understand why our European allies consider us so backward and encourage you to keep your distance from kooks who call themselves spiritual leaders."

Reviewing the book in The New York Observer, Emily Bobrow said: "His new book may be smug in spots, but Mr. Harris makes a good case for a new and intellectually honest conversation about morality and human suffering."

Reviewing the book in the San Francisco Chronicle, Jean E. Barker wrote: "This combination of ruthless argument with polemic designed to provoke... will further delight Harris' supporters and infuriate his critics. His glee in his own intelligence aside, Harris is stricken by the amount of preventable suffering in the world and has identified ending religion as the cure... This small book adds little new to Harris' argument in "The End of Faith"—indeed, he repeats a number of his examples. Its strengths are the clarity of Harris' writing, his critique of religion's current entanglement in public policy and his continuing willingness to speak up about some very controversial ideas, even if they're difficult for others to hear."

The Washington Post reported in 2006 that Letter stimulated both strong positive and strong negative reactions, attracting both a large audience and strong counter-reactions from religious scholars. The Post said the book "doesn't drill many new theological wells," but that Harris "might be the first man to be anointed 'Hot Atheist' in Rolling Stone magazine."

Jamie Doward of The Observer said Harris "wastes no time taking on his enemy – Christian fundamentalism of the sort that influences President George W. Bush."

Writing in an editorial in The Seattle Times, Intelligent Design proponent David Klinghoffer said that Letter to a Christian Nation and Richard Dawkins's The God Delusion were the top two bestselling religious books. However, he went on to say that "... Dawkins and Harris seem unfamiliar with religious tradition as biblical monotheists know it from personal experience and deep study. Frankly, the success of the new atheist faith would be hard to imagine without today's soaring levels of societal religious illiteracy."

Writing in The Observer, Stephanie Merritt described Harris as providing "concise anti-religious apologetics," but said that "[h]e does not seem to comprehend the mindset of those he addresses."

In The New York Times, Peter Steinfels wrote that Harris's Letter and Dawkins's The God Delusion were receiving criticism "not primarily, it should be pointed out, from the pious, which would hardly be noteworthy, but from avowed atheists as well as scientists and philosophers writing in publications like The New Republic and The New York Review of Books, not known as cells in the vast God-fearing conspiracy."

Michael Novak, a Catholic philosopher, wrote in the conservative National Review that "[t]he letter that Harris claims is intended for a Christian nation is in fact wholly uninterested in Christianity on any level, is hugely ignorant, and essentially represents his own love letter to himself, on account of his being superior to the stupid citizens among whom he lives."

The New Criterion described Letter as condescending, saying "Harris is too choked on bile, or at best incredulity ('we stand dumbstruck by you,' he says, italics and all) to admit that his addressees are worth speaking with. This is in part because his chosen antagonist is 'Christianity at its most divisive, injurious, and retrograde' even though it's questionable whether anything was ever accomplished by attacking a system at its most 'retrograde.'"

Publishers Weekly characterized Letter as "sometimes simplistic and misguided." The review elaborates that "Harris overstates his case by misunderstanding religious faith, as when he makes the audaciously naïve statement that 'mysticism is a rational enterprise; religion is not.'"

== Responding books ==
The following books have been written in response to Letter to a Christian Nation:

- Aikman, David (April 2008). The Delusion of Disbelief: Why the New Atheism is a Threat to Your Life, Liberty, and Pursuit of Happiness. Tyndale House. ISBN 978-1-4143-1708-3.
- Leahy, Michael Patrick. Letter to an Atheist
- McDurmon, Joel. The Return of the Village Atheist, ISBN 978-0915815784
- Metcalf, R.C.. Letter to a Christian Nation: Counter Point, ISBN 978-0-595-43264-6
- Wilson, Douglas. Letter from a Christian Citizen
- Zacharias, Ravi. The End of Reason
