= The End of Faith =

2004 book by Sam Harris

- Cover of the first edition
- Author: Sam Harris
- Language: English
- Subject: Criticism of religion
- Publisher: W. W. Norton
- Publication date: August 11, 2004
- Publication place: United States
- Media type: Print (hardcover and paperback)
- Pages: 349 (paperback) 336 (hardcover)
- ISBN: 0-7432-6809-1
- OCLC: 62265386
- Followed by: Letter to a Christian Nation

The End of Faith: Religion, Terror, and the Future of Reason is a 2004 book by Sam Harris, concerning organized religion, the clash between religious faith and rational thought, and the problem of intolerance that correlates with religious fundamentalism.

Harris began writing the book during what he described as a period of "collective grief and stupefaction" following the September 11, 2001 attacks. The book comprises a general critique of all religious belief.

The book was published August 11, 2004, and it was awarded the PEN/Martha Albrand Award for First Nonfiction the following year. The paperback edition was published in October 2005. In the same month it entered The New York Times Best Seller list at number four, and remained on the list for a total of 33 weeks.

In response to criticism and feedback regarding The End of Faith, Harris wrote Letter to a Christian Nation two years later.

== Synopsis ==
The End of Faith opens with a literary account of a day in the life of a suicide bomber – his last day. In an introductory chapter, Harris calls for an end to respect and tolerance for the competing belief systems of religion, which he describes as being "all equally uncontaminated by evidence". While focusing on the dangers posed by religious extremist groups armed with weapons of mass destruction, Harris is equally critical of religious moderation, which he describes as "the context in which religious violence can never be adequately opposed."

Harris continues by examining the nature of belief itself, challenging the notion that we can in any sense enjoy freedom of belief, and arguing that "belief is a fount of action in potentia." Instead he posits that in order to be useful, beliefs must be both logically coherent, and truly representative of the real world. Insofar as religious belief fails to ground itself in empirical evidence, Harris likens religion to a form of mental illness which, he says, "allows otherwise normal human beings to reap the fruits of madness and consider them holy." He argues that there may be "sanity in numbers", but that it is "merely an accident of history that it is considered normal in our society to believe that the Creator of the universe can hear your prayers, while it is demonstrative of mental illness to believe that he is communicating with you by having the rain tap in Morse code on your bedroom window."

Harris follows this with a brief survey of Christianity down the ages, examining the Inquisition and persecutions of witches and Jews. He contends that, far from being an aberration, the torture of heretics was a logical expression of Christian doctrine – one which, he says, was clearly justified by men such as Saint Augustine. Going still further, Harris sees the Holocaust as essentially drawing its inspiration from historical Christian anti-Semitism. "Knowingly or not", he says, "the Nazis were agents of religion."

Among the controversial aspects of The End of Faith is an uncompromising assessment and criticism of Islamism, which Harris describes as being a "cult of death". He infers a clear link between Islamic teaching and terrorist atrocities such as 9/11, a notion he supports with quotations from the Koran that call for the use of violence.

He also presents data from the Pew Research Center, purporting to show that significant percentages of Muslims worldwide would justify suicide bombing as a legitimate tactic. In an attack on what he terms "leftist unreason", Harris criticises Noam Chomsky among others for, in his view, displaying an illogical willingness to lay the entire blame for such attitudes upon U.S. foreign policy.

Harris also critiques the role of the Christian right in the United States, in influencing such areas as drug policies, embryonic stem cell research, and AIDS prevention in the developing world. Harris singles out what he sees as theocratic leading figures from both the legislature and the judiciary for what he perceives as an unabashed failure to separate church and state in their various domains. "Not only do we still eat the offal of the ancient world", he asserts, "we are positively smug about it."

Next, Harris goes on to outline what he terms a "science of good and evil" – a rational approach to ethics, which he claims must necessarily be predicated upon questions of human happiness and suffering. He talks about the need to sustain "moral communities", a venture in which he feels that the separate religious moral identities of the "saved" and the "damned" can play no part. But Harris is critical of the stance of moral relativism, and also of what he calls "the false choice of pacifism". In another controversial passage, he compares the ethical questions raised by collateral damage and judicial torture during war. He concludes that collateral damage is more ethically troublesome. "If we are unwilling to torture, we should be unwilling to wage modern war", Harris concludes.

Finally, Harris turns to spirituality, where he especially takes his inspiration from the practices of Eastern religion. He writes that there have been mystics in the west and calls some of these "extraordinary men and women", such as Meister Eckhart, Saint John of the Cross, Saint Teresa of Avila, Saint Seraphim of Sarov, but that, as far as Western spirituality is concerned, "we appear to have been standing on the shoulders of dwarfs." He discusses the nature of consciousness, and how our sense of "self" can be made to vanish by employing the techniques of meditation. Harris quotes from Eastern mystics such as Padmasambhava and Nisargadatta Maharaj, but he does not admit any supernatural element into his argument – "mysticism is a rational enterprise", he contends, "religion is not". He later elaborates: "The mystic has reasons for what he believes, and these reasons are empirical." He states that it is possible for one's experience of the world to be "radically transformed", but that we must speak about the possibility in "rational terms".

The only angels we need invoke are those of our better nature: reason, honesty, and love. The only demons we must fear are those that lurk inside every human mind: ignorance, hatred, greed, and faith, which is surely the devil's masterpiece.

== Reception ==
=== Positive ===
Writing for The Independent, Johann Hari was largely positive, describing the book as "a brave, pugilistic attempt to demolish the walls that currently insulate religious people from criticism."

Other broadly positive reviews have come from Natalie Angier, Daniel Blue, Stephanie Merritt, and Richard Dawkins.

=== Negative ===
In a review for Free Inquiry, the editor Thomas W. Flynn alleged that Harris had allowed his argument to become clouded by his personal politics and by his use of spiritual language. Harris later described Flynn's review as "mixed, misleading, and ultimately exasperating."

Another review by David Boulton for New Humanist described the book as containing "startling oversimplifications, exaggerations and elisions."

Critical reviews from Christians have included those by R. Albert Mohler, Jr. for The Christian Post, and Matthew Simpson for Christianity Today. Madeleine Bunting, writing in The Guardian, quotes Harris as saying "some propositions are so dangerous that it may even be ethical to kill people for believing them." Bunting comments, "[t]his sounds like exactly the kind of argument put forward by those who ran the Inquisition."

Quoting the same passage, theologian Catherine Keller asks, "[c]ould there be a more dangerous proposition than that?" and argues that the "anti-tolerance" it represents would "dismantle" the Jeffersonian wall between church and state.

=== Response ===
The paperback edition of The End of Faith, published in 2005, contained a new afterword in which Harris responded to some of the more popular criticisms he has received since publication. His essay "Response to Controversy" also clarified the context of an apparently troubling passage, which was that he was referring to very specific cases like that of the religiously motivated terrorist, where the attempt to kill a murderous terrorist would essentially constitute killing someone for a belief they hold, namely the belief that unbelievers of their particular faith should be killed.

== See also ==
- Criticism of religion
- New Atheism
