= Lying (Harris book) =

2011 book by Sam Harris

- First edition
- Author: Sam Harris
- Language: English
- Subject: Morality
- Published: 2011
- Publisher: Four Elephants Press
- Publication place: United States
- Media type: Print
- Pages: 105
- ISBN: 978-1940051000
- Preceded by: The Moral Landscape
- Followed by: Free Will

Lying is a 2011 long-form essay book by American author and neuroscientist Sam Harris. Harris argues that we can radically simplify our lives and improve society merely by telling the truth in situations where others often lie.

== Reception ==
Jim Danielson of the Lincoln Journal Star praised Lying, writing, "One of the real values of reading this book is that it causes the reader to reflect on our own life and lies." He added, "This book is a quick read, but it is long on contemplating life."
