= Sam Harris =

American neuroscientist and philosopher (born 1967)

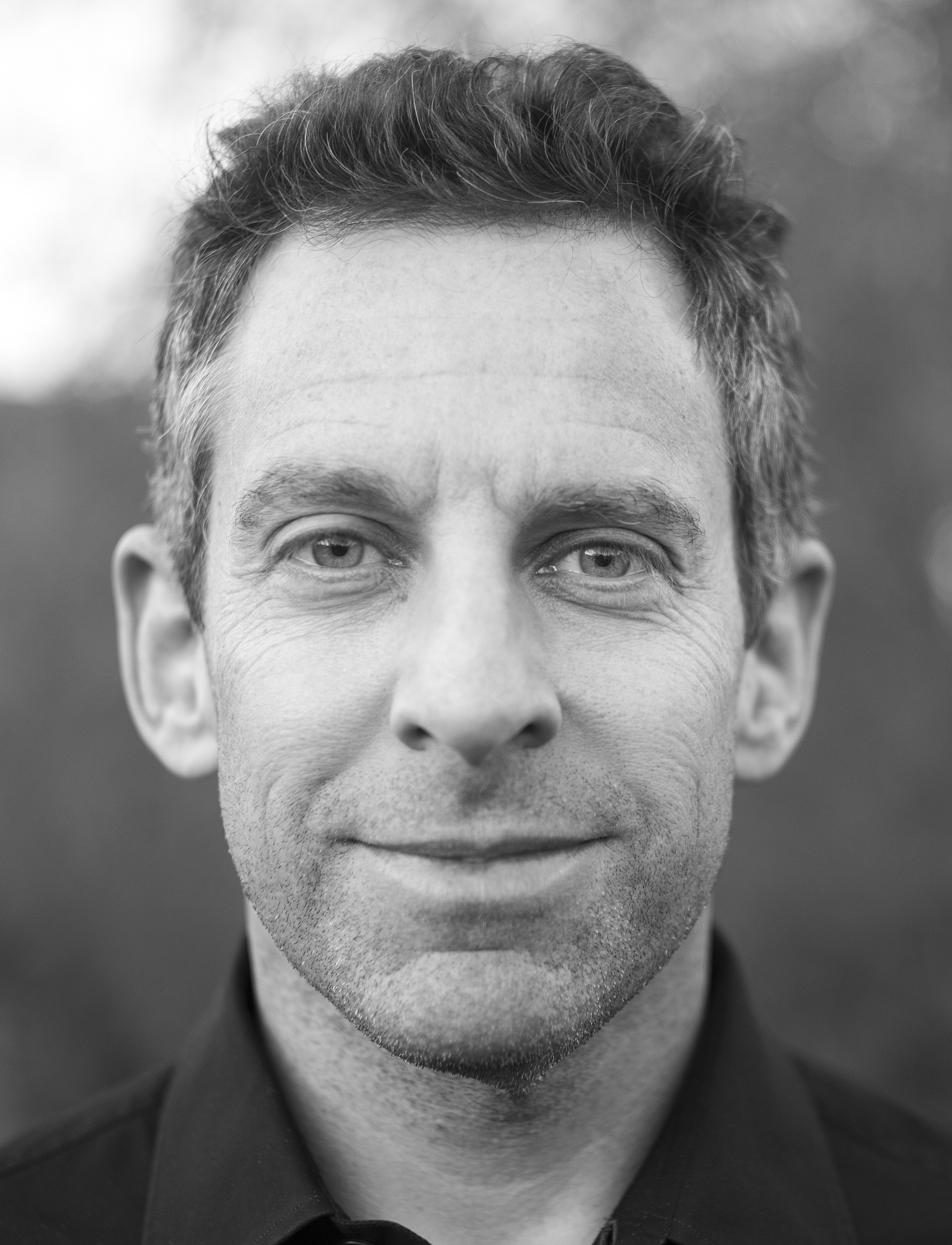
- Harris in 2016
- Born: Samuel Benjamin Harris; April 9, 1967 (age 59); Los Angeles, California, U.S.
- Education: Stanford University (BA); University of California, Los Angeles (PhD)
- Occupations: Neuroscientist; philosopher; author; podcaster
- Spouse: Annaka Gorton (m. 2004)
- Children: 2
- Parents: Berkeley Harris; Susan Spivak
- Writing career
- Subjects: Neuroscience; philosophy; religion; spirituality; ethics; politics
- Notable awards: PEN/Martha Albrand Award; Webby Award

Education
- Thesis: The moral landscape: How science could determine human values (2009)
- Doctoral advisor: Mark Cohen

Philosophical work
- Era: Contemporary philosophy
- Region: Western philosophy
- Website: samharris.org

Samuel Benjamin Harris (born April 9, 1967) is an American neuroscientist, philosopher, author, and podcast host. His work includes a range of topics, including rationality, religion, ethics, free will, determinism, neuroscience, meditation, psychedelics, philosophy of mind, politics, terrorism, and artificial intelligence. Harris came to prominence for his criticism of religion, and he is known as one of the "Four Horsemen" of New Atheism, along with Richard Dawkins, Christopher Hitchens, and Daniel Dennett.

Harris's first book, The End of Faith (2004), won the PEN/Martha Albrand Award for First Nonfiction and remained on The New York Times Best Seller list for 33 weeks. He has since written six additional books: Letter to a Christian Nation (2006); The Moral Landscape: How Science Can Determine Human Values (2010); the essay Lying (2011); the short book Free Will (2012); Waking Up: A Guide to Spirituality Without Religion (2014); and (with British writer Maajid Nawaz) Islam and the Future of Tolerance: A Dialogue (2015). His work has been translated into over 20 languages.

Since September 2013, Harris has hosted the Making Sense podcast (originally titled Waking Up). He also launched a meditation app called Waking Up, promoting secular mindfulness practices. Harris has debated with many prominent figures on religion, including Reza Aslan, David Wolpe, Robert Wright, Rick Warren, William Lane Craig, Jordan Peterson and Deepak Chopra. Some critics have argued that Harris's writings and public statements on Islam are Islamophobic; Harris and his supporters reject that characterization, arguing instead that the label is sometimes used to silence criticism.

== Early life and education ==
Samuel Benjamin Harris was born in Los Angeles, California, on April 9, 1967. He is the son of the late actor Berkeley Harris, who appeared mainly in Western films, and television writer and producer Susan Harris (née Spivak), who created Soap and The Golden Girls, among other series. His father, born in North Carolina, came from a Quaker background, and his mother is Jewish. He was raised by his mother following his parents' divorce when he was age two. Harris has stated that his upbringing was entirely secular and that his parents rarely discussed religion, though he also stated that he was not raised as an atheist.

While his original major was in English, Harris became interested in philosophical questions while at Stanford University after an experience with MDMA. The experience interested him in the idea he might be able to achieve spiritual insights without the use of drugs. Leaving Stanford in his second year, a quarter after his psychoactive experience, he visited India and Nepal, where he studied meditation with teachers of Buddhist and Hindu religions, including Dilgo Khyentse. For a few weeks in the early 1990s, he was a volunteer guard in the security detail of the Dalai Lama.

In 1997, after eleven years overseas, Harris returned to Stanford, completing a B.A. degree in philosophy in 2000. Harris began writing his first book, The End of Faith, immediately after the September 11 attacks. He received a Ph.D. in cognitive neuroscience in 2009 from the University of California, Los Angeles, using functional magnetic resonance imaging to conduct research into the neural basis of belief, disbelief, and uncertainty. His thesis was titled The Moral Landscape: How Science Could Determine Human Values. His advisor was Mark S. Cohen.

== Career ==
=== Writing ===
Harris's writing concerns philosophy, neuroscience, and criticism of religion. He came to prominence for his criticism of religion (Islam in particular) and he is described as one of the Four Horsemen of Atheism, along with Richard Dawkins, Christopher Hitchens, and Daniel Dennett. He has written for publications such as The New York Times, the Los Angeles Times, The Economist, The Times (of London), The Boston Globe, and The Atlantic. Five of Harris's books have been New York Times bestsellers, and his writing has been translated into over 20 languages. The End of Faith (2004) remained on The New York Times Best Seller list for 33 weeks.

=== Podcast ===
In September 2013, Harris began releasing the Waking Up podcast (since re-titled Making Sense). Episodes vary in length but often last over two hours. Releases do not follow a regular schedule. The podcast focuses on a wide array of topics related to science and spirituality, including philosophy, religion, morality, free will, neuroscience, meditation, psychedelics, politics, terrorism, and artificial intelligence. Harris has interviewed a wide range of guests, including scientists, philosophers, spiritual teachers, and authors. Guests have included Jordan Peterson, Daniel Dennett, Janna Levin, Diane Musho Hamilton, Peter Singer, and David Chalmers.

=== Meditation app ===
In September 2018, Harris released a meditation course app, Waking Up with Sam Harris. The app provides daily meditations; long guided meditations; daily "Moments" (brief meditations and reminders); conversations with thought leaders in psychology, meditation, philosophy, psychedelics, and other disciplines; a selection of lessons on various topics, such as Mind & Emotion, Free Will, and Doing Good; and more. Users of the app are introduced to several types of meditation, such as mindfulness meditation, vipassanā-style meditation, loving-kindness meditation, and Dzogchen. In September 2020, Harris announced his commitment to donate at least 10% of Waking Up's profits to highly effective charities, thus becoming the first company to sign the Giving What We Can pledge for companies. The pledge was retroactive, taking into account the profits since the day the app launched two years previously. Waking Up and Harris produced the 2026 documentary Unraveling the Dream: Psychedelics, Awakening, and the Brain.

== Socio-religious views ==
=== Religion ===
Harris is generally a critic of religion, and is considered a leading figure in the New Atheist movement. Harris is particularly opposed to what he refers to as dogmatic belief, and says that "Pretending to know things one doesn't know is a betrayal of science – and yet it is the lifeblood of religion." While purportedly opposed to religion in general and their belief systems, Harris believes that all religions are not created equal. Often invoking the non-violent nature of Jainism to contrast with Islam, Harris argues that the differences in religious doctrines and scriptures are the main indicators of a religion's value.

Harris has often noted some positive aspects of Buddhist thought, especially in relation to meditation, such as Buddhism's emphasis that one's behavior and intentions impact the mind, and in order to achieve happiness, one needs to strive towards "overcoming fear and hatred" while "maximizing love and compassion". In 2019, while discussing his book Waking Up: Searching for Spirituality Without Religion, Harris noted that the West could learn a lot from the East about the traditions of meditation found in Hinduism and Buddhism, though he considers that meditation can be practiced without any traditional religious beliefs.

Harris emphasizes that all religions are not the same and that if any religion can be considered a "religion of peace", it is not Islam, but rather Jainism, which emerged in India around the same time as Buddhism, and has non-violence as its core doctrine. He underscores that to be a practicing Jain, one has to be a vegetarian and a pacifist, while the Jain monks even wear masks in order to avoid breathing in any living thing. He argues that even the Jain religion has its problems, as Jains believe certain things based on insufficient evidence, which leads to some religious dogmas. Harris has participated in numerous debates on religion including with Robert Wright, Andrew Sullivan David Wolpe, Reza Aslan, and Jordan Peterson. In 2010, Harris joined Michael Shermer to debate with Deepak Chopra and Jean Houston on the future of God in a debate hosted by ABC News Nightline.

==== Christianity ====
Harris is critical of the Christian right in politics in the United States, blaming them for the political focus on "pseudo-problems like gay marriage". He has described Christian philosophical arguments for the existence of God such as the Leap of faith and Pascal's wager which were developed by Blaise Pascal and Søren Kierkegaard as "epistemological Ponzi schemes". He is also critical of liberal Christianity – as represented, for instance, by the theology of Paul Tillich – which he argues claims to base its beliefs on the Bible despite actually being influenced by secular modernity. He further states that in so doing liberal Christianity provides rhetorical cover to fundamentalists.

Harris is highly critical of the Catholic Church, saying that "The Catholic Church is more concerned about preventing contraception than preventing child rape". In May 2010, Harris along with Richard Dawkins, Christopher Hitchens, and Harris's foundation Project Reason called for the end of the Vatican's “diplomatic immunity" citing the numerous allegations of sexual abuse against the Catholic Church and its tolerance of such abuse. In April 2007, Harris debated with evangelical pastor Rick Warren for Newsweek magazine. Harris debated with Christian philosopher William Lane Craig in April 2011 on whether there can be an objective morality without God.

==== Islam ====
In 2006, Harris described Islam as "all fringe and no center", and wrote in The End of Faith that "the doctrine of Islam ... represents a unique danger to all of us", arguing that the war on terror is really a war against Islam. In 2007, Harris in the famous "Four Horsemen" debate asked fellow atheists, Hitchens, Dawkins, and Dennett, "Do you feel there's any burden we have, as critics of religion, to be evenhanded in our criticism of religion? Or is it fair to notice that there's a spectrum of religious ideas and commitments and Islam is on one end of it and the Amish and the Jains and others are on another end, and there are real differences here that we have to take seriously?"

In 2014, Harris said he considers Islam to be "especially belligerent and inimical to the norms of civil discourse", as it involves what Harris considers to be "bad ideas, held for bad reasons, leading to bad behavior." In 2015 Harris and secular Islamic activist Maajid Nawaz cowrote Islam and the Future of Tolerance. In this book, Harris argues that the word Islamophobia is a "pernicious meme", a label which prevents discussion about the threat of Islam. Harris has been described in 2020 by Jonathan Matusitz, Associate Professor at the University of Central Florida, as "a champion of the counter-jihad left". In 2017, Harris opposed Executive Order 13769, which limited the entry of refugees from Muslim-majority countries to the United States, stating that it was "unethical with regard to the plight of refugees ... and bound to be ineffective in stopping the spread of Islamism".

Since the October 7, 2023, attacks, his rhetoric has become more urgent, stating that several European countries admitted more migrants than they could successfully integrate, creating parallel communities and increasing tensions over issues such as free speech, women's rights, antisemitism, and religious extremism. His emphasis has shifted toward screening for commitment to liberal democratic values rather than religion itself. Harris argues that Europe underestimated the spread of Islamism and that political leaders have often been unwilling to discuss the issue honestly for fear of being accused of prejudice. He links this reluctance to the growth of populist and far-right movements.

===== Accusations of Islamophobia =====
Harris has been accused of Islamophobia by linguist and political commentator Noam Chomsky. After Harris and Chomsky exchanged a series of emails on terrorism and U.S. foreign policy in 2015, Chomsky said Harris had not prepared adequately for the exchange and that this revealed his work as unserious. In a 2016 interview with Al Jazeera English's UpFront, Chomsky further criticized Harris, saying he "specializes in hysterical, slanderous charges against people he doesn't like". Other writers and political commentators including Glenn Greenwald, Sam Seder, Reza Aslan, Chris Hedges, and Nathan J. Robinson have also accused Harris of Islamophobia and/or bigotry. Hedges and Robinson have also criticized Harris for discussing in an excerpt from The End of Faith the possibility of a nuclear first strike against an Islamist regime that would have acquired long-range nuclear weapons and that would be undeterred by the threat of mutual destruction due to beliefs in jihad and martyrdom.

Harris has countered that his views on this and other topics are frequently misrepresented by "unethical critics" who "deliberately" take his words out of context. He has also criticized the validity of the term "Islamophobia". Following a disagreement with actor Ben Affleck in October 2014 on the show Real Time with Bill Maher, he wrote: "My criticism of Islam is a criticism of beliefs and their consequences, but my fellow liberals reflexively view it as an expression of intolerance toward people", Affleck had described Harris's and host Bill Maher's views on Muslims as "gross" and "racist", and Harris's statement that "Islam is the mother lode of bad ideas" as an "ugly thing to say". Affleck also compared Harris's and Maher's rhetoric to that of people who use antisemitic canards or define African-Americans in terms of intraracial crime. Several American conservative media pundits in turn criticized Affleck and praised Harris and Maher for broaching the topic, saying that discussing it had become taboo.

Harris's dialogue on Islam with Maajid Nawaz received positive reviews, as well as mixed reviews. Irshad Manji wrote that their "back-and-forth clarifies multiple confusions that plague the public conversation about Islam". Of Harris specifically, she said "[he] is right that liberals must end their silence about the religious motives behind much Islamist terror. At the same time, he ought to call out another double-standard that feeds the liberal reflex to excuse Islamists: Atheists do not make nearly enough noise about hatred toward Muslims".

=== Spirituality ===
Harris holds that there is "nothing irrational about seeking the states of mind that lie at the core of many religions. Compassion, awe, devotion, and feelings of oneness are surely among the most valuable experiences a person can have", saying:

Everything of value that people get from religion can be had more honestly, without presuming anything on insufficient evidence. The rest is self-deception, set to music.

— Sam Harris (15 March 2007), SamHarris.org

Harris rejects the dichotomy between spirituality and rationality, favoring a middle path that preserves spirituality and science but does not involve religion. He writes that spirituality should be understood in light of scientific disciplines like neuroscience and psychology. Science, he contends, can show how to maximize human well-being, but may fail to answer certain questions about the nature of being, answers to some of which he says are discoverable directly through our experience. His conception of spirituality does not involve a belief in any god.

In Waking Up: A Guide to Spirituality Without Religion (2014), Harris describes his experience with Dzogchen, a Tibetan Buddhist meditation practice, and recommends it to his readers. He writes that the purpose of spirituality (as he defines it – he concedes that the term's uses are diverse and sometimes indefensible) is to become aware that our sense of self is illusory, and says this realization brings both happiness and insight into the nature of consciousness, mirroring core Buddhist beliefs. This process of realization, he argues, is based on experience and is not contingent on faith.

When you learn how to meditate, you recognize that there is another possibility, which is to be vividly aware of your experience in each moment in a way that frees you from routine misery.

— Sam Harris (February 2019), The Guardian

=== Science and morality ===
Harris considers that the well-being of conscious creatures forms the basis of morality. In The Moral Landscape, he argues that science can in principle answer moral questions and help maximize well-being. Harris also criticizes cultural and moral relativism, arguing that it prevents people from making objective moral judgments about practices that clearly harm human well-being, such as female genital mutilation. Harris contends that we can make scientifically based claims about the negative impacts of such practices on human welfare, and that withholding judgment in these cases is tantamount to claiming complete ignorance about what contributes to human well-being.

=== Free will ===
Harris says that the idea of free will "cannot be mapped on to any conceivable reality" and is incoherent. Harris writes in Free Will that neuroscience "reveals you to be a biochemical puppet". Philosopher Daniel Dennett argued that Harris's book Free Will successfully refuted the common understanding of free will, but that he failed to respond adequately to the compatibilist understanding of free will. Dennett said the book was valuable because it expressed the views of many eminent scientists, but that it nonetheless contained a "veritable museum of mistakes" and that "Harris and others need to do their homework if they want to engage with the best thought on the topic."

=== Artificial intelligence ===
Harris is particularly concerned with existential risks from artificial general intelligence, a topic he has discussed in depth in several episodes of his podcast. In a 2016 TED talk, he argued that it will be a major threat in the future, and criticized the lack of human interest on the subject. He said that artificial superintelligence will inevitably be developed if three assumptions hold true: intelligence is a product of information processing in physical systems, humans will continue to improve intelligent machines, and human intelligence is far from the peak of possible intelligence. He described making artificial superintelligence safe as "one of the greatest challenges our species will ever face", indicating that it would warrant immediate consideration.

== Political views ==
Harris describes himself as a liberal. He is a registered Democrat, and has never voted Republican in presidential elections. He supports same-sex marriage and decriminalizing drugs. (Note: Harris, Sam (September 18, 2006). "Head-in-the-Sand Liberals: Western civilization really is at risk from Muslim extremists." Los Angeles Times. Archived at the Wayback Machine.)

=== Criticism of the George W. Bush administration ===
Harris frequently criticized George W. Bush over his support for intelligent design and his coziness with Christianity. In an op-ed for the Los Angeles Times in 2006, Harris said that he supported most of the criticism against the Bush administration's war in Iraq, and all criticism of fiscal policy and the administration's treatment of science. Harris also said that liberalism has grown "dangerously out of touch with the realities of our world" regarding threats posed by Islamic fundamentalism. Harris criticized the Bush administration for its use of torture at Abu Ghraib and Guantánamo Bay, but also argued that there can be a rational case for torture in rare circumstances.

=== Israel ===
Harris opposes religious claims to Israel's right to exist as a Jewish state. Nonetheless, Harris has said that, due to the hostility towards Jews, if there is one religious group that needs protections in the form of a state, it is Jews and the state of Israel. Harris has criticized both Israel Defense Forces (IDF) and Hamas for committing war crimes in the Israeli–Palestinian conflict. He said in 2014 that he believes Israel genuinely wants peace and that its neighbors are more devoted to the destruction of Israel. Harris has also said that Hamas is more guilty than the IDF with regard to war crimes citing Hamas' use of human shields and genocidal rhetoric towards the Jews. He names these as reasons that Israel has a right to defend itself against Hamas.

During the Gaza war that began in October 2023, Harris expressed support for Israel. He rejected arguments that Israel provoked Hamas by building Israeli settlements in the West Bank, arguing that all Israelis left Gaza in 2005, leaving it to govern itself. He also condemned the October 7 attacks, which led to the war. In the essay "5 Myths about Israel and the War in Gaza", published on his blog in January 2024, Harris argued against five claims that he said are often used to criticize Israel and to defend Hamas during the war in Gaza. He argued that pacifism cannot work against an enemy as fanatical as Hamas, comparing this to his view that the Allies could not have stopped Nazi Germany through restraint. He also looked closely at the idea of "collateral damage", drawing a line between Israeli forces killing civilians by accident during urban warfare and what he described as Hamas deliberately torturing and brutally killing innocent people.

Harris described his July 2, 2024 interview with former Knesset member Michal Cotler-Wunsh as discussing "the bias against Israel at the United Nations, the nature of double standards, the precedent set by Israel in its conduct in the war in Gaza, the shapeshifting quality of antisemitism, anti-Zionism as the newest strain of Jew hatred, the 'Zionism is racism' resolution at the UN, the lie that Israel is an apartheid state, the notion that Israel is perpetrating a 'genocide' against the Palestinians, the Marxist oppressed-oppressor narrative, the false moral equivalence between the atrocities committed by Hamas and the deaths of noncombatants in Gaza ...." In July 2025, Harris wrote that despite his support for the war he has some reservations regarding his support for Israel citing allegations of corruption against Benjamin Netanyahu and the influence of religious extremists on the Israeli government.

In June 2025, Harris supported Operation Midnight Hammer, which authorized military strikes against Iran nuclear facilities amid the ongoing Iran–Israel war. After the launch of the 2026 Iran war, he expressed support for trying to overthrow the Iranian regime, but said that the Trump administration repeatedly lied and had not properly prepared for the potential harmful outcomes of the war (such as Iran becoming a failed state or the strait of Hormuz being closed), also expressing concern about the number of civilians that had been killed.

=== Presidential elections ===
In the 2008 United States presidential election, Harris supported the candidacy of Barack Obama and opposed Republican John McCain's candidacy. During the 2016 United States presidential election, Harris supported Hillary Clinton in the Democratic Party presidential primaries against Bernie Sanders, and despite calling her "a terribly flawed candidate for the presidency", he favored her in the general election and came out strongly in opposition to Donald Trump's candidacy. (Note: Harris, Sam. Trump in Exile. samharris.org, October 13, 2016. Retrieved April 22, 2017) Harris has criticized Trump for lying, stating in 2018 that Trump "has assaulted truth more than anyone in human history".

In the 2020 United States presidential election, Harris supported Andrew Yang in the Democratic primaries. Harris also introduced Yang to podcaster Joe Rogan. After the 2020 election, he said that he did not care what was on Hunter Biden's laptop, telling the Triggernometry podcast that "Hunter Biden literally could have had the corpses of children in his basement – I would not have cared", arguing more broadly that both Trump and Biden had been in the public eye for decades, and that Biden would have had to have engaged in an extraordinarily large scale of mendacity to come even close to the level of scandal Trump is known to have engaged in.

In the 2024 United States presidential election, Harris endorsed Kamala Harris. Just a few days before the elections, he joined in a debate on the Honestly podcast where he argued in favor of supporting Kamala Harris, while Ben Shapiro presented the case for Trump. After Kamala Harris lost the election, he blamed Democrats for their embrace of identity politics, gender identity, and the Biden administration for poor handling of immigration at the southern border.

=== Economics ===
Harris supports raising taxes on the wealthy and reducing government spending, and has criticized billionaires like Bill Gates and Warren Buffett for paying relatively little in tax. He has proposed taxing 10% for estates worth above 10 million dollars, taxing 50% for estates worth over a billion dollars, and then using the money to fund an infrastructure bank. He has accused conservatives of perceiving raising taxes as a form of theft or punishment, and of believing that by being rich they create value for others. He has described this view as ludicrous, saying that "markets aren't perfectly reflective of the value of goods and services, and many wealthy people don't create much in the way of value for others. In fact, as our recent financial crisis has shown, it is possible for a few people to become extraordinarily rich by wrecking the global economy".

=== Gun rights ===
Harris owns guns and wrote in 2013 that he understood people's hostility towards gun culture in the United States and the political influence of the National Rifle Association of America. However, he argued that there is a rational case for gun ownership as the police may not arrive in time. Harris disagreed with an assault weapons ban, which he described as mostly symbolic, arguing that only 3% of murders in the US were committed with rifles of any type, compared to 47% with handguns. Harris also said that the "liberal media" gets many things wrong about guns; however, he offered support for certain regulations on gun ownership, such as mandatory training, licensure, and background checks before a gun can be legally purchased.

=== COVID-19 pandemic ===
During the COVID-19 pandemic, Harris criticized commentators for pushing views on COVID-19 that he considered to be "patently insane". Harris accused these commentators of believing that COVID-19 policies were a way of implementing social control and to crackdown on people's freedom politically. Harris has feuded with Bret Weinstein over his views on COVID-19. In 2023, he said that if COVID-19 had killed more children, there would be no patience for vaccine skepticism. In March 2023, he hosted Matt Ridley and Alina Chan on his podcast to discuss the origins of COVID-19 and the potential that the COVID-19 virus was made in a lab.

=== Intellectual dark web ===
Harris has been described, alongside others such as Joe Rogan, Bret Weinstein, and Jordan Peterson, as a member of the intellectual dark web, a group that opposes political correctness and identity politics. In an essay for The New York Times, Bari Weiss described the group as "a collection of iconoclastic thinkers, academic renegades, and media personalities who are having a rolling conversation – on podcasts, YouTube and Twitter, and in sold-out auditoriums – that sound unlike anything else happening, at least publicly, in the culture right now." Hatewatch staff at the Southern Poverty Law Center (SPLC) wrote that members of the "skeptics" movement, of which Harris is "one of the most public faces", help to "channel people into the alt-right". Weiss wrote that the SPLC had misrepresented Harris's views.

In November 2020, Harris stated that he does not identify as a part of that group. In 2021, Harris stated that he had "turn[ed] in [his] imaginary membership card to this imaginary organization". In 2023 during an interview with The Daily Beast, Harris explained that he had broken away from the intellectual dark web due to disagreements with Weinstein, and Maajid Nawaz's "obsession" with COVID-19 conspiracy theories and criticism of COVID-19 policies. He also described becoming disenchanted with Dave Rubin for having been captured by his audience and said, "Rubin became far more cynical than I would have thought possible. And it's very depressing. He was a friend, he's not a friend anymore."

== Reception and recognition ==
Harris's first two books, in which he lays out his criticisms of religion, received negative reviews from Christian scholars. From secular sources, the books received several negative reviews, as well as positive ones. In his review of The End of Faith, American historian Alexander Saxton criticized what he called Harris's "vitriolic and selective polemic against Islam", (emphasis in original) which he said "obscure[s] the obvious reality that the invasion of Iraq and the War against Terror are driven by religious irrationalities, cultivated and conceded to, at high policy levels in the U.S., and which are at least comparable to the irrationality of Islamic crusaders and Jihadists". By contrast, Stephanie Merritt wrote of the same book that Harris's "central argument in The End of Faith is sound: Religion is the only area of human knowledge in which it is still acceptable to hold beliefs dating from antiquity and a modern society should subject those beliefs to the same principles that govern scientific, medical or geographical inquiry - particularly if they are inherently hostile to those with different ideas". Harris's first book, The End of Faith (2004), won the PEN/Martha Albrand Award for First Nonfiction.

Harris's next two books, which discuss philosophical issues relating to ethics and free will, received several negative academic reviews. In his review of The Moral Landscape, neuroscientist Kenan Malik criticized Harris for not engaging adequately with philosophical literature: "Imagine a sociologist who wrote about evolutionary theory without discussing the work of Darwin, Fisher, Mayr, Hamilton, Trivers, or Dawkins on the grounds that he did not come to his conclusions by reading about biology and because discussing concepts such as 'adaptation', 'speciation', 'homology', 'phylogenetics', or 'kin selection' would 'increase the amount of boredom in the universe'. How seriously would we, and should we, take his argument?". On the other hand, The Moral Landscape received a largely-positive review from psychologists James Diller and Andrew Nuzzolilli. Additionally, Free Will received a mixed academic review from philosopher Paul Pardi, who said that while it suffers from some conceptual confusions and that the core argument is a bit too "breezy", it serves as a "good primer on key ideas in physicalist theories of freedom and the will".

Harris's book on spirituality and meditation received positive reviews, as well as some mixed reviews. It was praised by Frank Bruni, for example, who described it as "so entirely of this moment, so keenly in touch with the growing number of Americans who are willing to say that they do not find the succor they crave, or a truth that makes sense to them, in organized religion." In April 2017, Harris hosted the social scientist Charles Murray on his podcast, discussing topics including the heritability of IQ and race and intelligence. Harris stated the invitation was out of indignation at a violent protest against Murray at Middlebury College the month before and not out of particular interest in the material at hand. The podcast episode garnered significant criticism, most notably from Vox and Slate. In the Vox article, scientists, including Eric Turkheimer, Kathryn Paige Harden, and Richard E. Nisbett, accused Harris of participating in "pseudoscientific racialist speculation" and peddling "junk science". Harris and Murray were defended by commentators Andrew Sullivan and Kyle Smith. Harris and Vox editor-at-large Ezra Klein later discussed the affair in a podcast interview in which Klein accused Harris of "thinking tribally" and Harris accused the Vox article of leading people to think he was racist.

In 2018, Robert Wright, a visiting professor of science and religion at Union Theological Seminary, published an article in Wired criticizing Harris, whom he described as "annoying" and "deluded". Wright wrote that Harris, despite claiming to be a champion of rationality, ignored his own cognitive biases and engaged in faulty and inconsistent arguments in his book The End of Faith. He wrote that "the famous proponent of New Atheism is on a crusade against tribalism but seems oblivious to his own version of it". Wright wrote that these biases are rooted in natural selection and impact everyone, but that they can be mitigated when acknowledged. The UK Business Insider included Harris's podcast in their list of "8 podcasts that will change how you think about human behavior" in 2017, and PC Magazine included it in their list of "The Best Podcasts of 2018". In January 2020, Max Sanderson included Harris's podcast as a "Producer pick" in a "podcasts of the week" section for The Guardian. The Waking Up podcast won the 2017 Webby Award for "People's Voice" in the category "Science & Education" under "Podcasts & Digital Audio". Harris was included on a list of the "100 Most Spiritually Influential Living People 2019" in the Watkins Review, a publication of Watkins Books, a London esoterica bookshop. He was selected to receive the 2026 Richard Dawkins Award from the Center for Inquiry.

== Personal life ==
In 2004, Harris married Annaka Harris (née Gorton), an author and editor of nonfiction and scientific books, after engaging in a common interest about the nature of consciousness. They have two daughters and live in Los Angeles. In September 2020, Harris became a member of Giving What We Can, an effective altruism organization whose members pledge to give at least 10% of their income to effective charities, both as an individual and as a company with Waking Up. Harris practiced Brazilian jiu-jitsu.

== Works ==
=== Books ===
- Harris, Sam (2004). The End of Faith: Religion, Terror, and the Future of Reason. W.W. Norton & Company. ISBN 0-393-03515-8. OCLC 62265386.
- Harris, Sam (2006). Letter to a Christian Nation. Alfred A. Knopf, Inc. ISBN 0-307-26577-3. OCLC 70158553.
- Harris, Sam (2010). The Moral Landscape: How Science Can Determine Human Values. Free Press. ISBN 978-1-4391-7121-9. OCLC 535493357.
- Harris, Sam (2011). Lying. Four Elephants Press. ISBN 978-1-940051-00-0.
- Harris, Sam (2012). Free Will. Free Press. ISBN 978-1-4516-8340-0.
- Harris, Sam (2014a). Waking Up: A Guide to Spirituality Without Religion. Simon & Schuster. ISBN 978-1-4516-3601-7.
- Harris, Sam; Nawaz, Maajid (2015). Islam and the Future of Tolerance: A Dialogue. Harvard University Press. ISBN 978-0-674-08870-2.
- Harris, Sam; Dawkins, Richard; Dennett, Daniel; Hitchens, Christopher (2019). The Four Horsemen: The Discussion that Sparked an Atheist Revolution. Bantam Press. ISBN 978-0-593-08039-9.
- Harris, Sam (2020). Making Sense: Conversations on Consciousness, Morality, and the Future of Humanity. Ecco. ISBN 978-0-06-285778-1.

=== Documentary ===
- Amila, D. & Shapiro, J. (2018). Islam and the Future of Tolerance. United States: The Orchard.
- Musk (dir. Alex Gibney, 2026)

=== Peer-reviewed articles ===
- Harris, S.; Sheth, S. A.; Cohen, M. S. (February 27, 2008). "Functional neuroimaging of belief, disbelief, and uncertainty". Annals of Neurology. 63 (2): 141–147. doi:10.1002/ana.21301. PMID 18072236. S2CID 17335600.
- Harris, S.; Kaplan, J. T.; Curiel, A.; Bookheimer, S. Y.; Iacoboni, M.; Cohen, M. S. (October 1, 2009). Sporns, Olaf (ed.). "The Neural Correlates of Religious and Nonreligious Belief". PLOS One. 4 (10) e7272. Bibcode:2009PLoSO...4.7272H. doi:10.1371/journal.pone.0007272. PMC 2748718. PMID 19794914.
- Douglas, P. K.; Harris, S.; Yuille, A.; Cohen, M. S. (May 15, 2011). "Performance comparison of machine learning algorithms and number of independent components used in fMRI decoding of belief vs. disbelief". NeuroImage. 56 (2): 544–553. doi:10.1016/j.neuroimage.2010.11.002. PMC 3099263. PMID 21073969.
- Kaplan, Jonas T.; Gimbel, Sarah I.; Harris, Sam (December 23, 2016). "Neural correlates of maintaining one's political beliefs in the face of counterevidence". Scientific Reports. 6 39589. Bibcode:2016NatSR...639589K. doi:10.1038/srep39589. PMC 5180221. PMID 28008965.
- Seitz, Benjamin M.; Aktipis, Athena; Buss, David M.; Alcock, Joe; Bloom, Paul; Gelfand, Michele; Harris, Sam; Lieberman, Debra; Horowitz, Barbara N.; Pinker, Steven; Wilson, David Sloan; Haselton, Martie G. (November 10, 2020). "The pandemic exposes human nature: 10 evolutionary insights". Proceedings of the National Academy of Sciences. 117 (45): 27767–27776. Bibcode:2020PNAS..11727767S. doi:10.1073/pnas.2009787117. ISSN 0027-8424. PMC 7668083. PMID 33093198.
