= The Moral Landscape =

2010 book by Sam Harris

The Moral Landscape: How Science Can Determine Human Values
- Author: Sam Harris
- Language: English
- Subjects: Morality, science, humanism, personism
- Published: 2010
- Publisher: Free Press
- Publication place: United States
- Media type: Print (hardcover and paperback)
- Pages: 322
- ISBN: 978-1-4391-7121-9
- OCLC: 535493357
- Preceded by: Letter to a Christian Nation
- Followed by: Lying

The Moral Landscape: How Science Can Determine Human Values is a 2010 book by Sam Harris, in which he promotes a science of morality and argues that many thinkers have long confused the relationship between morality, facts, and science. He aims to carve a third path between secularists who say morality is subjective (moral relativists) and religionists who say that morality is dictated by God and scripture.

Harris contends that the only viable moral framework is one where "morally good" things pertain to increases in the "well-being of conscious creatures". He then argues that, problems with philosophy of science and reason in general notwithstanding, moral questions have objectively right and wrong answers grounded in empirical facts about what causes people to flourish. Challenging the traditional philosophical notion that an "ought" cannot follow from an "is" (Hume's law), Harris argues that moral questions are best pursued using not just philosophy, but the methods of science, because science can tell us which values lead to human flourishing. It is in this sense that Harris advocates that scientists begin conversations about a normative science of morality.

Publication of the book followed Harris's 2009 receipt of a Ph.D. in cognitive neuroscience from the University of California, Los Angeles with a similarly titled thesis: The Moral Landscape: How Science Could Determine Human Values.

== Synopsis ==
Harris's case starts with two premises: "(1) some people have better lives than others, and (2) these differences are related, in some lawful and not entirely arbitrary way, to states of the human brain and to states of the world". The idea is that a person is simply describing material facts (many about their brain) when they describe possible "better" and "worse" lives for themselves. Granting this, Harris says we must conclude that there are facts about which courses of action will allow one to pursue a better life.

Harris emphasizes the importance of admitting that such facts exist, because he says this logic also applies to groups of people. He suggests there are better and worse ways for societies to pursue better lives. Just as for an individual, there may be multiple different paths and "peaks" to flourishing for societies—and many more ways to fail.

Harris then makes a case that science can usefully define morality using facts about people's well-being. His arguments acknowledge that problems with this scientific definition of morality seem to be problems shared by all science, or reason and words in general. Harris also spends some time describing how science might engage nuances and challenges of identifying the best ways for individuals and groups to improve their lives. Many of these issues are covered below.

=== Philosophical case ===
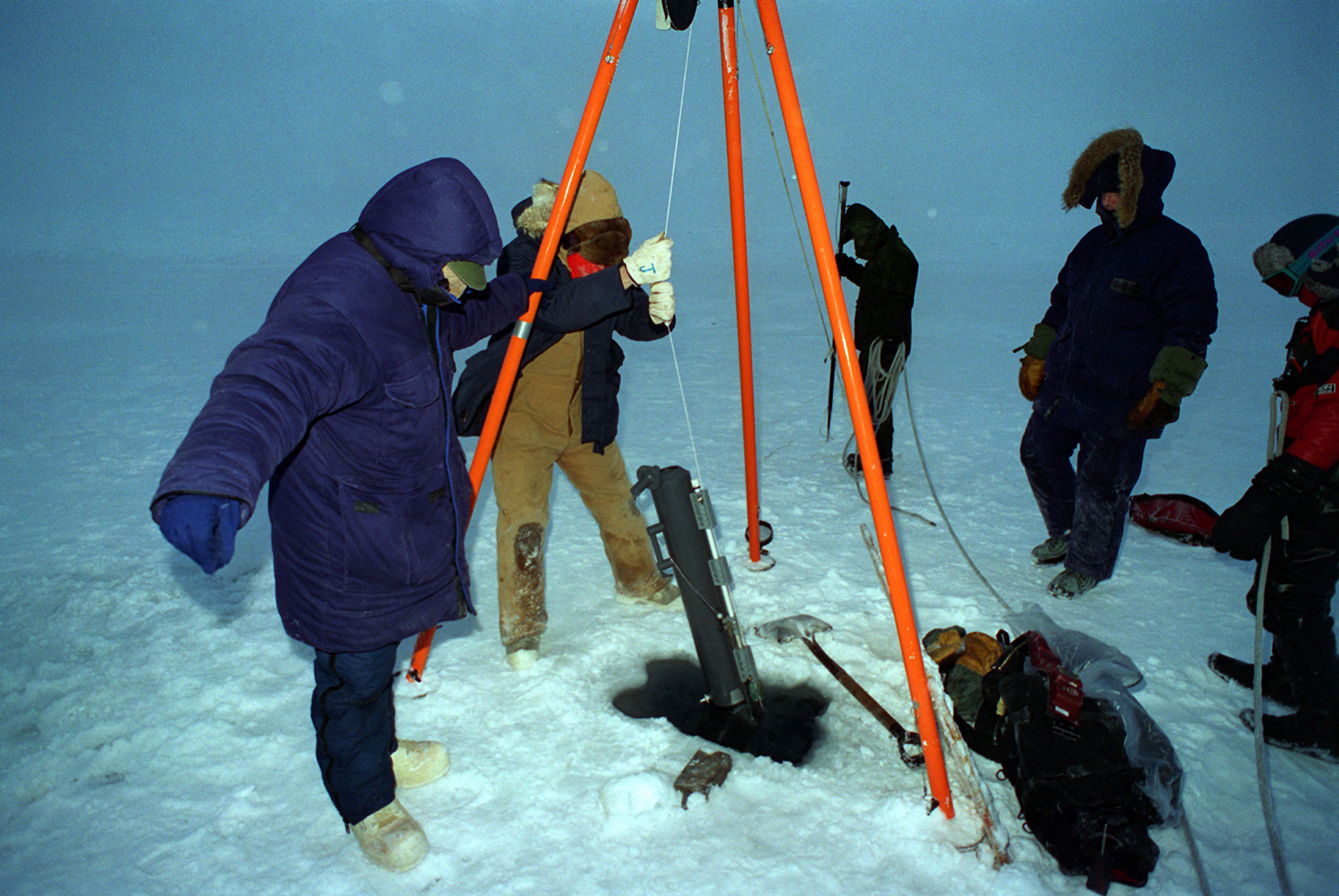
Harris says science requires that one acknowledge certain values (e.g. curiosity)

Although Harris's book discusses the challenges that a science of morality must face, he also mentions that his scientific argument is indeed philosophical. Furthermore, he says that this is the case for almost all scientific investigation. He mentions that modern science amounts to careful practice of accepted first philosophical principles like empiricism and physicalism. He also suggests that science has already very much settled on values in answering the question "what should I believe, and why should I believe it?". Harris says it should not be surprising that normative ethical sciences are, or would be, similarly founded on bedrock assumptions (basic norms). Harris says:

...science is often a matter of philosophy in practice. It is probably worth recalling that the original name for the physical sciences was, in fact, 'natural philosophy'... One could call [my proposal in The Moral Landscape] a 'philosophical' position, but it is one that directly relates to the boundaries of science.

The way he thinks science might engage moral issues draws on various philosophical positions like ethical realism (there are moral facts), and ethical naturalism (these facts relate to the physical world). Harris says a science of morality may resemble utilitarianism, but that the science is, importantly, more open-ended because it involves an evolving definition of well-being. Rather than committing to reductive materialism, then, Harris recognizes the arguments of revisionists that psychological definitions themselves are contingent on research and discoveries. Harris adds that any science of morality must consider everything from emotions and thoughts to the actual actions and their consequences.

For Harris, moral propositions, and explicit values in general, are concerned with the flourishing of conscious creatures in a society. He argues, "Social morality exists to sustain cooperative social relationships, and morality can be objectively evaluated by that standard." Harris sees some philosophers' talk of strictly private morality as akin to unproductive discussion of a private, personal physics. "If philosophers want to only talk about some bizarrely unnatural private morality, they are just changing the subject".

Harris also discusses how interchangeability of perspective might emerge as an important part of moral reasoning. He alludes to an "unpleasant surprise principle", where someone realizes they have been supporting an ineffective moral norm (e.g. reported cases of Jew-hunting Nazis discovering that they themselves were of Jewish descent).

=== Science and moral truths ===
Harris identifies three projects for science as it relates to morality: (1) explaining why humans do what they do in the name of morality (e.g., traditional evolutionary psychology), (2) determining which patterns of thought and behavior humans should follow (the science of morality), and (3) generally persuading humans to change their ways. Harris says the first project focuses only on describing what is, whereas (2) and (3) focus on what should and could be, respectively. His point is that this second, prescriptive project should be the focus of a science of morality. He also says we should not fear an "Orwellian future" with scientists at every door: vital progress in the science of morality could be shared in much the same way as advances in medicine.

Harris says it is important to delineate project (1) from project (2), lest we commit a moralistic fallacy. He also highlights the importance of distinguishing between (2)—asking what is right—from (3)—trying to change behavior. He says we must realize that the nuances of human motivation are a challenge in themselves; people often fail to do what they "ought" to do, even to be successfully selfish: there is every reason to believe that discovering what is best for society would not change every member's habits overnight.

Harris does not imagine that people, even scientists, have always made the right moral decisions; indeed it is precisely his argument that many of them are wrong about moral facts. This is due to the many real challenges of good science in general, including human cognitive limitations and biases (e.g., loss aversion can sway human decisions on important issues like medicine). He mentions the research of Paul Slovic and others to describe just a few of these mental heuristics that can keep us from reasoning properly. Although he mentions that training might temper the influence of these biases, Harris worries about research showing that incompetence and ignorance in a domain leads to confidence (the Dunning–Kruger effect).

Harris explains that debates and disagreement are a part of the scientific method, and that one side can be wrong. He also says that the debates still available to science illustrate how much work can still be done, and how much conversation must continue.

=== Harris's positive beliefs ===
The book is full of issues Harris thinks are far from being morally gray areas. For instance, he references one poll that found that 36% of British Muslims think apostates should be put to death for their unbelief, and says that these people are "morally confused". He also suggests it is obvious that loneliness, helplessness, and poverty are bad, but that that is by no means as far as positive psychology has taken and will take us.

In one section, "The illusion of free will", Harris argues that there is a wealth of evidence in psychology (e.g. the illusion of introspection) or specifically related to the neuroscience of free will that suggests that metaphysically free will does not exist. This, he thinks, is intuitive; "trains of thought...convey the apparent reality of choices, freely made. But from a deeper perspective...thoughts simply arise (what else could they do?)". He adds, "The illusion of free will is itself an illusion". The implications of free will's nonexistence may be a working determinism, and Harris warns us not to confuse this with fatalism.

One implication of a determined will, Harris says, is that it becomes unreasonable to punish people out of retribution—only behaviour modification and the deterrence of others still seem to be potentially valid reasons to punish. This, especially because behaviour modification is a sort of cure for the evil behaviours; Harris provides a thought experiment:

Consider what would happen if we discovered a cure for human evil. Imagine, for the sake of argument...the cure for psychopathy can be put directly into the food supply like vitamin D...consider, for instance, the prospect of withholding the cure for evil from a murderer as part of his punishment. Would this make any moral sense at all?

Harris acknowledges a hierarchy of moral consideration (e.g., humans are more important than bacteria or mice). He says it follows that there could, in principle, be a species compared to which we are relatively unimportant (although he doubts such a species exists).

Harris supports the development of lie detection technology and believes it would be, on the whole, beneficial for humanity.

==== Religion: good or bad? ====
Consistent with Harris's definition of morality, he says we must ask whether religion increases human flourishing today (regardless of whether it increased it in the distant past). He argues that religions may be practiced largely because they fit well with human cognitive tendencies (e.g. animism). In Harris's view, religion and religious dogma is an impediment to reason, and he takes Francis Collins as an example.

Harris criticizes the tactics of secularists like Chris Mooney, who argue that science is not fundamentally (and certainly not superficially) in conflict with religion. Harris sees this as a patronizing attempt to pacify more devout theists. He claims that society can move away from deep dependence on religion just as it has from witchcraft, which he says was once just as deeply ingrained.

== Promotion ==
In advance of publication, four personal and professional acquaintances of the author offered their praise for the book, including biologist and science popularizer Richard Dawkins, novelist Ian McEwan, psycholinguist Steven Pinker, and theoretical physicist Lawrence Krauss. They each serve on the Advisory Board of Harris's Project Reason, and their praise appears as blurbs (released by the book's publisher on Harris's website and reproduced on the book's dust jacket). Dawkins said,

I was one of those who had unthinkingly bought into the hectoring myth that science can say nothing about morals. To my surprise, The Moral Landscape has changed all that for me. It should change it for philosophers too. Philosophers of mind have already discovered that they can't duck the study of neuroscience, and the best of them have raised their game as a result...".

McEwan wrote, "Harris breathes intellectual fire into an ancient debate. Reading this thrilling, audacious book, you feel the ground shifting beneath your feet. Reason has never had a more passionate advocate." Pinker said that Harris offers "a tremendously appealing vision, and one that no thinking person can afford to ignore." Krauss wrote that Harris "has the rare ability to frame arguments that are not only stimulating, they are downright nourishing, even if you don't always agree with him!" Krauss predicted that "readers are bound to come away with previously firm convictions about the world challenged, and a vital new awareness about the nature and value of science and reason in our lives."

== Reception ==
The Moral Landscape reached 9th in The New York Times Best Seller list for Hardcover Non-Fiction in October 2010.

=== Reviews and criticism ===
ECSU Associate Professor of Philosophy James W. Diller and Andrew E. Nuzzolilli wrote a generally favorable review in a journal of the Association for Behavior Analysis International:

The Moral Landscape represents an important contribution to a scientific discussion of morality. It explicates the determinants of moral behavior for a popular audience, placing causality in the external environment and in the organism's correlated neurological states.

In his review for Barnes & Noble, Cal State Associate Professor of Philosophy Troy Jollimore wrote that the book "has some good, reasonable, and at times persuasive things to say" to people who are unfamiliar with moral skepticism, but "has little to say to those people who actually do know what the arguments are, and it will not help others become much better informed." Jollimore also worried that Harris wrongly presents complex issues as having simple solutions.

Kwame Anthony Appiah wrote in The New York Times "when [Harris] stays closest to neuroscience, he says much that is interesting and important", but criticized Harris for failing to articulate "his central claim" and to identify how science has "revealed" that human well-being has an objective component. Appiah argued that Harris "ends up endorsing ... something very like utilitarianism, a philosophical position that is now more than two centuries old, ... that faces a battery of familiar problems", which Harris merely "push[es] ... aside." Harris responded to Appiah in the afterword of the paperback version, claiming that all of Appiah's criticisms are addressed in the chapter "Good and Evil".

Cognitive anthropologist Scott Atran criticized Harris for failing to engage with the philosophical literature on ethics and the problems in attempting to scientifically quantify human well-being, noting that

Nobel Prize-winner Daniel Kahneman studies what gives Americans pleasure—watching TV, talking to friends, having sex—and what makes them unhappy—commuting, working, looking after their children. So this leaves us where ... ?

Critiquing the book, Kenan Malik wrote:

Imagine a sociologist who wrote about evolutionary theory without discussing the work of Darwin, Fisher, Mayr, Hamilton, Trivers or Dawkins on the grounds that he did not come to his conclusions by reading about biology and because discussing concepts such as "adaptation", "speciation", "homology", "phylogenetics" or "kin selection" would "increase the amount of boredom in the universe". How seriously would we, and should we, take his argument?

David Sexton of the London Evening Standard described Harris's claim to provide a science of morality as "the most extraordinarily overweening claim and evidently flawed. Science does not generate its own moral values; it can be used for good or ill and has been. Harris cannot stand outside culture, and the 'better future' he prophesies is itself a cultural projection."

John Horgan, journalist for the Scientific American blog and author of The End of Science, wrote, "Harris further shows his arrogance when he claims that neuroscience, his own field, is best positioned to help us achieve a universal morality. ... Neuroscience can't even tell me how I can know the big, black, hairy thing on my couch is my dog Merlin. And we're going to trust neuroscience to tell us how we should resolve debates over the morality of abortion, euthanasia and armed intervention in other nations' affairs?"

Russell Blackford wrote, "The Moral Landscape is an ambitious work that will gladden the hearts, and strengthen the spines, of many secular thinkers" but that he nonetheless had "serious reservations" about the book.

The philosopher Simon Blackburn, reviewing the book, described Harris as "a knockabout atheist" who "joins the prodigious ranks of those whose claim to have transcended philosophy is just an instance of their doing it very badly", pointing out that "if Bentham's hedonist is in one brain state and Aristotle's active subject is in another, as no doubt they would be, it is a moral, not an empirical, problem to say which is to be preferred." And H. Allen Orr in The New York Review of Books wrote, "despite Harris's bravado about 'how science can determine human values,' The Moral Landscape delivers nothing of the kind."

Steve Isaacson wrote Mining The Moral Landscape: Why Science Does Not (and cannot) Determine Human Values. Isaacson concludes, "The largest objection to Harris' argument is still Moore's open-question argument. Harris dismisses the argument as a word game easily avoided, but he never explains the game nor how to avoid it. He just ignores it."

American novelist Marilynne Robinson, writing in The Wall Street Journal, asserted that Harris fails to "articulate a positive morality of his own" but, had he done so, would have found himself in the company of the "Unitarians, busily cooperating on schemes to enhance the world's well being, as they have been doing for generations."

At the Moving Naturalism Forward workshop, Nobel Prize-winning physicist Steven Weinberg described how in his youth he had been a utilitarian but had been dissuaded of the notion that "the fundamental principle that guides our actions should be the greatest happiness for the greatest number" by reading Aldous Huxley's Brave New World. Weinberg added, "Now, Sam Harris is aware of this kind of counter argument [to utilitarianism], and says it's not happiness, it's human welfare. Well, as you make things vaguer and vaguer, of course, it becomes harder and harder to say it doesn't fit your own moral feelings, but it also becomes less and less useful as a means of making moral judgements. You could take that to the extreme and make up some nonsense word and say that's the important thing and no one could refute it, but it wouldn't be very helpful. I regard human welfare and the way Sam Harris refers to it as sort of halfway in that direction to absolute nonsense."

=== Response to critics from Harris ===
A few months after the book's release, Harris wrote a follow-up at The Huffington Post responding to his critics.

On August 31, 2013, in response to the negative reviews of his book, Harris issued a public challenge for anyone to write an essay of less than 1,000 words rebutting the book's "central argument". The submissions were vetted by Russell Blackford, with the author of the essay judged best to receive $2,000, or $20,000 if they succeeded in changing Harris's mind. Four hundred twenty-four essays were received by the deadline. On March 11, 2014, Blackford announced the winning essay was by philosophy instructor Ryan Born.
