= Gene editing =

Gene editing may refer to:

- Genetic engineering of any organism by genome editing. Gene editing is the emerging molecular biology technique that makes very specific targeted changes by insertion, deletion or substitution of genetic material in an organism's DNA to obtain desired results. Examples of gene editing are CRISPR, zinc finger nuclease, transcription activator-like effector nuclease (TALEN), oligonucleotide directed mutagenesis + meganucleases.
- Genome editing, a type of genetic engineering
- Gene therapy, the therapeutic delivery of nucleic acid polymers into a patient's cells as a drug to treat disease
- CRISPR gene editing, a genetic engineering technique. CRISPR are termed as (site directed nucleases) SDN since they target a specific part of the genome. There are 3 different categories of SDN. SDN1 makes random mutations at the target site to repair the damaged host DNA without involving any foreign DNA. SDN2 uses small non coding homologous repair DNA to achieve a specific nucleotide sequence to repair the host DNA by (homology directed repair) HDR, which is a natural nucleic acid repair system. SDN3 uses a large stretch of protein coding donor DNA, which is targeted for insertion through HDR at a predefined genomic locus.
- TALEN editing, using transcription activator-like effector nucleases. TALENs are another type of genome editing tool. They work by using engineered proteins that can recognize and bind to specific DNA sequences, which then trigger a cut in the DNA. TALENs are less efficient than CRISPR/Cas9, but they are still a useful tool for genome editing.
- Zinc finger editing, using zinc finger nucleases
- Natural genetic engineering (NGE) has been proposed by molecular biologist James A. Shapiro to account for novelty created in the course of biological evolution.

== See also ==
- Genetic editing, an approach to scholarly editing of literary texts
