= The Portable Atheist =

2007 anthology

The Portable Atheist: Essential Readings for the Nonbeliever
- Editor: Christopher Hitchens
- Language: English
- Subject: Atheism
- Publisher: Da Capo Press
- Publication date: November 2007
- Publication place: United States
- Media type: Paperback, Audiobook
- ISBN: 978-0-306-81608-6
- OCLC: 156811900

The Portable Atheist: Essential Readings for the Nonbeliever (2007) is an anthology of atheist and agnostic thought edited by Christopher Hitchens.

Going back to the early Greeks, Hitchens introduces selected essays of past and present philosophers, scientists, and other thinkers such as Lucretius, Benedict de Spinoza, Percy Bysshe Shelley, Charles Darwin, Karl Marx, Mark Twain, George Eliot, Bertrand Russell, Emma Goldman, H. L. Mencken, Albert Einstein, Daniel Dennett, Sam Harris, Victor J. Stenger and Richard Dawkins − with original pieces by Salman Rushdie, Ian McEwan, and Ayaan Hirsi Ali.

For Hitchens, "religion invents a problem where none exists by describing the wicked as also made in "the image of god and the sexually nonconformist as existing in a state of incurable mortal sin that can incidentally cause floods and earthquakes". "The only position that leaves me with no cognitive dissonance is atheism. Death is certain ... Life on this earth, with all its mystery and beauty and pain, is then to be lived far more intensely: we stumble and get up, we are sad, confident, insecure, feel loneliness and joy and love. There is nothing more; but I want nothing more."

Hitchens dedicated the anthology to the memory of Primo Levi and prefaces the book with quotes from Levi's If This Is a Man and The Drowned and the Saved.

== Overview ==
For Hitchens, arguments for atheism can be divided into two main categories: those that dispute the existence of God and those that demonstrate the ill effects of religion. "Religion", he defines, "is, after all, more than the belief in a supreme being. It is the cult of that supreme being and the belief that his or her wishes have been made known or can be determined." He mentions great critics such as Thomas Jefferson and Thomas Paine, who perhaps paradoxically regarded religion as an insult to God.

"An agnostic does not believe in god, or disbelieve in him", writes Hitchens. Non-belief is not quite unbelief, he explains. "One is continually told, as an unbeliever", he writes, "that it is old-fashioned to rail against the primitive stupidities and cruelties of religion because after all, in these enlightened times, the old superstitions have died away. Nine times out of ten, one will be told not of some dogma of religious certitude but of some instance of charitable or humanitarian work undertaken by a religious person. Of course, this says nothing about the belief system involved." Hitchens points out that if Louis Farrakhan's Nation of Islam (NoI) succeeds in weaning young black men off narcotics, this would not alter the fact that the NoI is a racist crackpot organization. He reminds readers that Hamas – which publishes The Protocols of the Learned Elders of Zion on its website – won a reputation for its provision of social services. He challenges: which ethical statement made or which action performed by a believer could not have been made or performed by a non-believer?

=== Chapters ===
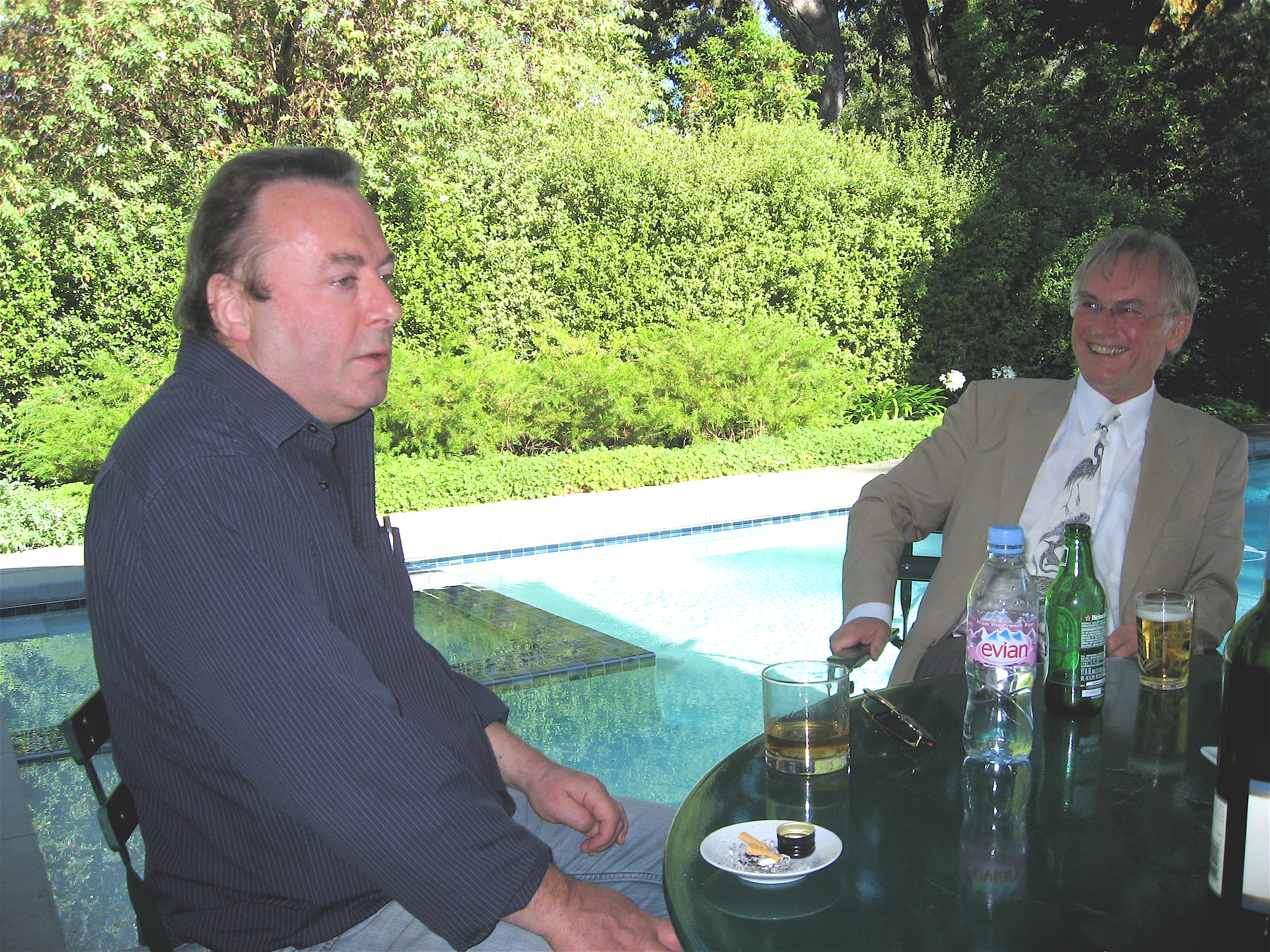
Hitchens and Richard Dawkins

1. Lucretius: De rerum natura (On the Nature of Things) – Books I, II, III, V, translation by W. Hannaford Brown
2. Omar Khayyám: Rubáiyát of Omar Khayyám: A Paraphrase from Several Literal Translations by Richard Le Gallienne
3. Thomas Hobbes: "Of Religion", from Leviathan
4. Benedict de Spinoza: Theological-Political Treatise
5. David Hume: "The Natural History of Religion", "Of Miracles"
6. James Boswell: "An Account of My Last Interview with David Hume, Esq."
7. Percy Bysshe Shelley: A Refutation of Deism
8. John Stuart Mill: "Moral Influences in My Early Youth", from Autobiography
9. Karl Marx: Contribution to the Critique of Hegel's Philosophy of Right
10. George Eliot: "Evangelical Teaching"
11. Charles Darwin: Autobiography
12. Leslie Stephen: "An Agnostic's Apology"
13. Anatole France: "Miracle" from Le Jardin d'Épicure
14. Mark Twain: "Thoughts of God", from Fables of Man; "Bible Teaching and Religious Practice", from Europe and Elsewhere and A Pen Warmed Up in Hell
15. Joseph Conrad: author's note to The Shadow-Line
16. Thomas Hardy: poem "God's Funeral"
17. Emma Goldman: "The Philosophy of Atheism"
18. H. P. Lovecraft: "A Letter on Religion"
19. Carl Van Doren: "Why I Am an Unbeliever" from Twelve Modern Apostles and Their Creeds
20. H. L. Mencken: "Memorial Service" from A Mencken Chrestomathy
21. Sigmund Freud: from The Future of an Illusion, translated and edited by James Strachey
22. Albert Einstein: Selected Writings on Religion
23. George Orwell: From A Clergyman's Daughter
24. John Betjeman: poem "In Westminster Abbey"
25. Chapman Cohen: "Monism and Religion" and "An Old Story" from Essays in Freethinking
26. Bertrand Russell: "An Outline of Intellectual Rubbish"
27. Philip Larkin: poems "Aubade" and "Church Going"
28. Martin Gardner: "The Wandering Jew and the Second Coming"
29. Carl Sagan: The Demon-Haunted World, and "The God Hypothesis" from The Varieties of Scientific Experience
30. John Updike: from Roger's Version
31. J. L. Mackie: "Conclusions and Implications", from The Miracle of Theism: Arguments for and against the Existence of God
32. Michael Shermer: "Genesis Revisited: A Scientific Creation Story"
33. A. J. Ayer: "That Undiscovered Country"
34. Daniel C. Dennett: "Thank Goodness!"
35. Charles Templeton: "A Personal Word" from A Farewell to God, and "Questions to Ask Yourself"
36. Richard Dawkins: "Why There Almost Certainly Is No God" from The God Delusion, "Gerin oil", and "Atheists for Jesus"
37. Victor Stenger: "Cosmic Evidence" from God: The Failed Hypothesis
38. Daniel C. Dennett: "A Working Definition of Religion" from Breaking Which Spell?
39. Elizabeth Anderson: "If God is Dead, Is Everything Permitted?"
40. Penn Jillette: "There Is No God"
41. Ian McEwan: "End of the World Blues" (original contribution)
42. Steven Weinberg: "What About God?" from Dreams of a Final Theory
43. Salman Rushdie: "'Imagine There's no Heaven': A Letter to the Six Billionth World Citizen" (updated and expanded)
44. Ibn Warraq: "The Koran" and "The Totalitarian Nature of Islam" from Why I Am Not a Muslim
45. Sam Harris: "In the Shadow of God", from The End of Faith
46. A. C. Grayling: "Can an Atheist Be a Fundamentalist?" from Against All Gods
47. Ayaan Hirsi Ali: How (and Why) I Became an Infidel (original contribution)

== Editorial reviews ==
Hitchens believes we will never cure ourselves of this belief in the divine and the only hope of salvation lies in "our contempt for our own weakness". At 500 pages this excellent anthology is only just portable, but it is the perfect Christmas stocking-filler for the atheist in your life.

— PD Smith, The Guardian
