= Teleological argument =

Argument for the existence of God

The teleological argument (from τέλος, telos, 'end, aim, goal'), also known as the physico-theological argument, argument from design, or intelligent design argument, is a rational argument for the existence of God or, more generally, that complex functionality in the natural world, which looks designed, is evidence of an intelligent creator. The earliest recorded versions of this argument are associated with Socrates in ancient Greece, although it has been argued that he was taking up an older argument. Later, Plato and Aristotle developed complex approaches to the proposal that the cosmos has an intelligent cause, but it was the Stoics during the Roman era who, under their influence, "developed the battery of creationist arguments broadly known under the label 'The Argument from Design'".

Since the Roman era, various versions of the teleological argument have been associated with the Abrahamic religions. In the Middle Ages, Islamic theologians such as Al-Ghazali used the argument, although it was rejected as unnecessary by Quranic literalists, and as unconvincing by many Islamic philosophers. Later, the teleological argument was accepted by Saint Thomas Aquinas, and included as the fifth of his "Five Ways" of proving the existence of God. In early modern England, clergymen such as William Turner and John Ray were well-known proponents. In the early 18th century, William Derham published his Physico-Theology, which gave his "demonstration of the being and attributes of God from his works of creation". Later, William Paley, in his 1802 Natural Theology or Evidences of the Existence and Attributes of the Deity published a prominent presentation of the design argument with his version of the watchmaker analogy and the first use of the phrase "argument from design".

From its beginning, there have been numerous criticisms of the different versions of the teleological argument. Some have been written as responses to criticisms of non-teleological natural science which are associated with it. Especially important were the general logical arguments presented by David Hume in his Dialogues Concerning Natural Religion, published in 1779, and the explanation of biological complexity given in Charles Darwin's Origin of Species, published in 1859. Since the 1960s, Paley's arguments have been influential in the development of a creation science movement which used phrases such as "design by an intelligent designer", and after 1987 this was rebranded as "intelligent design", promoted by the intelligent design movement which refers to an intelligent designer. Both movements have used the teleological argument to argue against the modern scientific understanding of evolution, and to claim that supernatural explanations should be given equal validity in the public school science curriculum.

Starting already in classical Greece, two approaches to the teleological argument developed, distinguished by their understanding of whether the natural order was literally created or not. The non-creationist approach starts most clearly with Aristotle, although many thinkers, such as the Neoplatonists, believed it was already intended by Plato. This approach is not creationist in a simple sense, because while it agrees that a cosmic intelligence is responsible for the natural order, it rejects the proposal that this requires a "creator" to physically make and maintain this order. The Neoplatonists did not find the teleological argument convincing, and in this they were followed by medieval philosophers such as Al-Farabi and Avicenna. Later, Averroes and Thomas Aquinas considered the argument acceptable, but not necessarily the best argument.

While the concept of an intelligence behind the natural order is ancient, a rational argument that concludes that we can know that the natural world has a designer, or a creating intelligence which has human-like purposes, appears to have begun with classical philosophy. Some of the modern arguments utilize findings from theory of relativity, quantum mechanics, the Big Bang, the theories of expansion, heat death, and fine-tuning of the universe. Religious thinkers in Judaism, Hinduism, Confucianism, Islam and Christianity also developed versions of the teleological argument. Later, variants on the argument from design were produced in Western philosophy and by Christian fundamentalism. Contemporary defenders of the teleological argument are mainly Christians, for example Richard Swinburne and John Lennox.

== Classical philosophy ==
=== Socrates and the pre-Socratics ===
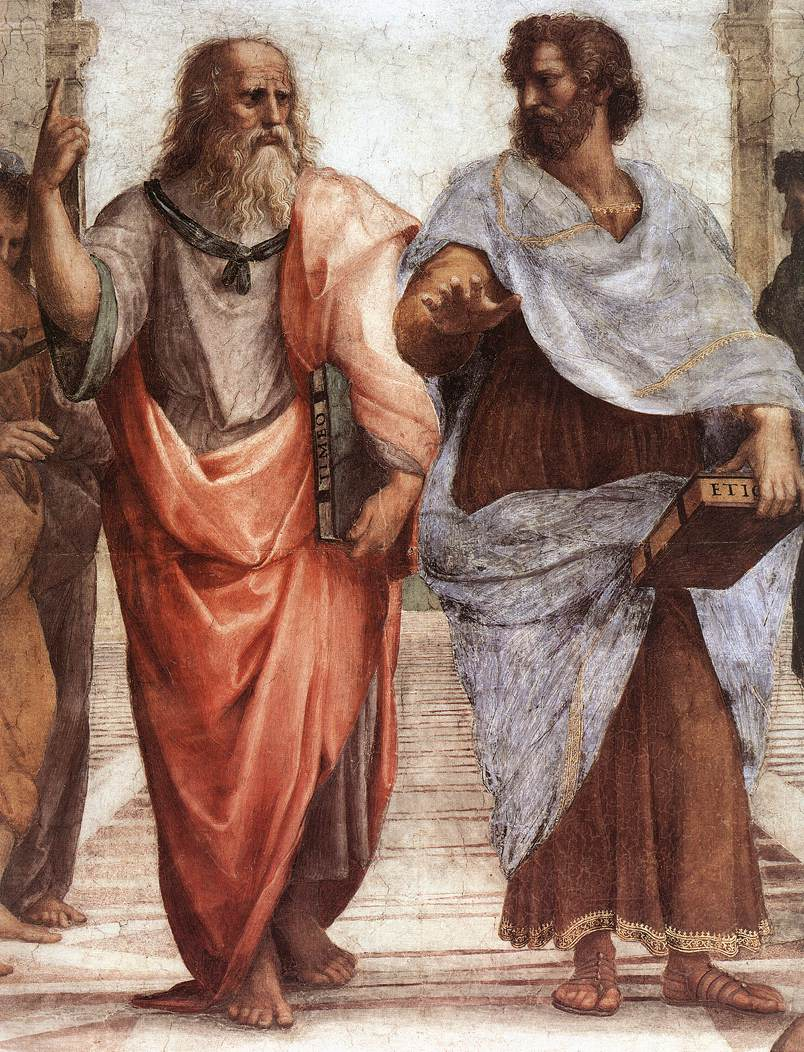
Plato and Aristotle, depicted here in The School of Athens, both developed philosophical arguments addressing the universe's apparent order (logos).

The argument from intelligent design appears to have begun with Socrates, although the concept of a cosmic intelligence is older and David Sedley has argued that Socrates was developing an older idea, citing Anaxagoras of Clazomenae, born about 500 BC, as a possible earlier proponent. The proposal that the order of nature showed evidence of having its own human-like "intelligence" goes back to the origins of Greek natural philosophy and science, and its attention to the orderliness of nature, often with special reference to the revolving of the heavens. Anaxagoras is the first person who is definitely known to have explained such a concept using the word "nous" (which is the original Greek term that leads to modern English "intelligence" via its Latin and French translations). Aristotle reports an earlier philosopher from Clazomenae named Hermotimus who had taken a similar position. Amongst Pre-Socratic philosophers before Anaxagoras, other philosophers had proposed a similar intelligent ordering principle causing life and the rotation of the heavens. For example Empedocles, like Hesiod much earlier, described cosmic order and living things as caused by a cosmic version of love, and Pythagoras and Heraclitus attributed the cosmos with "reason" (logos). In his Philebus 28c Plato has Socrates speak of this as a tradition, saying that "all philosophers agree—whereby they really exalt themselves—that mind (nous) is king of heaven and earth. Perhaps they are right." He later states that the ensuing discussion "confirms the utterances of those who declared of old that mind (nous) always rules the universe."

Xenophon's report in his Memorabilia might be the earliest clear account of an argument that there is evidence in nature of intelligent design. The word traditionally translated and discussed as "design" is gnōmē and Socrates is reported by Xenophon to have pressed doubting young men to look at things in the market, and consider whether they could tell which things showed evidence of gnōmē, and which seemed more to be by blind chance, and then to compare this to nature and consider whether it could be by blind chance. In Plato's Phaedo, Socrates is made to say just before dying that his discovery of Anaxagoras' concept of a cosmic nous as the cause of the order of things, was an important turning point for him. But he also expressed disagreement with Anaxagoras' understanding of the implications of his own doctrine, because of Anaxagoras' materialist understanding of causation. Socrates complained that Anaxagoras restricted the work of the cosmic nous to the beginning, as if it were uninterested and all events since then just happened because of causes like air and water. Socrates, on the other hand, apparently insisted that the demiurge must be "loving," particularly concerning humanity. In this desire to go beyond Anaxagoras and make the cosmic nous a more active manager, Socrates was apparently preceded by Diogenes of Apollonia.

=== Plato and Aristotle ===
Plato's Timaeus is presented as a description of someone who is explaining a "likely story" in the form of a myth, and so throughout history commentators have disagreed about which elements of the myth can be seen as the position of Plato. Sedley (2007) nevertheless calls it "the creationist manifesto" and points out that although some of Plato's followers denied that he intended it, in classical times writers such as Aristotle, Epicurus, the Stoics, and Galen all understood Plato as proposing the world originated in an "intelligent creative act." Plato has a character explain the concept of a "demiurge" with supreme wisdom and intelligence as the creator of the cosmos in his work.

Plato's teleological perspective is also built upon the analysis of a priori order and structure in the world that he had already presented in The Republic. The story does not propose creation ex nihilo; rather, the demiurge made order from the chaos of the cosmos, imitating the eternal Forms.

Plato's world of eternal and unchanging Forms, imperfectly represented in matter by a divine Artisan, contrasts sharply with the various mechanistic Weltanschauungen, of which atomism was, by the 4th century at least, the most prominent ... This debate was to persist throughout the ancient world. Atomistic mechanism got a shot in the arm from Epicurus ... while the Stoics adopted a divine teleology ... The choice seems simple: either show how a structured, regular world could arise out of undirected processes, or inject intelligence into the system.

— R. J. Hankinson, Cause and Explanation in Ancient Greek Thought

Aristotle, Plato's student and friend (c. 384 – 322 BC), continued the Socratic tradition of criticising natural scientists such as Democritus who sought (as in modern science) to explain everything in terms of matter and chance motion. He was very influential in the future development of classical creationism, but was not a straightforward "creationist" because he required no creation interventions in nature, meaning he "insulated god from any requirement to intervene in nature, either as creator or as administrator." Instead of direct intervention by a creator it is "scarcely an exaggeration to say that for Aristotle the entire functioning of the natural world, as also the heavens, is ultimately to be understood as a shared striving towards godlike actuality." And whereas the myth in the Timaeus suggests that all living things are based on one single paradigm, not one for each species, and even tells a story of "devolution" whereby other living things devolved from humans, it was Aristotle who presented the influential idea that each type of normal living thing must be based on a fixed paradigm or form for that species.

Aristotle felt that biology was a particularly important example of a field where materialist natural science ignored information which was needed in order to understand living things well. For example birds use wings for the purpose of flight. Therefore the most complete explanation in regard to the natural, as well as the artificial, is for the most part teleological. In fact, proposals that species had changed by chance survival of the fittest, similar to what is now called "natural selection," were already known to Aristotle, and he rejected these with the same logic. He conceded that monstrosities (new forms of life) could come about by chance, but he disagreed with those who ascribed all nature purely to chance because he believed science can only provide a general account of that which is normal, "always, or for the most part." The distinction between what is normal, or by nature, and what is "accidental," or not by nature, is important in Aristotle's understanding of nature. As pointed out by Sedley, "Aristotle is happy to say (Physics II 8, 199a33-b4) without the slightest fear of blasphemy, crafts make occasional mistakes; therefore, by analogy, so can nature." According to Aristotle the changes which happen by nature are caused by their "formal causes," and for example in the case of a bird's wings there is also a final cause which is the purpose of flying. He explicitly compared this to human technology:

If then what comes from art is for the sake of something, it is clear that what come from nature is too ... This is clear most of all in the other animals, which do nothing by art, inquiry, or deliberation; for which reason some people are completely at a loss whether it is by intelligence or in some other way that spiders, ants, and such things work. ... It is absurd to think that a thing does not happen for the sake of something if we do not see what sets it in motion deliberating. ... This is most clear when someone practices medicine himself on himself; for nature is like that.

— Aristotle, Physics, II 8.

The question of how to understand Aristotle's conception of nature having a purpose and direction something like human activity is controversial in the details. Martha Nussbaum for example has argued that in his biology this approach was practical and meant to show nature only being analogous to human art, explanations of an organ being greatly informed by knowledge of its essential function. Nevertheless, Nussbaum's position is not universally accepted. In any case, Aristotle was not understood this way by his followers in the Middle Ages, who saw him as consistent with monotheistic religion and a teleological understanding of all nature. Consistent with the medieval interpretation, in his Metaphysics and other works Aristotle clearly argued a case for there being one highest god or "prime mover" which was the ultimate cause, though specifically not the material cause, of the eternal forms or natures which cause the natural order, including all living things. He clearly refers to this entity having an intellect that humans somehow share in, which helps humans see the true natures or forms of things without relying purely on sense perception of physical things, including living species. This understanding of nature, and Aristotle's arguments against materialist understandings of nature, were very influential in the Middle Ages in Europe. The idea of fixed species remained dominant in biology until Darwin, and a focus upon biology is still common today in teleological criticisms of modern science.

=== Roman era ===
It was the Stoics who "developed the battery of creationist arguments broadly known under the label 'The Argument from Design'". Cicero (c. 106 – c. 43 BC) reported the teleological argument of the Stoics in De Natura Deorum (On the Nature of the Gods) Book II, which includes an early version of the watchmaker analogy, which was later developed by William Paley. He has one of the characters in the dialogue say:

When you see a sundial or a water-clock, you see that it tells the time by design and not by chance. How then can you imagine that the universe as a whole is devoid of purpose and intelligence, when it embraces everything, including these artifacts themselves and their artificers?

— Cicero, De Natura Deorum, II.34

Another very important classical supporter of the teleological argument was Galen, whose compendious works were one of the major sources of medical knowledge until modern times, both in Europe and the medieval Islamic world. He was not a Stoic, but like them he looked back to the Socratics and was constantly engaged in arguing against atomists such as the Epicureans. Unlike Aristotle (who was however a major influence upon him), and unlike the Neoplatonists, he believed there was really evidence for something literally like the "demiurge" found in Plato's Timaeus, which worked physical upon nature. In works such as his On the Usefulness of Parts he explained evidence for it in the complexity of animal construction. His work shows "early signs of contact and contrast between the pagan and the Judaeo-Christian tradition of creation", criticizing the account found in the Bible. "Moses, he suggests, would have contented himself with saying that God ordered the eyelashes not to grow and that they obeyed. In contrast to this, the Platonic tradition's Demiurge is above all else a technician." Surprisingly, neither Aristotle nor Plato, but Xenophon are considered by Galen, as the best writer on this subject. Galen shared with Xenophon a scepticism of the value of books about most speculative philosophy, except for inquiries such as whether there is "something in the world superior in power and wisdom to man". This he saw as having an everyday importance, a usefulness for living well. He also asserted that Xenophon was the author who reported the real position of Socrates, including his aloofness from many types of speculative science and philosophy.

Galen's connection of the teleological argument to discussions about the complexity of living things, and his insistence that this is possible for a practical scientist, foreshadows some aspects of modern uses of the teleological argument.

== Medieval philosophy and theology ==
=== Late classical Christian writers ===
As an appeal to general revelation, Paul the Apostle (AD 5–67) argues in Romans 1:18–20 that because it has been made plain to all from what has been created in the world, it is obvious that there is a God.

Marcus Minucius Felix (c. late 2nd to 3rd century), an Early Christian writer, argued for the existence of God based on the analogy of an ordered house in his The Orders of Minucius Felix: "Supposing you went into a house and found everything neat, orderly and well-kept, surely you would assume it had a master, and one much better than the good things, his belongings; so in this house of the universe, when throughout heaven and earth you see the marks of foresight, order and law, may you not assume that the lord and author of the universe is fairer than the stars themselves or than any portions of the entire world?"

Augustine of Hippo (AD 354–430) in The City of God mentioned the idea that the world's "well-ordered changes and movements", and "the fair appearance of all visible things" was evidence for the world being created, and "that it could not have been created save by God".

=== Islamic philosophy ===
Early Islamic philosophy played an important role in developing the philosophical understandings of God among Jewish and Christian thinkers in the Middle Ages, but concerning the teleological argument one of the lasting effects of this tradition came from its discussions of the difficulties which this type of proof has. Various forms of the argument from design have been used by Islamic theologians and philosophers from the time of the early Mutakallimun theologians in the 9th century, although it is rejected by fundamentalist or literalist schools, for whom the mention of God in the Qu'ran should be sufficient evidence. The argument from design was also seen as an unconvincing sophism by the early Islamic philosopher Al-Farabi, who instead took the "emanationist" approach of the Neoplatonists such as Plotinus, whereby nature is rationally ordered, but God is not like a craftsman who literally manages the world. Later, Avicenna was also convinced of this, and proposed instead a cosmological argument for the existence of God.

The argument was however later accepted by both the Aristotelian philosopher Averroes (Ibn Rushd) and his great anti-philosophy opponent Al-Ghazali. Averroes' term for the argument was Dalīl al-ˁināya, which can be translated as "argument from providence". Both of them however accepted the argument because they believed it is explicitly mentioned in the Quran. Despite this, like Aristotle, the Neoplatonists, and Al-Farabi, Averroes proposed that order and continual motion in the world is caused by God's intellect. Whether Averroes was an "emanationist" like his predecessors has been a subject of disagreement and uncertainty. But it is generally agreed that what he adapted from those traditions, agreed with them about the fact that God does not create in the same way as a craftsman.

In fact then, Averroes treated the teleological argument as one of two "religious" arguments for the existence of God. The principal demonstrative proof is, according to Averroes, Aristotle's proof from motion in the universe that there must be a first mover which causes everything else to move. Averroes' position that the most logically valid proof should be physical rather than metaphysical (because then metaphysics would be proving itself) was in conscious opposition to the position of Avicenna. Later Jewish and Christian philosophers such as Thomas Aquinas were aware of this debate, and generally took a position closer to Avicenna.

=== Jewish philosophy ===
An example of the teleological argument in Jewish philosophy appears when the medieval Aristotelian philosopher Maimonides cites the passage in Isaiah 40:26, where the "Holy One" says: "Lift up your eyes on high, and behold who hath created these things, that bringeth out their host by number:" However, Barry Holtz calls this "a crude form of the argument from design", and that this "is only one possible way of reading the text". He asserts that "Generally, in the biblical texts the existence of God is taken for granted."

Maimonides also recalled that Abraham (in the midrash, or explanatory text, of Genesis Rabbah 39:1) recognized the existence of "one transcendent deity from the fact that the world around him exhibits an order and design". The midrash makes an analogy between the obviousness that a building has an owner, and that the world is looked after by God. Abraham says "Is it conceivable that the world is without a guide?" Because of these examples, the 19th century philosopher Nachman Krochmal called the argument from design "a cardinal principle of the Jewish faith".

The American orthodox rabbi, Aryeh Kaplan, retells a legend about the 2nd century AD Rabbi Meir. When told by a philosopher that he did not believe that the world was created by God, the rabbi produced a beautiful poem that he claimed had come into being when a cat accidentally knocked over a pot of ink, "spilling ink all over the document. This poem was the result." The philosopher exclaims that would be impossible: "There must be an author. There must be a scribe." The rabbi concludes, "How could the universe ... come into being by itself? There must be an Author. There must be a Creator."

=== Thomas Aquinas ===
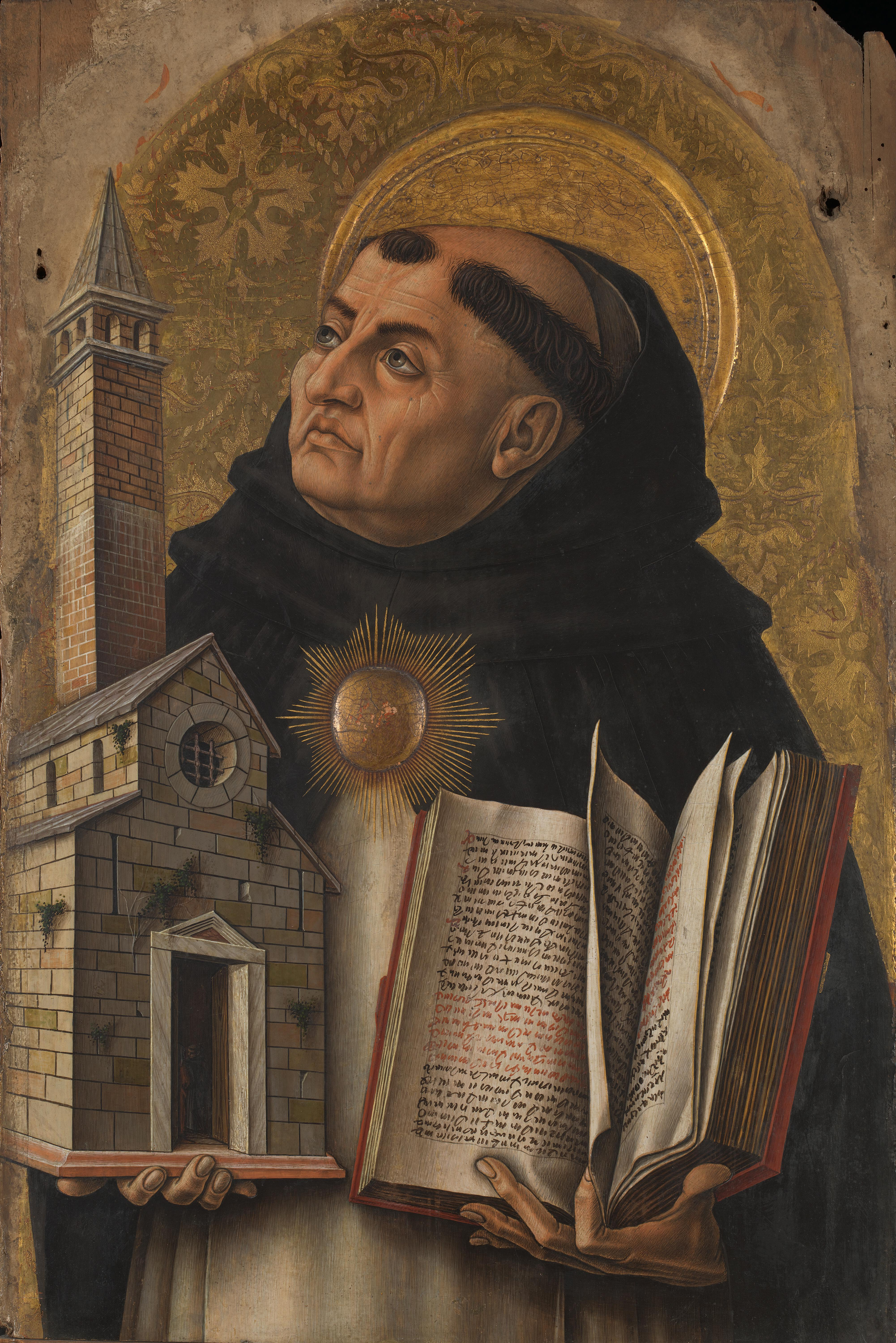
The fifth of Thomas Aquinas' proofs of God's existence was based on teleology.

Thomas Aquinas (1225–1274), whose writings became widely accepted within Catholic western Europe, was heavily influenced by Aristotle, Averroes, and other Islamic and Jewish philosophers. He presented a teleological argument in his Summa Theologica. In the work, Aquinas presented five ways in which he attempted to prove the existence of God: the quinque viae. These arguments feature only a posteriori arguments, rather than literal reading of holy texts. He sums up his teleological argument as follows:

The fifth way is taken from the governance of the world. We see that things which lack knowledge, such as natural bodies, act for an end, and this is evident from their acting always, or nearly always, in the same way, so as to obtain the best result. Hence it is plain that they achieve their end, not fortuitously, but designedly. Now whatever lacks knowledge cannot move towards an end, unless it be directed by some being endowed with knowledge and intelligence; as the arrow is directed by the archer. Therefore, some intelligent being exists by whom all natural things are directed to their end; and this being we call God.

— Thomas Aquinas, Summa Theologica: Article 3, Question 2)

Aquinas notes that the existence of final causes, by which a cause is directed toward an effect, can only be explained by an appeal to intelligence. However, as natural bodies aside from humans do not possess intelligence, there must, he reasons, exist a being that directs final causes at every moment. That being is what we call God.

== Modernity ==
=== Newton and Leibniz ===
Isaac Newton affirmed his belief in the truth of the argument when, in 1713, he wrote these words in an appendix to the second edition of his Principia:

This most elegant system of the sun, planets, and comets could not have arisen without the design and dominion of an intelligent and powerful being.

This view, that "God is known from his works", was supported and popularized by Newton's friends Richard Bentley, Samuel Clarke and William Whiston in the Boyle lectures, which Newton supervised. Newton wrote to Bentley, just before Bentley delivered the first lecture, that:

when I wrote my treatise about our Systeme I had an eye upon such Principles as might work with considering men for the beliefe [sic] of a Deity, and nothing can rejoice me more than to find it useful for that purpose.

The German philosopher Gottfried Leibniz disagreed with Newton's view of design in the teleological argument. In the Leibniz–Clarke correspondence, Samuel Clarke argued Newton's case that God constantly intervenes in the world to keep His design adjusted, while Leibniz thought that the universe was created in such a way that God would not need to intervene at all. As quoted by Ayval Leshem, Leibniz wrote:

According to [Newton's] doctrine, God Almighty wants [i.e. needs] to wind up his watch from time to time; otherwise it would cease to move. He had not it seems, sufficient foresight to make it a perpetual motion

Leibniz considered the argument from design to have "only moral certainty" unless it was supported by his own idea of pre-established harmony expounded in his Monadology. Bertrand Russell wrote that "The proof from the pre-established harmony is a particular form of the so-called physico-theological proof, otherwise known as the argument from design." According to Leibniz, the universe is completely made from individual substances known as monads, programmed to act in a predetermined way. Russell wrote:

In Leibniz's form, the argument states that the harmony of all the monads can only have arisen from a common cause. That they should all exactly synchronize, can only be explained by a Creator who pre-determined their synchronism.

=== Natural-law argument ===
The natural-law argument for the existence of God states that the observation of governing laws and existing order in the universe indicates the existence of a superior being who enacted these laws. The argument was popularised by Isaac Newton, René Descartes, and Robert Boyle. The argument of natural laws as a basis for God was changed by Christian figures such as Thomas Aquinas, in order to fit biblical scripture and establish a Judeo-Christian teleological law.

Bertrand Russell criticized the argument, arguing that many of the things considered to be laws of nature, in fact, are human conventions. The teleological argument assumes that one can infer the existence of intelligent design merely by examination, and because life is reminiscent of something a human might design, it too must have been designed. However, considering "snowflakes and crystals of certain salts", "[i]n no case do we find intelligence". "There are other ways that order and design can come about" such as by "purely physical forces."

=== British empiricists ===
The 17th-century Dutch writers Lessius and Grotius argued that the intricate structure of the world, like that of a house, was unlikely to have arisen by chance. The empiricist John Locke, writing in the late 17th century, developed the Aristotelian idea that, excluding geometry, all science must attain its knowledge a posteriori—through sensual experience. In response to Locke, Anglican Irish Bishop George Berkeley advanced a form of idealism in which things only continue to exist when they are perceived. When humans do not perceive objects, they continue to exist because God is perceiving them. Therefore, in order for objects to remain in existence, God must exist omnipresently.

David Hume, in the mid-18th century, referred to the teleological argument in his A Treatise of Human Nature. Here, he appears to give his support to the argument from design. John Wright notes that "Indeed, he claims that the whole thrust of his analysis of causality in the Treatise supports the Design argument", and that, according to Hume, "we are obliged 'to infer an infinitely perfect Architect.'"

However, later he was more critical of the argument in his An Enquiry Concerning Human Understanding. This was presented as a dialogue between Hume and "a friend who loves sceptical paradoxes", where the friend gives a version of the argument by saying of its proponents, they "paint in the most magnificent colours the order, beauty, and wise arrangement of the universe; and then ask if such a glorious display of intelligence could come from a random coming together of atoms, or if chance could produce something that the greatest genius can never sufficiently admire".

Hume also presented arguments both for and against the teleological argument in his Dialogues Concerning Natural Religion. The character Cleanthes, summarizing the teleological argument, likens the universe to a man-made machine, and concludes by the principle of similar effects and similar causes that it must have a designing intelligence:

Look round the world: contemplate the whole and every part of it: You will find it to be nothing but one great-machine, subdivided into an infinite number of lesser machines, which again admit of subdivisions to a degree beyond what human senses and faculties can trace and explain. All these various machines, and even their most minute parts, are adjusted to each other with an accuracy, which ravishes into admiration all men who have ever contemplated them. The curious adapting of means to ends, throughout all nature, resembles exactly, though it much exceeds, the productions of human contrivance; of human design, thought, wisdom, and intelligence. Since therefore the effects resemble each other, we are led to infer, by all the rules of analogy, that the causes also resemble; and that the Author of Nature is somewhat similar to the mind of man; though possessed of much larger faculties, proportioned to the grandeur of the work which he has executed. By this argument a posteriori, and by this argument alone, do we prove at once the existence of a Deity, and his similarity to human mind and intelligence.

On the other hand, Hume's sceptic, Philo, is not satisfied with the argument from design. He attempts a number of refutations, including one that arguably foreshadows Darwin's theory, and makes the point that if God resembles a human designer, then assuming divine characteristics such as omnipotence and omniscience is not justified. He goes on to joke that far from being the perfect creation of a perfect designer, this universe may be "only the first rude essay of some infant deity... the object of derision to his superiors".

=== Derham's natural theology ===
Starting in 1696 with his Artificial Clockmaker, William Derham published a stream of teleological books. The best known of these are Physico-Theology (1713); Astro-Theology (1714); and Christo-Theology (1730). Physico-Theology, for example, was explicitly subtitled "A demonstration of the being and attributes of God from his works of creation". A natural theologian, Derham listed scientific observations of the many variations in nature, and proposed that these proved "the unreasonableness of infidelity". At the end of the section on Gravity for instance, he writes: "What else can be concluded, but that all was made with manifest Design, and that all the whole Structure is the Work of some intelligent Being; some Artist, of Power and Skill equivalent to such a Work?" Also, of the "sense of sound" he writes:

For who but an intelligent Being, what less than an omnipotent and infinitely wise God could contrive, and make such a fine Body, such a Medium, so susceptible of every Impression, that the Sense of Hearing hath occasion for, to empower all Animals to express their Sense and Meaning to others.

Derham concludes: "For it is a Sign a Man is a wilful, perverse Atheist, that will impute so glorious a Work, as the Creation is, to any Thing, yea, a mere Nothing (as Chance is) rather than to God. Weber (2000) writes that Derham's Physico-Theology "directly influenced" William Paley's later work.

The power, and yet the limitations, of this kind of reasoning is illustrated in microcosm by the history of La Fontaine's fable of The Acorn and the Pumpkin, which first appeared in France in 1679. The light-hearted anecdote of how a doubting peasant is finally convinced of the wisdom behind creation arguably undermines this approach. However, beginning with Anne Finch's conversion of the story into a polemic against atheism, it has been taken up by a succession of moral writers as presenting a valid argument for the proposition that "The wisdom of God is displayed in creation."

=== Watchmaker analogy ===
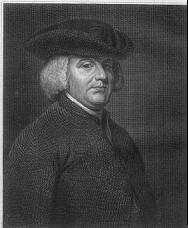
William Paley popularized the "watchmaker analogy" used by earlier natural theologians, making it a famous teleological argument.

The watchmaker analogy, framing the teleological argument with reference to a timepiece, dates at least back to the Stoics, who were reported by Cicero in his De Natura Deorum (II.88), using such an argument against Epicureans, whom, they taunt, would "think more highly of the achievement of Archimedes in making a model of the revolutions of the firmament than of that of nature in creating them, although the perfection of the original shows a craftsmanship many times as great as does the counterfeit". It was also used by Robert Hooke and Voltaire, the latter of whom remarked:

L'univers m'embarrasse, et je ne puis songer
Que cette horloge existe, et n'ait point d'horloger

Translation:

The Universe troubles me, and much less can I think
That this clock exists and should have no clockmaker.

William Paley presented his version of the watchmaker analogy at the start of his Natural Theology (1802).

[S]uppose I found a watch upon the ground, and it should be inquired how the watch happened to be in that place, I should hardly think...that, for anything I knew, the watch might have always been there. Yet why should not this answer serve for the watch as well as for [a] stone [that happened to be lying on the ground]?... For this reason, and for no other; namely, that, if the different parts had been differently shaped from what they are, if a different size from what they are, or placed after any other manner, or in any order than that in which they are placed, either no motion at all would have been carried on in the machine, or none which would have answered the use that is now served by it.

According to Alister McGrath, Paley argued that "The same complexity and utility evident in the design and functioning of a watch can also be discerned in the natural world. Each feature of a biological organism, like that of a watch, showed evidence of being designed in such a way as to adapt the organism to survival within its environment. Complexity and utility are observed; the conclusion that they were designed and constructed by God, Paley holds, is as natural as it is correct."

Natural theology strongly influenced British science, with the expectation as expressed by Adam Sedgwick in 1831 that truths revealed by science could not conflict with the moral truths of religion. These natural philosophers saw God as the first cause, and sought secondary causes to explain design in nature: the leading figure Sir John Herschel wrote in 1836 that by analogy with other intermediate causes "the origination of fresh species, could it ever come under our cognizance, would be found to be a natural in contradistinction to a miraculous process".

As a theology student, Charles Darwin found Paley's arguments compelling. However, he later developed his theory of evolution in his 1859 book On the Origin of Species, which offers an alternate explanation of biological order. In his autobiography, Darwin wrote that "The old argument of design in nature, as given by Paley, which formerly seemed to me so conclusive, fails, now that the law of natural selection has been discovered". Darwin struggled with the problem of evil and of suffering in nature, but remained inclined to believe that nature depended upon "designed laws" and commended Asa Gray's statement about "Darwin's great service to Natural Science in bringing back to it Teleology: so that, instead of Morphology versus Teleology, we shall have Morphology wedded to Teleology."

Darwin owned he was "bewildered" on the subject, but was "inclined to look at everything as resulting from designed laws, with the details, whether good or bad, left to the working out of what we may call chance:"

But I own that I cannot see, as plainly as others do, & as I shd wish to do, evidence of design & beneficence on all sides of us. There seems to me too much misery in the world. I cannot persuade myself that a beneficent & omnipotent God would have designedly created the Ichneumonidae with the express intention of their feeding within the living bodies of caterpillars, or that a cat should play with mice. Not believing this, I see no necessity in the belief that the eye was expressly designed.

== Recent proponents ==
=== Probabilistic arguments ===
In 1928 and 1930, F. R. Tennant published his Philosophical Theology, which was a "bold endeavour to combine scientific and theological thinking". He proposed a version of the teleological argument based on the accumulation of the probabilities of each individual biological adaptation. "Tennant concedes that naturalistic accounts such as evolutionary theory may explain each of the individual adaptations he cites, but he insists that in this case the whole exceeds the sum of its parts: naturalism can explain each adaptation but not their totality." The Routledge Encyclopedia of Philosophy notes that "Critics have insisted on focusing on the cogency of each piece of theistic evidence – reminding us that, in the end, ten leaky buckets hold no more water than one." Also, "Some critics, such as John Hick and D.H. Mellor, have objected to Tennant's particular use of probability theory and have challenged the relevance of any kind of probabilistic reasoning to theistic belief."

Richard Swinburne's "contributions to philosophical theology have sought to apply more sophisticated versions of probability theory to the question of God's existence, a methodological improvement on Tennant's work but squarely in the same spirit". He uses Bayesian probability "taking account not only of the order and functioning of nature but also of the 'fit' between human intelligence and the universe, whereby one can understand its workings, as well as human aesthetic, moral, and religious experience". Swinburne writes:

[T]he existence of order in the world confirms the existence of God if and only if the existence of this order in the world is more probable if there is a God than if there is not. ... the probability of order of the right kind is very much greater if there is a God, and so that the existence of such order adds greatly to the probability that there is a God.

Swinburne acknowledges that his argument by itself may not give a reason to believe in the existence of God, but in combination with other arguments such as cosmological arguments and evidence from mystical experience, he thinks it can.

While discussing Hume's arguments, Alvin Plantinga offered a probability version of the teleological argument in his book God and Other Minds:

Every contingent object such that we know whether or not it was the product of intelligent design, was the product of intelligent design.
The universe is a contingent object.
So probably the universe is designed.

Following Plantinga, Georges Dicker produced a slightly different version in his book about George Berkeley:

A. The world ... shows amazing teleological order.
B. All Objects exhibiting such order ... are products of intelligent design.
C. Probably the world is a result of intelligent design.
D. Probably, God exists and created the world.

The Encyclopædia Britannica has the following criticism of such arguments:

It can of course be said that any form in which the universe might be is statistically enormously improbable as it is only one of a virtual infinity of possible forms. But its actual form is no more improbable, in this sense, than innumerable others. It is only the fact that humans are part of it that makes it seem so special, requiring a transcendent explanation.

=== Fine-tuned universe ===
A modern variation of the teleological argument is built upon the concept of the fine-tuned universe. There is broad agreement among physicists and cosmologists of diverse worldviews that the Universe is in several respects 'fine-tuned' for life. According to the website Biologos:

Fine-tuning refers to the surprising precision of nature's physical constants, and the beginning state of the Universe. To explain the present state of the universe, even the best scientific theories require that the physical constants of nature and the beginning state of the Universe have extremely precise values.

Also, the fine-tuning of the Universe is the apparent delicate balance of conditions necessary for life to emerge. In this view, speculation about a vast range of possible conditions in which life cannot exist is used to explore the probability of conditions in which life can and does exist. For example, it can be argued that if the force of the Big Bang explosion had been different by 1/10 to the sixtieth power or the strong interaction force was only 5% different, life would be impossible. Noted physicist Stephen Hawking estimates that "if the rate of the universe's expansion one second after the Big Bang had been smaller by even one part in a hundred thousand million million, the universe would have re-collapsed into a hot fireball due to gravitational attraction". In terms of a teleological argument, the intuition in relation to a fine-tuned universe would be that God must have been responsible, if achieving such perfect conditions is so improbable. However, in regard to fine-tuning, Kenneth Einar Himma writes: "The mere fact that it is enormously improbable that an event occurred... by itself, gives us no reason to think that it occurred by design ... As intuitively tempting as it may be..." Himma attributes the "Argument from Suspicious Improbabilities", a formalization of "the fine-tuning intuition" to George N. Schlesinger:

To understand Schlesinger's argument, consider your reaction to two different events. If John wins a 1-in-1,000,000,000 lottery game, you would not immediately be tempted to think that John (or someone acting on his behalf) cheated. If, however, John won three consecutive 1-in-1,000 lotteries, you would immediately be tempted to think that John (or someone acting on his behalf) cheated. Schlesinger believes that the intuitive reaction to these two scenarios is epistemically justified. The structure of the latter event is such that it... justifies a belief that intelligent design is the cause... Despite the fact that the probability of winning three consecutive 1-in-1,000 games is exactly the same as the probability of winning one 1-in-1,000,000,000 game, the former event... warrants an inference of intelligent design.

Himma considers Schlesinger's argument to be subject to the same vulnerabilities he noted in other versions of the design argument:

While Schlesinger is undoubtedly correct in thinking that we are justified in suspecting design in the case [of winning] three consecutive lotteries, it is because—and only because—we know two related empirical facts about such events. First, we already know that there exist intelligent agents who have the right motivations and causal abilities to deliberately bring about such events. Second, we know from past experience with such events that they are usually explained by the deliberate agency of one or more of these agents. Without at least one of these two pieces of information, we are not obviously justified in seeing design in such cases ... [T]he problem for the fine-tuning argument is that we lack both of the pieces that are needed to justify an inference of design. First, the very point of the argument is to establish the fact that there exists an intelligent agency that has the right causal abilities and motivations to bring the existence of a universe capable of sustaining life. Second, and more obviously, we do not have any past experience with the genesis of worlds and are hence not in a position to know whether the existence of fine-tuned universes are usually explained by the deliberate agency of some intelligent agency. Because we lack this essential background information, we are not justified in inferring that there exists an intelligent Deity who deliberately created a universe capable of sustaining life.

Antony Flew, who spent most of his life as an atheist, converted to deism late in life, and postulated "an intelligent being as involved in some way in the design of conditions that would allow life to arise and evolve". He concluded that the fine-tuning of the universe was too precise to be the result of chance, so accepted the existence of God. He said that his commitment to "go where the evidence leads" meant that he ended up accepting the existence of God. Flew proposed the view, held earlier by Fred Hoyle, that the universe is too young for life to have developed purely by chance and that, therefore, an intelligent being must exist which was involved in designing the conditions required for life to evolve.

Would you not say to yourself, "Some super-calculating intellect must have designed the properties of the carbon atom, otherwise the chance of my finding such an atom through the blind forces of nature would be utterly minuscule." Of course you would ... A common sense interpretation of the facts suggests that a superintellect has monkeyed with physics, as well as with chemistry and biology, and that there are no blind forces worth speaking about in nature. The numbers one calculates from the facts seem to me so overwhelming as to put this conclusion almost beyond question.

— Fred Hoyle, Engineering and Science, The Universe: Past and Present Reflections

Robin Collins argues that the universe is fine-tuned for scientific discoverability, and that this fine-tuning cannot be explained by the multiverse hypothesis. According to Collins, the universe's laws, fundamental parameters, and initial conditions must be just right for the universe to be as discoverable as ours. According to Collins, examples of fine-tuning for discoverability include:

- The fine-structure constant is fine-tuned for energy usage. If it were stronger, there would be no practical way to harness energy. If it were weaker, fire would burn through wood too quickly and energy usage would be impractical.
- The baryon-to-photon ratio allowed for the discovery of the big bang via the cosmic microwave background.
- Many things in particle physics are within a narrow range required for discoverability, such as the mass of the Higgs boson.

=== Creation science and intelligent design ===
A version of the argument from design is central to both creation science and intelligent design, but unlike Paley's openness to deistic design through God-given laws, proponents seek scientific confirmation of repeated miraculous interventions in the history of life, and argue that their theistic science should be taught in science classrooms.

The teaching of evolution was effectively barred from United States public school curricula by the outcome of the 1925 Scopes Trial, but in the 1960s the National Defense Education Act led to the Biological Sciences Curriculum Study reintroducing the teaching of evolution. In response, there was a resurgence of creationism, now presented as "creation science", based on biblical literalism but with Bible quotes optional. ("Explicit references to the Bible were optional: Morris's 1974 book Scientific Creationism came in two versions, one with Bible quotes, and one without.")

A 1989 survey found that virtually all literature promoting creation science presented the design argument, with John D. Morris saying "any living thing gives such strong evidence for design by an intelligent designer that only a willful ignorance of the data (II Peter 3:5) could lead one to assign such intricacy to chance". Such publications introduced concepts central to intelligent design, including irreducible complexity (a variant of the watchmaker analogy) and specified complexity (closely resembling a fine-tuning argument). The United States Supreme Court ruling on Edwards v. Aguillard barred the teaching of "Creation Science" in public schools because it breached the separation of church and state, and a group of creationists rebranded Creation Science as "intelligent design" which was presented as a scientific theory rather than as a religious argument.

Scientists disagreed with the assertion that intelligent design is scientific, and its introduction into the science curriculum of a Pennsylvania school district led to the 2005 Kitzmiller v. Dover Area School District trial, which ruled that the "intelligent design" arguments are essentially religious in nature and not science. The court took evidence from theologian John F. Haught, and ruled that "ID is not a new scientific argument, but is rather an old religious argument for the existence of God. He traced this argument back to at least Thomas Aquinas in the 13th century, who framed the argument as a syllogism: Wherever complex design exists, there must have been a designer; nature is complex; therefore nature must have had an intelligent designer." "This argument for the existence of God was advanced early in the 19th century by Reverend Paley": "The only apparent difference between the argument made by Paley and the argument for ID, as expressed by defense expert witnesses Behe and Minnich, is that ID's 'official position' does not acknowledge that the designer is God."

Proponents of the intelligent design movement such as Cornelius G. Hunter, have asserted that the methodological naturalism upon which science is based is religious in nature. They commonly refer to it as 'scientific materialism' or as 'methodological materialism' and conflate it with 'metaphysical naturalism'. They use this assertion to support their claim that modern science is atheistic, and contrast it with their preferred approach of a revived natural philosophy which welcomes supernatural explanations for natural phenomena and supports theistic science. This ignores the distinction between science and religion, established in Ancient Greece, in which science can not use supernatural explanations.

Intelligent design advocate and biochemist Michael Behe proposed a development of Paley's watch analogy in which he argued in favour of intelligent design. Unlike Paley, Behe only attempts to prove the existence of an intelligent designer, rather than the God of classical theism. Behe uses the analogy of a mousetrap to propose irreducible complexity: he argues that if a mousetrap loses just one of its parts, it can no longer function as a mousetrap. He argues that irreducible complexity in an object guarantees the presence of intelligent design. Behe claims that there are instances of irreducible complexity in the natural world and that parts of the world must have been designed. This negative argument against step by step evolution ignores longstanding evidence that evolution proceeds through changes of function from preceding systems. The specific examples Behe proposes have been shown to have simpler homologues which could act as precursors with different functions. His arguments have been rebutted, both in general and in specific cases by numerous scientific papers. In response, Behe and others, "ironically, given the absence of any detail in their own explanation, complain that the proffered explanations lack sufficient detail to be empirically tested".

=== Unreasonable effectiveness of mathematics ===
William Lane Craig has proposed a nominalist argument influenced by the philosophy of mathematics. This argument revolves around the fact that, by using mathematical concepts, we can discover much about the natural world. For example, Craig writes, Peter Higgs, and any similar scientist, "can sit down at his desk and, by pouring [sic] over mathematical equations, predict the existence of a fundamental particle which, thirty years later, after investing millions of dollars and thousands of man-hours, experimentalists are finally able to detect." He names mathematics the 'language of nature', and refutes two possible explanations for this. Firstly, he suggests, the idea that they are abstract entities brings about the question of their application. Secondly, he responds to the problem of whether they are merely useful fictions by suggesting that this asks why these fictions are so useful. Citing Eugene Wigner as an influence on his thought, he summarizes his argument as follows:

1. If God did not exist, the applicability of mathematics would be just a happy coincidence.
2. The applicability of mathematics is not just a happy coincidence.
3. Therefore, God exists.

=== "Third way" proposal ===
University of Chicago geneticist James A. Shapiro, writing in the Boston Review, states that advancements in genetics and molecular biology, and "the growing realization that cells have molecular computing networks which process information about internal operations and about the external environment to make decisions controlling growth, movement, and differentiation", have implications for the teleological argument. Shapiro states that these "natural genetic engineering" systems, can produce radical reorganizations of the "genetic apparatus within a single cell generation". Shapiro suggests what he calls a 'Third Way'; a non-creationist, non-Darwinian type of evolution:

What significance does an emerging interface between biology and information science hold for thinking about evolution? It opens up the possibility of addressing scientifically rather than ideologically the central issue so hotly contested by fundamentalists on both sides of the Creationist-Darwinist debate: Is there any guiding intelligence at work in the origin of species displaying exquisite adaptations ...

In his book, Evolution: A View from the 21st Century, Shapiro refers to this concept of "natural genetic engineering", which he says, has proved troublesome, because many scientists feel that it supports the intelligent design argument. He suggests that "function-oriented capacities [can] be attributed to cells", even though this is "the kind of teleological thinking that scientists have been taught to avoid at all costs".

=== Interacting whole ===
The metaphysical theologian Norris Clarke shared an argument to his fellow professors at Fordham University that was popularised by Peter Kreeft in his "Twenty Arguments for the Existence of God" (1994). The argument states that as components are ordered universally in relation to one another, and are defined by these connections (for example, every two hydrogen atoms are ordered to form a compound with one oxygen atom.) Therefore, none of the parts are self-sufficient, and cannot be explained individually. However, the whole cannot be explained either because it is composed of separate beings and is not a whole. From here, three conclusions can be found: firstly, as the system cannot in any way explain itself, it requires an efficient cause. Secondly, it must be an intelligent mind because the unity transcends every part, and thus must have been conceived as an idea, because, by definition, only an idea can hold together elements without destroying or fusing their distinctness. An idea cannot exist without a creator, so there must be an intelligent mind. Thirdly, the creative mind must be transcendent, because if it were not, it would rely upon the system of space and time, despite having created it. Such an idea is absurd. As a conclusion, therefore, the universe relies upon a transcendent creative mind.

=== The naïve teleological argument ===
The naïve teleological argument is a recent argument from apparent design put forward by C. Stephen Evans. The essential idea of the argument is that the world appears designed and that this is itself reason to belief the world is designed. Moreover, according to Evans, if God does exist, then the likelihood is that the tendency of human beings to see design in the world is due to it being a natural sign through which God reveals himself. However, regarding the scope of the argument itself, Evans is careful to say that the naïve teleological argument does not specify the type of designer or even the number of designers.

Evans says the argument can work on both externalist and internalist epistemological accounts. While the details differ between the two, the core idea is that if something appears to have a particular characteristic, that is reason to think it does have that particular characteristic. For example, if an apple appears juicy, that is reason to think it is in fact juicy. Since the world appears to be designed, that is itself reason to think that the world is designed. Evans's position is that belief in the appearance of design can be basic (that is not, depending on other beliefs) and is available to people across times, cultures, and abilities with no need for sophisticated scientific knowledge.

A key objection Evans addresses goes as follows: The world may appear to be designed, but given what we know about evolution and other natural processes, we know that it is not designed. Evans's response is essentially that, if God exists, God created the whole world, including all its natural processes. In that, God would deserve credit for creating the natural processes themselves, much in the way that a farmer may thank God for rain despite knowing about the water cycle. That is, just because one understands an impersonal means does not mean that no personal cause stands behind that impersonal means. According to Evans, “It is in principle not possible for any natural explanation that employs natural entities and natural laws to falsify the claim that God is the ultimate cause of some event or state of affairs.”

The result is that, according to Evans, scientific discoveries cannot decrease the strength of the naïve teleological argument. On the other hand, Evans says no scientific discoveries can increase its probability either since, say, adding cosmic fine tuning into the equation would result in a different variety of argument.

== Criticism ==
=== Classical ===
The original development of the argument from design was in reaction to atomistic, explicitly non-teleological understandings of nature. Socrates, as reported by Plato and Xenophon, was reacting to such natural philosophers. While less has survived from the debates of the Hellenistic and Roman eras, it is clear from sources such as Cicero and Lucretius, that debate continued for generations, and several of the striking metaphors used still today, such as the unseen watchmaker, and the infinite monkey theorem, have their roots in this period. While the Stoics became the most well-known proponents of the argument from design, the atomistic counter arguments were refined most famously by the Epicureans. On the one hand, they criticized the supposed evidence for intelligent design, and the logic of the Stoics. On the defensive side, they were faced with the challenge of explaining how un-directed chance can cause something which appears to be a rational order. Much of this defence revolved around arguments such as the infinite monkey metaphor. Democritus had already apparently used such arguments at the time of Socrates, saying that there will be infinite planets, and only some having an order like the planet we know. But the Epicureans refined this argument, by proposing that the actual number of types of atoms in nature is small, not infinite, making it less coincidental that after a long period of time, certain orderly outcomes will result.

These were not the only positions held in classical times. A more complex position also continued to be held by some schools, such as the Neoplatonists, who, like Plato and Aristotle, insisted that Nature did indeed have a rational order, but were concerned about how to describe the way in which this rational order is caused. According to Plotinus for example, Plato's metaphor of a craftsman should be seen only as a metaphor, and Plato should be understood as agreeing with Aristotle that the rational order in nature works through a form of causation unlike everyday causation. In fact, according to this proposal each thing already has its own nature, fitting into a rational order, whereby the thing itself is "in need of, and directed towards, what is higher or better".

=== David Hume ===
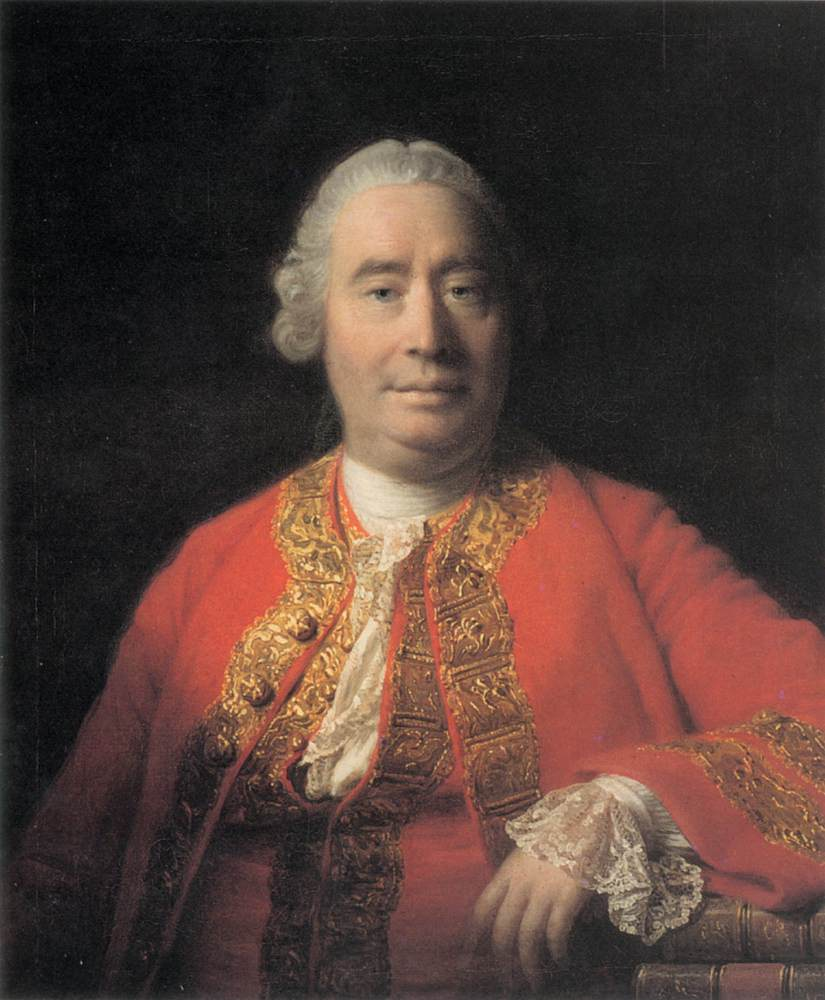
David Hume outlined his criticisms of the teleological argument in his Dialogues Concerning Natural Religion.

Louis Loeb writes that David Hume, in his Enquiry, "insists that inductive inference cannot justify belief in extended objects". Loeb also quotes Hume as writing:

It is only when two species of objects are found to be constantly conjoined, that we can infer the one from the other. ... If experience and observation and analogy be, indeed, the only guides which we can reasonably follow in inference of this nature; both the effect and cause must bear a similarity and resemblance to other effects and causes...which we have found, in many instances, to be conjoined with another. ... [The proponents of the argument] always suppose the universe, an effect quite singular and unparalleled, to be the proof of a Deity, a cause no less singular and unparalleled.

Loeb notes that "we observe neither God nor other universes, and hence no conjunction involving them. There is no observed conjunction to ground an inference either to extended objects or to God, as unobserved causes."

Hume also presented a criticism of the argument in his Dialogues Concerning Natural Religion. The character Philo, a religious sceptic, voices Hume's criticisms of the argument. He argues that the design argument is built upon a faulty analogy as, unlike with man-made objects, we have not witnessed the design of a universe, so do not know whether the universe was the result of design. Moreover, the size of the universe makes the analogy problematic: although our experience of the universe is of order, there may be chaos in other parts of the universe. Philo argues:

A very small part of this great system, during a very short time, is very imperfectly discovered to us; and do we thence pronounce decisively concerning the origin of the whole?

— David Hume, Dialogues 2

Philo also proposes that the order in nature may be due to nature alone. If nature contains a principle of order within it, the need for a designer is removed. Philo argues that even if the universe is indeed designed, it is unreasonable to justify the conclusion that the designer must be an omnipotent, omniscient, benevolent God – the God of classical theism. It is impossible, he argues, to infer the perfect nature of a creator from the nature of its creation. Philo argues that the designer may have been defective or otherwise imperfect, suggesting that the universe may have been a poor first attempt at design. Hume also pointed out that the argument does not necessarily lead to the existence of one God: “why may not several deities combine in contriving and framing the world?” (p. 108).

Wesley C. Salmon developed Hume's insights, arguing that all things in the universe which exhibit order are, to our knowledge, created by material, imperfect, finite beings or forces. He also argued that there are no known instances of an immaterial, perfect, infinite being creating anything. Using the probability calculus of Bayes' theorem, Salmon concludes that it is very improbable that the universe was created by the type of intelligent being theists argue for.

Nancy Cartwright accuses Salmon of begging the question. One piece of evidence he uses in his probabilistic argument – that atoms and molecules are not caused by design – is equivalent to the conclusion he draws, that the universe is probably not caused by design. The atoms and molecules are what the universe is made up of and whose origins are at issue. Therefore, they cannot be used as evidence against the theistic conclusion.

=== Intelligence may not be God ===
Referring to it as the physico-theological proof, Immanuel Kant discussed the teleological argument in his Critique of Pure Reason. Even though he referred to it as "the oldest, clearest and most appropriate to human reason", he nevertheless rejected it, heading section VI with the words, "On the impossibility of a physico-theological proof." In accepting some of Hume's criticisms, Kant wrote that the argument "proves at most intelligence only in the arrangement of the 'matter' of the universe, and hence the existence not of a 'Supreme Being', but of an 'Architect'". Using the argument to try to prove the existence of God required "a concealed appeal to the Ontological argument".

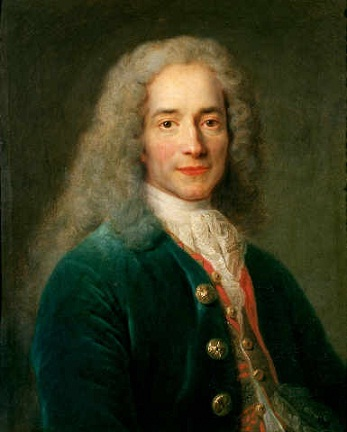
Voltaire argued that, at best, the teleological argument could only indicate the existence of a powerful, but not necessarily all-powerful or all-knowing, intelligence.

In his Traité de métaphysique Voltaire argued that, even if the argument from design could prove the existence of a powerful intelligent designer, it would not prove that this designer is God.

... from this sole argument I cannot conclude anything further than that it is probable that an intelligent and superior being has skillfully prepared and fashioned the matter. I cannot conclude from that alone that this being has made matter out of nothing and that he is infinite in every sense.

— Voltaire, Traité de métaphysique

=== Argument from improbability ===
Richard Dawkins is harshly critical of intelligent design in his book The God Delusion. In this book, he contends that an appeal to intelligent design can provide no explanation for biology because it not only begs the question of the designer's own origin but raises additional questions: an intelligent designer must itself be far more complex and difficult to explain than anything it is capable of designing. He believes the chances of life arising on a planet like the Earth are many orders of magnitude less probable than most people would think, but the anthropic principle effectively counters skepticism with regard to improbability. For example Astronomer Fred Hoyle suggested that potential for life on Earth was no more probable than a Boeing 747 being assembled by a hurricane from the scrapyard. Dawkins argues that a one-time event is indeed subject to improbability but once under way, natural selection itself is nothing like random chance. Furthermore, he refers to his counter argument to the argument from improbability by that same name:

The argument from improbability is the big one. In the traditional guise of the argument from design, it is easily today's most popular argument offered in favour of the existence of God and it is seen, by an amazingly large number of theists, as completely and utterly convincing. It is indeed a very strong and, I suspect, unanswerable argument—but in precisely the opposite direction from the theist's intention. The argument from improbability, properly deployed, comes close to proving that God does not exist. My name for the statistical demonstration that God almost certainly does not exist is the Ultimate Boeing 747 gambit.

The creationist misappropriation of the argument from improbability always takes the same general form, and it doesn't make any difference ... [if called] 'intelligent design' (ID). Some observed phenomenon—often a living creature or one of its more complex organs, but it could be anything from a molecule up to the universe itself—is correctly extolled as statistically improbable. Sometimes the language of information theory is used: the Darwinian is challenged to explain the source all the information in living matter, in the technical sense of information content as a measure of improbability or 'surprise value'... However statistically improbable the entity you seek to explain by invoking a designer, the designer himself has got to be at least as improbable. God is the Ultimate Boeing 747.

... The whole argument turns on the familiar question 'Who made God?' ... A designer God cannot be used to explain organized complexity because any God capable of designing anything would have to be complex enough to demand the same kind of explanation in his own right. God presents an infinite regress from which he cannot help us to escape. This argument... demonstrates that God, though not technically disprovable, is very very improbable indeed.

— Richard Dawkins, The God Delusion

Dawkins considered the argument from improbability to be "much more powerful" than the teleological argument, or argument from design, although he sometimes implies the terms are used interchangeably. He paraphrases St. Thomas' teleological argument as follows: "Things in the world, especially living things, look as though they have been designed. Nothing that we know looks designed unless it is designed. Therefore there must have been a designer, and we call him God."

Philosopher Edward Feser contends that Dawkins fundamentally misunderstands the teleological argument, particularly Aquinas' version, and refutes a straw man.

=== Perception of purpose in biology ===
The philosopher of biology Michael Ruse has argued that Darwin treated the structure of organisms as if they had a purpose: "the organism-as-if-it-were-designed-by God picture was absolutely central to Darwin's thinking in 1862, as it always had been". He refers to this as "the metaphor of design ... Organisms give the appearance of being designed, and thanks to Charles Darwin's discovery of natural selection we know why this is true." In his review of Ruse's book, R.J. Richards writes, "Biologists quite routinely refer to the design of organisms and their traits, but properly speaking it's apparent design to which they refer – an 'as if' design." Robert Foley refers to this as "the illusion of purpose, design, and progress". He adds, "there is no purpose in a fundamentally causative manner in evolution but that the processes of selection and adaptation give the illusion of purpose through the utter functionality and designed nature of the biological world".

Richard Dawkins suggests that while biology can at first seem to be purposeful and ordered, upon closer inspection its true function becomes questionable. Dawkins rejects the claim that biology serves any designed function, claiming rather that biology only mimics such purpose. In his book The Blind Watchmaker, Dawkins states that animals are the most complex things in the known universe: "Biology is the study of complicated things that give the appearance of having been designed for a purpose." He argues that natural selection should suffice as an explanation of biological complexity without recourse to divine providence.

However, theologian Alister McGrath has pointed out that the fine-tuning of carbon is even responsible for nature's ability to tune itself to any degree.

[The entire biological] evolutionary process depends upon the unusual chemistry of carbon, which allows it to bond to itself, as well as other elements, creating highly complex molecules that are stable over prevailing terrestrial temperatures, and are capable of conveying genetic information (especially DNA). ... Whereas it might be argued that nature creates its own fine-tuning, this can only be done if the primordial constituents of the universe are such that an evolutionary process can be initiated. The unique chemistry of carbon is the ultimate foundation of the capacity of nature to tune itself.

Proponents of intelligent design creationism, such as William A. Dembski question the philosophical assumptions made by critics with regard to what a designer would or would not do. Dembski claims that such arguments are not merely beyond the purview of science: often they are tacitly or overtly theological while failing to provide a serious analysis of the hypothetical objective's relative merit. Some critics, such as Stephen Jay Gould suggest that any purported 'cosmic' designer would only produce optimal designs, while there are numerous biological criticisms to demonstrate that such an ideal is manifestly untenable. Against these ideas, Dembski characterizes both Dawkins' and Gould's argument as a rhetorical straw man. He suggests a principle of constrained optimization more realistically describes the best any designer could hope to achieve:

Not knowing the objectives of the designer, Gould was in no position to say whether the designer proposed a faulty compromise among those objectives… In criticizing design, biologists tend to place a premium on functionalities of individual organisms and see design as optimal to the degree that those individual functionalities are maximized. But higher-order designs of entire ecosystems might require lower-order designs of individual organisms to fall short of maximal function.

— William A. Dembski, The Design Revolution: Answering the Toughest Questions About Intelligent Design

=== Fideism and rejection of natural theology ===
Some theologians oppose the usage of human reason and science in attaining knowledge of God altogether, asserting the primacy of faith in this endeavour.

=== Alleged argument from analogy ===
The design claim can be challenged as an argument from analogy. Supporters of design suggest that natural objects and man-made objects have many similar properties, and man-made objects have a designer. Therefore, it is probable that natural objects must be designed as well. However, proponents must demonstrate that all the available evidence has been taken into account. Eric Rust argues that, when speaking of familiar objects such as watches, "we have a basis to make an inference from such an object to its designer". However, the "universe is a unique and isolated case" and we have nothing to compare it with, so "we have no basis for making an inference such as we can with individual objects. ... We have no basis for applying to the whole universe what may hold of constituent elements in the universe."

=== Other criticisms ===
George H. Smith, in his book Atheism: The Case Against God, points out what he considers to be a flaw in the argument from design:

Now consider the idea that nature itself is the product of design. How could this be demonstrated? Nature ... provides the basis of comparison by which we distinguish between designed objects and natural objects. We are able to infer the presence of design only to the extent that the characteristics of an object differ from natural characteristics. Therefore, to claim that nature as a whole was designed is to destroy the basis by which we differentiate between artifacts and natural objects.

The teleological argument assumes that one can infer the existence of intelligent design merely by examination, and because life is reminiscent of something a human might design, it too must have been designed. However, considering "snowflakes and crystals of certain salts", "[i]n no case do we find intelligence". "There are other ways that order and design can come about" such as by "purely physical forces."

Most professional biologists support the modern evolutionary synthesis, not merely as an alternative explanation for the complexity of life but a better explanation with more supporting evidence. Living organisms obey the same physical laws as inanimate objects. Over very long periods of time self-replicating structures arose and later formed DNA.

In response to such objections, Andrew Loke of Hong Kong Baptist University argues that these can be avoided by formulating the argument deductively as an argument by exclusion concerning the possible explanations for the highly ordered laws of nature rather than as an argument based on analogy, and that the objection from evolution is invalid because evolution requires the highly ordered laws of nature to be already in place.

== Similar discussions in other civilizations ==
=== Hinduism ===
Nyaya, the Hindu school of logic, had a version of the argument from design. P.G. Patil writes that, in this view, it is not the complexity of the world from which one can infer the existence of a creator, but the fact that "the world is made up of parts". In this context, it is the Supreme Soul, Ishvara, who created all the world.

The argument is in five parts:

1. The ... world ... has been constructed by an intelligent agent.
2. On account of being an effect.
3. Each and every effect has been constructed by an intelligent agent, just like a pot.
4. And the world is an effect.
5. Therefore, it has been constructed by an intelligent agent.

However, other Hindu schools, such as Samkhya, deny that the existence of God can ever be proved, because such a creator can never be perceived. Krishna Mohan Banerjee, in his Dialogues on the Hindu Philosophy, has the Samkhya speaker saying, "the existence of God cannot be established because there is no proof. ... nor can it be proved by Inference, because you cannot exhibit an analogous instance."

=== Buddhist criticism of Hindu Nyaya logic ===
Buddhism denies the existence of a creator god, and rejects the Nyaya syllogism for the teleological argument as being "logically flawed". Buddhists argue that "the 'creation' of the world cannot be shown to be analogous to the creation of a human artifact, such as a pot".

=== Confucianism ===
The 18th century German philosopher Christian Wolff once thought that Confucius was a godless man, and that "the ancient Chinese had no natural religion, since they did not know the creator of the world". However, later, Wolff changed his mind to some extent. "On Wolff's reading, Confucius's religious perspective is thus more or less the weak deistic one of Hume's Cleanthes."

=== Taoism ===
The Taoist writings of the 6th-century-BC philosopher Laozi (also known as Lao Tzu) have similarities with modern naturalist science. B. Schwartz notes that, in Taoism, "The processes of nature are not guided by a teleological consciousness ... the tao [dao] is not consciously providential.

== See also ==
- Argument from beauty
- Inverse gambler's fallacy
- Deism
- No miracles argument
- Turtles all the way down
- Intelligent design
- Orthogenesis - teleology in evolution
