= Philosophy of Time Society =

The Philosophy of Time Society is an academic organization which aims to promote the study of the philosophy of time from a broad analytic perspective, and to provide a forum to disseminate research and to discuss issues in and related to the philosophy of time, primarily as an affiliated group with the American Philosophical Association.

The society grew out of a National Endowment for the Humanities Summer Seminar on the Philosophy of Time offered by George N. Schlesinger in 1991. The organization itself was formed in 1993. The current President of the Society is David Ingram. Past Presidents have included Nina Emery, Craig Callender, and L. Nathan Oaklander.

The Philosophy of Time Society's meetings are held at the three divisional meetings of the American Philosophical Association. In the past, they have included many notable scholars such as Craig Callender, L. A. Paul, Robin Le Poidevin, Ned Markosian, D. H. Mellor, John Perry, Theodore Sider, Michael Tooley, and Dean Zimmerman. Topics of papers have varied widely.
