= A Refutation of Deism =

1814 political pamphlet by Percy Bysshe Shelley

- The 1814 first edition title page of A Refutation of Deism, London, UK.
- Author: Percy Bysshe Shelley
- Language: English
- Published: 1814
- Publisher: Schulze and Dean
- Publication place: United Kingdom
- Pages: 101
- Text: A Refutation of Deism at Wikisource

"A Refutation of Deism: In a Dialogue" is a pamphlet on religion and philosophy by Romantic poet Percy Bysshe Shelley printed privately in 1814 in London by Schulze and Dean. It was published anonymously.

It is a philosophical dialogue that seeks to disprove or deconstruct the Deist argument of a rational, intelligent designer. Shelley argues that there is no logical middle ground: rational thought must lead strictly to Atheism, not Deism or Christianity.

The work is an analysis of atheism and the nature of religious belief begun in the 1811 essay The Necessity of Atheism and Queen Mab (1813). Shelley defined atheism in Queen Mab, Canto VII, Note 13: "There Is No God. This negation must be understood solely to affect a creative Deity. The hypothesis of a pervading Spirit co-eternal with the universe remains unshaken."

== Background ==
The title page has the Greek term Synetoisin (Συνετοῖσιν), the dative plural form of synetos (intelligent, wise, or understanding).

It was intended for those who possess true intellectual comprehension or discernment, rather than the general, uncritical public.

The Socratic dialogue format is used throughout. Shelley wrote the essay as a conversation between two characters: Eusebes (representing a Christian) and Theosophus (representing a Deist).

Through their debate, Eusebes deconstructs Theosophus's Deism, leaving only the realization that the arguments used by Deists ultimately lead ineluctably to Atheism.

Shelley breaks down the central argument using the following key points:

He begins by deconstructing the "Design" argument.

Deism relies on the "watchmaker" analogy, that the universe is so complex it must have a supreme architect. Shelley argued that this argument was logically flawed: "If we examine the structure of a watch, we shall readily confess the existence of a watch-maker."

He argued instead that:

"The laws of motion and the properties of matter suffice to account for every phenomenon, or combination of phenomena exhibited in the Universe. That certain animals exist in certain climates, results from the consentaneity of their frames to the circumstances of their situation: let these circumstances be altered to a sufficient degree, and the elements of their composition, must exist in some new combination".

He anticipated evolution and evolutionary thought decades before Charles Darwin.

The "Who Designed the Designer? Paradox" is invoked. He asked who designed the creator, pointing out that if the universe requires an intelligent creator to exist, the supposed creator would inherently require an equally complex creator.

"Design" is a trap of human imagination. Shelley reasoned that "design" is simply a projection of human characteristics and ordering onto natural, random phenomena. He claimed that explaining physical matter by proposing a deity merely invents a superfluous hypothesis that creates more contradictions than it solves.

William Paley had made the design argument or "argument from design" (teleological argument) by maintaining that the universe's complexity implies an intelligent creator.

In Natural Theology (1802), Paley argued that just as a complex watch demands a watchmaker, the intricate workings of nature demand a divine designer.

Shelley maintained that the universe is in constant flux, that animals change due to their surroundings, "the circumstances of their situation".

A divine origin is improperly imputed to what are natural phenomena that are evolving, not static, one-off permanent designs.

== Publication history ==
A Refutation of Deism in a Dialogue was published in 1814 privately by Shelley, printed by Schulze and Dean at 13 Poland Street in London.

It was republished in 1890 by the Progressive Publishing Company in London, with an introduction by G.W. Foote in London and sold for four pence.

It was republished in Shelley's Prose or Trumpet of a Prophecy in 1954.

The essay appeared in Christopher Hitchens' The Portable Atheist: Essential Readings for the Nonbeliever, an anthology of seminal writings on atheism throughout history published in 2007.

== Summary ==
Shelley sought to refute both Deism and Natural Theology.

He began by showing the flaw of the Design Argument.

He pointed out the logical fallacy of using order in the universe to prove a creator, arguing that it cannot be assumed the universe is a "design" without already assuming a creator or designer.

He argued that no proof was offered:

"Design must be proved before a designer can be inferred. The matter in controversy is the existence of design in the Universe, and it is not permitted to assume the contested premises and thence infer the matter in dispute."

He showed nature's chaos and the existence of pain and suffering to disprove a loving God.

Shelley attacked the Deist assumption of a benevolent God by demonstrating that the natural world is replete with suffering and destruction, rather than perfect harmony and peace:

"Populous cities are destroyed by earthquakes, and desolated by pestilence. Ambition is every where devoting its millions to incalculable calamity. Superstition, in a thousand shapes, is employed in brutalizing and degrading the human species, and fitting it to endure without a murmur the oppression of its innumerable tyrants."

He showed the inevitability of Atheism because neither Deism nor religion can be established by reason.

"The object of the following Dialogue is to prove that the system of Deism is untenable. It is attempted to shew that there is no alternative between Atheism and Christianity; that the evidences of the Being of a God are to be deduced from no other principles than those of Divine Revelation."

He summarized the central thesis of the essay: If the supernatural claims of Christianity are rejected based on reason, that same reason must inevitably lead past Deism into atheism.

Shelley structured these arguments through a deliberate, ironic reversal of roles, where Eusebes (the Christian) delivers the most devastating blows against the Deist's reliance on nature.

These are the three points made in the dialogue:

The "Design Argument" Flaw made by Eusebes (The Christian)

Theosophus (the Deist) opens the dialogue by stating that the order of the cosmos is an absolute proof of a supreme architect.

Eusebes attacks this point. He argues that the Deist is guilty of circular reasoning. By observing the universe and calling it a "design", the Deist presupposes the concept of a "designer" in the premise. Eusebes points out that matter itself could possess inherent properties that cause it to organize, reducing the existence of a separate creator to an unnecessary assumption.

"Nature's Chaos and Pain" Argument by Eusebes (The Christian)

Eusebes (the Christian) attacked the idea that nature proves a loving God. He informed Theosophus of earthquakes, diseases, and predation. The world is violent.

Eusebes seeks to prove that nature is corrupt and requires the Bible and divine revelation to understand God.

Eusebes's critique of nature refutes the notion of the Deist's benevolent God. What emerges is a godless and chaotic natural world.

"The Inevitability of Atheism" Argument by Theosophus (The Deist)

After Eusebes undermines the Deist's belief in nature, Theosophus uses the same skeptical and rational argument to refute Eusebes's Christianity. If strict reason is applied, the miracles, prophecies, and moral contradictions of the Bible are rendered illogical and supernatural.

At the end of the dialogue, both have undermined and refuted each other's positions.

Shelley's conclusion is that Eusebes's arguments prove nature does not need a God and Theosophus's arguments prove religion is a myth or supernatural.

The characters assume they are arguing for Christianity or Deism, but Shelley has them inadvertently collaborate to prove that atheism is the only logical conclusion that can be reached.

== Influence ==
The work, along with The Necessity of Atheism and Queen Mab, is a seminal tract in the development and evolution of atheism. In The Portable Atheist, a collection of the most important writings on atheism throughout history, Christopher Hitchens introduced Percy Bysshe Shelley's A Refutation of Deism (1814) by praising Shelley's razor-sharp logic against creationism, noting that Shelley correctly argued design must first be proven before a designer can be logically inferred.

Hitchens highlighted that Shelley targeted Creationism by directly attacking the teleological argument, the argument from design, used by both deists and theists.

Shelley pointed out the logical fallacy of intelligent design. Hitchens echoed Shelley's core philosophical point: "The matter in controversy is the existence of design in the Universe, and it is not permitted to assume the contested premises and thence infer the matter in dispute".

He highlighted his literary and lyrical defiance. Hitchens placed Shelley in the tradition of radical, uncompromising freethinkers who used rigorous philosophy and literary brilliance to deconstruct religious assumptions.

Hitchens further discussed Shelley's impact on atheism in his 2004 lecture “The Moral Necessity of Atheism”, which was a reference to Shelley's 1811 essay.

== Sources ==
- Gingerich, S.F. "Shelley's Doctrine of Necessity versus Christianity." PMLA , 1918, Vol. 33, No. 3 (1918), pp. 444–473.
- Harding, Anthony John. "Signs of Change: Percy Shelley's Language of Mutability as Precursor to Darwin's Theory of Evolution." Literature Compass 13.10 (2016): 617–627.
- Hitchens, Christopher. “The Moral Necessity of Atheism”. Lecture delivered at Sewanee, Tennessee: The University of the South. February, 2004.
- Hitchens, Christopher, ed. The Portable Atheist: Essential Readings for the Nonbeliever. Philadelphia, PA : Da Capo, 2007.
- Hogg, Thomas Jefferson. The Life of Percy Bysshe Shelley. In four volumes. Vol. II. London: Edward Moxon, 1858, pp. 484–485.
- Howe, Tony. "Lifting the veil: Shelley, atheism and the wonders of existence". 16 September 2022. The Freethinker.
- Jeaffreson, John Cordy. The Real Shelley. New Views of the Poet's Life. London: Hurst and Blackett, 1885.
- King-Hele, Desmond. "Shelley." Erasmus Darwin and the Romantic Poets. London: Palgrave Macmillan UK, 1986. 187–226.
- King-Hele, Desmond George. "Shelley and science." Notes and records of the Royal Society of London 46.2 (1992): 253–265.
- Paley, William. Evidences of Christianity. London: R. Faulder, 1794.
- Paley, William. Natural Theology: or, Evidences of the Existence and Attributes of the Deity. London: J. Faulder, 1802.
- Shelley, Percy Bysshe. The Necessity of Atheism. 1811. Worthing: Charles and William Phillips.
- Shellley, Percy Bysshe. Frankenstein. Preface. London: Lackington, 1818.
- Shelley, Percy Bysshe. A Refutation of Deism: In a Dialogue. With an Introduction by G.W. Foote. London: Progressive Publishing Company, 1890.
- Singh, Digvijay. "Shelley and Atheism: A Study of Religious Dissent in His Writings." Journal of Research in Humanities and Social Science. Volume 11, Issue 11 (November 2023), pp: 248–254.
- Thomas, Neil. "Shelley, Darwin, and the 19th-Century God Debate." Science & Culture Today. March 13, 2024.
- Williams, Merle A. "Contemplating Facts, Studying Ourselves: Aspects of Shelley’s Philosophical and Religious Prose." In The Unfamiliar Shelley. London: Routledge, 2009.
- Zawierucki, Roland. "'Atheistic,' 'Heretical,' and Christian Elements in the Selected Writings of Percy Bysshe Shelley." (2020). ruj.uj.edu.pl
