= The Acorn and the Pumpkin =

Fable in La Fontaine's Fables

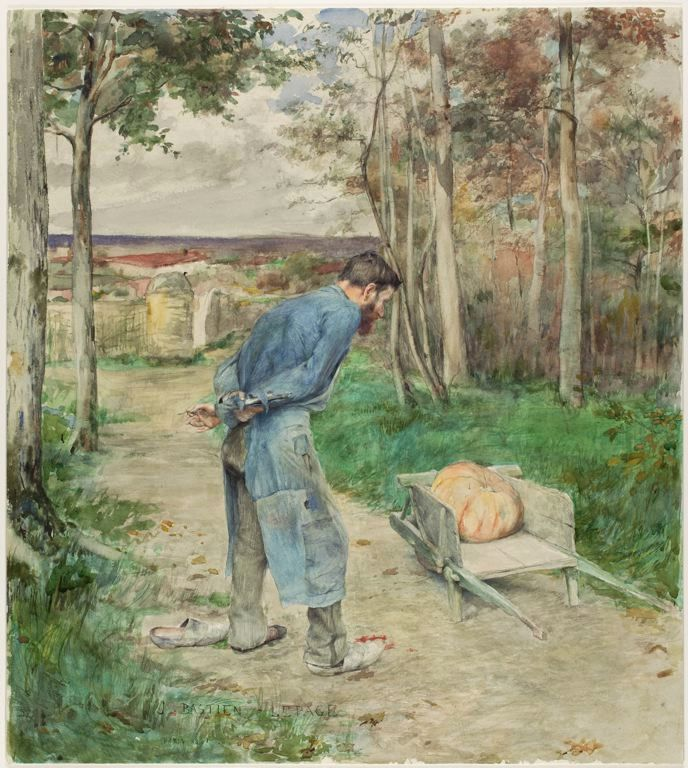
Jules Sebastien-Lepage's illustration of La Fontaine's fable, 1881. Art Institute of Chicago

The Acorn and the Pumpkin, in French Le gland et la citrouille, is one of La Fontaine's Fables, published in his second volume (IX.4) in 1679. In English especially, new versions of the story were written to support the teleological argument for creation favoured by English thinkers from the end of the 17th century onwards.

== Popular theology ==
The fable is one of the few by La Fontaine without a certain origin, although it is generally acknowledged that it owes something to a piece of street farce by Tabarin earlier in the 17th century. Beginning with the statement that "God's creation is well made", it recounts how a country bumpkin questions intelligent design in the creation by supposing that it would be better if oaks bore pumpkins and feeble vines supported acorns. He falls asleep beneath the tree and is awakened by the fall of an acorn, taking the comparative lack of injury he suffers as sufficient evidence of divine providence. It has been surmised, however, that the ironical author's real target is the weakness of such moral reasoning. This appears to be substantiated by the fact that the argument employed is based on a joke in a farce that was not meant to be taken seriously. In the East, the same joke recommended itself to the compilers of similarly ambivalent stories about Nasreddin Hodja.

In England, however, the fable was taken much more seriously as support for the teleological argument being put forward by theologians and philosophers at about that time. Anne Finch, Countess of Winchilsea, was the first to adapt the fable as a polemic against atheism, giving her poem the new title "The Atheist and the Acorn". In place of La Fontaine's introductory reassurance that "God's creation is well made", the poem begins with the opposite proposition, "Methinks this world is oddly made, And every thing’s amiss", as uttered by "a dull presuming atheist". A combative stance replaces genial irony and the piece ends with the grotesque image of a smashed skull letting out its false suppositions.

In his version of La Fontaine in the Select Fables of 1754, Charles Denis returns to the title "The acorn and the pumpkin" and a more lightly nuanced spirit. "Whatever is, is right" is its opening proposition, and the repentant "bumpkin" is finally brought to "give Providence its due". In the same year of 1754, Robert Dodsley included a prose version in the modern fables section of his Select fables of Esop and other fabulists. The piece preserves Anne Finch's title of "The atheist and the acorn" but is otherwise made a light hearted anecdote. It is "one of those refined reasoners, otherwise called Minute Philosophers", who speculates at his ease beneath an oak tree. But he finds, with the circumstance of the falling acorn, "how small a trifle may overturn the systems of mighty philosophers!"

By the end of the 18th century the story was again returned to the sphere of popular theology by Hannah More. She made her poem "The two gardeners" a completely new treatment of the subject and published it as one of her Cheap Repository Tracts in 1797. Two gardeners debate the wisdom of creation and the free thinker becomes convinced that "God is wiser far than me" at the thought of the harm that a shower of "pompions" might have done to his head. Charles Linley the younger (1834–69) was later to rewrite the story of "The acorn and the pumpkin" for children in his Old Saws Newly Set (London 1864), with the same moral purpose. His conclusion is, "With rev'rent glance Creation scan, And learn thy littleness, O Man!" The same solemnity underlies the unascribed prose retelling at the head of the section on creation in yet another work of popular theology, Anecdotes and Examples illustrating the Catholic catechism, published in New York in 1904. The anecdote illustrates the proposition with which it begins, that "The wisdom of God is displayed in creation."

== Wit in translation ==
Less programmatic translations of the fable show the various strategies employed by fellow poets to give a sense of La Fontaine's graceful wit. The French is written in an approximation of irregularly rhyming vers libre of which only Norman R. Shapiro tries to give an idea, although at the expense of often paraphrasing the sense and lacking his original's lightness of touch. Paraphrase without the excuse of reproducing the original style is also the approach of the very first translation of the poem into English by Bernard de Mandeville in 1704. This is written in octosyllabic couplets whose aim is to characterise the "Self conceited Country Bumkin" of the fable. La Fontaine's starting point is deferred by his interpreter to the six-line moral drawn at the end, beginning

The World's vast Fabrick is so well
Contrived by its Creator's Skill;
There's nothing in't, but what is good.

William Trowbridge Larned's version for children is written in four regularly rhymed six-lined stanzas in dactylic metre and tries to give a sense of La Fontaine's light heartedness. Its resulting colloquiality makes the protagonist a little too rustic, replacing as it does the original's simple exclamation "Oh! Oh!" with "Gosh!" and having him refer to himself as "Clever me". Marianne Moore too makes of her adult version more of a recreation than an exact translation. An admirer of her work places this fable among her more successful interpretations, which he judges as "worth putting up as running mates or rivals of the original ... that delight without halting to instruct explicitly".

== Artistic interpretations ==
Jean-Baptiste Oudry's classic illustration of La Fontaine's fable, dating originally from the 1730s, showed the peasant lying face upward asleep beneath an oak. It was this interpretation that was later followed in the 18th century Portuguese tiles illustrating the fables that line the cloisters of the Monastery of São Vicente de Fora in Lisbon. In his line engraving for a 1931 English edition of the fables, Stephen Frederick Gooden preferred to show the rustic philosopher pondering the acorn that has just fallen on his head as he lies beside a pumpkin. On the other hand, in his 1881 watercolour, the French Realist painter Jules Bastien-Lepage has a blue-clad peasant peering at a large pumpkin in a wheelbarrow.
