= God: The Failed Hypothesis =

Book by Victor J. Stenger

- Author: Victor J. Stenger
- Cover artist: PhotoDisc, Inc.
- Language: English
- Publisher: Prometheus Books
- Publication date: 2007
- Publication place: United States
- Media type: Print (Hardcover)
- Pages: 294 pp
- ISBN: 1-59102-481-1
- OCLC: 72988016
- Dewey Decimal: 212/.1 22
- LC Class: BL240.3 .S738 2007
- Preceded by: The Comprehensible Cosmos: Where Do The Laws Of Physics Come From?

God: The Failed Hypothesis is a 2007 non-fiction book by scientist Victor J. Stenger who argues that there is no evidence for the existence of a deity and that God's existence, while not impossible, is improbable.

== Synopsis ==
Stenger writes that when Stephen Jay Gould said religion was outside the reach of science, he was reducing religion to moral philosophy. In contrast, Stenger believes that religion often makes claims that are very much within the abilities of science to investigate. In that vein, he says that science practices methodological naturalism, although it does not rule out the supernatural (i.e. metaphysical naturalism or physicalism), science does restrict itself to testing that which can actually be tested – namely effects in the natural world (be their cause natural or supernatural).

Stenger believes we have more than enough evidence of absence of the Judeo-Christian-Islamic God. He adds that many arguments for God that were once compelling are now weak or irrelevant in light of modern scientific understanding. Stenger does not think we should be dogmatic about disbelief in God, but says the evidence is overwhelmingly against the belief. He is also critical of fine-tuning and fine-tuned universe arguments, and says they misunderstand the more reasonable weak anthropic principle.

== Praise ==
David Ludden of Skeptic magazine wrote that "Stenger lays out the evidence from cosmology, astrophysics, nuclear physics, particle physics, statistical mechanics and quantum mechanics showing that the universe appears exactly as it should if there is no creator." Ludden concluded "All freethinkers should have both volumes The God Delusion and God: The Failed Hypothesis, side by side, on their bookshelves."

Damien Broderick wrote in The Australian, "Stenger offers an answer to that deep question in his two new books, arguing a materialist, God-free account of the cosmos, equally antagonistic to superstition, to the paranormal and to religions archetypal and newfangled alike. He refuses to accept the polite accommodation urged by agnostic Stephen Jay Gould that science and religion can never be in conflict as they are non-overlapping 'magisteria'."

== See also ==
- Omnipotence paradox
- Problem of evil
- Teleological argument#Fine-tuned universe
