= Replicative transposition =

Replicative transposition is a mechanism of transposition in molecular biology, proposed by James A. Shapiro in 1979, in which the transposable element is duplicated during the reaction, so that the transposing entity is a copy of the original element. In this mechanism, the donor and receptor DNA sequences form a characteristic intermediate "theta" configuration, sometimes called a "Shapiro intermediate". Replicative transposition is characteristic to retrotransposons and occurs from time to time in class II transposons.
