= Victor J. Stenger =

American particle physicist, author, and religious skeptic (1935–2014)

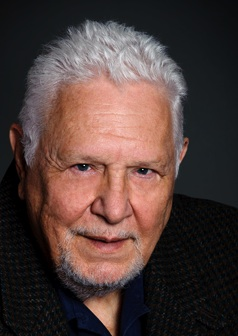
- Victor J. Stenger in 2011
- Born: January 29, 1935; Bayonne, New Jersey, U.S.
- Died: August 25, 2014 (aged 79); Honolulu, Hawaii, U.S.
- Education: New Jersey Institute of Technology, UCLA
- Spouse: Phylliss Marcia (Black) Stenger (m. 1962)
- Children: Noelle Green, Victor Andrew
- Scientific career
- Fields: Particle physics, philosophy
- Thesis: Low Energy K+d Scattering and the I=0 KN Interaction (1963)
- Doctoral advisor: Harold K. Ticho

Victor John Stenger (/ˈstɛŋɡər/; January 29, 1935 – August 25, 2014) was an American particle physicist, philosopher, author, and religious skeptic.

Following a career as a research scientist in the field of particle physics, Stenger was associated with New Atheism and he authored popular science books. He published twelve books for general audiences on physics, quantum mechanics, cosmology, philosophy, religion, atheism, and pseudoscience, including the 2007 best-seller God: The Failed Hypothesis: How Science Shows That God Does Not Exist. His final book was God and the Multiverse: Humanity's Expanding View of the Cosmos (2014). He was a regular featured science columnist for the Huffington Post.

An advocate for removing the influence of religion from scientific research, commercial activity, and the political process, Stenger coined the quote: "Science flies you to the moon. Religion flies you into buildings" (a reference to the September 11 attacks).

== Personal life ==
Victor J. Stenger was born on January 29, 1935, and raised in a working-class neighborhood of Bayonne, New Jersey. His father was a Lithuanian immigrant, and his mother was the daughter of Hungarian immigrants. He died on August 25, 2014, at the age of 79.

== Career ==
=== Education and employment ===
Stenger attended public schools in Bayonne, New Jersey, and received a Bachelor of Science in electrical engineering from Newark College of Engineering (later the New Jersey Institute of Technology). He then moved to Los Angeles on a Hughes Aircraft Company fellowship, earning a Master of Science and PhD in physics from UCLA.

He was a member of the Department of Physics at the University of Hawaii until his 2000 retirement. He held visiting positions on the faculties of the University of Heidelberg in Germany and Oxford University (twice) and was a visiting researcher at Rutherford Appleton Laboratory in England, the National Nuclear Physics Laboratory in Frascati, Italy, and the University of Florence in Italy. He served as an adjunct professor of philosophy at the University of Colorado at Boulder.

=== Scientist ===
Stenger's first peer-reviewed work was published in 1964, and his research career continued until his retirement in 2000. His research involved work that determined the properties of gluons, quarks, strange particles, and neutrinos. Stenger focused on neutrino astronomy and very high-energy gamma rays.

=== Philosopher and skeptic ===
Stenger was an advocate of philosophical naturalism, skepticism, and atheism, and wrote several books and papers about the relationship between science and religion. He was a prominent critic of intelligent design and the aggressive use of the anthropic principle. He maintained that if consciousness and free will do exist, they will eventually be explained in a scientific manner that invokes neither the mystical nor the supernatural. He criticized those who invoke the perplexities of quantum mechanics in support of the paranormal, mysticism, or supernatural phenomena, writing several books and articles to debunk contemporary pseudoscience.

Stenger took part in the 2008 "Origins Conference" hosted by the Skeptics Society at the California Institute of Technology and debated Hugh Ross on the topic of whether science supports belief in existence of God.

In 1992, Uri Geller sued Stenger and Prometheus Books for $4 million, claiming defamation for questioning his "psychic powers." The suit was dismissed and Geller was ordered to pay court costs.

Astronomer Luke Barnes argued in a 2012 paper that many of Stenger's claims about fine-tuning were problematic and that his arguments were fallacious. Stenger responded that Barnes misunderstood and misrepresented his positions.

== Professional and community positions ==
- President, 1990–1994, Hawaiian Humanists
- Member of Editorial Board, Free Inquiry
- Member of Society of Humanist Philosophers
- Fellow of the Committee for Skeptical Inquiry
- Fellow of the Center for Inquiry
- President, 2002–2006, Colorado Citizens for Science

== Publications by Stenger ==
=== Books for general audiences ===
- Not by Design: The Origin of the Universe, Prometheus Books, 1988, p. 202, ISBN 978-0-87975-451-8, archived from the original on 2014-08-12
- Physics and Psychics: The Search for a World Beyond the Senses, Prometheus Books, 1990, p. 323, ISBN 978-0-87975-575-1, archived from the original on 2014-10-19
- The Unconscious Quantum: Metaphysics in Modern Physics and Cosmology, Prometheus Books, 1995, pp. 322, ISBN 978-1-57392-022-3
- Timeless Reality: Symmetry, Simplicity, and Multiple Universes, Prometheus Books, 2000, p. 396, ISBN 978-1-57392-859-5, archived from the original on 2014-08-12
- Has Science Found God? The Latest Results in the Search for Purpose in the Universe, Prometheus Books, 2003, p. 373, ISBN 978-1-59102-018-9, archived from the original on 2014-10-19
- The Comprehensible Cosmos: Where Do the Laws of Physics Come From?, Prometheus Books, 2006, pp. 340, ISBN 978-1-59102-424-8
- God: The Failed Hypothesis: How Science Shows That God Does Not Exist, Prometheus Books, 2007, p. 287, ISBN 978-1-59102-481-1, archived from the original on 2014-08-12
- Quantum Gods: Creation, Chaos, and the Search for Cosmic Consciousness, Prometheus Books, 2009, p. 292, ISBN 978-1-59102-713-3, archived from the original on 2014-08-12
- The New Atheism: Taking a Stand for Science and Reason, Prometheus Books, 2009, p. 282, ISBN 978-1-59102-751-5, archived from the original on 2014-08-12
- The Fallacy of Fine-Tuning: Why the Universe Is Not Designed for Us, Prometheus Books, 2011, p. 345, ISBN 978-1-61614-443-2, archived from the original on 2014-08-12
- God and the Folly of Faith: The Incompatibility of Science and Religion, Prometheus Books, 2012, p. 408, ISBN 978-1-61614-599-6, archived from the original on 2014-08-12
- God and the Atom, Prometheus Books, 2013, p. 300, ISBN 978-1-61614-753-2, archived from the original on 2014-08-12
- God and the Multiverse, Prometheus Books, 2014, p. 447, ISBN 978-1-61614-970-3

=== Peer-reviewed articles ===
- Stenger, Victor; Slater, W. E.; Stork, D. H.; Ticho, H. K. (June 1964), "K−N Interaction in the I=0 State at Low Energies", Physical Review, 134 (B1111): B1111–B1123, Bibcode:1964PhRv..134.1111S, doi:10.1103/PhysRev.134.B1111
- Stenger, Victor (15 September 1984), "The Production of Very High Energy Photons and Neutrinos from Cosmic Proton Sources", The Astrophysical Journal, 284: 810–816, Bibcode:1984ApJ...284..810S, doi:10.1086/162463
- Stenger, Victor (3 October 1985), "Photinos from Cosmic Sources", Nature, 317 (6036): 411–413, Bibcode:1985Natur.317..411S, doi:10.1038/317411a0, S2CID 4312378
- Stenger, Victor (March–April 1986), "The Extraterrestrial Flux Sensitivity of Underground and Undersea Muon Detectors", Il Nuovo Cimento C, 9 (2): 479–487, Bibcode:1986NCimC...9..479S, doi:10.1007/BF02514866, S2CID 120549196
- Stenger, Victor (July 1990), "The Universe: the ultimate free lunch", European Journal of Physics, 11 (4): 236–243, Bibcode:1990EJPh...11..236S, doi:10.1088/0143-0807/11/4/008, S2CID 250784194
- Stenger, Victor (1999), "Bioenergetic Fields", The Scientific Review of Alternative Medicine, 3 (1), archived from the original on 2016-03-03
- Stenger, Victor (2000), "Natural Explanations for the Anthropic Coincidences" (PDF), Philo, 3 (2): 50–67, doi:10.5840/philo20003216, archived from the original (PDF) on 2014-04-11

=== Other essays ===
- Stenger, Victor (May–June 1993), "The Myth of Quantum Consciousness" (PDF), The Humanist, vol. 53, pp. 13–15, archived from the original (PDF) on 2011-06-06
- Stenger, Victor (1996), "New Age Physics: Has Science Found the Path to the Ultimate?" (PDF), Free Inquiry, vol. 16, no. 3, pp. 7–11, archived from the original (PDF) on 2015-09-24
- Stenger, Victor (1996), "Cosmythology: Was the Universe Designed to Produce Us?", Skeptic, vol. 4, no. 2, pp. 36–40
- Stenger, Victor (1996), "Quantum Metaphysics", in Brown, Laurence; Farr, Bernard; Hoffmann, Joseph (eds.), Modern Spiritualities: An Inquiry, Prometheus Books, pp. 243–253
- Stenger, Victor (1998), "Has Science Found God?", Free Inquiry, vol. 19, no. 1, pp. 56–58, archived from the original on 2010-07-06
- Stenger, Victor (1999), "The Anthropic Coincidences: A Natural Explanation", Skeptical Intelligencer, vol. 3, no. 3, pp. 2–17
- Stenger, Victor (July–August 1999), "Anthropic Design: Does the Cosmos Show Evidence of Purpose?", Skeptical Inquirer, vol. 23, no. 4, pp. 40–63, archived from the original on 2005-12-05
- Ramey, David; Stenger, Victor (1999), "Energy Medicine", Consumer's Guide to Alternative Therapies in the Horse, Howell Book House, pp. 55–66, ISBN 978-1582450629
- Stenger, Victor (2000), "The Pseudophysics of Therapeutic Touch", in Scheiber, Béla; Selby, Carla (eds.), Therapeutic Touch, Prometheus Books, pp. 302–311, ISBN 978-1-57392-804-5
- Stenger, Victor (2000), Intelligent Design: The New Stealth Creationism (PDF), archived from the original (PDF) on 2012-08-31
- Stenger, Victor (2001), "Humanity in Time and Space", Free Inquiry, vol. 21, no. 2, pp. 42–69
- Stenger, Victor (2001), "Time's Arrows Point Both Ways: The View From Nowhen" (PDF), Skeptic, vol. 8, no. 4, pp. 90–95, archived from the original (PDF) on 2012-06-23
- Stenger, Victor (September–October 2001), "The God of Falling Bodies", Skeptical Inquirer, vol. 25, no. 5, pp. 46–49, archived from the original on 2017-07-13
- Stenger, Victor (2001), "The Breath of God: Identifying Spiritual Force", in Kurtz, Paul (ed.), Skeptical Odysseys, Prometheus Books, pp. 363–374, ISBN 978-1-57392-884-7
- Stenger, Victor (2003), "Anthropic Design: Does the Cosmos Show Evidence of Purpose?", in Kurtz, Paul (ed.), Science and Religion: Are They Compatible?, Prometheus Books, pp. 47–49, ISBN 978-1-59102-064-6
- Stenger, Victor (2003), "The Premise Keepers", Free Inquiry, vol. 23, no. 3
- Stenger, Victor (2004), "Is the Universe Fine-Tuned for Us?", in Young, Matt; Edis, Taner (eds.), Why Intelligent Design Fails: A Scientific Critique of the New Creationism, Rutgers University Press, pp. 172–184, ISBN 978-0813538723
- Stenger, Victor (2005), "Flew's Flawed Science", Free Inquiry, vol. 25, no. 2, pp. 17–18, archived from the original on 2006-05-02
- Stenger, Victor (2006), "The Scientific Case Against a God Who Created the Universe", in Martin, Michael; Monnier, Ricki (eds.), The Improbability of God, Prometheus Books, ISBN 978-1-59102-381-4
- Stenger, Victor (2006), "Do Our Values Come from God? The Evidence Says No" (PDF), Free Inquiry, vol. 26, no. 5, pp. 42–45, archived from the original (PDF) on 2014-02-25
- Stenger, Victor (2006), "A Scenario for a Natural Origin of Our Universe" (PDF), Philo, vol. 9, no. 2, pp. 93–102, arXiv:0710.3137
- Stenger, Victor (2007), "Clock Time", in Darity, William (ed.), International Encyclopedia of the Social Sciences, 2nd Edition, Macmillan Reference USA, ISBN 978-0028661179
- Stenger, Victor (2007), "Reality", in Darity, William (ed.), International Encyclopedia of the Social Sciences, 2nd Edition, Macmillan Reference USA, ISBN 978-0028661179
- Stenger, Victor (2008), "Physics, Cosmology, and the New Creationism", in Petto, Andrew; Godfrey, Laurie (eds.), Scientists Confront Creationism: Intelligent Design and Beyond, W. W. Norton & Company, Inc., ISBN 978-0-393-33073-1
- Stenger, Victor (March 2008), "Is the Brain a Quantum Device?", Skeptical Briefs, vol. 18, no. 1, pp. 9, 13
- Stenger, Victor (2008), "Where Can God Act? The New Quantum Theology", Free Inquiry, vol. 28, no. 5, pp. 1–36
- Stenger, Victor (2009), "Time, Arrow of", in Birx, H. James (ed.), Encyclopedia of Time: Science, Philosophy, Theology, & Culture, SAGE Publications, Inc, ISBN 978-1412941648
- Stenger, Victor (2009), "Time, Asymmetry of", in Birx, H. James (ed.), Encyclopedia of Time: Science, Philosophy, Theology, & Culture, SAGE Publications, Inc, ISBN 978-1412941648
- Stenger, Victor (2009), "Time, Operational Definition of", in Birx, H. James (ed.), Encyclopedia of Time: Science, Philosophy, Theology, & Culture, SAGE Publications, Inc, ISBN 978-1412941648
- Stenger, Victor (2009), "Universe, Origin of", in Birx, H. James (ed.), Encyclopedia of Time: Science, Philosophy, Theology, & Culture, SAGE Publications, Inc, ISBN 978-1412941648
- Stenger, Victor (2009), "Planck time", in Birx, H. James (ed.), Encyclopedia of Time: Science, Philosophy, Theology, & Culture, SAGE Publications, Inc, ISBN 978-1412941648
- Stenger, Victor (2009), "Time, Symmetry of", in Birx, H. James (ed.), Encyclopedia of Time: Science, Philosophy, Theology, & Culture, SAGE Publications, Inc, ISBN 978-1412941648
- Stenger, Victor (2009), "Time, Units of", in Birx, H. James (ed.), Encyclopedia of Time: Science, Philosophy, Theology, & Culture, SAGE Publications, Inc, ISBN 978-1412941648
- Stenger, Victor (2012), "Free Will and Autonomous Will", Skeptic, vol. 17, no. 4, pp. 15–19

=== Columnist ===
From 1998 to 2011 Stenger wrote for the column "Reality Check," in Skeptical Briefs, the quarterly newsletter of the Committee for Skeptical Inquiry (CSI).

Since August 2010, he was also a regularly featured science columnist for the Huffington Post.

== Pantheon of skeptics ==
Stenger has been included in CSI's Pantheon of Skeptics. The Pantheon of Skeptics was created by CSI to remember the legacy of deceased fellows of CSI and their contributions to the cause of scientific skepticism.
