= George N. Schlesinger =

Hungarian philosopher, rabbi, and author (1925–2013)

George Nathan Schlesinger (Nov 7, 1925 – June 27, 2013) was a philosopher, rabbi, and author. He made major contributions in the areas of philosophy of religion, and philosophy of science. He taught and conducted research as a professor of philosophy at the University of North Carolina at Chapel Hill, from 1967 to 1999, and as a visiting professor at several other universities. His teaching and research interests included philosophy of time, philosophy of logic, and theism. He authored 10 books and more than 300 articles, earned many awards, and gave many presentations as a sought after speaker. His presentations at a summer conference resulted in the Philosophy of Time Society. This society is still active to this date. Schlesinger was also an ordained rabbi, and authored many articles in the area of philosophy of Judaism. He led services, and taught at the University of North Carolina Hillel, as well as yeshivas and synagogues in England, Australia, and Israel. As an author, he has been largely collected by libraries worldwide.

== Early life and Yeshiva education ==
George Schlesinger, whose Hebrew name is Harav Nattan ben Harav Shmuel, was born in Budapest, Hungary on November 7, 1925. In the late 1930s, before World War II, the Nazis were approaching Hungary. In 1939, at the age of 13 or 14, Schlesinger, his brother, and parents were able to obtain a visa and escape to Palestine.

They settled in Bnei Brak, living next door to Rav Karelitz, who later became famous and known as the Hazon Ish. Schlesinger later studied at the Yeshiva Kol Torah and the Chevron Yeshiva. At 23, Schlesinger worked as a Rosh Yeshiva (teacher) at Yeshivat Bnei Akiva in Kfar ha-Roeh. He was soon thereafter ordained as a Rabbi in 1948. In 1950 at Kfar ha-Roeh, he met his wife, Shulamit.

== Secular studies ==
Unlike many of the other Yeshiva students, Schlesinger had a desire to study English and secular studies in addition to his Torah learning. Shortly after getting married, Schlesinger and his wife, Shulamit, moved to England. He taught at a Jewish institution in Manchester, England. He went on to receive his B.Sc. and M.Sc in Physics at the University of London. Schlesinger and his wife then moved to Australia. He received his PhD in Philosophy from the University of Melbourne in 1959.

== Career ==
In Melbourne, Schlesinger helped run a network of orthodox schools and published a periodical for children and parents. He also was a volunteer rabbi in Canberra, Australia where his son David was born. After receiving his PhD, he taught at the Australian National University, in Canberra from 1960 until 1967, and reached the rank of Reader, equivalent to a full professor.

=== Philosophy professor at University of North Carolina ===
In 1967, Schlesinger moved from Australia to North Carolina, where he began teaching and conducting research as a professor of philosophy at the University of North Carolina in Chapel Hill. He continued to work at the university until his retirement in 1999. During the time he was at the University of North Carolina, he was also a visiting professor many times at the Bar-Ilan University in Israel. He was also a visiting professor at several other universities, including University of Minnesota, the University of Pittsburgh, and the University of Texas.

His main areas of teaching and research at Chapel Hill, were philosophy of religion, and philosophy of science. He was particularly interested in confirmation theory, philosophy of physics, and philosophy of time. He taught a course on space and time jointly with physics professor Hendrik van Dam. As a professor, Schlesinger won many awards including, in 1975, the university wide Tanner Award "in recognition of excellence in inspiractional teaching". In 1990, UNC's Dialectic and Philanthropic Societies presented him with the Henry Horace Williams Award for excellence in undergraduate teaching.

While at Chapel Hill, Schlesinger also gave talks at the University Hillel. He and his son David would attend services on Friday night and Saturday, walking in the opposite direction of everyone else going to the football games.

== Publications ==
Schlesinger wrote many books and articles in the areas of philosophy of religion, theism, the problem of evil, philosophy of science, philosophy of time, philosophy of logic, philosophy of physics, metaphysics, philosophy of probability, philosophy of language, and ethics.

His books include Aspects of Time, Intelligibility of Nature, Metaphysics:Methods and Problems, New Perspectives on Old-Time Religion, Range of Epistemic Logic, Religion and the Scientific Method, The Sweep of Probability, and Timely Topics. Schlesinger also contributed towards books written by others, including Challenge: Torah Views on Science and Its Problems and Science in the Light of Torah.

His articles appear in many well known Philosophical Journals, including The Philosophical Quarterly, Analysis, Mind, Philosophical Studies, Religious Studies, and the International Journal for Philosophy of Religion. His work also appears in Judaic Journals including Chai Today, and Tradition.

=== Philosophy of religion ===
Schlesinger wrote many books and articles in the area of philosophy of religion. He argued very strongly in favor of theism - that there is one and only one infinitely powerful creator of the universe who plays an active role in the world and in our lives. His work focused on examining and analyzing all the arguments in favor and against theism. In his work, many questions are discussed and answered, such as why the world was created in such a way that we have evil and suffering. His work also focused on the logic of belief, including why some would not believe in theism.

Schlesinger wrote that there is overwhelming evidence in favor of a creator, such as how fine-tuned the universe is in order to support life. He wrote that although the creator is all powerful, just like it is impossible to name the highest integer, it is not possible to create a world which gives the highest desirable state to its inhabitants. In his article, "The First Commandment," he wrote that we are born with a yearning towards a higher power. However, those who are dishonest with others, are also dishonest with themselves, and this self-deception leads many to be non-believers and block out any yearning for a higher power.

Schlesinger believed that whether or not to believe in a creator, was a very important decision we would make. Our entire philosophy of life would derive from this fundamental decision. Schlesinger believed we would be betting our life on whatever we decide. Schlesinger defended Pascal's Wager, authoring an article with Dr. William Lycan entitled "Pascal's wager defended". In this article, Schlesinger and Lycan answered the "many Gods" challenge to Pascal's wager.

In his article, "The Problem of Evil and the Problem of Injustice," Schlesinger wrote that the problem of why there is evil and suffering in the world vanishes when one considers the characteristics of the world the creator wished to maximize. These characteristics include the opportunities for man to do good.

Schlesinger examined theories as to why there is suffering and then proposed his own theory. He argued that the purpose of suffering can not be punishment as those who do not deserve punishment sometimes suffer. He also argued against reincarnation and suffering based on actions in a previous life, as there is no purpose to the punishment if we cannot remember or be aware of our previous lives, if they exist. He proposed his own theory which is that the world was created in order to increase the opportunities for man to do good, which includes a virtuous response to suffering.

Schlesinger wrote books on the topic of philosophy of religion. These include New Perspectives on Old-Time Religion, which contains Schlesinger's ideas and analysis of the logic and philosophy of religious beliefs. In this book, Schlesinger presents a strong defense of theism, which includes answering arguments against theism, such as why there is evil and suffering in the world. Schlesinger also discusses divine attributes in this book, and his belief they are all vs the belief they are separate.

In his book, Religion and the Scientific Method, Schlesinger argues that there may be more than one way to acquire knowledge, not only the methods in use by working scientists. In this book, he discusses how those engaged in religious studies can defend the methods that they use even when they are not the same as those in use by scientists. He discusses evidence in favor of theism, and why the existence of evil and suffering in the world is not evidence against theism. In this book, Schlesinger illustrates that reflections on religion lead us to consider almost every other topic in philosophy.

=== Philosophy of time ===
Schlesinger was very focused on time. He pointed out some very interesting ideas about time such as the fact that in a universe without events there is no time. Schlesinger pointed out that events depend on time and time depends on events.

Schlesinger wrote many articles analyzing and commenting on the dynamic philosophy of time vs the static philosophy of time. Schlesinger described the dynamic philosophy of time as events that move from the future into the NOW, and then further and further away into the past. In the static view of time, events and moments stay fixed in position. Although most analytic philosophers support the static philosophy of time, Schlesinger argued in numerous articles that we should not be so quick to abandon the dynamic philosophy of time. Schlesinger would often point out the differences between the nature of time and the nature of space. Schlesinger would point out that unlike the dimensions of space, time is dynamic. This is different than the focus of modern physics that time and space are interwoven and one of the same.

Schlesinger offered a Philosophy of Time seminar during the summer of 1991. From this seminar, came the Philosophy of Time Society that continues to exist to this date. The society is affiliated with the American Philosophical Association.

In his book, Aspects of Time, Schlesinger discusses similarities and differences between the spatial dimensions and time. He also discusses temporal becoming, the direction of time, and backward causation.

=== Philosophy of logic ===
Schlesinger wrote many articles and a book on the logic of knowledge and belief (epistemic logic). He analyzed many interesting questions. In the article "The Credibility of Extraordinary Events", he discussed how believable it is that a rare event occurred when it is reported by a witness with variable trustworthiness. In the article, "Confirmability and Determinism", he discussed whether the total amount of confirmation we have (or could have) is sufficient to believe certain things are true, such as whether or not causation and determinism is true throughout the universe. In the article, "Do we have to be justified in our beliefs", he discussed how people hold on to core beliefs no matter what the evidence says.

In his book, "Range of Epistemic Logic", Schlesinger uses probability theory and epistemic logic to solve problems in philosophical thought. Schlesinger's main theme in this book, is that Epistemic Logic can be profitably applied with a small logical investment. In this book, he applies epistemic logic to "Descartes dream argument, issues of privileged access, fallibilism, scepticism, understanding, confirmation, and the confirmation criterion of maningfulness".

=== Philosophy of life ===
Schlesinger had a philosophy of life: Attitude and how we react, is what determines our happiness and success in life, rather than the actual events in our life. In many articles Schlesinger offered advice, illustrated with stories.

Schlesinger believed that the words we speak are very powerful and we need to be very careful with what we say. In his article, "Silence is a Fence for Reason," Schlesinger offers the advice to "know what we say", but "only say what we know". In this article, Schlesinger discussed the difference between intelligence and wisdom. If we have a high IQ, but let everyone know, then we do not have wisdom

Schlesinger believed that good character was very important. He defined humility as being aware of one's assets, but not believing they are more important than anyone else's assets. Rabbi Schlesinger would often illustrate good character with a story. He described a self-centered person as one who puts on a jacket when it is cold, rather than building a fire

=== Other ===
Schlesinger wrote articles and books on many other topics. In the book, "Metaphysics, Methods and Problems," he wrote on abstract concepts including existence, objects, space, time, and cause & effect. In the book, "Intelligibility of Nature", Schlesinger writes on the principle of essential connectivity, present and absent properties, and the elements of the universe. In the book, "The Sweep of Probability," Schlesinger applied probability to philosophical problems and life in general. Topics included in the book include confirmation, credibility of witnesses, randomness, and others. In this book, Schlesinger wrote about improbable events, and what would make them extraordinary and warrant our interest. Schlesinger would say that a particular serial number showing up on a bill would be improbable, but it would not be extraordinary. However, if someone was able to guess the entire number correctly, that would be both improbable and extraordinary.

== Family life ==
Schlesinger and his wife, Shulamith, have a son, David, and a daughter-in-law, Linda. There are 4 grandchildren, Avishai, Ariav, Efroni, and Eliana. David and Linda currently live in Memphis. Avishai, Ariav and Efroni - and most recently Eliana - have made aliyah and live in Israel. Efroni authored the book, A Year of Divrei Torah, edited by Linda Schlesinger, and published in 2012. Linda Schlesinger authored the book, Torah Sage in Our Midst, published in 2015 about the well-known Rabbi Efraim Greenblatt who lived in Memphis and later moved to Israel.
