= L. Nathan Oaklander =

L. Nathan Oaklander is a retired American philosopher specializing in philosophy of time. He worked for University of Michigan - Flint. He defends the B-theory of time, and has co-authored with Quentin Smith. Oaklander studied philosophy at the University of Iowa. He is a student of Gustav Bergmann.
