= Natural genetic engineering =

Concept in biological evolution

Natural genetic engineering (NGE) is a class of process proposed by molecular biologist James A. Shapiro to account for novelty created in the course of biological evolution. Shapiro developed this work in several peer-reviewed publications from 1992 onwards, and later in his 2011 book Evolution: A View from the 21st Century, which has been updated with a second edition in 2022. He uses NGE to account for several proposed counterexamples to the central dogma of molecular biology (Francis Crick's proposal of 1957 that the direction of the flow of sequence information is only from nucleic acid to proteins, and never the reverse). Shapiro drew from work as diverse as the adaptivity of the mammalian immune system, ciliate macronuclei and epigenetics. The work gained some measure of notoriety after being championed by proponents of Intelligent Design, despite Shapiro's explicit repudiation of that movement.

== Concept ==
Shapiro first laid out his ideas of natural genetic engineering in 1992 and has continued to develop them in both the primary scientific literature and in work directed to wider audiences, culminating in the 2011 publication of Evolution: A View from the 21st Century (second edition in 2022.).

Natural genetic engineering is a reaction against the modern synthesis and the central dogma of molecular biology. The modern synthesis was formulated before the elucidation of the double-helix structure of DNA and the establishment of molecular biology in its current status of prominence. Given what was known at the time a simple, powerful model of genetic change through undirected mutation (loosely described as "random") and natural selection, was seen as sufficient to explain evolution as observed in nature. With the discovery of the nature and roles of nucleic acids in genetics, this model prompted Francis Crick's so-called Central Dogma of Molecular Biology: "[Sequential] information cannot be transferred back from protein to either protein or nucleic acid."

Shapiro points out that multiple cellular systems can affect DNA in response to specific environmental stimuli. These "directed" changes stand in contrast to both the undirected mutations in the modern synthesis and (in Shapiro's interpretation) the ban on information flowing from the environment into the genome.

In the 1992 Genetica paper that introduced the concept, Shapiro begins by listing three lessons from molecular genetics:

- there is a surprising amount of genetic conservation across taxonomic boundaries,
- the mosaic structure of the genome results in multiple nonlocal genes having multiple phylogenic effects, and, drawing on the work of his friend and collaborator Barbara McClintock,
- the existence of multiple cellular mechanisms (including mobile genetic elements) that can restructure DNA.

From these, Shapiro concludes:

[I]t can be argued that much of genome change in evolution results from a genetic engineering process utilizing the biochemical systems for mobilizing and reorganizing DNA structures present in living cells.

== Relation with Intelligent Design ==
In a 1997 Boston Review article, Shapiro lists four categories of discoveries made in molecular biology that, in his estimation, are not adequately accounted for by the Modern Synthesis: genome organization, cellular repair capabilities, mobile genetic elements and cellular information processing. Shapiro concludes:

What significance does an emerging interface between biology and information science hold for thinking about evolution? It opens up the possibility of addressing scientifically rather than ideologically the central issue so hotly contested by fundamentalists on both sides of the Creationist-Darwinist debate: Is there any guiding intelligence at work in the origin of species displaying exquisite adaptations that range from lambda prophage repression and the Krebs cycle through the mitotic apparatus and the eye to the immune system, mimicry, and social organization?

Within the context of the article in particular and Shapiro's work on Natural Genetic Engineering in general, the "guiding intelligence" is to be found within the cell. (For example, in a Huffington Post essay entitled Cell Cognition and Cell Decision-Making Shapiro defines cognitive actions as those that are "knowledge-based and involve decisions appropriate to acquired information," arguing that cells meet this criterion.) However, the combination of disagreement with the Modern Synthesis and discussion of a creative intelligence has brought his work to the attention of advocates of Intelligent Design.

Natural genetic engineering has been cited as a legitimate scientific controversy (in contrast to the controversies raised by various branches of creationism). While Shapiro considers the questions raised by Intelligent Design to be interesting, he parts ways with creationists by considering these problems to be scientifically tractable (specifically by understanding how NGE plays a role in the evolution of novelty).

With the publication of Evolution: A View from the 21st Century, Shapiro's work again came under discussion in the Intelligent design community. In a conversation with Shapiro, William Dembski asked for Shapiro's thoughts on the origins of natural genetic engineering systems. Shapiro replied that "where they come from in the first place is not a question we can realistically answer right now." While Dembski sees this position as at least not inconsistent with Intelligent Design, Shapiro has explicitly and repeatedly rejected both creationism in general and Intelligent Design in particular.

== Criticism ==
While Shapiro developed NGE in the peer-reviewed literature, the idea attracted far more attention when he summarized his work in his book Evolution: A View from the 21st Century. In part due to its discussion of the Intelligent Design movement, the book was widely and critically reviewed. Criticism falls into two main categories:

1. That the theory crosses the line into teleology, a line exemplified by the review written by Larry Moran. The form of Shapiro's argument has points of resemblance to several creationist arguments to the effect that observed biology cannot be explained by a combination of "random" (undirected) mutation and natural selection. One of the many standard responses to these arguments is that biology can be sufficiently explained without invoking higher causes. Shapiro's view differs significantly from that of creationists, not the least because his higher causes exist only at the level of cellular machinery. However, to a critic unpersuaded of the need for higher causes, it is not persuasive to substitute material higher causes for the supernatural.
2. That Shapiro does not give a fair reading of the central dogma. Shapiro's reading of the central dogma requires that only random mutations can be the root of evolutionary change. If this reading is correct, then, ignoring the looseness of such an application of the term "random", the several mechanisms identified by Shapiro (e.g., epigenetics) do indeed falsify this theory. However, Crick and geneticists in general had long been well aware of the existence of mutagens at the time of the formulation and restatement of the central dogma, and in fact before the discovery of the mechanisms of biological heredity. A more conservative interpretation, in the words of Marshall Nirenberg, is simply that "DNA makes RNA makes protein." Under this reading, proteins would not be expected to modify DNA, but Shapiro provides multiple examples of where this occurs, including histone modification, mutagenic subclasses of excision and repair enzymes, extensive regulation of mobile genetic elements, and various classes of RNA regulation, and direct modification of nucleotides via cytosine methylation and enzymatic deamination.

Shapiro responded to the review in Evolutionary Intelligence.

== See also ==
- Mutation bias
- Mutationism
