= James A. Shapiro =

American biologist

- Born: 18 May 1943 (age 83)
- Education: Harvard University; Corpus Christi College, Cambridge
- Known for: Natural genetic engineering, first isolation of a gene, cooperative behavior in bacteria, pattern formation
- Awards: Marshall Scholarship (1964-1966), Darwin Prize (University of Edinburgh) 1993, AAAS Fellow 1994, Honorary OBE 2001
- Scientific career
- Fields: Microbiology, Molecular Biology, Genetics, Biochemistry
- Workplaces: University of Chicago; Postdoctoral Fellow at the Institut Pasteur, France; Harvard Medical School; Brandeis University; Visiting Professor at Tel Aviv University and the University of Edinburgh, Scotland; Visiting Fellow at Churchill College, Cambridge University, England

James Alan Shapiro (born May 18, 1943) is an American biologist, an expert in bacterial genetics and a professor emeritus in the Department of Biochemistry and Molecular Biology at the University of Chicago.

== Academic biography ==
Shapiro obtained his bachelor's degree in English from Harvard College in 1964. Then, inspired by a genetics course he had taken as a senior, he shifted from English to science. He was awarded a Marshall Scholarship for postgraduate research at Corpus Christi College, Cambridge, from 1964 to 1967, spending his final year at Hammersmith hospital under the supervision of William Hayes, and being awarded a PhD in genetics in 1968. His thesis, The Structure of the Galactose Operon in Escherichia coli K12, contains the first suggestion of transposable elements in bacteria. He confirmed this hypothesis in 1968 during his postdoctoral tenure as a Jane Coffin Childs fellow in the laboratory of François Jacob at the Institut Pasteur in Paris.

As an American Cancer Society fellow in Jon Beckwith’s laboratory at the Harvard Medical School 1968-70, he and his colleagues used in vivo genetic manipulations to clone and purify the lac operon of E. coli.

He was troubled by the potential genetic engineering applications of his research.

He served as Invited Professor in the School of Biological Sciences at the University of Havana, Cuba 1970-1972, before returning to another postdoctorate with Harlyn Halvorson at Brandeis University. Since 1973, he has worked as a professor of microbiology at the University of Chicago.

In 1975 Shapiro attended the ICN-UCLA Squaw Valley Symposium on Bacterial Plasmids, where his interest in DNA restructuring in bacteria was heightened by learning about the movements of antibiotic resistance transposons to new genomic locations. This prompted him to organize, in collaboration with Sankar Adhya and the late Ahmed Bukhari, the first meeting on the topic of DNA insertion elements at Cold Spring Harbor Laboratory in 1976. Although they expected only a few colleagues, the meeting was attended by over 150 scientists from around the world, including Barbara McClintock. McClintock had first identified transposition (horizontal gene transfer) (movement to new genomic location) of DNA "controlling elements" in maize (sweetcorn) in 1948, for which discovery she was awarded a Nobel Prize 1983. Shapiro and McClintock continued their collaboration up until her death in 1992.

He has also been a visiting professor from time to time, including once as a Darwin Prize Visiting Professor at the University of Edinburgh in 1994.

== Research ==
While working with Beckwith at Harvard, Shapiro was lead author of the first team to isolate a single gene from an organism. The gene they isolated was lacZ, which codes for the β-galactosidase enzyme used by E. coli bacteria to digest the sugars in milk. Their technique involved transduction to clone oppositely oriented copies of the gene inserted into two specialized transducing bacteriophages, then mixing single-stranded DNA from the two phages so that only the bacterial sequences would form a double helix, and finally using a nuclease to degrade the single-stranded phage sequences, leaving only the double-stranded lacZ DNA.

In a paper published in the Proceedings of the National Academy of Sciences in 1979, Shapiro was the first to propose replicative transposition as a detailed molecular mechanism for genetic mobility by transposable elements, such as the Tn3 ampicillin resistance transposon and transposing bacteriophage Mu. In this model, the ends of transposable elements covalently bond to target site DNA sequences via a process that forms an intermediate structure with replication forks at each end of the transposing element, sometimes called a "Shapiro intermediate".

In other research, Shapiro showed that bacteria organize themselves spatially as they grow in communities on agar surfaces. For instance, he analyzed how each strain of the sometimes pathogenic bacterium Proteus mirabilis forms its own pattern of complex terraced rings by periodic group “swarm" migration, an emergent property that can be explained by mathematical rules derived by a physicist collaborator, Sergei Esipov. Shapiro related this to other complex multicellular behaviors, such as hunting, building protective structures, spreading spores, and individual bacteria sacrificing themselves for the benefit of the larger community. Based on this work, Shapiro believes that cooperative behavior is a fundamental organizing concept for biological activity at all levels of complexity.

== Natural genetic engineering ==
He has proposed the term natural genetic engineering to account for how novelty is created in the course of biological evolution. It has been criticized by some, and Shapiro has responded to points raised by his critics.

Shapiro maintains that many genome changes that occur naturally operate by similar molecular DNA rearrangements to those applied intentionally by scientists using genetic engineering techniques developed over the last few decades. For example, transposable elements may be amplified and moved to different locations in the genome. These DNA changes have been found to result in distributed genomic networks for the execution of a wide range of complex traits in fungi, diatoms, plants and animals, such as flower development, the vertebrate body plan, viviparous reproduction and nervous system development in various mammals.

== The Third Way of Evolution ==
Shapiro and Denis Noble established The Third Way of Evolution (TWE) project in 2014. The TWE which is also known as the "Integrated Synthesis" shares many similarities with the extended evolutionary synthesis but is more extreme in its claims. The TWE consists of a group of researchers who provide a middle path "Third Way" alternative to creationism and the modern synthesis. The TWE predicts that the modern synthesis will be replaced with an entirely new evolutionary framework. As of 2023 only a very small minority of evolutionary biologists currently support the TWE and it has been described as a "fringe movement".

== Awards and honors ==
Shapiro was elected to Phi Beta Kappa in 1963 and was a Marshall Scholar from 1964 to 1966. He won the Darwin Prize Visiting Professorship of the University of Edinburgh in 1993. In 1994, he was elected as a fellow of the American Association for the Advancement of Science for "innovative and creative interpretations of bacterial genetics and growth, especially the action of mobile genetic elements and the formation of bacterial colonies." And in 2001, he was made an honorary officer of the Order of the British Empire for his service to the Marshall Scholarship program. In 2014 he was chosen to give the 3rd annual "Nobel Prize Laureate - Robert G. Edwards" lecture

== Selected publications ==
Shapiro edited the books Mobile Genetic Elements (Academic Press, 1983) and, with Martin Dworkin, Bacteria as Multicellular Organisms (Oxford University Press, 1997). He is the author of Evolution: A View from the 21st Century (FT Press Science, 2011, ISBN 978-0-13-278093-3).

In 2022 Shapiro published a greatly expanded and updated second edition of Evolution: A View from the 21st Century (Cognition Press, ISBN 978-1-7374987-0-4).

Shapiro, Denis Noble, Peter A. Corning, Addy Pross and Stuart A. Kauffman authored 2023's Evolution "On Purpose": Teleonomy in Living Systems.
