= Pro-war Left =

British political movement supportive of the Iraq War

The pro-war Left was a grouping of British left wing journalists and bloggers who supported for the 2003 invasion of Iraq, at variance with much of the rest of the British Left, which opposed it. They were centered on the Euston manifesto, which in October 2007 had 2,929 signatories. The name is derived from the pro-war group the Undertakers.

They have some similarity with American liberal hawks and Anti-Germans.

== Supporters ==
The pro-war Left can be seen as mainly a phenomenon of the blogosphere. Most of its supporters contribute to or run blogs, Harry's Place being the most well known and influential of these.

On October 7, 2007, a counter-demonstration to the Al-Quds march was organised by Harry's Place to which all of the pro-war Left were invited. The organisers estimate that 100 people turned up over the course of the day.

As well as the Euston Manifesto there are other organisations that have been associated with the pro-war Left such as Labour Friends of Iraq, Unite Against Terror, Democratiya and Engage.
