= American Jews in politics =

Politics of Jews in the United States

In United States politics, the trends of Jews have changed political positions multiple times. Many early American German-Jewish immigrants to the United States tended to be politically conservative, but the wave of Eastern European Jews, starting in the early 1880s, were generally more liberal or left-wing, and eventually became the political majority. Many of the latter moved to America having had experience in the socialist, anarchist, and communist movements as well as the Labor Bund emanating from Eastern Europe. Many Jews rose to leadership positions in the early 20th century American labor movement, and founded unions that played a major role in left-wing politics and, after 1936, inside the Democratic Party politics. For most of the 20th century since 1936, the vast majority of Jews in the United States have been aligned with the Democratic Party. During the 20th and 21st centuries, the Republican Party has launched initiatives to persuade American Jews to support their political policies, with relatively little success.

Over the past century, Jews in Europe and the Americas have traditionally tended towards the political left, and played key roles in the birth of the labor movement as well as socialism. While Diaspora Jews have also been represented in the conservative side of the political spectrum, even politically conservative Jews in Northern America and Western Europe have tended to support pluralism, or other positions associated with cosmopolitanism, more consistently than many other elements of the political right in those places.

The divide between right and left correlates to the various religious movements among American Jews. The more socially conservative movements in American Judaism (the Orthodox movement and various Haredi sects, though not the Conservative movement) tend to be politically conservative, while the more socially liberal movements (Conservative, Reform, and Reconstructionist) tend to be more politically liberal or left-leaning as well.

There are also a number of Jewish secular organizations at the local, national, and international levels. These organizations often play an important part in the Jewish community. Most of the largest groups, such as Hadassah and the United Jewish Communities, have an elected leadership. No one secular group represents the entire Jewish community, and there is often significant internal debate among Jews about the stances these organizations take on affairs dealing with the Jewish community as a whole, such as anti-Semitism and policies regarding Israel.

In the United States and Canada today, the mainly secular United Jewish Communities (UJC), formerly known as the United Jewish Appeal (UJA), represents over 150 Jewish Federations and 400 independent communities across North America. Every major American city has its local "Jewish Federation", and many have sophisticated community centers and provide services, mainly health care-related. They raise record sums of money for philanthropic and humanitarian causes in North America and Israel. Other organizations such as the Anti-Defamation League, American Jewish Congress, American Jewish Committee, American Israel Public Affairs Committee, Zionist Organization of America, Americans for a Safe Israel, B'nai B'rith, and Agudath Israel represent different segments of the American Jewish community on a variety of issues.

As of July 2025, Governor of Colorado Jared Polis, Governor of Pennsylvania Josh Shapiro, Governor of Delaware Matt Meyer, Governor of Illinois JB Pritzker, Governor of Hawaii Josh Green and Governor of North Carolina Josh Stein are Jewish.

== Progressive movement ==
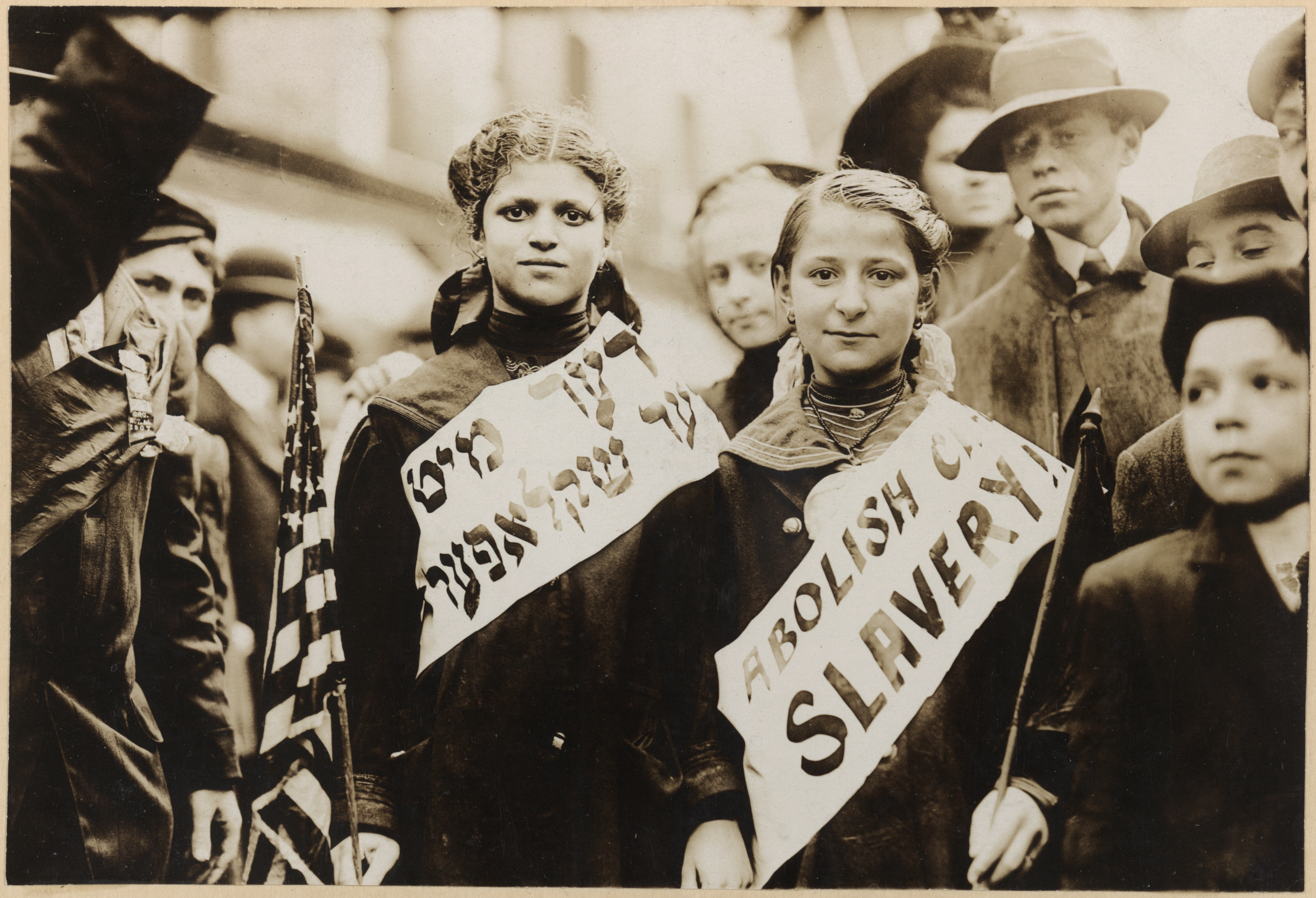
Two girls wearing banners with the slogan "ABOLISH CHILD SLAVERY!!" in English and Yiddish. Likely taken during the May 1, 1909 labor parade in New York City.

With the influx of Jews from Central and Eastern Europe many members of the Jewish community were attracted to labor and socialist movements and numerous Jewish newspapers such as Forwerts and Morgen Freiheit had a socialist or communist orientation. Left-wing organizations such as the Arbeter Ring and the Jewish People's Fraternal Order played an important part in Jewish community life until World War II.

Jewish Americans are involved in many important social movements, being in the forefront of promoting such issues as workers' rights, civil rights, women's rights, gay rights, religious pluralism, peace movements, and various other left-wing and progressive causes.

== Presidential elections ==
Jews as small-town businessmen were generally conservative Republicans in the late 19th century, but did not mobilize as a separate political faction. The new Yiddish-speaking arrivals in the early 20th century were much more radical and became highly mobilized in labor unions and parties. In 1920 38% of Jews voted Socialist, and 43% voted Republican. According to Beth Wenger, New Dealer Franklin Roosevelt, "cemented an unbreakable Jewish-Democratic bond.". In 1940 and 1944, 90% of Jews voted for Franklin D. Roosevelt, and 75% voted for Harry S. Truman in 1948. During the 1952 and 1956 elections, they voted 60% or more for Adlai Stevenson, while Dwight Eisenhower garnered 40% of their vote for his reelection; the best showing to date for the Republicans since Harding's 43% in 1920. In 1960, 83% voted for the Catholic Democrat John F. Kennedy. In 1964, 90% of American Jews voted for Lyndon Johnson against his Republican opponent Barry Goldwater, who was a Protestant with two Jewish grandparents. Hubert Humphrey garnered 81% of the Jewish vote in the 1968 election, in his losing bid for president against Richard Nixon.

During the Nixon re-election campaign of 1972, Jewish voters were relatively apprehensive about George McGovern, and only favored the Democrat by 65%, while Nixon more than doubled Jewish support for Republicans to 35%. In the election of 1976, Jewish voters supported the Democrat Jimmy Carter by 71% over the incumbent president Gerald Ford's 27%, but during the Carter re-election campaign of 1980, Jewish votes for the Democrat became relatively lower, with 45% support, with Republican election winner Ronald Reagan garnering 39%, and 14% going to the independent candidate John Anderson.

During the Reagan re-election campaign of 1984 he retained 31% of the Jewish vote, while 67% went to the Democrat Walter Mondale. The 1988 election saw Jewish voters favor the Democrat Michael Dukakis by 64%, while George H W Bush polled at 35%, though during his re-election in 1992 his Jewish support fell to 11%, with 80% voting for Bill Clinton and 9% going to the independent candidate Ross Perot. Clinton's re-election campaign in 1996 maintained high Jewish support at 78%, with 16% supporting Robert Dole and 3% for Perot.

The elections of 2000 and 2004 saw continued Jewish support for Democrats Al Gore and John Kerry remain in the high to mid-70% range. Kerry was Catholic, but had Jewish ancestry. In the 2000 presidential election, Joe Lieberman became the first Jewish American to run for national office on a major party ticket when he was chosen to be the vice-presidential nominee to the Democratic presidential candidate Al Gore. Republican George W Bush's re-election in 2004 saw Jewish support rise from 19% to 24%.

In the 2008 presidential election, 78% of Jews voted for the Democratic nominee Barack Obama, who became the first African-American to be elected president. Polls indicated that during this election, 83% of white Jews voted for Obama compared to 34% of white Protestants and 47% of white Catholics, though 67% of whites identifying with another religion and 71% identifying with no religion also voted for Obama. In the 2012 presidential election, 68% of Jews voted for Barack Obama's re-election.

In the 2016 election, 71% of Jews voted for the Democratic candidate Hillary Clinton over the eventual winner Donald Trump. In a 2018 poll, 71% of American Jews disapproved of Donald Trump's job as president, with only 26% approving—being the lowest approving religious group among those surveyed.

Of the 2016 and 2020 presidential candidates, many front runners were either married to Jews, had children who were married to Jews, or were Jewish themselves. Presidential candidates Bernie Sanders, Michael Bloomberg, and Marianne Williamson are Jewish. Michael Bennet's mother is Jewish. Beto O'Rourke and Kamala Harris are married to Jews. Donald Trump's daughter Ivanka converted to Judaism and married the Jewish real estate developer Jared Kushner. Both were active in Trump's administration. Bill and Hillary Clinton's daughter Chelsea Clinton married the Jewish investor Marc Mezvinsky, the son of U.S. Representative and felon Edward Mezvinsky. Lastly, all three of Joe Biden's children who lived into adulthood married Jews.

== United States Congress ==
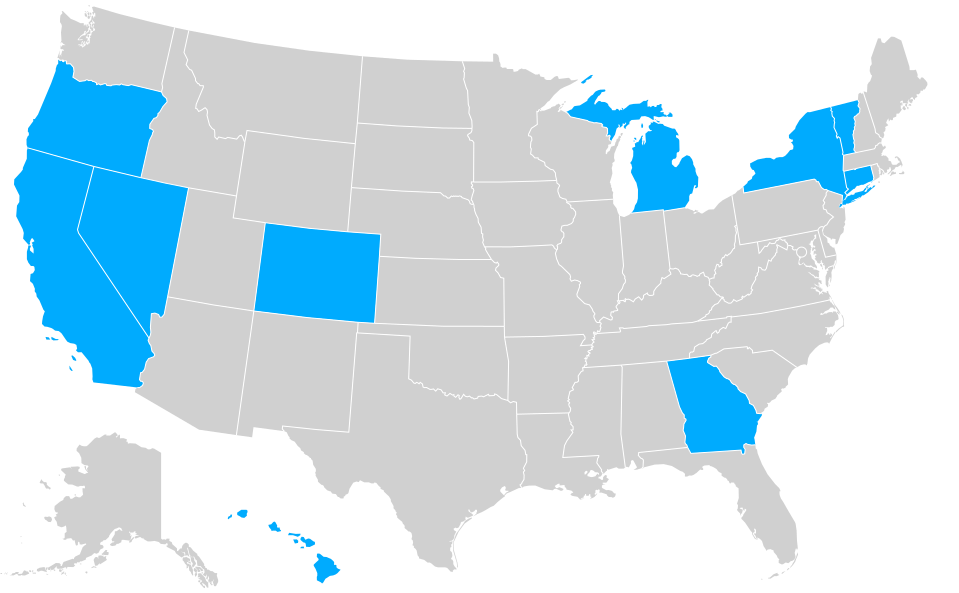
Map of current Jewish senators as of 2025. Blue means that there currently is one Jewish senator from that state. Gray means that there currently are no Jewish senators from that state.

For Congressional and Senate races, since 1968, American Jews have voted about 70–80% for Democrats; this support increased to 87% for Democratic House candidates during the 2006 elections. Currently, there are 9 Jews among the 100 U.S. Senators: 8 Democrats (Richard Blumenthal, Adam Schiff, Brian Schatz, Chuck Schumer, Ron Wyden, Jacky Rosen, Elissa Slotkin, and Jon Ossoff), and one of the Senate's two independents (Bernie Sanders, who caucuses with the Democrats as well).

As of January 2023, there are 33 Jews serving in the 118th Congress, a decrease of one from the 117th. They constitute 6% of that body's members, three times the 2% of Jews in the general American population.

== Civil rights ==
During the American Civil War, American Jews were divided on their views regarding slavery and abolition. Prior to 1861, there were virtually no rabbinical sermons on slavery. The silence on this issue was probably a result of fear that the controversy would create conflict within the Jewish community due to its relative popularity at the time, though some Jews did come to play a role in the ending of slavery. Some Jews owned slaves or traded them, and the livelihoods of many in the Jewish community of both the North and South were tied to the slave system. Most southern Jews supported slavery, and some, like Judah P. Benjamin, advocated its expansion. The abolitionist Ben Wade, who knew Benjamin in the U.S. Senate, described him as "an Israelite with Egyptian principles". Northern Jews sympathized with the South, and very few were abolitionists, seeking peace and remaining silent on the subject of slavery. America's largest Jewish community in New York was "overwhelmingly pro-southern, pro-slavery, and anti-Lincoln in the early years of the war". However, eventually, they began to lean politically toward "Father Abraham", his Republican party, and emancipation.

Since the beginning of the 20th century, many American Jews became very active in fighting societal prejudice and discrimination, and have historically been active participants in movements for civil rights, including active support of and participation in the Civil Rights Movement, active support of and participation in the labor rights movement, and active support of and participation in the women's rights movement.

Seymour Siegel suggests that the historic struggle against prejudice faced by Jews led to a natural sympathy for any people confronting discrimination. Joachim Prinz, president of the American Jewish Congress, stated the following when he spoke from the podium at the Lincoln Memorial during the famous March on Washington on August 28, 1963: "As Jews, we bring to this great demonstration, in which thousands of us proudly participate, a twofold experience - one of the spirit and one of our history ... From our Jewish historic experience of three and a half thousand years, we say: Our ancient history began with slavery and the yearning for freedom. During the Middle Ages, my people lived for a thousand years in the ghettos of Europe ... It is for these reasons that it is not merely sympathy and compassion for the black people of America that motivates us. It is, above all and beyond all such sympathies and emotions, a sense of complete identification and solidarity born of our own painful historic experience."

== International affairs ==
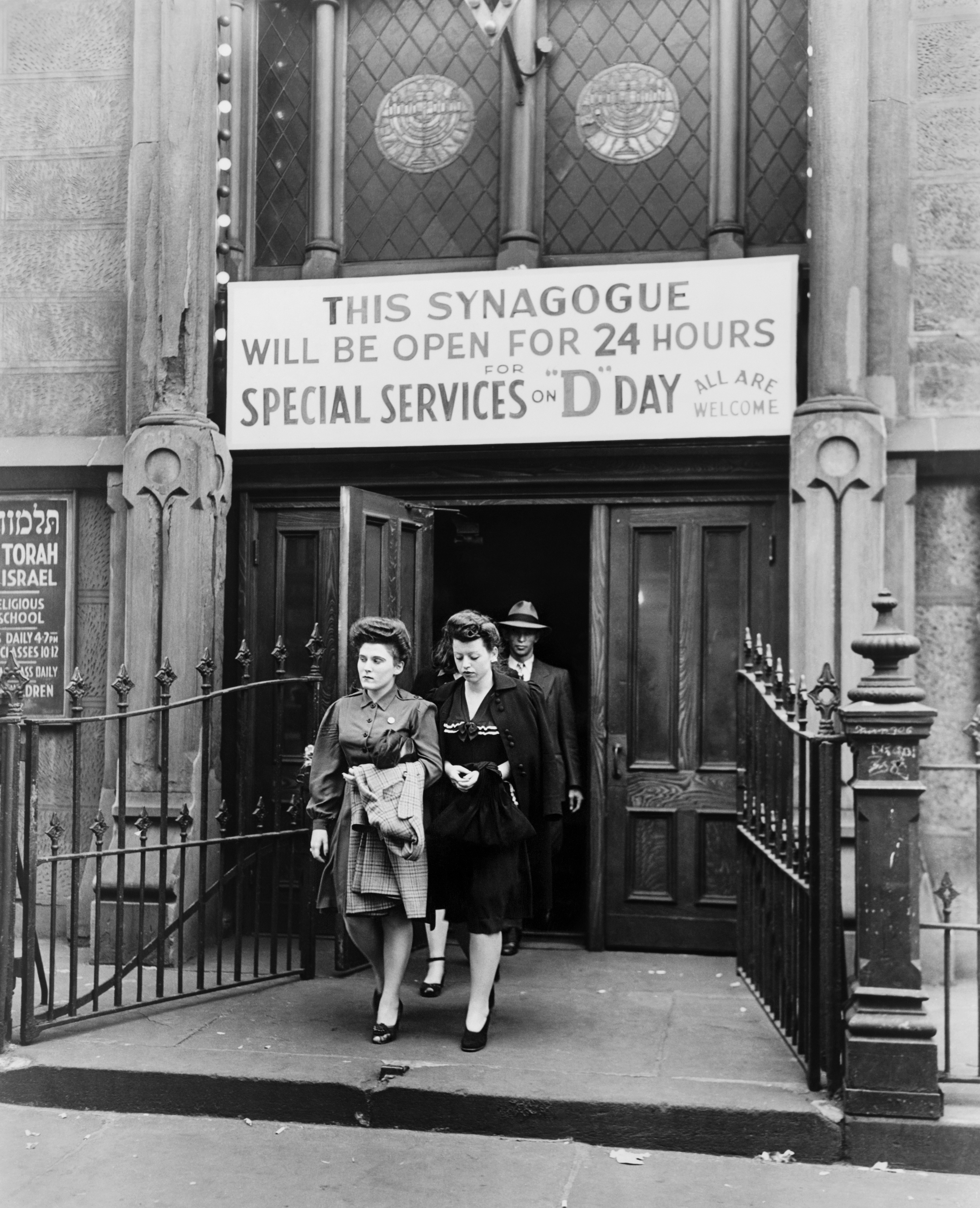
D-Day services at Congregation Emunath Israel on West 23rd Street New York City

American Jews (and Jews worldwide) began taking a special interest in international affairs in the early twentieth century, especially regarding their co-religionists persecution during pogroms in Imperial Russia, and later, regarding increasing restrictions on immigration in the 1920s. This period was also synchronous with the development of political Zionism, as well as the Balfour Declaration, which gave Zionism its first official recognition.

During the 1930s, large-scale boycotts of German merchandise were organized; this period was synchronous with the rise of Fascism in Europe. Franklin D. Roosevelt's leftist domestic policies received strong Jewish support in the 1930s and 1940s, as did his foreign policies and the subsequent founding of the United Nations. Support for political Zionism in this period, although growing in influence, remained a distinctly minority opinion. The founding of Israel in 1948 made the Middle East a center of attention; the immediate recognition of Israel by the American government was an indication of both its intrinsic support and the influence of political Zionism.

This attention initially was based on a natural and religious affinity toward, and support for, Israel and world Jewry. For example, American Jews strongly campaigned for the rights of Soviet Jews to immigrate to Israel and the United States during the Soviet Jewry movement in the 1970s. The attention is also because of the ensuing and unresolved conflicts regarding the founding Israel and Zionism itself. A lively internal debate commenced, following the Six-Day War. The American Jewish community was divided over whether or not they agreed with the Israeli response; the great majority came to accept the war as necessary. A tension existed especially for leftist Jews, between their liberal ideology and (rightist) Zionist backing in the midst of this conflict. This deliberation about the Six-Day War showed the depth and complexity of Jewish responses to the varied events of the 1960s. Similar tensions were aroused by the 1977 election of Menachem Begin and the rise of revisionist policies, the 1982 Lebanon War, and the continuing occupation of the West Bank and Gaza. Disagreement over Israel's 1993 acceptance of the Oslo Accords caused a further split among American Jews; This mirrored a similar split among Israelis, and led to a parallel rift within the pro-Israel lobby.

Because of the emotional connection many Jews have for Israel, the issue has generated strong passions among both left-wing and right-wing Jews. There is a significant Jewish presence in the disparate political movement known as the "liberal hawks" or the pro-war Left, which, while strongly committed to liberal or leftist social domestic policy, also supports a liberal interventionist, hawkish or right-wing pro-Israel foreign policy for the United States. (Examples include Joe Lieberman, Christopher Hitchens, many of the contributors to Dissent magazine, and many of the signatories of the Euston Manifesto.) There is also a significant Jewish presence in the disparate political movement known as the "neoconservatives", which advocates for a more hawkish approach towards anti-Zionist regimes in the Middle East, one of which culminated in the invasion of Iraq in 2003. At the same time, there is a significant Jewish presence in the pro-Palestinian movement, including Norman Finkelstein, Noam Chomsky, and Judith Butler.

The "Israel lobby" is the diverse coalition of groups and individuals seeking to influence the foreign policy of the United States in support of Zionism, Israel or the specific policies of its elected government. These organizations have included political, secular, and religious groups of Jewish-Americans, as well as non-Jewish organizations of political, secular, and religious Christian Americans. These groups have reportedly increased in size and influence over the years. The term itself has been subject to debate and criticism over the years, concerning its clarity and exact definition.

Although Jews are divided in their opinion of Trump's handling of the Israel–Palestine conflict and Netanyahu's domestic policies, polling data indicates that the vast majority of American Jews continue to support unconditional U.S. financial and military aid to Israel, which is a fixture of the platforms of both major parties, while various polling data indicate that most Americans would prefer to decrease or even halt military aid to Israel.

== Contemporary politics ==
According to a 2017 survey, fifty-four percent of Orthodox Jews say they voted for Trump, according to a new survey by the American Jewish Committee, or AJC. That was well above 24 percent of Conservative Jews, 10 percent of Reform Jews, 8 percent of Reconstructionist Jews and 14 percent of respondents who identify themselves as “just Jewish.”

"Jews have devoted themselves to politics with almost religious fervor", writes Mitchell Bard, who adds that Jews have the highest percentage voter turnout of any ethnic group. While 2–2.5% of the United States population is Jewish, 94% live in 13 key electoral college states, which combined have enough electors to elect the president. Though the majority (60–70%) of the country's Jews identify as Democratic, Jews span the political spectrum, and Helmreich describes them as "a uniquely swayable bloc" as a result of Republican stances on Israel. A paper by Dr. Eric Uslaner of the University of Maryland disagrees, at least with regard to the 2004 election: "Only 15% of Jews said that Israel was a key voting issue. Among those voters, 55% voted for Kerry (compared to 83% of Jewish voters not concerned with Israel)." The paper goes on to point out that negative views of Evangelical Christians had a distinctly negative impact for Republicans among Jewish voters, while Orthodox Jews, traditionally more conservative in outlook as to social issues, favored the Republican Party. A New York Times article suggests that this movement of Jewish voters to the Republican party is focused heavily on faith-based issues, similar to the Catholic vote, which is credited for helping President Bush taking Florida in 2004.

Owing to high Democratic identification in the 2008 United States presidential election, 78% of Jews voted for Democrat Barack Obama, versus 21% for Republican John McCain, despite Republican attempts to connect Obama to Muslim and pro-Palestinian causes. It has been suggested that running mate Sarah Palin's outspoken conservative views on social issues may have nudged Jews away from the McCain-Palin ticket. Obama's chief strategist, David Axelrod, is Jewish, as is his former Chief of Staff, Rahm Emanuel.

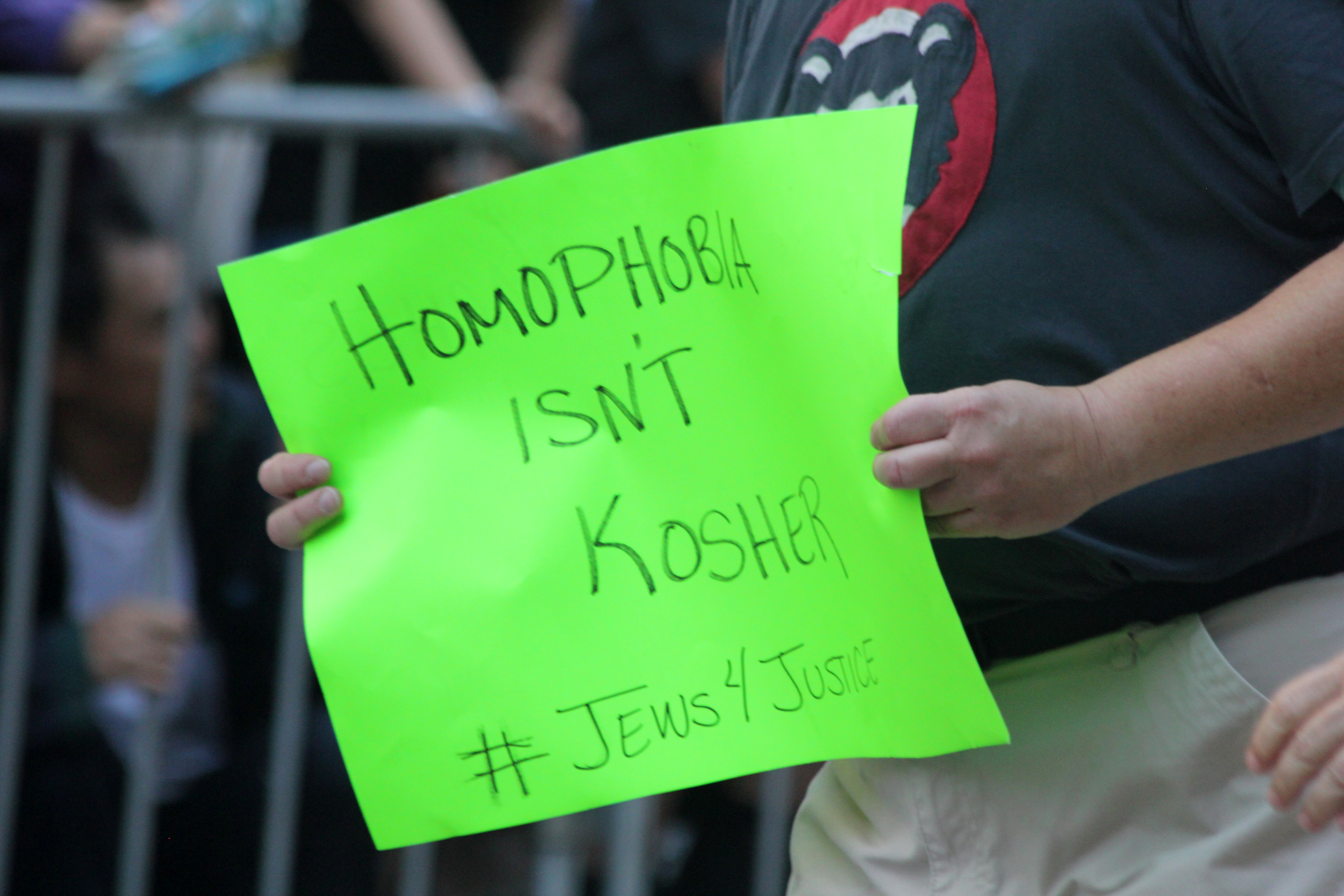
Homophobia isn't kosher, San Francisco Pride 2013

American Jews are largely supportive of LGBTQ+ rights, though a split exists within the group by observance. Reform and Reconstructionist Jews are far more supportive on issues like gay marriage than Orthodox Jews are. A 2007 survey of Conservative Jewish leaders and activists showed that an overwhelming majority now supports gay rabbinical ordination and same-sex marriage. Accordingly, 78% percent of Jewish voters rejected Proposition 8, the bill which banned gay marriage in California. No other ethnic or religious group voted as strongly against it.

Jews in America also overwhelmingly oppose current United States marijuana criminalization policy. 86% of Jewish Americans opposed arresting non-violent marijuana smokers, compared to 61% for the population at large and 68% of all Democrats. Additionally, 85% of Jews in the United States opposed using federal law enforcement to close patient cooperatives for medical marijuana in states where medical marijuana is legal, compared to 67% of the population at large and 73% of Democrats.

Jewish support for President Barack Obama fell 9 points from 78% in 2008 to 69% in 2012. Obama's opponent in 2008, John McCain, received the support of 21% of Jewish voters, whereas Mitt Romney increased that share by 9 points to 30% in 2012.

In the 2018 midterms, Jews were again the most Democratic group as designated by religious identity, with 79% voting for the Democrats while 17% voted for the Republicans.

Jewish vote to the Democratic Party in Presidential elections since 1916
Election year	Candidate of the Democratic Party	% of Jewish vote to the Democratic Party	Result of the Democratic Party
1916	Woodrow Wilson	55	Won
1920	James M. Cox	19	Lost
1924	John W. Davis	51	Lost
1928	Al Smith	72	Lost
1932	Franklin D. Roosevelt	82	Won
1936	Franklin D. Roosevelt	85	Won
1940	Franklin D. Roosevelt	90	Won
1944	Franklin D. Roosevelt	90	Won
1948	Harry Truman	75	Won
1952	Adlai Stevenson	64	Lost
1956	Adlai Stevenson	60	Lost
1960	John F. Kennedy	82	Won
1964	Lyndon B. Johnson	90	Won
1968	Hubert Humphrey	81	Lost
1972	George McGovern	65	Lost
1976	Jimmy Carter	71	Won
1980	Jimmy Carter	45	Lost
1984	Walter Mondale	67	Lost
1988	Michael Dukakis	64	Lost
1992	Bill Clinton	80	Won
1996	Bill Clinton	78	Won
2000	Al Gore	79	Lost
2004	John Kerry	76	Lost
2008	Barack Obama	78	Won
2012	Barack Obama	69	Won
2016	Hillary Clinton	71	Lost
2020	Joe Biden	69	Won
2024	Kamala Harris	63	Lost

Jewish vote to the Republican Party in Presidential elections since 1916
Election year	Candidate of the Republican Party	% of Jewish vote to the Republican Party	Result of the Republican Party
1916	Charles E. Hughes	45	Lost
1920	Warren G. Harding	43	Won
1924	Calvin Coolidge	27	Won
1928	Herbert Hoover	28	Won
1932	Herbert Hoover	18	Lost
1936	Alf Landon	15	Lost
1940	Wendell Willkie	10	Lost
1944	Thomas Dewey	10	Lost
1948	Thomas Dewey	10	Lost
1952	Dwight D. Eisenhower	36	Won
1956	Dwight D. Eisenhower	40	Won
1960	Richard Nixon	18	Lost
1964	Barry Goldwater	10	Lost
1968	Richard Nixon	17	Won
1972	Richard Nixon	35	Won
1976	Gerald Ford	27	Lost
1980	Ronald Reagan	39	Won
1984	Ronald Reagan	31	Won
1988	George H. W. Bush	35	Won
1992	George H. W. Bush	11	Lost
1996	Bob Dole	16	Lost
2000	George W. Bush	19	Won
2004	George W. Bush	24	Won
2008	John McCain	22	Lost
2012	Mitt Romney	30	Lost
2016	Donald Trump	24	Won
2020	Donald Trump	30	Lost
2024	Donald Trump	35	Won

== See also ==
- Jewish political movements
- Judaism and politics
- List of Jewish political milestones in the United States
- Jewish conservatism
- Israel lobby in the United States
- List of Jewish members of the United States Congress
- Orthodox Jewish bloc voting
- Catholic Church and politics in the United States
- Ethnocultural politics in the United States
- Latino vote
