= Alan Johnson (political theorist) =

British political theorist and activist

Alan Johnson is a British political theorist and activist. He is a senior research fellow at the Britain Israel Communications and Research Centre. Previously he was Professor of Democratic Theory and Practice at Edge Hill University.

== Early life ==
Johnson was born in North Shields and developed as a socialist in 1979 as a volunteer at the Marxist bookshop Days of Hope in Newcastle upon Tyne. In 1984, Johnson helped found the Merseyside Museum of Labour History (later the Museum of Liverpool Life).

== Career ==
From 1991 to 2011 Johnson was an academic at Edge Hill University in the Social Sciences. He became a reader in 2001 and professor of democratic theory and practice in 2007.

Between 2008 and 2010 Johnson worked at the UK Home Office on 'communication strategies to counter radicalisation'.

In 2011 Johnson left Edge Hill University and became a senior research fellow at the Britain Israel Communications and Research Centre (BICOM). Johnson is editor of BICOM's Fathom magazine.

== Political positions ==
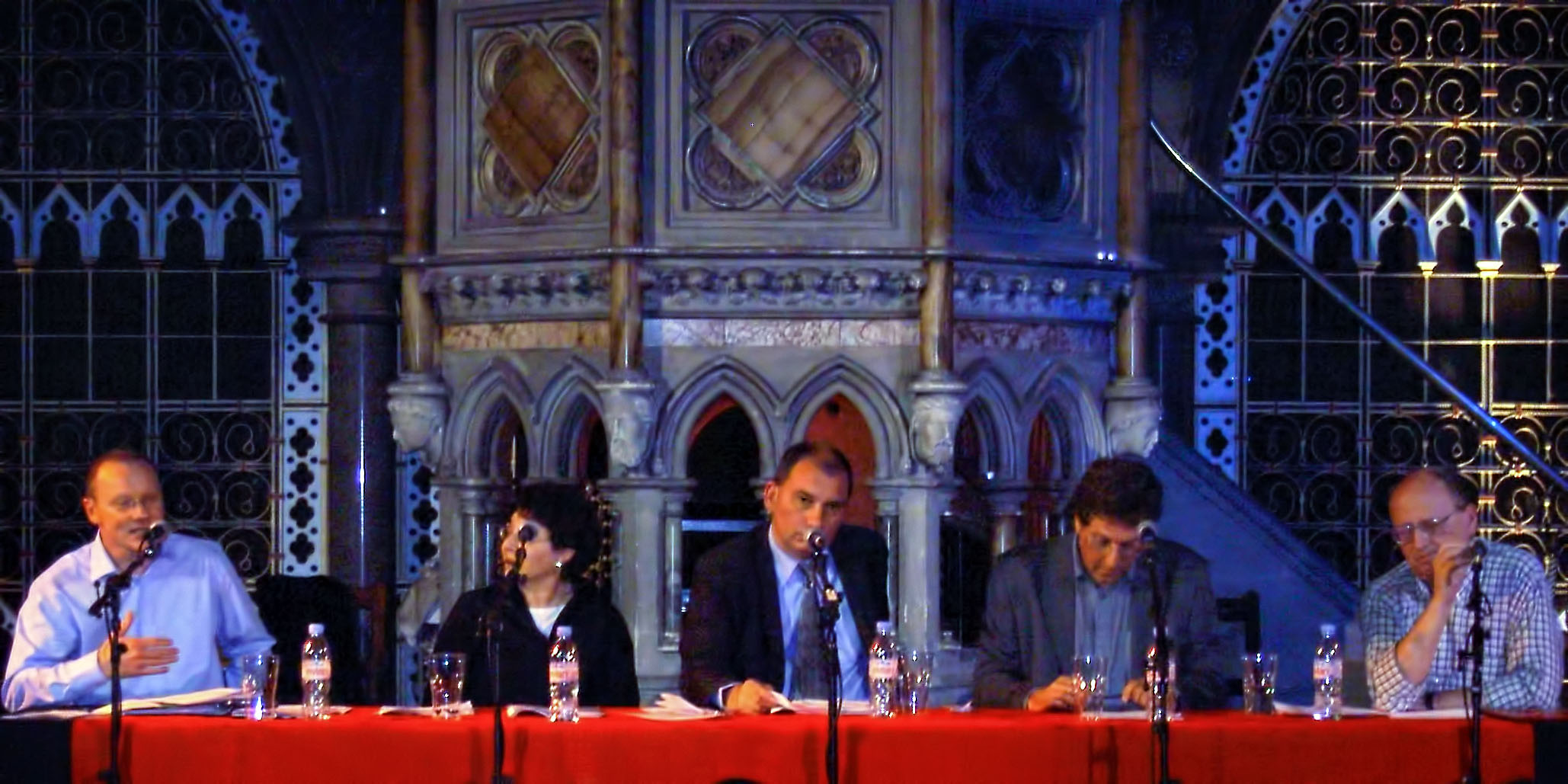
The panel at the public launch of the Euston Manifesto. From left to right: Alan Johnson, Eve Garrard, Nick Cohen, Shalom Lappin, and Norman Geras.

Johnson was an editor of the journals Democratiya (2005–2009) and Engage Journal, the former of which he also helped found. He is a scholar of the labour movement in Iraq, and is a founding member of Labour Friends of Iraq.

A former Trotskyist and long-term member of the Socialist Organiser Alliance, researching Hal Draper, Johnson is a co-author of the Euston Manifesto. He was opposed to the 2003 invasion of Iraq. Since 2003 he has worked with Abdullah Muhsin of the Iraqi Workers Federation. Critical of the blanket labelling of advocates of military intervention against dictatorial regimes as neoconservatives in foreign policy, he calls for a "proper consideration of the social democratic antitotalitarianism of Paul Berman, Václav Havel, Adam Michnik, Ladan Boroumand, Kanan Makiya, Azar Nafisi, Bernard Kouchner, Tony Blair, or Gordon Brown" and points out that "neo-conservatives" in the Democratic Party deserve "their share of the credit" for "undermining cynical and self-defeating 'realism' and embracing democracy-promotion."

He is 'a long time socialist and a supporter of Palestinian statehood' and is an activist for the two states for two peoples solution to the Israeli-Palestinian Conflict.

The Dissent editor and American political philosopher Michael Walzer argued Johnson's Democratiya was similar to Dissent in politics and style. "Two commitments give shape to the Democratiya project. The first is to defend and promote a left politics that is liberal, democratic, egalitarian, and internationalist. Those four adjectives should routinely characterize left politics, but we all know that they don't. The second commitment is to defend and promote a form of political argument that is nuanced, probing, and concrete, principled but open to disagreement: no slogans, no jargon, no unexamined assumptions, no party line. This argumentative style ... is also a moral style".

In his A Foreign Policy for the Left, Michael Walzer wrote of Johnson's influence. "I have also learned a great deal from two very different sets of friends in Great Britain, the authors of the Euston and Kilburn Manifestoes. Norman Geras, Alan Johnson, Shalom Lapin and Nick Cohen are the Eustonites. Michel Rustin and Stuart Hall are the Kilburnites".

Johnson has criticised the political theory of Slavoj Žižek as authoritarian and "left-fascist" over several essays. Žižek responded angrily in his 2013 lecture in London and in the New Statesman, calling Johnson "that jerk who pronounced me a leftist fascist", adding "I think we should take over these – all of these – authoritarian gestures, unity, leader, sacrifice, f*ck it! Why not?"

== Books ==
- 2001: Leadership and social movements, Manchester University Press, 2001, co-authored with Colin Barker and Michael Lavalette. ISBN 978-0-7190-5902-5
- 2003: Marxism and the American Worker (editor) a special issue of Historical Materialism: Critical Research in Marxist Theory, Vol 11. Issue 4. ISBN 9004-13606-1
- 2006: Hadi Never Died: Hadi Saleh and the Iraqi Trade Unions, TUC Publications, co-authored with Abdullah Muhsin. ISBN 1-85006-761-9
- 2007: Global Politics After 9/11: The Democratiya Interviews, Foreign Policy Centre, 2007, Editor. ISBN 1-905833-11-3
- 2013: The New Histadrut: Peace, Social Justice and the Israeli Trade Unions, TUFI, London.
- 2019: Institutionally Antisemitic: Contemporary Left Antisemitism and the Crisis in the British Labour Party, Fathom Publications. ISBN 978-1-9160803-0-0
- 2023: Mapping the New Left Antisemitism: The Fathom Essays (editor). ISBN 978-1032344713
