= Latino vote =

Voting trends during elections in the United States

The Latino vote refers to the voting trends during elections in the United States by eligible voters of Latino background. The media often use this phrase to label voters of this ethnicity, to suggest that this demographic group could potentially tilt an election's outcome, and to discuss how candidates have developed messaging strategies for this group.

== Voting demographics ==
According to the Pew Research Center, Hispanic citizens comprised 16% of the U.S. eligible electorate in 2026, or an estimated 38.95 million eligible voters. This resulted in an increase of an estimated 5.25 million since 2022. In 2024, Hispanic citizens made up 43.3% of eligible voters in New Mexico, 33.0% in California, 32.3% in Texas, and 25.4% in Arizona. Eligible voters include those who meet the requirements to vote, whether or not they register or cast a ballot.

== Low voting turnout ==
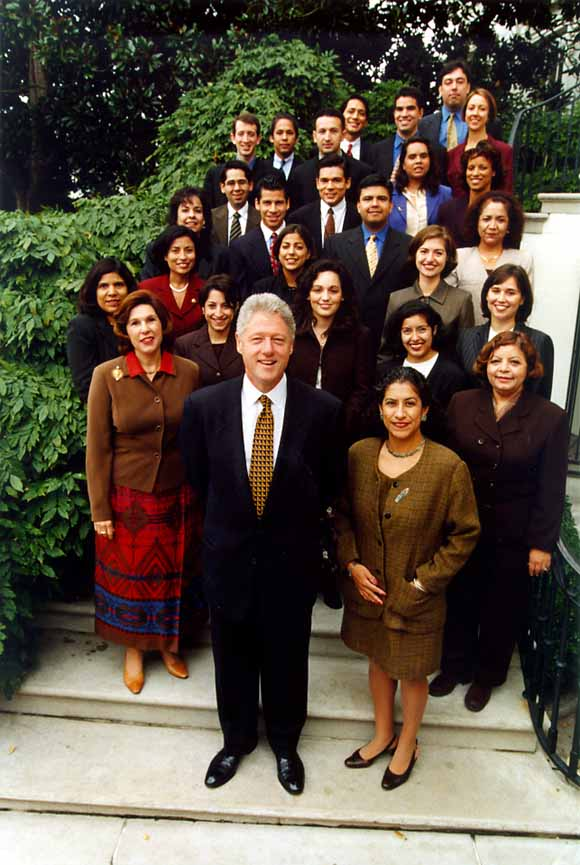
President Bill Clinton and his Latino appointees in 1998

In 2006, the percentage of Latinos who participated in political activities varied but rarely exceeded half of all eligible Latinos. In general, Latinos participate in common civic activities, such as voting, at much lower rates than nearby non-Latino whites or blacks. About 57.9 percent of U.S. citizen adult Latinos were registered to vote in the 2004 election, and 47.2 percent turned out to vote. The voter registration and turnout rates are approximately 10 percent lower than those of non-Latino blacks and 18 percent lower than those of non-Latino whites.

To explain low voter turnout among Latinos, researchers have analyzed voter participation demographics throughout many years. According to a 2002 study, researchers have found many explanations as to why Latinos have a low voter turnout. Some explanations include physical barriers, such as a lack of transportation, and systemic barriers, such as harassment, discrimination, insufficient polling booths, inconvenient locations, and biased enforcement of election laws that may limit Latino access to registering and voting.

One of the biggest explanations for low Latino voter turnout is associated with accurately measuring the Latino vote based on a general population that includes many non-citizens. The number of adult non-U.S. citizens rose from 1.9 million in 1976 to more than 8.4 million in 2000, a 350 percent increase. Thus, the share of Latino nonparticipants is overwhelmingly non-U.S. citizens.

Another explanation for low levels of Latino voter turnout stems from the relatively young age of the Latino population. For example, 40 percent of the California Latino population was under eighteen years of age in 1985.

Lower-income individuals vote at lower rates than higher-income individuals. In terms of income, the general argument is that individuals with higher socioeconomic status have the civic skills, participatory attitudes, and time and money to participate. Education also positively relates to participation and vote choice, as Latinos with a college degree or postgraduate training are more likely to vote. More than 30 percent of Latino adult citizens have less than a high school education, while 12 percent of non-Latino white adult citizens have less than a high school education. Therefore, low participation may result from limited knowledge of the political process that formal education should provide.

This varies by country of origin. A 2003 study found that female Mexican-Americans and higher-income individuals were more likely to register and, in turn, vote. The same study concluded that education and marital status posed the primary barriers to Puerto Rican voter registration. These patterns appear across many Latino communities in the United States. Additionally, studies show that Latino/a candidates on the ballot tend to increase voter turnout in these communities. This is in part due to the strong association between cultural identification and partisanship. The growing presence of Latino/a voters in politics reflects the group's increasing presence across the United States, where they make up over 30% of the population in swing or politically significant states such as Texas, Arizona, and California. Large migrating populations, such as the increase in Cuban-Americans in Florida, also have a strong impact for similar reasons. Community identification proves a strong factor in voter registration, particularly among working Latinas. Puerto Ricans in Southern states have similar turnout rates, presumably for similar reasons; that said, turnout varies widely across states, in part because of the factors above.

Among other minority communities in the U.S., turnout seems to increase when a member of their race is on the ballot. Black voter turnout rose significantly with Obama's two presidential campaigns and then fell back again in 2016.

Although turnout for Latinos is low, it has been noted that Latinos residing in communities with a large Latino population are more likely to turn out to vote.

== Latino vote influences ==
Much literature analyzes what influences Latino voting choices. One strong determinant is religion, which is believed to play a role in defining the political attitudes and behaviors of Latino voters. Latinos have long been associated with Catholicism with respect to faith and religious identity and with the Democratic Party regarding political allegiance and identity. Although most Latinos affiliate themselves with the Democratic Party, the Latino National Political Survey has found a consistent finding that Latinos identify themselves ideologically as moderates and conservatives. Social conservatism usually originates from religion, which oftentimes predicts Latinos' opposition to abortion, same-sex marriage, support for the death penalty, and support for traditional gender roles. Religion's ideological role in politics is undeniable in both parties. While shared collective identity is often associated with a particular religion, political beliefs often reflect community values rather than religion alone. Notably, in 2006 and 2008, the Democratic Party led in Latino/a voter turnout and results. During these election cycles, and still, to a degree, today, the Democratic Party appeals on issues such as immigration and healthcare. At the same time, the Republican Party tends to focus on social issues and religion-based appeals.

Although many media outlets sometimes portray the Latina vote as a product of social movements, some social science scholars argue that it is a movement in and of itself, born of historical left-wing advocacy. For example, LLEGÓ, the National Latina/o Lesbian, Gay, Bisexual, and Transgender Organization (1987–present), remains a leader in Latina activism in the United States. Organizations such as LLEGÓ have shaped members' political ideologies and, over the years, have greatly influenced political participation in these often-overlooked communities. Given the importance of ethnic and religious identity, these organizations cultivate collective political pride. As a result, voting turnout often increases among past and current members of LLEGÓ and other groups.

Researchers have also studied political ads to determine how they influence Latino voting behavior. In a study by Abrajano, researchers concluded that different political ads influence Latino voting choices depending on how assimilated individuals are to American life. For Spanish-dominated Latinos, political ads that tapped into ethnic identity seemed most influential. By contrast, for assimilated Latinos, ethnic appeals had some influence, but exposure to more informative policy ads in English or Spanish had a greater impact on their voting decisions. During political movements in the 1960s and 1970s, such as the women's liberation movement and the Chicano movement, Latina women began to unite around ideals similar to those embraced by feminist voter organizations, including the Third World Women's Alliance and other Bay Area activist groups. According to a study using the November 2000 CPS, education appeared to have the greatest influence on Latina voter registration and choice, more than income, employment, or homeowner status. However, this study was conducted across the United States. With that in mind, it is important to reconcile these overarching themes with community-specific issues. For example, considering the growing Latino/a populations in Florida from Puerto Rico, factors of registration and choice will differ greatly between these groups and Latinos/as in other parts of the state.

=== The Cuban experience and voting pattern ===
After the Marxist-Leninist socialist Fidel Castro overthrew the Cuban military leader Fulgencio Batista, he made significant changes throughout the island. These changes included nationalizing private property, businesses, and land without compensation.

While Castro made improvements in healthcare, literacy rates, education, and public services in rural areas, he also repressed civil and political rights by shutting down the free press, jailing free thinkers and protesters, and imposing a one-party state.

From 1959 to 1962, there was a large-scale exodus of Cuban people, known as the "golden exile." This first wave of migration primarily consisted of middle- and upper-middle-class, well-educated white-collar workers whose belongings were seized. These experiences have had a lasting socio-psychological impact on Cuban immigrants, instilling a deep fear of socialism that is passed down to future generations. Therefore, when Republicans highlight anti-socialist messaging, it resonates with this group of people.

== Policies ==
Data from both the 2002 and 1999 National Surveys on Latinos revealed that over 60% of Latinos favor a larger government with more government programs, even if this means higher taxes. A 1992 study found that Latinos are more likely to support government programs focused on crime control and drug prevention, child care services, environmental protection, science and technology, defense, and programs for refugees and immigrants.

In an October 2010 Pew Hispanic Center report, Hispanics ranked education, jobs, and health care as their top three issues of concern, while immigration ranked as the fourth most important issue.

In 2020, the economy, health care, and the COVID-19 pandemic were reported to be the top three most important issues for Hispanic voters.

In 2024, a Pew Research Center survey found that 85% of Latino registered voters considered the economy very important in the presidential election. Healthcare followed at 71%, while violent crime and gun policy each came in at 62%, followed by immigration at 59%. The survey also revealed differences in issue priorities between Latino supporters of the two major presidential candidates. For instance, 71% of Latino supporters of Donald Trump considered immigration a very important issue, compared with 51% of Latino supporters of Kamala Harris.

=== Economy ===
According to the National Exit Poll, 60% of Latino voters identified the economy as the country's most important issue in 2012. In 2022, economic issues remain the primary concern for Hispanic voters. In a Wall Street Journal poll, Hispanic men stated that Republicans possessed better economic policy, by a margin of 17 points, while Hispanic women stated that Democrats had better economic policy, by a 10-point margin.

=== Gun control ===
According to a 2022 Pew Research Center poll, 54% of Hispanic Republicans and conservative-leaning independents find it more important to protect gun ownership rights than to control gun ownership. In comparison, 83% of non-Hispanic Republicans hold the same belief.

=== Gender-neutral terminology ===
The use of the gender-neutral term "Latinx" is highly unpopular among Hispanic and Latino voters, with over 90% disliking the term. The term has been used by prominent Democratic politicians such as Joe Biden, Elizabeth Warren, and Alexandria Ocasio-Cortez; who have been widely mocked by many Republicans, Hispanics, and Latinos for its use.

A 2021 poll found that 30% of Hispanic voters are less likely to vote for a politician who uses the term "Latinx". 68% of Hispanic voters prefer the term "Hispanic", while 21% of voters prefer the term "Latino". By comparison, only 2% of Hispanic voters embrace the term "Latinx". Furthermore, 40% of American Hispanics state that the term "Latinx" bothers or offends them.

=== Immigration ===
In the United States, the Latino vote is often associated with immigration issues such as immigration reform, immigration enforcement, and amnesty for undocumented immigrants. However, immigration could be no more important than unemployment or the economy for many Latino American citizens. Hispanic voters who are immigrants or the children of immigrants are more likely to vote for the Democratic Party, while Hispanic voters whose ancestors have lived in the United States for multiple generations are more likely to be split or vote for the Republican Party.

=== Education ===
Education is also a constant preoccupation among Latino voters. Latinos emphasize education, citing issues such as expanding the number of schools, reducing class sizes, and increasing cultural sensitivity in teachers and curricula. Other educational concerns Latinos expressed include ensuring children can advance to the next educational level. Other concerns among Latinos included the economy and education, health care (18%), the federal budget deficit (11%), and foreign policy (6%).

== Elections ==
Hispanic voters in Presidential elections
Presidential Elections	Republican	Democrat	Ref.
1976	24%	74%	
1980	37%	56%	
1984	34%	66%	
1988	30%	69%	
1992	25%	61%	
1996	21%	72%	
2000	35%	62%	
2004	44%	54%	
2008	31%	67%	
2012	27%	71%	
2016	29%	65%	
2020	33%	65%	
2024	46%	52%	

== 2004-2018 ==
In 2004, according to research by the Thomás Rivera Policy Institute, 58% of Hispanic and Latino voters self-identified as Democrats, while 22% identified as Republicans and 19% as Independents.

In 2006, 69% of Latino voters supported Democratic candidates in congressional races, while 30% supported Republican candidates.

In 2008, 67% of Latinos voted for then-Democratic presidential nominee Barack Obama, while 31% of Hispanics voted for then-Republican presidential nominee John McCain.

During the 2010 midterm elections, 31% of eligible Hispanic and Latino voters turned out to vote. 60% of Latinos supported Democratic candidates, while 38% of Latinos supported Republican candidates.

A 2012 study by the Center for Immigration Studies projected that, in November 2012, Hispanics and Latinos would comprise 17.2% of the total U.S. population, 15% of adults, 11.2% of adult citizens, and 8.9% of voters. By comparison, the report found that, in 2012, non-Hispanic whites were expected to be 73.4% of the national vote and non-Hispanic blacks were expected to be 12.2%. The report noted that, by weight, "eight percentage points of the Hispanic vote nationally equals slightly less than one percentage point of the non-Hispanic white vote". The study also compared the 8.9% Latino share of voters to veterans (12% of the electorate), those with family incomes above $100,000 (18%), seniors 65 and older (19%), married persons (60%), and those who live in owner-occupied housing (80%).

In terms of voter turnout, the Center for Studies projected that 52.7% (±0.6) of eligible Latinos would vote in the 2012 election, an increase from 49.9% in 2008 and a continuation of the past decade's long upward trend. The projected Latino voter participation rate was 52.7%, compared to 66.1% for non-Hispanic whites and 65.2% for non-Hispanic blacks in 2008.

In 2012, 70% of Hispanic and Latino voters identified with, or leaned toward, the Democratic Party, while 20% of Hispanic voters identified with, or leaned toward, the Republican Party.

In 2014, out of the 25 million eligible Hispanic voters, 27%, or 6.8 million, cast ballots.

During the 2016 presidential election, Republican presidential nominee Donald Trump was supported by 57% of Cuban-American voters in Florida, while Democratic presidential nominee Hillary Clinton received 40% of such vote.

A record 29 million Hispanics and Latinos were eligible to vote in the 2018 midterm elections, accounting for 12.8% of all eligible voters, a new high. They made up an estimated 11% of all voters nationwide on Election Day, nearly matching their share of the U.S. eligible voter population (U.S. citizens ages 18 and older).

In those elections, three out of four Hispanic and Latino voters supported a Democratic candidate. However, the Democratic Party had by 2018 lost ground among their voting population since its high-water mark in 2012.

Republicans are often supported by Cuban-American and Venezuelan-American voters, as well as among Latino voters in Florida and Texas.

In 2018, 29.1 million Hispanics and Latinos were eligible to vote. 62% of Hispanic and Latino voters identified with, or leaned toward, the Democratic Party, whereas 27% of Hispanic voters identified with, or leaned toward, the Republican Party. Hispanic voters who primarily spoke English were more likely to support Republican candidates (33%), compared to voters who only spoke Spanish (15%). In Florida, 66% of Cuban Americans supported Republican gubernatorial nominee Ron DeSantis, while only 33% supported Democratic gubernatorial nominee Andrew Gillum, a 2 to 1 ratio for Republicans.

According to a 2019 Gallup Poll, 29% of Hispanics and Latinos identified as conservative, and that same number, 29%, voted for Donald Trump in the 2016 Presidential Election.

== 2020 election ==
Latino voters were crucial to President Joe Biden's electoral victory in the 2020 presidential election. He won 61% of the Latino vote, and Donald Trump won 36%, according to the Pew Research Center's analysis of validated voters. In the swing states of Arizona and Nevada, Latino voters made the difference for Joe Biden. Many Latino voters in Nevada are members of the Culinary Union Local 226 and supported Biden based on right-to-work standards.

In heavily urbanized northeastern states and California, Biden secured overwhelming majorities among Latino voters, as Democratic presidential candidates have long done.

However, Latino voters proved that they were not monolithic. In Florida, Trump earned strong Latino support among Cuban and South American communities in Miami-Dade County and 46% of the statewide Latino vote, much higher than his 35% in 2016. Trump's campaign anti-socialist messaging drove the shift. Still, in every county outside Miami-Dade County, Latinos voted for Biden by a 2-to-1 margin. Ultimately, Biden won the majority of Florida's Latino electorate.

Additionally, in heavily Latino South Texas, Biden lost ground compared to Hillary Clinton in 2016, especially in rural counties. However, he still carried the Latino vote in the Rio Grande Valley by double digits and 58% statewide.

In the 2022 U.S. House Elections, 39% of Hispanic voters backed Republican candidates and 60% backed Democratic candidates. This marks a decline for Democrats from the 2020 election, where Biden won roughly 65% of Hispanic voters to Trump's 33%.

== 2024 election ==
Latinos proved extremely helpful in Donald Trump's 2024 presidential victory. Nationwide, according to a Pew Research Center analysis of validated voters, he won 48% of the Latino vote up from 36% in 2020. He also won Latino men outright, with 50% of their vote. As Latinos were crucial to delivering President Joe Biden the White House in 2020, Trump's gains in several swing states helped him win back states he lost to Biden, such as Arizona and Nevada.

This shift was most noticeable in Texas and Florida, where Trump widened his electoral margins from 2020. Miami-Dade County, home to the heavily Latino city of Miami, gave 55.35% of its vote to Trump, the first time this has occurred since 1988. Statewide, he won 58% of Latino voters. In South Texas, especially the Rio Grande Valley and other counties along the border, the Democratic vote-shedding that began four years earlier became much more apparent as Donald Trump flipped Hidalgo, Cameron, Webb, Duval, Starr, Culberson, Maverick, and Willacy County. Each of these counties is overwhelmingly Latino, with some having not voted for a Republican presidential candidate for nearly a century. For example, Webb County last voted for a Republican for president in 1912, while Duval and Starr Counties had not voted for a Republican since 1904 and 1892, respectively. Statewide, Trump received 55% of Texas's Latino vote.

== 2026 elections ==
In Texas, Democrats won every single statewide office ballot in 2026. State representative Gina Hinojosa defeated Governor Greg Abbott, becoming the first Latina governor of Texas and the first Democrat elected governor there since 1990. James Talarico defeated Ken Paxton in the U.S Senate race, the first Democratic Senate win in Texas since 1988. Axios reported that Latino voters' turn away from the Republican party helped drive the Democratic upsets in the state.

== Voting history ==
Year	Candidate of the plurality	Political party	% of Hispanic vote	Result
1980	Jimmy Carter	Democratic	56%	Lost
1984	Walter Mondale	Democratic	61%	Lost
1988	Michael Dukakis	Democratic	69%	Lost
1992	Bill Clinton	Democratic	61%	Won
1996	Bill Clinton	Democratic	72%	Won
2000	Al Gore	Democratic	62%	Lost
2004	John Kerry	Democratic	58%	Lost
2008	Barack Obama	Democratic	67%	Won
2012	Barack Obama	Democratic	71%	Won
2016	Hillary Clinton	Democratic	66%	Lost
2020	Joe Biden	Democratic	61%	Won
2024	Kamala Harris	Democratic	51%	Lost

== See also ==
- Hispanic and Latino Americans in politics
- Hispanic and Latino conservatism in the United States
- Hispanic Voter Project
- Politics of the United States
- Race and ethnicity in the United States
- United States presidential election
- American Jews in politics
- Catholic Church and politics in the United States
- Identity politics
- History of ethnocultural politics in the United States
