= BICOM =

BICOM may refer to:

- Britain Israel Communications and Research Centre
- Brunel Institute of Computational Mathematics
- Bioresonance therapy, pseudoscientific medical practice
