= Britain Israel Communications and Research Centre =

Political organization in the UK

British Israel Communication and Research Centre
- Founded: 2002; 24 years ago
- Founder: Poju Zabludowicz
- Type: Non-profit; NGO
- Location: London, United Kingdom
- Chief Executive: Richard Pater

The Britain Israel Communications and Research Centre (BICOM) is a UK-based organisation which acts to promote Israel in the United Kingdom. BICOM publishes materials such as briefings and a journal, Fathom, covering the history, economy, culture and politics of Israel, Middle East peace plans, terrorism in the Middle East, UK-Israel relations and foreign policy.

== History ==
After the outbreak of the Second Intifada, British Jews founded the Britain Israel Communications and Research Centre (BICOM) to promote a more supportive environment for Israel in the UK, principally through work with the media. In 2005, Ruth Smeeth joined as director of public affairs and campaigns. In 2009, it was described as "one of the most persistent and slickest media operations in the battle for influence over opinion formers".

== Fathom journal ==
In November 2012, BICOM launched Fathom, a quarterly online journal edited by Professor Alan Johnson and deputy edited by scholar Toby Greene. According to Johnson, the journal would present a wide range of voices and seek to "paint an honest and nuanced portrait of Israel as it is, even if not always flattering." As of 2014, Fathom had 30,000 readers, mostly in the UK, but also in Europe, the United States, and Israel. As an adjunct to the journal, BICOM ran Fathom seminars for members of the think tank community, academics, and policymakers.

Contributors to Fathom include journalists David Landau and Aluf Benn of Haaretz, Dave Rich, scholar David Hirsh, and author Steven Lee Beeber.

Martin Sherman of the Israel Institute for Strategic Studies accused Fathom in 2016 of "stifling debate" by refusing to publish articles by writers who oppose the two-state solution from an Israeli right wing perspective.

== See also ==
- Israel lobby in the United Kingdom
