= Adam LeBor =

British journalist and writer

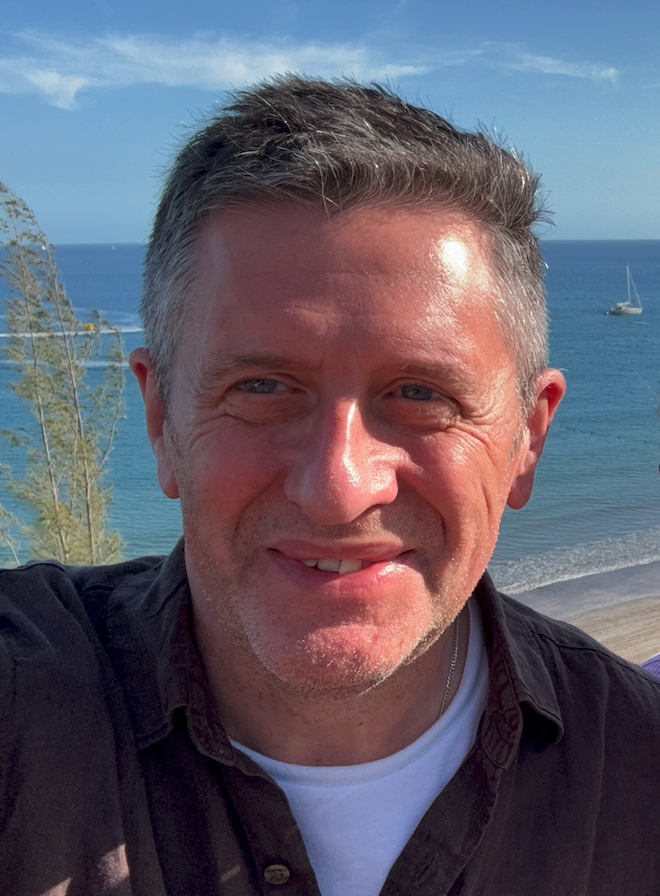
Adam LeBor in 2026.

Adam LeBor is a British author, journalist, writing coach and editorial trainer. Born in London, he worked as a foreign correspondent from 1991 for many years, mainly covering Hungary, central Europe and the Balkans for newspapers including The Times, the Independent and the Economist. LeBor has also lived in Berlin and Paris and spent substantial amounts of time reporting from the former Yugoslavia. He covered the collapse of Communism and the Yugoslav wars for The Independent and The Times and has worked in more than thirty countries, some of which inspired his book writing.

He currently contributes to The Times, the Financial Times, where he reviews thrillers, The Critic, Monocle and several other publications. He works as an editorial trainer and writing coach for Economist Education, the Financial Times, Citywire and Monocle and is a former contributor to Harry's Place.

LeBor has written nine non-fiction books, including Hitler's Secret Bankers, which exposed Swiss complicity with the Nazis and which was shortlisted for the Orwell Prize, a biography of Slobodan Milosevic and City of Oranges, an account of Jewish and Arab families in Jaffa, which was shortlisted for the Jewish Quarterly Prize. His books have been published in fourteen languages including Chinese, Hebrew and Japanese. His most recent work is The Last Days of Budapest, the first English-language history of the Hungarian capital during the Second World War. Published in early 2025, the book received high praise and was Book of the Week in The Times in January 2025.

As well as non-fiction, LeBor has written two critically-acclaimed crime and thriller trilogies, which draw on and were partly inspired by his journalism. The Danube Blues trilogy - District VIII, Kossuth Square and Dohany Street - features Balthazar Kovacs, a Roma cop in the Budapest murder squad. The first two volumes unfold in Budapest during the refugee crisis of 2015 and 2016 when the city was a staging post for tens of thousands of migrants journeying to Austria and Germany. The third, Dohany Street, also takes place in Budapest but deals with themes of Holocaust justice and restitution.

The Yael Azoulay United Nations thriller trilogy partly draws on LeBor's work as a reporter in the former Yugoslavia during the Balkan wars of the early 1990s and his experiences with United Nations peacekeepers. Azoulay is a former Israeli intelligence operative, now working as the special envoy for the UN Secretary General, cutting deals behind the scenes. The series is global in its settings, with storylines that roam from Congo to Iran, Iceland and Manhattan, as Yael also delves into her own past and her family's links to a shadowy private intelligence organisation.

LeBor's first thriller, The Budapest Protocol, was partly inspired by his own experience as a foreign correspondent in Budapest and also by the Red House Report, a 1944 US intelligence report about Nazi plans for post-war Europe (see below section).

== Non-fiction and historical works ==
The Last Days of Budapest : Spies, Nazis, Rescuers and Resistance 1940-1945, published in the United Kingdom in January 2025, to be published in the United States in April 2025. The first English-language account of the Hungarian capital during the Second World War.

Tower of Basel: the Shadowy History of the Secret Bank that Runs the World, 2013, to be published in an updated edition in autumn 2025. The first investigative history of the Bank for International Settlements, the bank for central banks.

Hitler's Secret Bankers: How Switzerland Profited from Nazi Genocide, first published in 1997, updated edition with new material published in 2020. An investigative history of Switzerland's wartime economic links with Nazi Germany.

City of Oranges: An Intimate History of Arabs and Jews in Jaffa, first published in 2006, updated edition published in 2018. An account of Israel and Palestine from 1920 to the present day, told through the lives of Arab and Jewish families in Jaffa.

The Believers: How America fell for Bernard Madoff's $65 billion Investment Scam, 2009. An exploration of the psychological roots of the Bernie Madoff pyramid scheme and why so many people invested in it.

Complicity with Evil: the United Nations in the Age of Modern Genocide, 2006. An investigative history of the UN's failure to prevent genocide in Bosnia, Rwanda and Darfur.

Milosevic: A Biography, 2002. The first full-length account of the life of the former Serbian leader.

Seduced by Hitler: Choice, Corruption and Compromise in the Third Reich (co-authored with Roger Boyes), 2001. An exploration of the ethical choices and compromises of life and death in Nazi Germany.

A Heart Turned East: Among the Muslims of Europe and America, 1997. A journey through the lives and communities of Muslim migrants in the west.

== Thrillers ==
Danube Blues: Balthazar Kovacs detective series:

Dohany Street, 2022.

Kossuth Square, 2020.

District VIII, 2017.

Yael Azoulay United Nations thriller series:

The Reykjavik Assignment, 2016.

The Washington Stratagem, 2015.

The Geneva Option, 2013.

The Budapest Protocol, 2010.

The Red House Report

LeBor's first novel, the Budapest Protocol was partly inspired by a US military intelligence document, Intelligence Report EW-Pa 128, dated 27 November 1944, datelined London, which was declassified by the US National Archives in 1996. The document, known as the Red House Report, also featured in LeBor's non-fiction work, Hitler's Secret Bankers. The Red House Report is based on information supplied by an agent of French intelligence, who attended a meeting of Nazi officials and German industrialists at the Maison Rouge (Red House) hotel in Strasbourg on 10 August 1944. The report, a copy of which is included in The Budapest Protocol, outlines the industrialists' plans for the post-war resurrection of Germany. While some have questioned the document's authenticity, it includes the date of declassification, 6 May 1996, and the authorisation code: NND765055. National Archives and Records Administration archivist Tom McAnear identified the series (NND 765055) noting that it refers to over 2,000 boxes and declared that without more information in the way of a citation there is no way to easily locate this document or verify authenticity.
