= Democratiya =

Defunct British online review of books

- Editor: Alan Johnson
- Categories: Politics
- Frequency: Quarterly
- First issue: Summer 2005
- Final issue: Spring 2009
- Country: United Kingdom
- Language: English

Democratiya was a free quarterly online review of books with the aim to "stimulate discussion of radical democratic political theory". Sixteen editions were produced from 2005 until a final edition in Autumn 2009, after which Democratiya merged with Dissent magazine.

Democratiya’s founding editor was Alan Johnson, a professor in the Department of Social and Psychological Sciences at Edge Hill University in Lancashire, England, and a co-author of the Euston Manifesto.

Democratiya’s topics ranged over many issues, including those relating to war, human rights, the United Nations, democracy, and the international community.

== Books ==
Alan Johnson edited and wrote the introduction to a 2008 collection, Global Politics After 9/11: The Democratiya Interviews, containing conversations about the dilemmas of progressive foreign policy after 9/11, that had first been published in Democratiya. The collection includes interviews with Paul Berman, Ladan Boroumand, Jean Bethke Elshtain, David Held, Saad Eddin Ibrahim, Mary Kaldor, Kanan Makiya, Joshua Muravchik, Martin Shaw, and Anne-Marie Slaughter.

== Articles ==
- Horowitz, Rachelle (Winter 2007). "Tom Kahn and the fight for democracy: A political portrait and personal recollection". Democratiya. 11: 204–251. Archived from the original on 27 June 2023.
- Kahn, Tom; Podhoretz, Norman (Summer 2008). "How to support Solidarność: A debate". Democratiya. 13: 230–261. Archived from the original on 27 June 2023.
