= Harry's Place =

British political blog

Harry's Place is a right wing conservative British Zionist blog that supports hawkish foreign policy. It is notable for being one of the first influential political blogs in Britain. In 2005, Harry's Place got 9,000 visitors a day, about half the traffic of Samizdata which was then Britain's most popular political blog.

The blog was founded by former liberals who cut ties with that political ideology after the September 11 attacks.

== Politics ==
Harry's Place was supportive of the 2003 invasion of Iraq, the concept of liberal interventionism, and liberal dissident movements in the Islamic world. It is a supporter of a two-state solution to the Israeli–Palestinian conflict. It is opposed to Islamism and what it characterises as totalitarian, Islamist and antisemitic tendencies in its ranks. Figures associated with these tendencies are often strongly criticized, including Raed Salah, and Yusuf al-Qaradawi.

In the context of UK politics, the site is particularly critical of Jeremy Corbyn, George Galloway, Ken Livingstone, the Socialist Workers Party, and the Stop the War Coalition. It defines itself as a staunch opponent of religious and political censorship of all kinds and was supportive of the 2006 London March for Free Expression. The site was also one of the main backers of the Euston Manifesto. Nick Cohen has argued that Harry's Place was one of only few places where it was being noted that "a section of the left is allied with religious fanaticism and, for the first time since the Hitler-Stalin pact, [...] has gone soft on fascism".

"Harry Hatchet" has had several guest columns in The Guardian's technology and online commentary sections. However, Guardian editorial policies are commonly criticized by Harry's Place contributors.

It was on the shortlist for the 2005 Guardian award for political blogs, the 2005 Weblog awards for UK blogs.

== Contributors ==
Harry's Place relies mostly on anonymous writers using pseudonyms. It was originally started by a blogger, using the nom de plumes Harry Steele and Harry Hatchet or just Harry, who was originally the sole writer. The 11 September 2001 attacks on the World Trade Center served as a "wake up call" according to Harry, prompting him to try to better understand what political forces led up to it. In 2002, he began blogging as a way to clarify his own thoughts on political issues such as the impending war in Iraq, moving away from his Communism to embrace a more moderate social-democratic worldview. He made a public break with his former views in a Workers' Liberty message board discussion in October 2002, where he said Stalinism was a viewpoint "I now reject totally".

The rapid growth in the site's audience led him to include other like-minded writers so that the blog could be updated more regularly. Harry ceased to contribute regularly at the end of September 2005.

Other contributors have included Marcus, Gene Zitver (aka "Gene"), David Toube ( General Counsel of The Jewish Leadership Council), and more recently, Adam LeBor, Brett Lock, Brian Meredith, Edmund Standing, Hasan Afzal, Michael Ezra, 'Lucy Lips', Rabbi Zvi Solomons ( columnist with the Jewish Telegraph and the Jewish News ) and others. Marcus attended the 15 February, 2003 anti-war protest in London, and came away with the opinion that "I don't know if I can consider myself left-wing anymore if this is the left". Marcus wrote about his views on the politics behind the 15 February demonstration, and soon became a regular contributor. Gene is a resident of the United States from a trade union background, who has spent several years living in Israel. Harry came across Gene's posts on a George Orwell discussion list, and invited him to start posting on his blog. Gene was a strong opponent of President Hugo Chavez of Venezuela, whom he accused of being authoritarian. Some Harry's Place writers post under pseudonyms: the pseudonyms used include Lucy Lips, habibi, Libby T, Israelinurse, and Alan A.

David Toube, signatory to the Euston Manifesto, is a lawyer and former lecturer, and director of policy at Quilliam. He also came to blogging after the 11 September attacks. One of his close childhood friends was among those killed in the World Trade Center, while another close childhood friend became a militant Islamist, and appeared in the media applauding the attacks. Toube has said that he took up reading and writing blogs as a way of trying to making sense of these events. Johann Hari also contributed articles to the weblog until Autumn 2004, when he left to start his own blog.

Adam LeBor (previously shortlisted for the Orwell Prize) has also contributed to the blog.

== Controversies ==
On 26 August 2008, Harry's Place was briefly offline following a complaint to its DNS provider. The site had reported that a member of the university and college union's discussion list named Jenna Delich had posted links to American white nationalist David Duke's website to support the call for a boycott on Israel. The DNS service was pulled when Delich's supporters from the pro-Palestinian UCU caucus threatened a libel lawsuit against HP for publishing her info and a picture of her (the information remained in place, while the photo was deleted the day after it was posted). Soon after, the service was restored and no legal action was taken in the future.
