= David Hirsh =

British sociologist (born 1967)

David Hirsh (born 29 September 1967) is a professor of sociology at Goldsmiths, University of London, and co-founder of Engage, a campaign against the academic boycott of Israel.

== Early life and education ==
Hirsh was raised in a Jewish family in Highgate, London and attended Highgate School until he was 15, when he persuaded his parents to allow him to transfer to Woodhouse Grammar School. For several years, he was a member of the Trotskyist Alliance for Workers' Liberty and, during the 1980s, a leading activist in the National Organisation of Labour Students. He briefly studied physics at Sheffield University, then worked as a driver for several years. He is a graduate of City University, London and holds an M.A. in Philosophy and Social Theory and a PhD from the University of Warwick, writing his dissertation on Crimes Against Humanity and International Law.

== Career ==
Hirsh won the British Sociological Association Philip Abrams Memorial Prize for the best first book in sociology for 2004, for his book Law Against Genocide: Cosmopolitan trials. The book, on the significance of "cosmopolitan law", contains an account of the 1999 British trial of Anthony Sawoniuk for Holocaust-related crimes committed in Belarus in 1942.

In 2005, he co-founded the Engage website, a resource for those working to oppose the boycott of Israel. In 2005–2007, Hirsh was involved in opposing boycotts of Israeli universities proposed by British academics. Hirsh told The Guardian, "It may not have anti-semitic motivations, but if you organise an academic boycott of Israeli Jewish academics but no-one else in the world, that is an anti-semitic policy".

His 2017 book, Contemporary Left Antisemitism, which combined narrative and case study with sociological analysis and theory to understand the controversial and contested phenomenon of antisemitism on the left, was published in 2017.

He developed, with Daniel Allington, the AzAs (Antizionist Antisemitism) Scale, for quantitatively measuring antisemitism as expressed in relation to Israel and its supporters. In a 2022 follow-up article, he wrote that the word "Zionist" had been transformed into an antisemitic code word for "Jews" by some intellectuals in contemporary academic discourse. He said this contributed to the continued presence of institutional antisemitism, and that the adoption of the "IHRA definition" of antisemitism to was needed to address the issue. He also said,

the left-wing tradition of antizionism, which professes unconditional opposition to antisemitism, is only one tradition. In the real world that tradition finds itself in a broad alliance with antisemitic movements that do not find the distinction between hostility to Israel and hostility to Jews to be of much significance. It is impossible to tell whether an element of antizionist rhetoric is right-wing, left-wing, or Islamist. Antizionism does not allow Jews, individuals or communities, to define their own identities. It defines their Zionism for them, against their will, and without consultation. It defines Zionism as racism and as support for an apartheid state. In so doing it defines most Jews as alien to any decent community of human beings.

He is the Academic Director and Chief Executive Officer of the London Centre for the Study of Contemporary Antisemitism, which has the stated mission to "challenge the intellectual underpinnings of antisemitism in public life".

=== Livingstone Formulation ===
Hirsh originated the term "Livingstone Formulation", named after Ken Livingstone, as the claim made by those accused of antisemitism that the accusation is made in order to delegitimise their criticism of Israel; he says it is accusing Jews of playing the race card. Alvin Hirsch Rosenfeld described the Livingstone Formulation as "a common trope of contemporary antisemitism in the United Kingdom." The Committee for Accuracy in Middle East Reporting in America (CAMERA), a pro-Israel group, has accused the BBC of using the Livingstone Formulation routinely, with statements such as "Others say the Israeli government and its supporters are deliberately confusing anti-Zionism with antisemitism to avoid criticism."

== Published works ==
- Law against Genocide: Cosmopolitan trials, (2003) London: GlassHouse Press, Cavendish Publishing
- Anti-Zionism and Antisemitism: Cosmopolitan Reflections, The Yale Initiative for the Interdisciplinary Study of Antisemitism (YIISA) Working Paper Series #1, New Haven CT (2007)
- "Law against genocide" in Freeman, M, (ed) Law and sociology (2006), Oxford: Oxford University Press.
- "The trial of Andrei Sawoniuk: Holocaust testimony under cross-examination" in Social and Legal Studies, Vol 10, Issue 4, pp 531–545 (2001)
- With Robert Fine, "The decision to commit a crime against humanity" in Archer, M and Tritter, J (eds), Rational Choice Theory: Resisting colonisation (2000) London: Routledge
- "Accusations of malicious intent in debates about the Palestine-Israel conflict and about antisemitism. The "Livingstone Formulation", 'playing the antisemitism card' and contesting the boundaries of antiracist discourse." in Transversal. Zeitschrift für Jüdische Studien. University of Graz, Centrum für Jüdische Studien. Graz: Studienverlag ISSN 1607-629X, Vol 11, Issue 1, (2010) pp 47 – 77
- "Hostility to Israel and Antisemitism: Toward a Sociological Approach" in EngageOnline Journal for the Study of Antisemitism, (2013) JSA Vol 5#1
- The Corbyn left: the politics of position and the politics of reason in fathom, Autumn (2015)
- "How raising the issue of antisemitism puts you outside the community of the progressive: The Livingstone Formulation"Eunice G. Pollack, ed., Anti-Zionism and Antisemitism: Past & Present (Boston: Academic Studies Press, 2016)
- Book Review | Jews and the Left: the Rise and Fall of a Political Alliance, Fathom, Winter 2015
- Contemporary Left Antisemitism, (2018) London: Routledge.
- "How the word ‘Zionist’ functions in antisemitic vocabulary" in Journal of Contemporary Antisemitism, Vol 4, Issue 2, (2022) ISSN 2472-9906
- Hirsh, David; Miller, Hilary (2022). "Durban Antizionism: Its Sources, its Impact, and Its Relation to Older Anti-Jewish Ideologies" (PDF). Journal of Contemporary Antisemitism. 5 (1). ISSN 2472-9906.
- Edited by David Hirsh, "The Rebirth of Antisemitism in the 21st Century: From the Academic Boycott Campaign into the Mainstream" (2023) London: Routledge ISBN 9781032116624
