= Hispanic Voter Project =

Research project established in 2002

The Hispanic Voter Project at Johns Hopkins University is a non-partisan, non-profit academic research effort based at the JHU Zanvyl Krieger School of Arts and Sciences in Washington, DC, that examines the Hispanic outreach efforts of candidates, political parties and third party interest groups.

== History ==
The Hispanic Voter Project was established by Adam J. Segal, a Hopkins graduate and Faculty Lecturer, in 2002. Segal continues to serve as the project's director.

The project has published reports and data from the 2000 presidential election, 2002 mid-term congressional election, 2004 presidential election, 2006 mid-term congressional election and 2008 presidential election. The Hispanic Voter Project's research has been cited by national media throughout the United States including The New York Times, U.S. News & World Report, National Public Radio, CNN and others.

Dr. Benjamin Ginsberg, the JHU David Bernstein Professor and Director of the JHU Washington Center for the Study of American Government, was the project’s founding academic adviser.

== Special programs ==
The project has received extensive national and international attention for its research into Spanish-language political television and radio advertising.

The Hispanic Voter Project was a founding member of the 1-866-MY-VOTE1 voter alert line in 2004 with the Fels Institute for Government at the University of Pennsylvania, Common Cause, the Reform Institute and the National Constitution Center in Philadelphia, Pennsylvania. NBC News, MSNBC and Telemundo were the national media partners for the project on Election Day 2004.
