= Engage (organisation) =

Organisation to combat anti-Senitism

Engage is a British website, and briefly an online journal (from 2006–07), that aims to help people counter the boycott Israel campaign. Engage describes its mission as to "challenge left and liberal antisemitism in the labour movement, in our universities and in public life."

== Anti boycott activity ==
In 2005, the Association of University Teachers (AUT) took a decision to boycott two Israeli universities. Engage was founded, by David Hirsh, who teaches at Goldsmiths, University of London, and Jon Pike, who teaches at the Open University, in order to try to reverse this, which, with the involvement of Academic Friends of Israel, occurred within a few weeks. Supporters of Engage included the late Norman Geras and the late David Cesarani. In 2006, the AUT merged with the National Association of Teachers in Further and Higher Education, and proposed a Boycott Israel measure that Hirsh, speaking on behalf of Engage, called "nastier" than the 2005 proposal, because it proposed the boycott of individual academics who refused to disassociate themselves with Israel. Hirsh was also quoted in relation to a proposed boycott of Israeli academic institutions by the University and College Union in 2007.

== External views ==
In an essay, in the New Statesman, Nick Cohen described Engage's position as pointing out that "the act of singling out Israel as the only illegitimate state – in the absence of any coherent reason for doing so – is in itself anti-Semitic, irrespective of the motivation or opinions of those who make that claim," and noting that the Association of University Teachers provided no justification for singling out the Jewish State. An article in the online journal of International Marxist Tendency described Engage as "a group of academics... ostensibly set up to combat 'left-wing anti-Semitism' (but which in reality devotes much of its website space to articles beautifying Israeli foreign policy from a 'liberal' standpoint.)" Leslie Wright observed that "Engage's activities range from earnest theoretical debates about left-wing ideology to practical campaigning to ensure the election of antiboycott candidates in academic union elections".

== Positions ==
According to its founding statement, the organisation:

- Opposes Israel's occupation of the West Bank and Gaza. Engage is in favour of the foundation of a Palestinian state alongside the state of Israel.
- Opposes the idea of an academic or cultural boycott of Israel.
- Aims to encourage, facilitate and publicise positive links between both Arab and Jewish Israeli, Palestinian, British and global academia.
- Stands up against antisemitism in universities, in unions and in students unions. In Engage's opinion, opposing the sometimes brutal actions of the Israeli government and army is not antisemitic, but certain expressions of criticism of Israel constitute antisemitism.
