= Euston Manifesto =

British political manifesto of 2006

The Euston Manifesto (/ˈjuːstən/ YOO-stən) is a 2006 declaration of principles signed by a group of academics, journalists and activists based in the United Kingdom, named after Euston Road in London where it had its meetings. The statement was a reaction to what the writers argued to be widespread violations of left-wing principles by others who were commonly associated with the Left. The manifesto states that "the reconfiguration of progressive opinion that we aim for involves drawing a line between forces on the Left that remain true to its authentic values, and currents that have lately shown themselves rather too flexible about these values".

The manifesto proposed a "fresh political alignment", which involves "making common cause with genuine democrats, whether socialist or not", in which the Left stands for democracy, freedom, equality, internationalism, the open-source movement and historical truth, while condemning all forms of tyranny, terrorism, anti-Americanism, racism and antisemitism, including any form of it that "conceal[s] prejudice against the Jewish people behind the formula of 'anti-Zionism'".

The signatories said they "reject fear of modernity, fear of freedom, irrationalism, the subordination of women", and

reaffirm the ideas that inspired the great rallying calls of the democratic revolutions of the eighteenth century: liberty, equality and solidarity; human rights; the pursuit of happiness ... But we are not zealots. For we embrace also the values of free enquiry, open dialogue and creative doubt, of care in judgement and a sense of the intractabilities of the world. We stand against all claims to a total — unquestionable or unquestioning — truth.

== Euston Manifesto Group ==
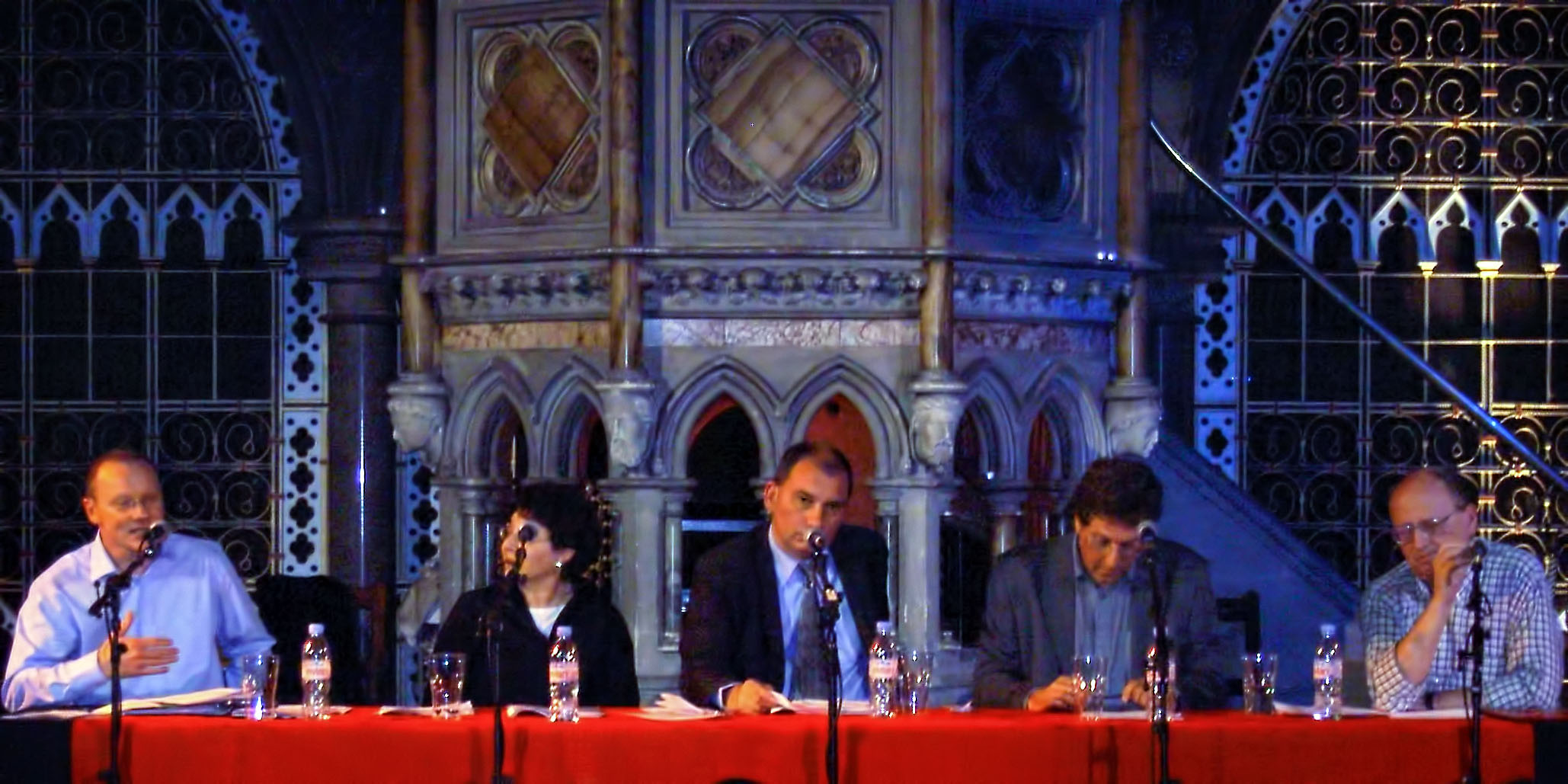
The panel at the public launch of the Euston Manifesto. From left to right: Alan Johnson, Eve Garrard, Nick Cohen, Shalom Lappin and Norman Geras.

The authors and their collaborators call themselves the "Euston Manifesto Group". There are about thirty members of the group, and a larger number of signatories, four of whom were most heavily involved in authoring the document: Norman Geras, Marxist scholar and professor emeritus at Manchester University; Damian Counsell; Alan Johnson, editor of Democratiya; and Shalom Lappin. Other members included Nick Cohen of The Observer, who co-authored with Geras a report on the manifesto for the New Statesman; Marc Cooper of The Nation; Francis Wheen, a journalist; and historian Marko Attila Hoare. Signatories include figures such as Padraig Reidy, editor of Little Atoms; Neil Denny, Interview Editor of Little Atoms; Oliver Kamm, columnist at The Times; Paul Anderson, a former deputy editor at the New Statesman among many others.

The manifesto began as a conversation between friends, a gathering of (mainly British) academics, journalists, and activists. At their first meeting in London they decided to write a "minimal manifesto", a short document summarising their core values. The original intention of its proposer was that the manifesto would provide a rallying point for a number of left-leaning blogs, to be collected by an aggregator, and the basis for a book collecting some of the best writing about related political questions. The group met more formally after the document's first drafting, at a branch of the O'Neill's Irish-themed pub chain on London's Euston Road—just across the road from the British Library—where the manifesto was named, and its content voted on.

Early signatories of the American statement included Ronald Radosh, Martin Peretz, Daniel Jonah Goldhagen, Michael Ledeen and Walter Laqueur.

== Summary of the manifesto ==
The authors start by identifying themselves as "progressives and democrats" and calling for a new political alignment in which the left stands unambiguously for democracy, and against tyranny and terrorism. Additionally the authors note that, while they all identify as leftists or liberals, their anti-totalitarian ideals are not exclusive to any one point on the political spectrum. Following this, the manifesto lists and explains the core principles of their ideology:

=== Democracy, tyranny, and human rights ===
First and foremost, the authors say, the manifesto stands in support of pluralist democracy, including free expression, political freedom, and the separation of powers of government. The authors note that the most effective governments in the world today are democracies.

Conversely they strongly condemn tyrannical governments, regardless of the circumstances (i.e., during the Cold War, supporting right-wing dictators in opposition to Communism was immoral, just as supporting totalitarian communism was equally repugnant). The authors "draw a firm line" between themselves and those on the left who might support authoritarian regimes (e.g., those who would support totalitarian communism in pursuit of social progress).

The authors strongly support the Universal Declaration of Human Rights, dismissing all arguments against the idea of eternal truths. They believe that no circumstance can justify ignoring a human right. In particular they reject cultural relativism, the belief that different cultures can have different standards and that one culture may not legitimately judge another. Also they condemn what they see as a willingness by some on the left to criticise minor (although real) violations of rights at home, while ignoring or excusing much greater violations abroad.

=== Equality and development ===
The manifesto is strongly supportive of egalitarian principles. While they intentionally do not specify their preferred economic system, the authors say that a fundamental tenet of left-liberalism must be economic and social equality between people of all races, religions, genders, and sexual orientations. Within this, they say labour unions are "bedrock organizations in the defence of workers' interests and are one of the most important forces for human rights, democracy-promotion and egalitarian internationalism". They also say "labour rights are human rights" and single out different, less-commonly represented people, including children and the sexually oppressed.

As part of promoting economic equality the authors call for supporting increased development in poorer nations, in order to alleviate extreme poverty. Their prescription for this includes greater distribution of wealth within the trading system, and radical reform of the World Trade Organization, World Bank and International Monetary Fund. They also call for fair trade, environmental protection, debt forgiveness and more aid. They support the campaign to Make Poverty History.

=== Opposing anti-Americanism ===
The authors stand unambiguously in support of the United States—the country and its people—while still allowing for criticism of its government and foreign policy. While noting that the United States is "not a model society", the authors note that it is a strong and stable democracy. In particular they commend America for its "vibrant culture". This said, they note that America has in the past supported dictators, contrary to the values of the manifesto.

=== Israel and Palestine ===
Statement of Principles no.7 of the Manifesto reads: "We recognize the right of both the Israeli and the Palestinian peoples to self-determination within the framework of a two-state solution. There can be no reasonable resolution of the Israeli-Palestinian conflict that subordinates or eliminates the legitimate rights and interests of one of the sides to the dispute."

=== Against racism and terrorism ===
The manifesto is opposed to all forms of racism, including anti-immigration, intertribal conflict and other forms of discrimination. The authors draw particular attention to what they describe as the recent resurgence of antisemitism, believing that some leftists have attempted to hide antisemitism under a cover of anti-Zionism.

In strong language the authors condemn and reject all forms of terrorism (defined by them as the intentional targeting of civilians) and call it a violation of international law and the laws of war. In their view nothing can excuse terrorism. They single out Islamist terrorism as particularly heinous. They do however defend Muslims, saying that within that faith can be found the victims of terrorism's worst atrocities and its most vigorous opponents.

=== A new internationalism ===
The manifesto calls for the reform of international law in the interests of "global democracy and global development". It supports the doctrine of humanitarian intervention and argues that a state's sovereignty should be respected only if "it does not torture, murder and slaughter its own civilians, and meets their most basic needs of life". If it fails in this duty, "there is a duty upon the international community of intervention and rescue". The form of such an intervention is not specified, but possible interpretations include diplomacy, economic sanctions, and military action. This implied support for military action is one of the main points of disagreement between the manifesto's authors and their critics.

=== Historical truth, openness, and heritage ===
The manifesto argues that pluralism within the movements of the left is essential. The authors promise to criticise in forthright terms those leftists who ally with "illiberal theocrats" or other anti-democratic figures and organisations. Additionally they promise to listen to the ideas of both the left and the right, if such communications are made in the hopes of furthering democracy.

The manifesto emphasises the duty which genuine democrats have to respect historical truth, and to practice political honesty and straightforwardness. It claims that the reputation of the left was tarnished in this regard by the International Communist movement. It argues that some elements of the anti-war movement are guilty of making the same mistake in being too willing to work with "Islamist fascist" organisations.

Later in the manifesto the legacy of democratic movements is recalled. The authors say that they are the latest in a long line of activists committed to the spread of human rights and free expression. They recall specifically the revolutions of the eighteenth century (most prominent among them the French Revolution).

=== Freedom of ideas and open-source software ===
According to the manifesto, people must be allowed to express and criticise opinions within the traditional constraints against libel, slander, and incitement to violence. Here, religion is singled out as fair game for expression and criticism alike. However the authors say that this right should be tempered by the personal responsibility of the speaker.

There is also strong sentiment among the authors in favor of open-source software and an opposition to many types of intellectual property rights. The authors reject the idea that free software is simply theoretical, instead believing it "a tested reality that has created common goods whose power and robustness have been proved over decades".

=== Elaboration ===
In the final section the authors elaborate on specific world issues. Most prominently they condemn those who call the Iraqi insurgency "freedom fighters" and they reiterate their own opposition to the previous Baathist regime. Furthermore, they argue that the focus of the left—regardless of how someone might have felt about the invasion—must be on supporting the creation of a stable democracy in Iraq. Again the authors emphasize their egalitarian principles, saying that global inequality represents a "standing indictment of the international community."

== Reception ==
Signatories were asked to place this button on their blogs.

The manifesto was published in the New Statesman and in the "Comment is Free" section of The Guardian, then was launched formally on 25 May 2006 at the Union Chapel in Islington.

It generated much lively debate on British and American blogs on the day of publication. Its critics argued it contained too many statements of the obvious, that it had little to say about "imperialism" or the power of global corporations, and that it was in reality a front for its authors' support for the current foreign policies of the British and American governments. Its supporters countered that very little of the statement's content had been directly criticised and that its opponents were merely worried that its principles would win broad support on the British left, and thus challenge the consensus among left-liberal opinion that they believe predominates in the mainstream media.

The manifesto takes no position on the invasion of Iraq. However some of its most prominent contributors, including Nick Cohen and the proprietors of the blog Harry's Place, supported the invasion. Of the manifesto's principal authors, two were broadly against the war and two broadly in support. Of eight people advertised as attending a Euston Manifesto Group meeting at the 2006 Labour Party Conference, six supported the Iraq War. One of these, Gisela Stuart MP, declared during the 2004 American presidential election that a victory by challenger John Kerry would prompt "victory celebrations among those who want to destroy liberal democracies".

Some of the manifesto's authors have criticised anti-war figures and groups, including George Galloway and the Stop the War Coalition, for their alliances with Islamists. Although there is still disagreement within the group over the rationale for the war, the authors agree that after the bombs stopped falling the left ought to have united around a campaign to support Iraqi democrats, feminists, and progressives. Instead, in their view, alliances were wrongly formed with Islamist groups and Baathists.

The manifesto states that the left's political focus should be on reconstructing Iraq and instituting a stable democracy. Opponents reject this, saying that the question of invasion is still legitimate, and that the refusal by some authors to oppose the invasion is unacceptable.

== Legacy ==
Australian journalist Guy Rundle argued that the Euston Manifesto's attempt to create a "progressive realignment" in support of democracy in the Middle East has been unsuccessful, as evidenced by the failure of Euston signatories to take a consistent stand of supporting Israel in the 2006 Lebanon War over which he states Euston Manifesto signatories "have overwhelmingly divided along pre-existing political lines". He argues that "any attempt to use the collective power of the manifesto to make an impact would reveal that it has no collective power. Its attempt to build a broad virtual coalition has left it as a statement of liberal universalisms with no character, and allowed it to be defined by what it opposes, the mainstream anti-war movement... the EM group merely reproduces the confusion and atomisation of the Blogosphere in a new form".

Looking back at the manifesto in April 2008, Daniel Davies, a contributor to The Guardian, noted that the group had become largely inactive and claimed that one of its leading members, Alan Johnson, had abandoned Euston's key principle of "human rights for all" by advocating Britain's withdrawal from the European Convention on Human Rights. Davies argued that the group's flaw was "the relentless refusal to actually bring anything down to brass tacks" and that they would demand action on various issues without following through on implementation. According to Davies, "it was this refusal to step down from Mount Olympus that finally did for the Euston Manifesto group. In the early days, it allowed them to assemble a broad coalition, uniting war supporters and opponents under a vague banner of 'that Galloway chappie has gone a bit too far'. But almost as soon as the manifesto was published, it ran into its first big real-world test as Israel invaded Lebanon, and the strains began to show between those Eustonauts like Norman Geras, who had taken seriously the universalist stuff about human rights, and the Atlanticist element who had always assumed that they were joining a movement that would be happy to set all that stuff aside in the name of getting the bad guys".

The website continues to be updated from time to time, but the Euston Manifesto Group seems to be moribund, having not held any public meetings since December 2009.

== See also ==
- Liberal internationalism
- New antisemitism
- Red-green-brown alliance
- Shachtmanism, a similar movement in the 1950s
- Anti-Germans
- Christopher Hitchens
- Regressive Left
