= Views of Richard Dawkins =

Opinions of English biologist and author

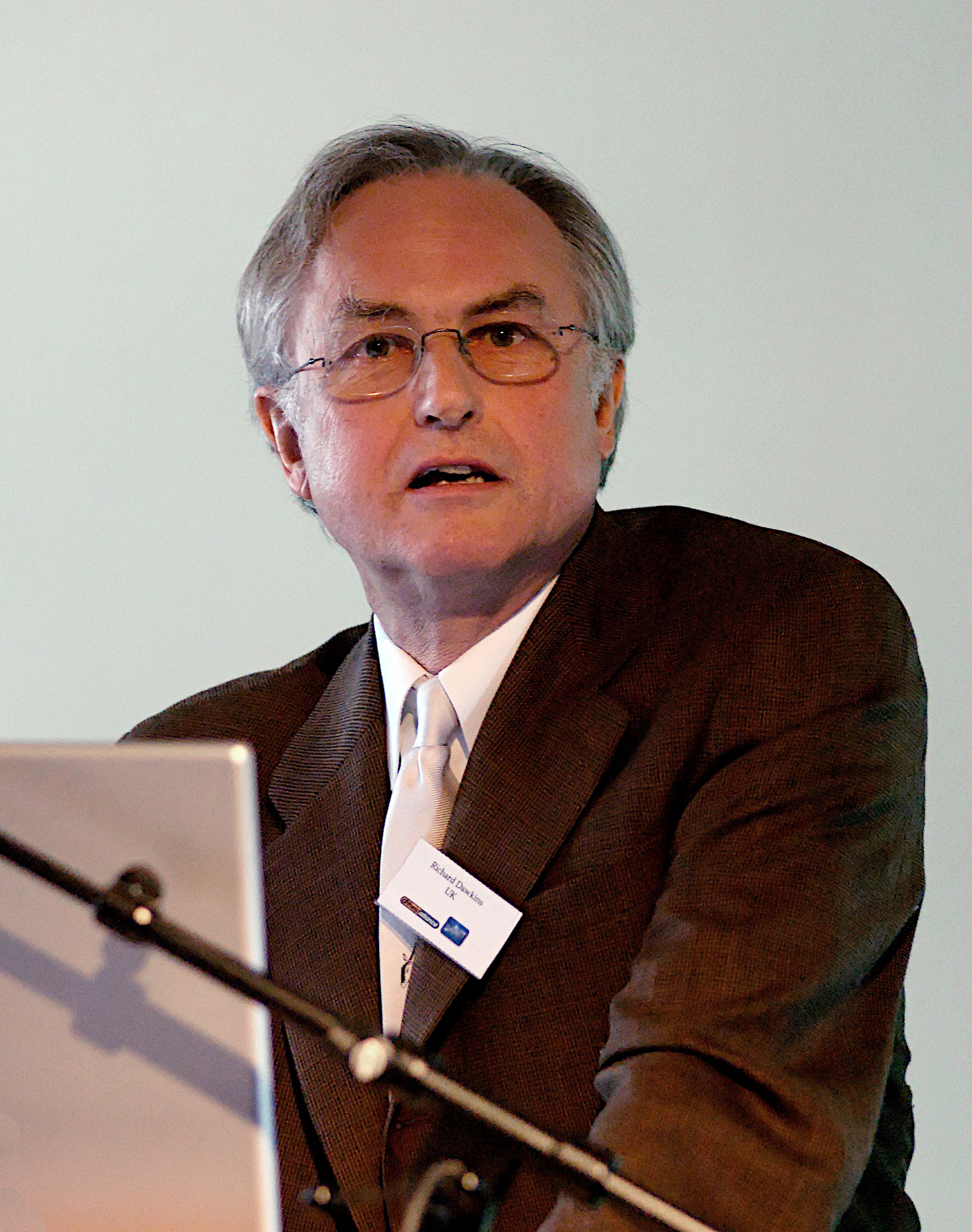
Richard Dawkins in 2006

Richard Dawkins is an English ethologist, evolutionary biologist, and writer.

Dawkins himself has stated that his political views are left-leaning. However, many of Dawkins's political statements have created controversy among left-wing and atheist communities. He simultaneously is a supporter for the British Labour Party and Liberal Democrats. He is a strong advocate for socially progressive stances. Additionally, he strongly supports secular policies.

Dawkins is a vocal atheist, anti-theist, and anti-religionist. He criticizes Christianity and Islam in particular, believing both to be negative influences in the world. This has led to frequent debates.

== Political affiliation ==
=== Labour Party ===
Before the mid-2000s, Dawkins usually voted for Labour Party candidates. The party has often been described as social democratic.

In 2009 Dawkins participated in a New Statesman project called "20 ways to save Labour", in which 20 public figures, including Dawkins as well as Germaine Greer and John Pilger, among others gave suggestions about how to make the Labour Party better. Dawkins's contribution was as follows:

Stop toadying to Muslims and other "faith communities" as part of a general abolition of all religious privilege. Withdraw government support from schools that abuse children by teaching them they belong to a particular religion (as opposed to teaching them about religions and letting them make up their own minds when they are old enough). Abolish the automatic right of religious organisations to charitable status, and the automatic right of bishops to sit in the House of Lords.

=== Liberal Democrats ===
Starting in the mid-2000s, Dawkins has also voted and expressed support for the Liberal Democrats. Dawkins spoke at the party's conference in 2009 and publicly expressed his support then. At the conference, Dawkins strongly criticised the English libel laws, and the party revised its policy on the issue at the same conference. Dawkins also called for an alliance of all Liberal Democrats based on an agreement on electoral reform.

== Social views ==
=== Free expression ===
Dawkins has argued for reform to the English defamation law, arguing that Simon Singh should have the right to criticise scientific claims made by the British Chiropractic Association. In 2009, he said "I and many of my colleagues fear that if Simon loses it will have major implications on the freedom of scientists, researchers and other commentators to engage in robust criticism of scientific and pseudo-scientific work." The Defamation Act 2013 substantially reformed the law.

In 2008, Dawkins pointed out major factual errors in The Atlas of Creation, such as images of fishing lures mislabelled as insects, and subsequently his website was banned in Turkey and Pakistan. Dawkins gave a speech at the 2012 Jaipur Literature Festival where a video link with Salman Rushdie was cancelled due to ongoing controversy over the Rushdie affair. He has given a high appraisal of Nick Cohen's book You Can't Read this Book, arguing that libel laws create a culture of "tacit censorship" in liberal democracies.

In 2009, Dawkins agreed to give a talk at the University of Oklahoma, and the Oklahoma House of Representatives introduced bills attacking him, declaring that his views on evolution are "contrary and offensive to the views and opinions of most citizens of Oklahoma." In his speech, the professor argued that "what's really offensive is the bizarre idea that a state university should only ever hear opinions that its citizens agree with. If that principle is ever accepted you can kiss goodbye anything that a university stands for. What on earth is a university for if it only reinforces opinions that students and the public already hold?" Dawkins has argued against campaigns by far-left groups on university campuses to have speeches by internationally renowned figures cancelled. In a 2015 interview, Dawkins said "If you only ever get exposed to ideas you agree with, what kind of university would that be?" He has argued against campaigns to block speakers like Ayaan Hirsi Ali, Bill Maher, Maryam Namazie and Germaine Greer.

Dawkins expressed solidarity with Stephen Fry after Irish police investigated Fry over blasphemy allegations. Dawkins quoted his book, The God Delusion in The Irish Times: "The God of the Old Testament is arguably the most unpleasant character in all fiction: jealous and proud of it; a petty, unjust, unforgiving control-freak; a vindictive, bloodthirsty ethnic cleanser; a misogynistic, homophobic, racist, infanticidal, genocidal, filicidal, pestilential, megalomaniacal, sadomasochistic, capriciously malevolent bully." Dawkins added that he would be in Ireland on 12 June 2017 and challenged the Irish police to arrest him. Dawkins added in Twitter: "The Irish blasphemy law must go. An embarrassment to the civilised world, it encourages the uncivilised one."

=== Feminism and women's rights ===
Dawkins has said that feminism is "enormously important" and "a political movement that deserves to be supported". Dawkins also released a joint statement with Ophelia Benson that condemned "death threats, rape threats, attacks on people's appearance, age, race, sex, size, haircut ... [and] vulgar epithets." In a passage in The God Delusion, Dawkins wrote about how he wished to mirror the successes of feminism in the atheist movement.

Dawkins has been criticized by feminists and feminist organizations. Several of Dawkins's posts on Twitter were controversial, such as one where he seemed to blame the victims of rape when they are drunk. "If you want to be in a position to testify & jail a man, don't get drunk," he tweeted. Amanda Marcotte, in Salon, criticized Dawkins by saying that "For someone who is a supposed rationalist, Dawkins refused to even acknowledge the basic difference between making the choice to break the law and being the victim of a crime." Dawkins was also the subject of controversy when he tweeted, "Date rape is bad. Stranger rape at knifepoint is worse. If you think that's an endorsement of date rape, go away and learn how to think." Marcotte heavily criticized him by saying that "He made a pretty serious logical error ... He assumed that the amount of pain that a victim of injustice suffers is directly proportional to the contemporary social norms surrounding it, i.e. if a form of abuse was considered no big deal to most people in a society, the people directly victimized would also feel that way."

In January 2016, Dawkins tweeted a link to a cartoon caricature of feminists and Islamists. Dawkins later deleted the tweet when he realized it mocked real people. Organizers of the 2016 Northeast Conference on Science and Skepticism unilaterally declared his tweet "very offensive" and disinvited him without speaking to him. They later spoke to Dawkins on the phone, and apologised for disinviting him, and re-invited him.

==== "Elevatorgate" ====
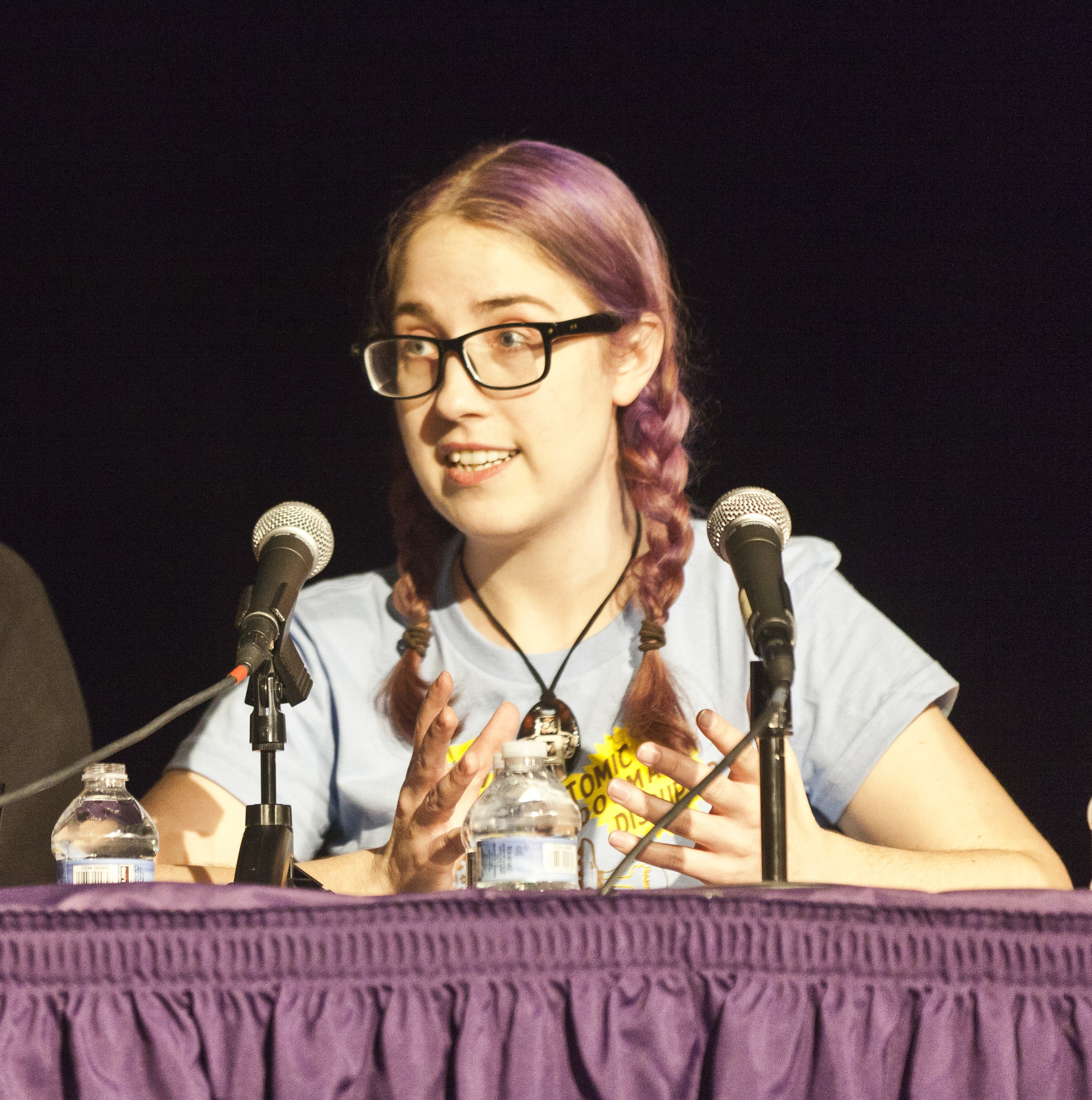
Watson speaking at NECSS in 2011

Dawkins was denounced for his comments about a video blog post by atheist blogger and writer Rebecca Watson. The scandal resulting from his comments was called "Elevatorgate". The controversy started at an atheist convention in Dublin, where Rebecca Watson spoke about feminism and the atheist movement. That night, when Watson was in an elevator, she was propositioned by a man, who said "Don't take this the wrong way, but I find you very interesting, and I would like to talk more. Would you like to come to my hotel room for coffee?" Watson found this extremely inappropriate, and afterwards, she made a video blog saying "guys, don't do that." The comments exploded with divisive opinions, and PZ Myers reacted on his blog Pharyngula. On that post, Dawkins made the following comment in the form of a fictitious letter to a Muslim woman complaining of misogyny:

Dear Muslima

Stop whining, will you. Yes, yes, I know you had your genitals mutilated with a razor blade, and ... yawn ... don't tell me yet again, I know you aren't allowed to drive a car, and you can't leave the house without a male relative, and your husband is allowed to beat you, and you'll be stoned to death if you commit adultery. But stop whining, will you. Think of the suffering your poor American sisters have to put up with.

Only this week I heard of one, she calls herself Skep"chick", and do you know what happened to her? A man in a hotel elevator invited her back to his room for coffee. I am not exaggerating. He really did. He invited her back to his room for coffee. Of course she said no, and of course he didn't lay a finger on her, but even so ...

And you, Muslima, think you have misogyny to complain about! For goodness sake grow up, or at least grow a thicker skin.

Richard [Dawkins]

Dawkins was criticized by atheists and others for his remarks. David Allen Green in New Statesman wrote that "One of the many problems here is that Rebecca didn't use her video to downplay the plight of Muslim women from the perspective of an American woman ... Just because there is severe misogyny in one context doesn't remove the need to deal rationally and helpfully with its lesser manifestation in other contexts." PZ Myers responded by writing, "This isn't slightly bad. It's very bad. Atheist men are alienating the people we want to work with us on the very same problems ... that you cited in your comment."

Dawkins tried to clarify his argument, but this elicited several more negative responses:

The man in the elevator didn't physically touch her, didn't attempt to bar her way out of the elevator, didn't even use foul language at her [...] [Rebecca] was probably offended to about the same extent as I am offended if a man gets into an elevator with me chewing gum.

Watson herself issued the following boycott of Dawkins as a response to his posts:

[Richard Dawkins] will no longer be rewarded with my money, my praise, my attention. I will no longer recommend his books to others, buy them as presents, or buy them for my own library. I will not attend his lectures or recommend that others do the same.

As part of a reaction to the controversy, Skepchick writers wrote open letters to Dawkins explaining why they believed his comments were offensive and misguided.

=== LGBT issues ===
Dawkins strongly argues for a genetic basis for homosexuality and postulates that the gene was preserved through various social and cultural processes. Dawkins has also stated that homosexuality does not conflict with the evolutionary principle. In a talk at Kennesaw State University, he said that "[Evolution] is the explanation for why we exist. It is not something to guide our lives in our own society. [...] What we need is a truly anti-Darwinian society—anti-Darwinian in the sense that we do not wish to live in a society where ... the strongest suppress the weak ... I want to live in a society where we take care of the sick, take care of the weak, take care of the oppressed."

In a 2015 tweet, he stated "Is trans woman a woman? Purely semantic. If you define by chromosomes, no. If by self-identification, yes. I call her 'she' out of courtesy". In a 2021 tweet, he stated "In 2015, Rachel Dolezal, a white chapter president of NAACP, was vilified for identifying as Black. Some men choose to identify as women, and some women choose to identify as men. You will be vilified if you deny that they literally are what they identify as. Discuss". For the latter tweet, his "Humanist of the Year" title was revoked by the American Humanist Association. Robby Soave of Reason magazine criticized the retraction, saying that "The drive to punish dissenters from various orthodoxies is itself illiberal." After receiving criticism for the tweet, Dawkins responded by saying that "I do not intend to disparage trans people. I see that my academic "Discuss" question has been misconstrued as such and I deplore this. It was also not my intent to ally in any way with Republican bigots in US now exploiting this issue."

Dawkins endorsed and recommended The End of Gender: Debunking the Myths about Sex and Identity, a book by Debra Soh which puts forth gender-critical views. In a podcast with Helen Joyce, author of the book Trans: When Ideology Meets Reality, Dawkins said that "sex really is binary" and argued that children are becoming transgender under pressure from their teachers and peers.

In 2024, Dawkins co-authored an op-ed in The Boston Globe with physicist Alan Sokal criticizing the use of the terminology "sex assigned at birth" instead of "sex" by the American Medical Association, the American Psychological Association, the American Academy of Pediatrics, and the Centers for Disease Control and Prevention. Dawkins and Sokal argued that sex is an "objective biological reality" that "is determined at conception and is then observed at birth," rather than assigned by a medical professional. Calling this "social constructionism gone amok," Dawkins and Sokal argued further that "distort[ing] the scientific facts in the service of a social cause" risks undermining trust in medical institutions.

During the 2024 Summer Olympics, Richard Dawkins faced backlash after a tweet in which he falsely referred to two cis-female boxers as "two men, masquerading as women". The statement was widely criticised for being transphobic and contributing to the spread of misinformation. (Both boxers were assigned female at birth and both have always identified as female.)

=== Abortion ===
Dawkins has expressed pro-choice views. Dawkins made a heavily criticized tweet where he stated that it would be immoral not to abort a fetus who had Down syndrome. The Down's Syndrome Association issued a response by saying that "At the Down's syndrome Association, we do not believe Down's syndrome in itself should be a reason for termination, however, we realize that families must make their own choice." Dawkins later apologized.

=== Animal rights ===
Dawkins is a supporter of animal rights. He has stated that he believes many kinds of animals have consciousness. "Consciousness has to be there, hasn't it? It's an evolved, emergent quality of brains. It's very likely that most mammals have consciousness, and probably birds, too." Dawkins has also been a major supporter of the Great Ape Project, a coalition of scientists and others who believe that non-human great apes should have the rights to life, the protection of individual liberty, and the prohibition of torture. Dawkins wrote an essay in The Great Ape Project, a book published by supporters of the project in which they expressed their views, along with Jane Goodall, Jared Diamond, and others. A passage from Dawkins's contribution is as follows:

The word 'apes' usually means chimpanzees, gorillas, orangutans, bonobos, gibbons and siamangs. We admit that we are like apes, but we seldom realise that we are apes. Our common ancestor with the bonobos, chimpanzees and gorillas is much more recent than their common ancestor with the Asian apes — the gibbons and orangutans. There is no natural category that includes chimpanzees, gorillas and orangutans but excludes humans.

=== Child sexual abuse ===
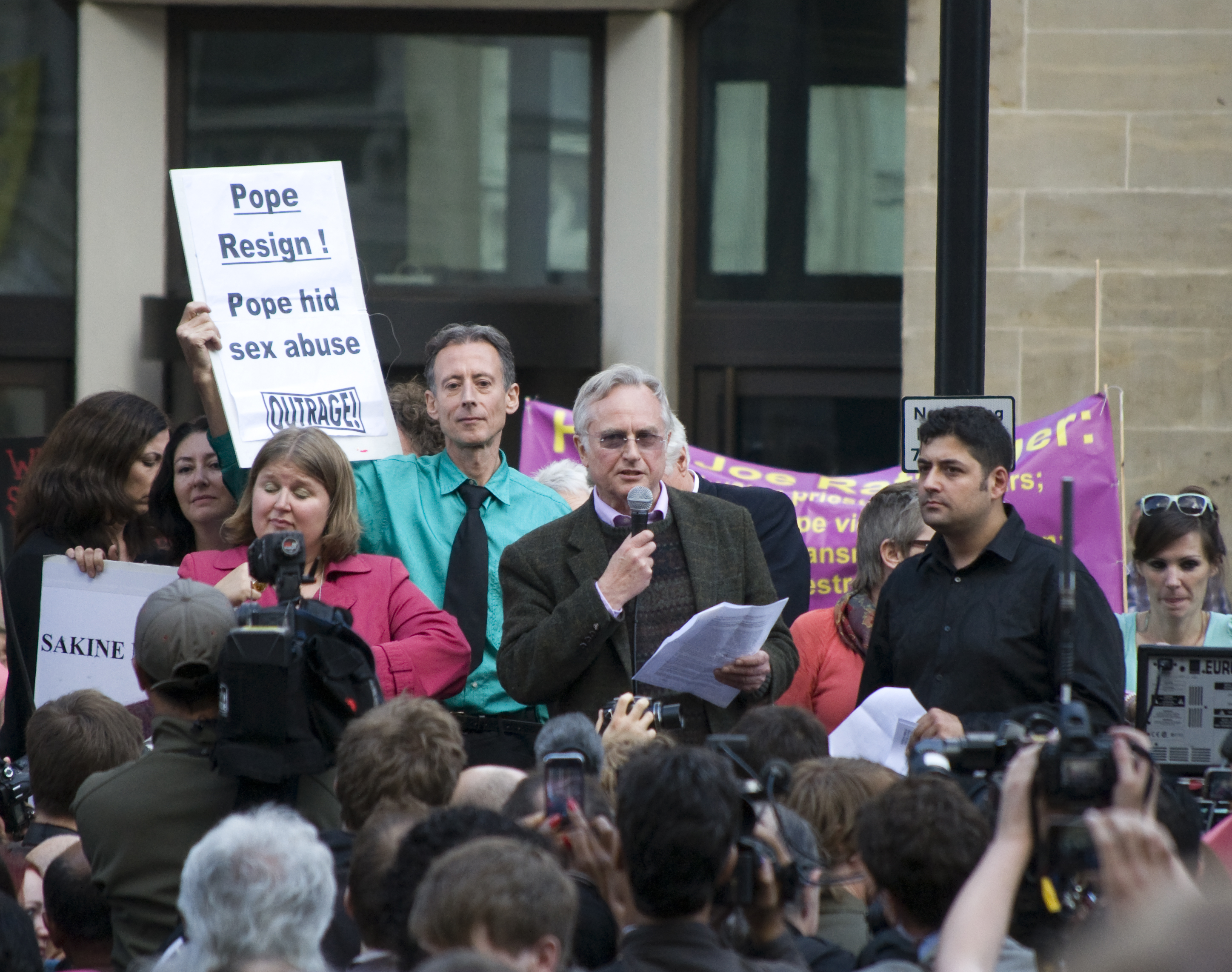
Maryam Namazie, Peter Tatchell and Richard Dawkins protesting against Pope Benedict XVI's visit to the United Kingdom

In 2010, the Associated Press released a letter sent by Cardinal Ratzinger in 1985 to laicize Father Stephen Kiesle, a priest in Oakland, California. Christopher Hitchens and Richard Dawkins in 2010 publicly called for Ratzinger (then Pope Benedict XVI) to stand trial for failure to report suspected sex crimes to the police. Dawkins put £10,000 towards a fund that helped publish Geoffrey Robertson's 2010 book The Case of the Pope: Vatican accountability for human rights abuse which argues that Ratzinger maintained a policy of swearing sex abuse victims to secrecy and moving abusers between parishes until 2002, and that the Vatican is not a sovereign state and the pope is not immune to prosecution.

Dawkins suffered what he describes as "thirty seconds" of a "mild feeling-up" by a school teacher when he was "about nine or ten years old". In the 2006 book The God Delusion, he discussed the Roman Catholic Church sexual abuse scandal in Ireland, and noted an anecdote from an American woman brought up Catholic that the fear of burning in hell was, in her recollection, greater than the psychological effects of molestation by a priest. Mehdi Hasan criticised his use of anecdotal evidence for the controversial claim in a 2012 Al Jazeera English interview.

In the 2013 book An Appetite for Wonder he penned a paragraph on his recollection of being molested by a teacher, telling friends who the same thing had happened to, and the teacher's suicide. He expressed that public responses to paedophilia in schools had changed between when he was a child and in 2013, due to public attention given to British child abuse scandals. He argued that the sexual abuse he had received was "mild" and that he would not judge his teacher by the "standards of today". Dawkins was heavily criticised for those remarks. Dawkins expressed publicly that views in his own autobiography were intended as a reflection of his feelings about his own experiences, and that his comments in his autobiography were not intended to minimise the suffering of other people, and apologised for them. The comments generated controversy, with Peter Watt, the director of child protection at the National Society for the Prevention of Cruelty to Children, responded by saying that "Mr. Dawkins seems to think that because a crime was committed a long time ago we should judge it in a different way. But we know that the victims of sexual abuse suffer the same effects whether it was 50 years ago or today."

== Views on religion ==
Dawkins is a noted critic of religion, atheist, anti-theist, anti-religionist and a secular humanist. Dawkins believes that there is a conflict between science and religion and that science prevails in the debate. Dawkins also thinks that parents forcing their religion on children is a form of mental child abuse and that religion in general is a form of cultural virus.

Dawkins advocates for what he calls "militant atheism" and believes that atheists should not hide their identities so that they can be better integrated into politics and society. Dawkins has written several books criticizing religion, most notably The God Delusion (2006). Dawkins has written that some of his main points in The God Delusion were that atheists can be happy and moral and that they should not be apologetic about their religious identities.

=== Christianity ===
Dawkins has repeatedly criticized Christianity, believing that it has been a negative force throughout history. While he has praised the life of Jesus, he has been critical of the supernatural portions of Christianity and the effect it has on the world. Dawkins has argued that Jesus was a theist because everybody in his time was, and that his ethics should be separated from his theology. "I think we owe Jesus the honour of separating his genuinely original and radical ethics from the supernatural nonsense which he inevitably espoused as a man of his time", while also creating a T-shirt that read "Atheists for Jesus". Dawkins has also said that he is a "secular Christian"—in his words, "in the same sense as secular Jews have a feeling for nostalgia and ceremonies."

However, Dawkins, along with his criticism of Christian fundamentalists, has also criticized moderate Christians for fueling extremists by showing exterior niceness.

What I do think about the difference, and let's leave out Muslims specifically, but the difference between moderate religious people and extremist religious people is that although of course it's only a tiny minority of any sect which is ever going to get violent or horrible, there is a sense in which the moderate nice religious people – nice Christians, nice Muslims – make the world safe for extremists. Because the moderates are so nice we all are brought up with the idea that there's something good about religion and faith. That there's something good about bringing children up to have faith.

=== Islam ===
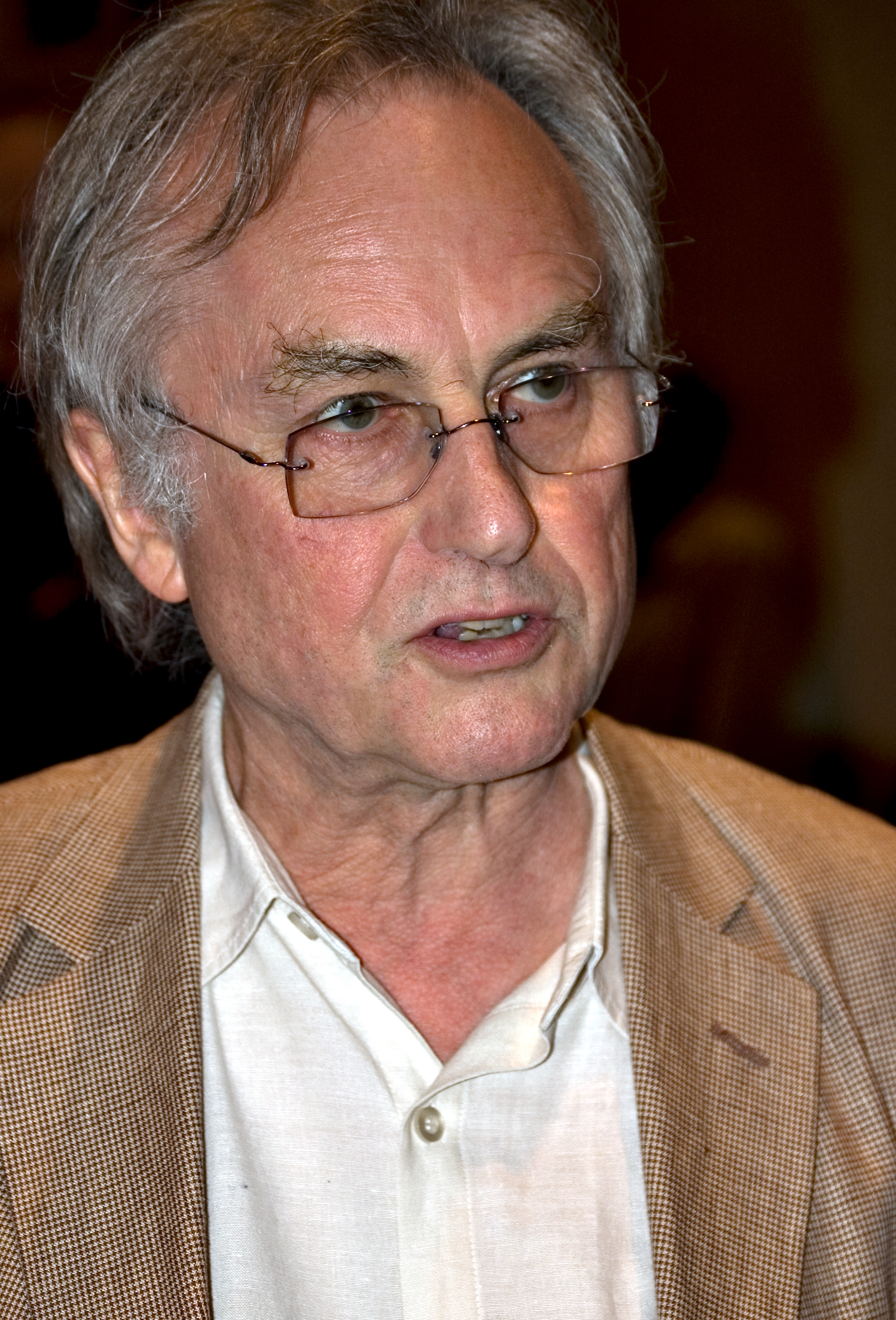
Richard Dawkins at the 35th American Atheists conference (2009)

Dawkins has also been critical of extreme Islam, while also indicating he has no great issue with the adherents of moderate Islam. Due to his views on Islamic extremism, Dawkins declared that "Islam is the greatest force for evil in the world today". In response, some commentators have accused Dawkins of Islamophobia.

Dawkins has criticized unscientific concepts in Islamic beliefs.

It's tempting to say all religions are bad, and I do say all religions are bad, but it's a worse temptation to say all religions are equally bad because they're not. If you look at the actual impact that different religions have on the world it's quite apparent that at present the most evil religion in the world has to be Islam. It's terribly important to modify that because of course that doesn't mean all Muslims are evil, very far from it. Individual Muslims suffer more from Islam than anyone else. They suffer from the homophobia, the misogyny, the joylessness which is preached by extreme Islam, Isis and the Iranian regime. So it is a major evil in the world, we do have to combat it, but we don't do what Trump did and say all Muslims should be shut out of the country. That's draconian, that's illiberal, inhumane and wicked. I am against Islam not least because of the unpleasant effects it has on the lives of Muslims.

In July 2017, Berkeley radio station KPFA cancelled a scheduled book event with Dawkins, after listeners called to complain about such comments, citing a 2013 tweet in which he called Islam "the greatest force for evil in the world today". Dawkins called the cancellation "truly astonishing", stating he had "never used abusive speech against Islam", but had criticized the "oppressive cruelties of Islamism". KPFA has since invited Dawkins to discuss his views on KPFA's airwaves.

Dawkins said that Islam is not the main problem behind the actions of ISIS: "Religion itself is not responsible for this ... It's also this feeling of political involvement." Dawkins has also described Islam as more problematic than Christianity:

There is a belief that every word of the Koran is literally true, and there's a kind of close-mindedness which is, I think, less present in the former Christendom ... There are people in the Islamic world who simply say, 'Islam is right, and we are going to impose our will.' There's an asymmetry ... I think that it's possible to be naively optimistic, and if you reach out to people who have absolutely no intention of reaching back to you, then you may be disillusioned."

Dawkins responds to his critics at the 2017 International Conference on Free Expression and Conscience.

Dawkins has generated controversy on Twitter when he wrote, "All the world's Muslims have fewer Nobel Prizes than Trinity College, Cambridge. They did great things in the Middle Ages, though." After receiving criticism for that, he tweeted in response, "Something you can convert to is not a race. A statement of simple fact is not bigotry. And science by Muslims was great in the distant past. Interesting concept: a simple statement of undeniable FACT can be offensive. Other examples where facts should be hidden because offensive?" Earlier that year, he also wrote, "Of course you can have an opinion about Islam without having read Qur'an. You don't have to read Mein Kampf to have an opinion about Nazism." Among the critics of these comments were Channel 4 economics editor Faisal Islam, who said, "I thought scientists were meant to upbraid journalists for use of spurious data points to 'prove' existing prejudgements," and columnist Tom Chivers in The Daily Telegraph. Dawkins has responded at length to the most common criticisms he has received in a post titled "Calm reflections after a storm in a teacup".

Dawkins has criticised the term Islamophobia. In 2015, along with the National Secular Society, he expressed opposition to a proposal by then Labour Party leader Ed Miliband to make Islamophobia an "aggravated crime." Dawkins stated that the proposed law was too vague, put religion above scrutiny and questioned if it hypothetically could be used to prosecute Charlie Hebdo or if he could be jailed for quoting violent passages from Islamic scripture on Twitter.

Dawkins also commented on the short film Fitna produced by Geert Wilders, a film that argues that Islam promotes violence among its followers. Fitna caused an international uproar. Dawkins wrote that while Geert has done things that "justify epithets such as 'disgusting', or 'racist,' as far as this film is concerned, I can see nothing in it to substantiate such extreme vilification ... Geert Wilders, if it should turn out that you are a racist or a gratuitous stirrer and provocateur I withdraw my respect, but on the strength of Fitna alone I salute you as a man of courage, who has the balls to stand up to a monstrous enemy."

== Political views ==
=== War on Terror and terrorism ===
Dawkins was opposed to the Iraq War. "Well what I really objected to was the lying about the motives for going into Iraq ... it was an act of political opportunism." However, Dawkins supported the Afghan War. "I felt that America needed to try and find those responsible [for 9/11], and it did really appear as though Al-Qaeda was being actively encouraged by the Taliban regime in Afghanistan."

Dawkins held Islamic doctrine responsible for the Charlie Hebdo shooting. His comments resulted in criticisms from several publications, including Al Jazeera, The Guardian, and Salon, deriding him as Islamophobic.

=== Stem cell research ===
In the stem cell controversy, Dawkins favors stem cell research, even if it involves human embryos. "The 'embryos' used for stem cell research are no bigger than a pinhead, and completely lacking in sentience of any kind." He called out what he believed was "the illogical and hypocritical inconsistency between [George W.] Bush's stance on embryonic stem cell research on the one hand, and on slaughtered and maimed Iraqis and Lebanese on the other."

=== Government ===
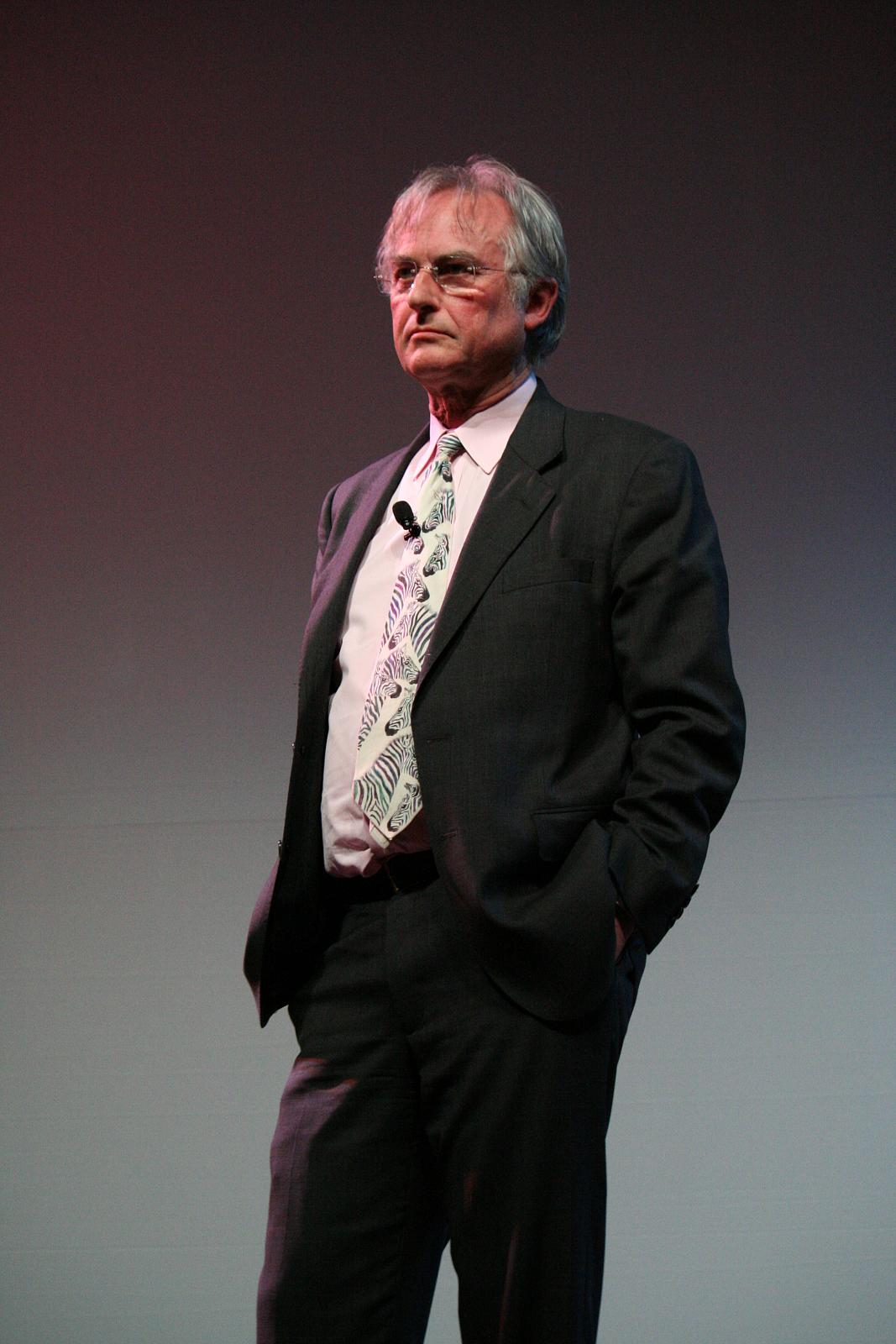
Dawkins at the University of Texas at Austin in 2008

==== UK government ====
Dawkins was highly critical of the UK government under former Prime Minister David Cameron. In an issue of New Statesman, Dawkins heavily criticized Cameron for what he saw as Cameron promoting religion, and specifically Christianity, in the UK and particularly denounced government-supported faith schools.

A depressingly large number of intelligent and educated people [...] still vaguely presume without thinking about it that religious faith is somehow 'good' for other people, good for society, good for public order, good for instilling morals, good for the common people even if we chaps don't need it. Condescending? Patronising? Yes, but isn't that largely what lies behind successive governments' enthusiasm for faith schools?

On Scottish independence, Dawkins joined more than 200 celebrities, including Helena Bonham Carter, Judi Dench, Stephen Hawking, and Andrew Lloyd Webber, in signing an open letter stating, "We want to let you know how very much we value our bonds of citizenship with you, and to express our hope that you will vote to renew them. What unites us is much greater than what divides us. Let's stay together," urging the Scottish people to vote "no" on the 2014 referendum on the issue. After the Brexit referendum, he tweeted "But if I were Scottish today I'd want to leave the nasty little backwater that England is becoming".

Dawkins was opposed to the UK European Union membership referendum 2016 and criticised David Cameron for calling it.

==== United States government ====
Dawkins was very critical of the United States government under George W. Bush, especially his Iraq War decisions. He criticized Bush by stating that "George W. Bush says that God told him to invade Iraq (a pity God didn't vouchsafe him a revelation that there were no weapons of mass destruction)." Dawkins has also said that he thinks American politicians should pay more attention to America's secular crowd. "I think that may be a lesson politicians need to learn, that they don't only need to suck up to the Catholic lobby and the Jewish lobby and Islam, that lobby. Maybe the nonbelievers lobby is a lot more powerful than they realize." Also, Dawkins thinks that U.S. politicians should not invoke religion in their policies. "Politicians shouldn't be promoting religion as part of their government legislation." Dawkins has also expressed his belief that Bush was not actually elected in the controversial 2000 U.S. presidential election through an editorial in The Guardian:

September 11 was your golden Pearl Harbor. This was how you'd get elected in 2004 (not re-elected, elected). You would announce a War on Terror. American troops would win. And you would be the victorious warlord, swaggering in a flight suit before a Mission Accomplished banner. It worked in Afghanistan. But then those puppeteers moved on to their long-term project: Iraq.

Dawkins was a harsh critic of President Donald Trump. After Trump won the 2016 presidential election, Dawkins described him as "an unqualified, narcissistic, misogynistic sick joke".

=== Israeli–Palestinian conflict ===
Dawkins has stated that he is "on the fence" about the Israeli–Palestinian conflict, and has stated on Twitter that "It is reasonable to deplore both the original foundation of the Jewish State of Israel & aspirations now to destroy it." Dawkins said that "can you explain why Palestinian Arabs should be the ones to pay for Hitler's crimes? You surely aren't going to stoop to some kind of biblical justification for picking on that land rather than, say, Bavaria or Madagascar?" Dawkins also expressed anger over Israeli actions during the 2014 Israel–Gaza conflict. He tweeted, "The extent of the destruction in Gaza is obscene. Poor people. Poor people who have lost their homes, their relatives, everything." After the 2023 Hamas-led attack on Israel, Dawkins said: "I have the impression that the motivation for the Palestinians is possibly not entirely about worrying about loss of land but also frank old fashioned antisemitism rather like the nazis." He also wrote on his Twitter account: "Whatever your historically based political sympathies, if you have even a shred of human decency you surely cannot morally justify Saturday's barbaric attacks on innocent civilians (referring to the October 7 attack). 'A plague o’ both your houses' is, for once, inappropriate."

== Scientific views ==
=== Climate change ===
Dawkins accepts that climate change is a major problem facing the world currently. He supported an initiative in which 56 newspapers from 47 countries simultaneously published a joint editorial expressing their views on climate change in order to promote awareness of the problem. He wrote, "[w]hatever you think about global warming and whether humans are responsible, I think we have to salute this remarkable feat of international cooperation." Dawkins has also stated that he accepts that global warming is a threat to the human species. Dawkins has also commended Al Gore's documentary An Inconvenient Truth and in response to the question "Is global warming a threat to the human species?" has replied: "Yes. You could say that the human species is a threat to the human species. I recommend Al Gore's film on global warming. See it and weep. Not just for the human species. Weep for what we could have had in 2000, but for the vote-rigging in Jeb Bush's Florida."

=== Covid-19 ===
On Twitter, Dawkins was a vocal proponent of COVID-19 vaccination and a critic of anti-vaccination sentiment. Dawkins has called the unprecedented speed of COVID-19 vaccine production and the sequencing of the SARS-CoV-2 virus genome "a glory of science".
