= Rebecca Watson =

American blogger (born 1980)

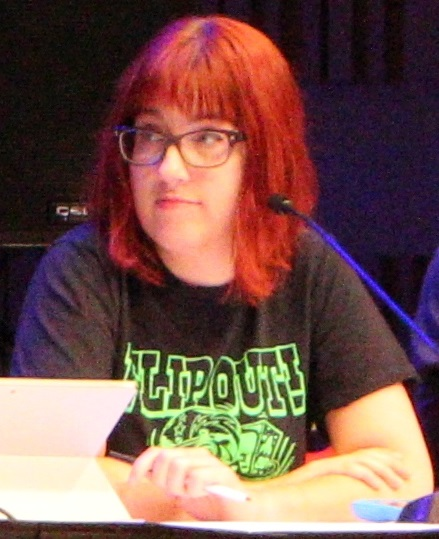
- Watson in 2014
- Born: Rebecca Watson; October 18, 1980 (age 46); United States
- Education: Boston University
- Years active: 2005–present
- Known for: Science communication, atheism, feminism

YouTube information
- Channel: Rebecca Watson
- Years active: 2006–present
- Subscribers: 263 thousand
- Views: 42.0 million
- Last updated: April 23, 2026
- Website: skepchick.org

Rebecca Watson (born October 18, 1980) is an American atheist blogger, vlogger, and YouTuber. She is the founder of the blog Skepchick and former co-host of The Skeptics' Guide to the Universe podcast.

== Early life and education ==
Watson grew up in New Jersey.

She says she had little interest in science before meeting other skeptics, including magician James Randi, while at university. Watson attended Boston University while also working as a magician.

She graduated in 2002 with a degree in communications.

== Career ==
Watson blogs about atheism and feminist politics, and has been particularly active in critiquing the modern atheist movement (sometimes called "New Atheism") from within, especially regarding the lack of attention given to the role of women in the movement. Primarily active online, she has been described by BuzzFeed as "the first major atheist whose rise has occurred on the web".

=== Skepchick ===
After attending James Randi's skeptic conference The Amaz!ng Meeting, Watson produced a pin-up calendar to support the cost for other women to attend the conference. She founded the website Skepchick in 2005 as a place to distribute the calendars. New editions of the calendar featuring scientists and skeptics were produced each year until 2007.

The website originally consisted of a forum and a monthly e-zine, Skepchick Magazine, launched in 2006. The same year, Watson created a blog that would eventually replace the magazine. Skepchick's stated goal is to "discuss women's issues from a skeptical standpoint". The site has a focus on science and skepticism in general rather than atheism in particular. Watson has also contributed articles on skepticism to the blog Bostonist.

In 2010, Skepchick partnered with the Women Thinking Free Foundation to host a vaccination drive with the help of the "Hug Me!" campaign at the Dragon*Con convention in Atlanta, Georgia. Public health staff provided Tdap vaccinations free of charge, as well as educational literature promoting immunization. In 2011, Skepchick, the James Randi Educational Foundation (JREF), and the Women Thinking Free Foundation partnered to offer a similar vaccination clinic at The Amaz!ng Meeting 9 in Las Vegas.

Skepchick won an Ockham Award in 2012 for Best Skeptic Blog. In 2017, the site consisted of a network of over 20 bloggers from around the world. In 2023, Watson formally closed the blog network after most writers had moved on to other projects.

=== The Skeptics' Guide to the Universe ===
Watson regularly appeared on the Skeptics' Guide to the Universe, co-hosting the podcast for nine years. Her first appearance was on episode 33 in March 2006, where she was interviewed about her work on Skepchick. She returned for episode 36 as a regular member of the panel. In December 2014, she announced that she had recorded her final show prior to leaving the organization.

=== Public Radio Talent Quest ===
In May 2007, Watson entered the Public Radio Talent Quest, a contest aimed to find new public radio hosts. Watson's entries won the popular vote in every round, and she was selected along with two other winners to produce a pilot episode for presentation to executives of the Corporation for Public Broadcasting.

Watson's pilot, Curiosity, Aroused, was an hour-long program focused on science and skepticism. It featured interviews with Richard Saunders of Australian Skeptics and Mystery Investigators, and Richard Wiseman, author of the book Quirkology and Professor of the Public Understanding of Psychology at the University of Hertfordshire. She also investigated claims of poisonous amounts of lead in lipstick, went on a ghost tour, and visited a psychic fair. Her show was the only one among the three winners not to be awarded funds for production of a year-long radio program.

=== "Elevatorgate" ===
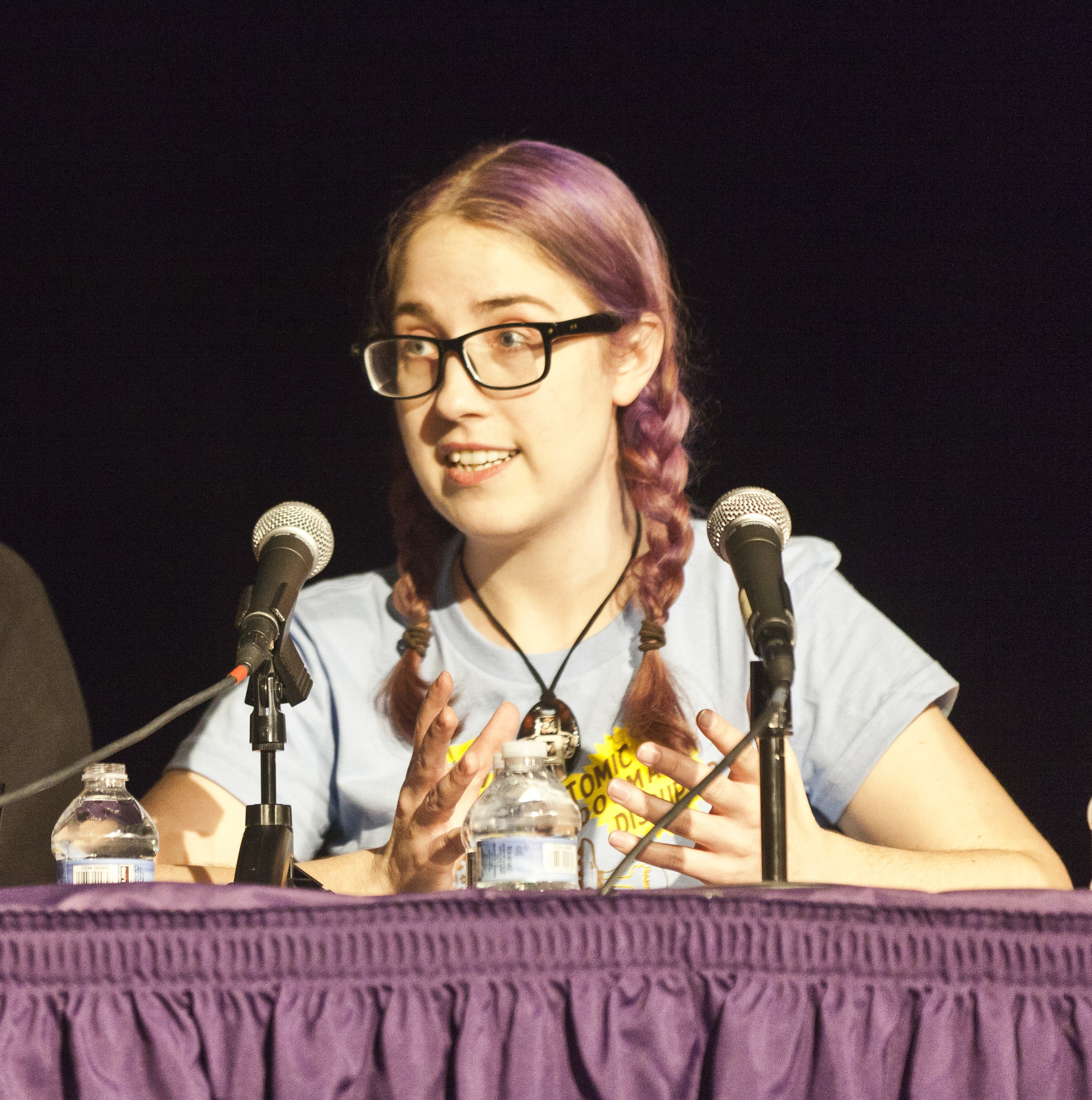
Watson speaking at NECSS 2011

In 2011, Watson spoke on a panel at the World Atheist Convention about many women's feelings of sexual objectification at atheist conferences. Following the convention, Watson published a video blog criticizing sexism within the atheist movement, in which she described being sexually propositioned in an elevator by a male conference attendee. Watson described socializing with other attendees at a hotel bar until 4:00 a.m., then announcing she was tired and going to bed. After this, a man from the group followed her into an elevator and invited her to his room for coffee, which she declined. Watson drew a parallel between the incident and her conference talk on sexual objectification the night before, saying, "Guys, don't do that". She went on to say:

I was a single woman, in a foreign country, at 4 a.m., in a hotel elevator with you—just you—and don't invite me back to your hotel room, right after I have finished talking about how it creeps me out and makes me uncomfortable when men sexualize me in that manner.

Watson further commented that fears of sexual harassment might be keeping women away from atheist meetings. Despite the incident being a minor topic of the video, it was followed by a campaign of misogynistic harassment against Watson that came to be known as "Elevatorgate". Reactions to the video varied, with some supporting Watson's desire for privacy and others accusing Watson of exaggerating the problem and scaring women away from conferences. However, she was supported by many bloggers on the FreethoughtBlogs network founded by writer and biologist PZ Myers, who wrote a supportive post about the incident on his blog Pharyngula.

The controversy attracted mainstream media attention when biologist Richard Dawkins joined the discussion on Myers's blog, sarcastically comparing Watson's experience to that of an imaginary Muslim woman. Although Watson had not mentioned sexism against women in Islam, Dawkins' comment mocked the supposed indifference of Western feminists to the plight of oppressed women in Muslim-majority countries, telling "Muslima" to "stop whining" in the face of female genital mutilation, intimate partner violence, and the threat of death by stoning and to "grow up, or at least grow a thicker skin".

The result of this exchange led to an extended internet flame war nicknamed "Elevatorgate" that has been the subject of Internet memes. A negative response by the online atheist community to Watson's account of the incident soon spread across several websites, including Reddit, and became highly polarized and heated. The debate steadily grew to include the overall status of women within the secular movement, with most of the movements's prominent figures offering their opinion on whether the elevator incident constituted sexual harassment. The discussion spurred a continued backlash, with commenters online labeling women who spoke up on the subject as "feminazis" and other misogynistic slurs. Watson experienced a campaign of misogynistic harassment, including threats of rape and murder, with one man publishing a website threatening to kill her.

Dawkins' comments led him to be accused of misogyny and Islamophobia. He later explained that he thought Watson had not had any reason to feel threatened, comparing Watson's experience to riding in an elevator with someone chewing gum. Several commentators argued that the incident showed Dawkins' insensitivity to gender-related issues such as sexual violence. Religious scholar Stephen LeDrew writes that "For the first time since the New Atheism had risen to prominence, [Dawkins] found himself under attack by many of those who had viewed him as a respected leader". David Allen Green criticized Dawkins for dismissing lesser wrongs because bigger wrongs exist. Watson stated that she would no longer buy or endorse Dawkins' books, saying, "to have my concerns—and more so the concerns of other women who have survived rape and sexual assault—dismissed thanks to a rich white man comparing them to the plight of women who have been mutilated, is insulting to all of us".

Religious studies scholars Steven Tomlins and Lori G. Beaman argue that the incident highlights a schism over the role of feminism in the atheist movement, with some saying it should take a prominent place in the movement and others calling it divisive. In the wake of this and an incident at a Center for Inquiry–sponsored event, where female atheists reported gender bias and inappropriate behavior, organizations—including the Richard Dawkins Foundation—have reviewed their policies regarding sexual harassment and non-discrimination. Dawkins later apologized, stating, "There should be no rivalry in victimhood, and I'm sorry I once said something similar to American women complaining of harassment, inviting them to contemplate the suffering of Muslim women by comparison", but then he insisted in the comparison, insinuating that the others are belittling: "If we wish to insist that all examples of a sexual crime are exactly equally bad, perhaps we need to look more carefully at exactly who is belittling what." Watson tweeted in response, "Richard Dawkins just did the blog-equivalent of coughing into his hand while mumbling 'sorry' to me. Eh, I'll take it."

== Personal life ==
Watson married her fiancé in a surprise ceremony during The Amaz!ng Meeting in July 2009. In April 2011, she announced that she and her husband were separated and seeking a divorce.

Watson has stated that she has prosopagnosia, an impaired ability to recognize faces.

== Honors ==
An outer main-belt asteroid discovered by David H. Healy on March 22, 2001, was named 153289 Rebeccawatson in her honor.

== See also ==
- Greta Christina – American atheist blogger, speaker, and author
- Gamergate (harassment campaign) – Misogynistic online harassment campaign
- Views of Richard Dawkins § Elevatorgate
