= Nick Cohen =

British journalist

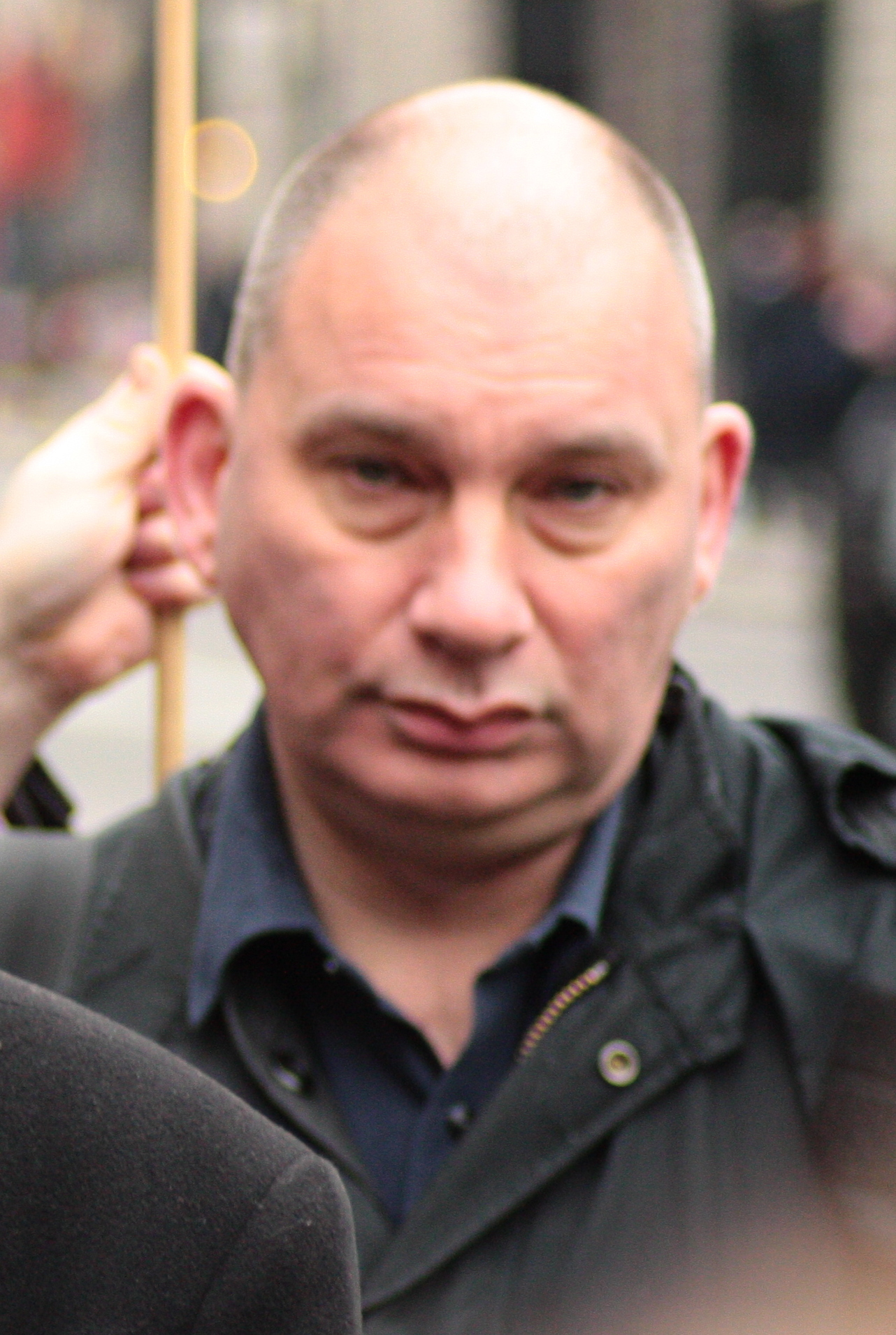
- Cohen in 2010
- Born: Nicholas Cohen; 1961 (age 64–65); Stockport, Cheshire, England
- Occupations: Journalist; author; political commentator
- Children: 1

Nicholas Cohen (born 1961) is a British journalist, author, and political commentator. He was previously a columnist for The Observer and is currently one for The Spectator. Following accusations of sexual harassment, he left The Observer in 2022 and began publishing an online newsletter.

== Early life ==
Cohen was born in Stockport, Cheshire, England, and raised in Manchester. His father was Jewish. He was educated at Altrincham Grammar School for Boys and Hertford College, Oxford, where he read Philosophy, politics and economics (PPE).

== Career ==
Cohen began his career at the Sutton Coldfield News, before moving to the Birmingham Post, later becoming a contributor to The Independent and The Observer in 1996.

Cohen was a columnist for The Observer and a regular contributor to The Spectator. He has also written for Time, the Independent on Sunday, the London Review of Books, the London Evening Standard, the New Statesman and The New European.

In August 2022, Press Gazette reported that Cohen's regular Observer column had been "paused", pending an investigation by the newspaper's publisher, Guardian News and Media (GNM). The Gazette also reported that allegations against Cohen had been made public by the barrister Jolyon Maugham, and that a direct complaint had been made by the journalist Lucy Siegle, which she accused GNM of mishandling. Writing in The New European, Siegle detailed her alleged sexual harassment by Cohen in the Observer offices some years before, along with her experience of making a complaint in 2018, stating that GNM executives failed to offer a formal investigation.

Cohen's last column for The Observer was published in July 2022; in January 2023, he began publishing his own newsletter. That month, the Press Gazette reported that he left after "an investigation over a number of complaints about Cohen's behaviour in the office made by former female colleagues", but said he had resigned from The Observer on "health grounds". In May 2023, Jane Bradley reported in The New York Times that in addition to Siegle, several other women had come forward with accusations of sexual misconduct against Cohen, and that the British media had failed to cover the story. Furthermore, Bradley revealed that Madison Marriage of the Financial Times actually had the story earlier, but was stopped from making it public by FT editor Roula Khalaf.

== Views ==
=== Domestic ===
In August 2014, Cohen was one of 200 public figures who were signatories to a letter to The Guardian opposing Scottish independence in the run-up to September's referendum on that issue.

In 2014, he spoke out against the UK Independence Party and its leader, Nigel Farage, in The Observer, for which he received the Commentator Award by the European Press Prize a year later.

=== Foreign policy ===
The Independent wrote that Cohen was "one of a number of prominent left-leaning journalists whose support for the ousting of Saddam Hussein has led them into questioning pretty much everything that the liberal left has ever espoused ... [He] believes with passion that the one thing international leftists should stand against is totalitarianism, and [that] the left has always been at its most morally bankrupt at the times when it either simply omits to do this, or even more appallingly embraces totalitarian mindsets itself."

The Isis Magazine said that Cohen "began his career as an avowed left-winger, but his support for the Iraq war set him at odds with the majority of the left wing. His ideology has, over the last decade, been defined by his opposition to what he feels to be the decline of the Western left: where before it espoused solidarity, now it is relativist and anti-internationalist."

Cohen was for many years a critic of Tony Blair's foreign policy. He began modifying his views after 2001, advocating support for the 2003 invasion of Iraq, and becoming a critic of the Stop the War Coalition. He supported the NATO-led intervention in Libya to oust former Libyan leader Muammar Gaddafi in 2011. In 2012, he called for Western military intervention in the Syrian Civil War.

In 2006, he was a leading signatory to the Euston Manifesto, which proposed what it termed "a new political alignment", in which the left would take a stronger stance in favour of military intervention and against what the signatories deemed to be anti-American attitudes.

== Works ==
He has written five books: Cruel Britannia: Reports on the Sinister and the Preposterous (1999), a collection of his journalism; Pretty Straight Guys (2003), a highly critical account of the New Labour project; What's Left? (2007), a critique of the contemporary liberal left, which was shortlisted for the Orwell Prize; Waiting for the Etonians: Reports from the Sickbed of Liberal England (2009); and You Can't Read this Book (2012), which deals with censorship.

- Cohen, Nick (2000). Cruel Britannia: Reports on the Sinister and the Preposterous. Verso Books. ISBN 1-85984-288-7
- Cohen, Nick (2003). Pretty Straight Guys. Faber and Faber: paperback edition. ISBN 0-571-22004-5
- Cohen, Nick (2007). What's Left? How Liberals Lost Their Way. Fourth Estate. ISBN 0-00-722969-0
- Cohen, Nick (2009). Waiting for the Etonians: Reports from the Sickbed of Liberal England. Fourth Estate. ISBN 0-00-730892-2
- Cohen, Nick (2012). You Can't Read This Book: Censorship in an Age of Freedom. Fourth Estate. ISBN 978-0007308903

== Personal life ==
Cohen lives in Islington with his wife and their son. He is an atheist but has said that he is becoming "more Jewish".
