= You Can't Read this Book =

Book by Nick Cohen

You Can't Read This Book
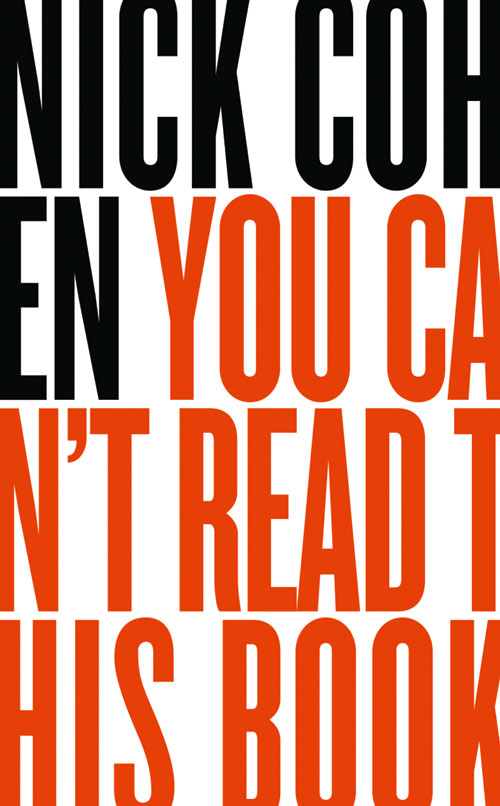
- Book cover 2012
- Author: Nick Cohen
- Language: English
- Genre: Current affairs, polemic
- Publisher: Fourth Estate (HarperCollins)
- Publication date: 19 January 2012 ppb 2013
- Publication place: United Kingdom
- Media type: Print (hardcover and paperback); E-book
- Pages: 330 (first edition, hardback)
- ISBN: 978-0007308903
- OCLC: 751860962

You Can't Read This Book: Censorship in an Age of Freedom (2012) is a book by Nick Cohen about modern censorship, plutocratic power and privacy laws, freedom of speech, and free expression.

Cohen argues that unrestricted access to online information and social media may expedite the fall of dictators, but does not mean we live in an unprecedented era of freedom. He states we are subject to ever-tightening structures on what we say, think or do. According to Cohen, privacy laws let the wealthy censor the press; protest against oppression is slammed as bigotry and voices of dissent can't be heard over "the clamour hailing the internet as the saviour of democracy." While we seem more informed than ever before, states Cohen, his book aims to show that if we want to preserve free speech, we ignore history at our peril.

== Reviews ==
The book's epigraph is from Christopher Hitchens, to whom the book is also dedicated:

There is an all-out confrontation between the ironic and the literal mind: between every kind of commissar and inquisitor and bureaucrat and those who know that, whatever the role of social and political forces, idea and books have to be formulated and written by individuals.

— Christopher Hitchens

The terror of knowing certain truths, and the desire for ignorance, is a central human passion, writes Hanif Kureishi in his review of Cohen's book: "people don't want to hear themselves, let alone anyone else. The truth can be so disconcerting that any lie is preferable. Therefore the possibility of another view of things is ruled out by political systems, corporations, authorities, bankers, parents and powermongers of all types."

Robert Bradley wrote, in the Huffington Post, that the most interesting point is that "the moment you enter your place of work, you no longer reside within a governed democracy, but instead are enslaved to a systematic dictatorship that tells you when to eat, where to piss and what clothes to wear. Woe betide if you dare blow the whistle on their 'business practices'! The secret police faction, known lovingly as 'Human Resources', will have you bagged, sacked and broke quicker than the overweight security guard can throw your 'unorthodox ass' out of the building!" Beginning with the case of Ayaan Hirsi Ali, Cohen presents an overview of censorship issues, commenting on numerous important incidents: the Danish cartoons; Simon Singh; Julian Assange; the libel laws, as well as new forms of ingenuity, when it comes to truth-telling, such as Twitter. Hanif Kureishi writes that the "arguments Cohen describes so vividly are necessary and important to hear, as is the fact that the tension between suppression and freedom will never end. It is not as if one day everything will be settled. What is crucial is that the quarrel is not closed; and to see that closing quarrels is what lifeless ideologies do: they behave as though only one view of the world was possible, as if it was credible to kill the imagination, and that other versions of reality are inconceivable."

== See also ==
- Academic freedom
- Freedom of the press
