= Christian atheism =

Form of Christianity rejecting God

Christian atheism embraces the teachings, narratives, symbols, practices, or communities associated with Christianity without accepting the existence of a deity. It is a form of nontheism and often overlaps with post-theism.

== Common beliefs ==
There are different schools of thought among Christian atheists. Thomas Ogletree, Frederick Marquand Professor of Ethics and Religious Studies at Yale Divinity School, lists these four common beliefs:

1. the assertion of the unreality of God for our age, including the understandings of God that have been a part of traditional Christian theology;
2. the insistence upon coming to grips with contemporary culture as a necessary feature of responsible theological work;
3. varying degrees and forms of alienation from the church as it is now constituted, and;
4. recognition of the centrality of the person of Jesus in theological reflection.

== Theological approaches ==
=== Death of God theology ===
One approach to Christian atheism is Death of God theology, which had brief public prominence in the mid-1960s. The term refers to a range of views aiming to account for the rise of secularity and emphasizing that God has either ceased to exist or never did. According to Paul van Buren, a Death of God theologian, the word God itself is "either meaningless or misleading". Van Buren contended that it is impossible to think about God and said, "We cannot identify anything which will count for or against the truth of our statements concerning 'God'." Most Christian atheists believe that God never existed, but a few take the death of God literally.

Thomas J. J. Altizer spoke of Jesus' death on the cross as a redemptive event that passed the baton to humanity. In The Gospel of Christian Atheism, he stated, "Every man today who is open to experience knows that God is absent, but only the Christian knows that God is dead, that the death of God is a final and irrevocable event and that God's death has actualized in our history a new and liberated humanity."

Some death of God theologians favor separation from the institutions of the Christian Church. Altizer stated that "the radical Christian believes that the ecclesiastical tradition has ceased to be Christian" and indeed that faith "can never identify itself with an ecclesiastical tradition or with a given doctrinal or ritual form." Moreover, he believed orthodox Christianity failed in rejecting modern culture and contemporary theology, and that it should instead seek the sacred by embracing the radical profanity of the modern age. Altizer saw God as the enemy of man because mankind could never reach its fullest potential while God existed – and to cling to God was "to evade the human situation of our century and to renounce the inevitable suffering which is its lot."

=== Postmodern theology ===
Postmodern theology emphasizes that God, or the idea of God, is subject to human interpretation. It is influenced by deconstructionists such as Jacques Derrida, Georg Wilhelm Friedrich Hegel (a German idealist), Christian existentialists including Soren Kierkegaard and Paul Tillich, and philosopher Martin Heidegger. John Caputo, a leading figure in postmodern theology, advocates "weak theology," which denies the existence of a supernatural, powerful God that reigns over the world in favor of a God that represents the call for people to embrace "unconditionals" such as justice, hospitality, and forgiveness. These unconditionals are never fully reachable or even conceivable. Accordingly, Caputo says "God doesn't exist; God insists" and "the existence of our response is the only way the insistence of the call acquires existence or makes an appearance in the world." Caputo, who distances himself from death of God theology, asserts that atheism is the beginning of theology rather than the point of it, as he stresses the role of theopoetics in which people respond to the call of "the name (of) God" through things such as metaphors, narratives, songs, poems, and parables rather than propositions and arguments. Caputo accepts the postmodern label but also uses the terms "radical theology," post-structuralism, and post-theism. He identifies with the Christian left.

In the United Kingdom, Don Cupitt pioneered Christian non-realism, which rejects a "realistic ontology, the notion that there is something out there prior to and independent of our language and theories, and against which they can be checked." Cupitt came to associate with postmodernism over time and advocates for "solar living" that says religion can offer a moral philosophy suited to our times, rooted in both cosmology and secular culture, and, like the sun, "simply is its own outpouring of self-expression."

=== Other theologies ===
Philosopher and cultural theorist Slavoj Žižek says, "The only way to be an atheist is through Christianity." He claims traditional atheism does not go far enough.

Christianity is much more atheist than the usual atheism, which can claim there is no God and so on, but nonetheless retains a certain trust into the Big Other. This Big Other can be called natural necessity, evolution, or whatever. We humans are nonetheless reduced to a position within the harmonious whole of evolution, whatever, but the difficult thing to accept is again that there is no Big Other, no point of reference which guarantees meaning.

According to Žižek, the idea of Jesus' death on the cross addresses this tension by serving as an act of love and a "resolution of radical anxiety." Indeed, Žižek says that Jesus himself became an atheist on the cross when crying out, "My God, my God, why have you forsaken me?" (Mark 15:34)

Theologian Peter Rollins says the distinction between theology and atheism is "artificial," and he extols the "profoundly theological dimensions of atheism and the deeply atheistic dimensions of theology." Rollins says that "when you take Christianity seriously," the belief in a metaphysical God "of necessity goes." Rollins instead advocates pyrotheology.

Pyrotheology involves a deep critique of any religious/ideological system that promises an escape from doubt and anxiety. ... Pyrotheology helps to transform the doubts and difficulties of daily life into a fuel that ignites a journey into the depth and density of life. Pyrotheology offers an incendiary understanding of faith that has nothing to do with the tired debates between theists and atheists. It uncovers how faith helps us resolutely confront our brokenness, joyfully embrace unknowing, and courageously face the difficulties of life.

== Dealing with culture ==
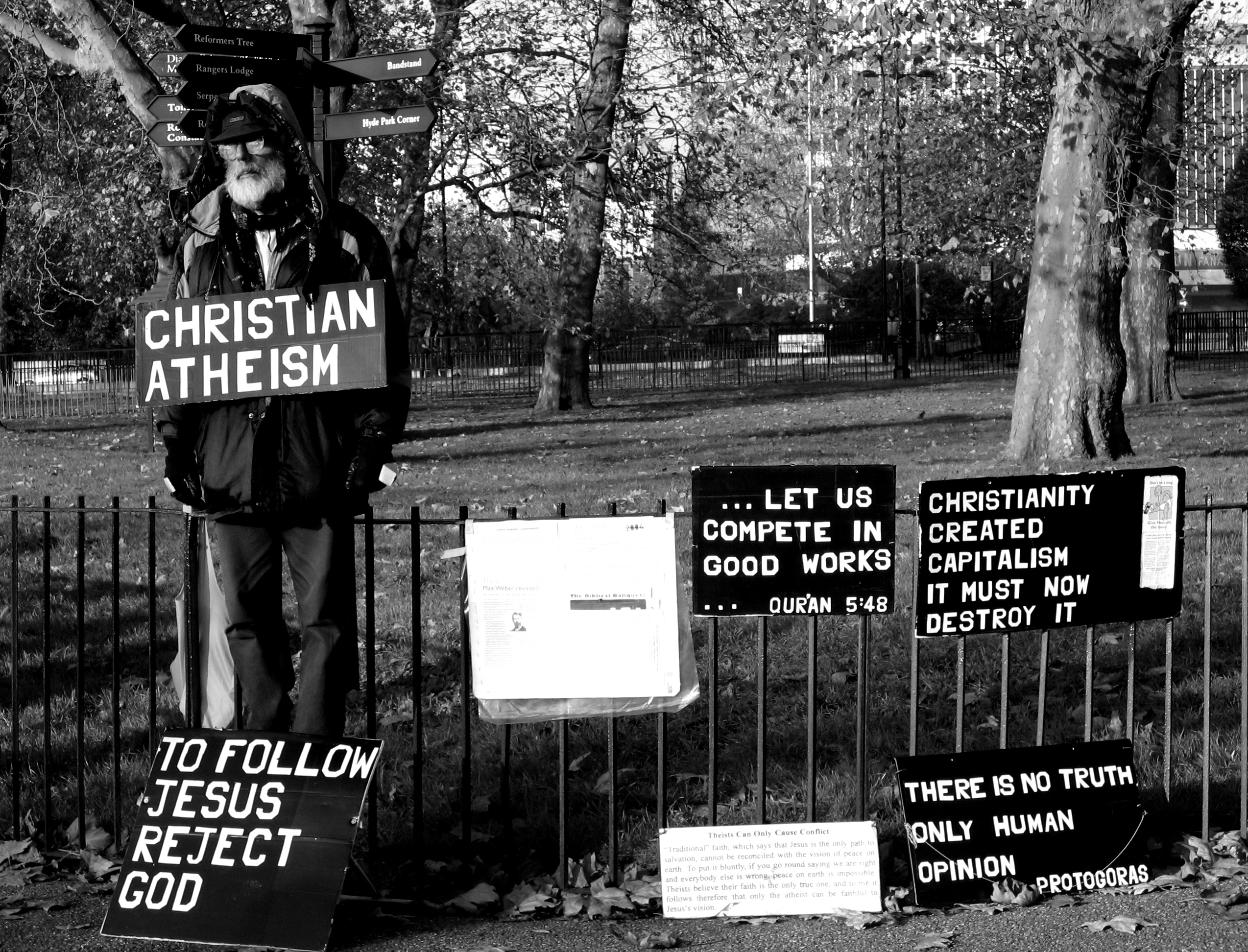
A man promoting Christian atheism at Speakers' Corner in Hyde Park, London, in 2005. One of his placards reads "To follow Jesus, reject God."

Theologians including Altizer and Colin Lyas, a philosophy lecturer at Lancaster University, have written about religion's place in a scientific, empirical culture. In Altizer's words, "[n]o longer can faith and the world exist in mutual isolation ... the radical Christian condemns all forms of faith that are disengaged with the world." He adds that mankind's response to atheism should be one of "acceptance and affirmation". Lyas writes, "Christian atheists are united also in the belief that any satisfactory answer to these problems must be an answer that will make life tolerable in this world, here and now and which will direct attention to the social and other problems of this life."

== Centrality of Jesus ==
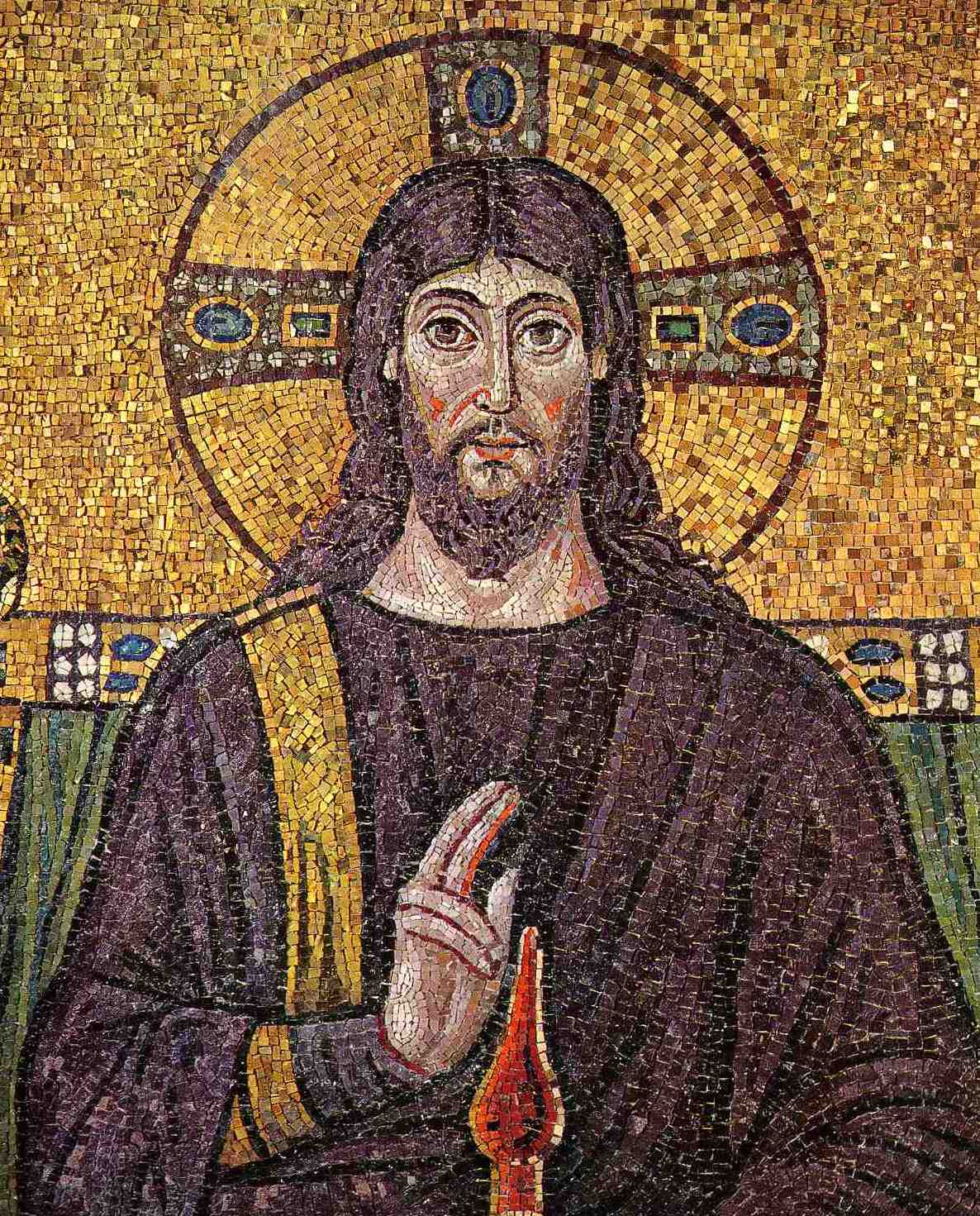
6th-century mosaic of Jesus in Christianity at Basilica of Sant'Apollinare Nuovo in Ravenna, Italy

Although Jesus is still a central feature of Christian atheism, Hamilton said that to the Christian atheist, Jesus as a historical or supernatural figure is not the foundation of faith; instead, Jesus is a "place to be, a standpoint". Some Christian atheists look to Jesus as an example of what a Christian should be, but they do not see him as God, nor as the Son of God—merely as an influential rabbi. Hamilton wrote that following Jesus means being "alongside the neighbor, being for him", and that to follow Jesus means to be human, to help other humans, and to further humankind. Other Christian atheists such as Thomas Altizer preserve the divinity of Jesus, arguing that through him God negates God's transcendence of being.

== By denomination ==
Of Americans who do not believe in God, 5% identified as Catholic, while 9% identified as Protestant and other Christian, according to the 2007 Pew Religious Landscape survey. Of Americans who identify as unaffiliated, including atheists and agnostics, 41% were raised Protestant and 28% were raised Catholic, according to the 2014 Pew Religious Landscape survey.

=== Protestantism ===
In the Netherlands, 42% of the members of the Protestant Church in the Netherlands (PKN) are nontheists. Non-belief among clergymen is not always seen as a problem. Some follow the tradition of "Christian non-realism", most famously expounded in the United Kingdom by Don Cupitt in the 1980s, which holds that God is a symbol or metaphor and that religious language is not matched by a transcendent reality. According to an investigation of 860 pastors in seven Dutch Protestant denominations, 1 in 6 clergy are either agnostic or atheist. In one of those denominations, the Remonstrants, the number of doubters was 42%.

Klaas Hendrikse, a minister within the Protestant Church in the Netherlands (PKN), has stirred controversy by describing God as "a word for experience, or human experience," and suggesting that Jesus may not have existed. Hendrikse attracted attention with his 2007 book Believing in a God Who Does Not Exist: Manifesto of An Atheist Pastor, where he argued that belief in God's existence is not necessary to believe in God. He writes, "For me, God is not a being, but a word for what can happen between people. For example, when someone says to you, 'I will not abandon you,' and then makes those words come true, it would be perfectly acceptable to call that [relationship] God." A General Synod later found that Hendrikse's views were widely shared by clergy and church members. In 2010, a decision to allow Hendrikse to continue his ministry was made after a regional supervisory panel concluded that his statements "are not of sufficient weight to damage the foundations of the Church." The panel also stated that Hendrikse's ideas were theologically consistent with the liberal tradition that is an integral part of the church.

In the United Kingdom, a poll of Anglican clergy found that 2% of priests are atheist, and 16% are "unclear about God". One former Archbishop of Canterbury, the leader of the Church of England, has said he has doubts about his belief in God.

A 2003 Harris Interactive survey found that 90% of self-identified Protestants in the United States believe in God and about 4% believe there is no God. In 2017, the WIN-Gallup International Association (WIN/GIA) poll found that Sweden, a majority Christian country, had second highest percentage (76%) of people who call themselves atheist or irreligious, after China. A substantial portion of Quakers are nontheist Quakers. Among British Quakers, 14.5% identified as atheists and 43% felt "unable to profess belief in God" in 2013.

=== Catholicism ===
Catholic atheists accept the culture, traditions, rituals and norms of Catholicism, but deny the existence of God. Miguel de Unamuno's 1930 novel San Manuel Bueno, Mártir depicts Catholic atheism. According to research in 2007, only 27% of Catholics in the Netherlands considered themselves theist; 55% were ietsist or agnostic deist and 17% were agnostic or atheist. Many Dutch people still affiliate with the term Catholic and use it within certain traditions as a basis of their cultural identity, rather than as a religious identity. As of 2007, the vast majority of the Dutch Catholic population has described itself as either lapsed Catholic or irreligious in practice.

== Criticisms ==
In his book Mere Christianity, the apologist C. S. Lewis objected to Hamilton's version of Christian atheism and the claim that Jesus was merely a moral guide.

I am trying here to prevent anyone saying the really foolish thing that people often say about Him: 'I'm ready to accept Jesus as a great moral teacher, but I don't accept his claim to be God.' That is the one thing we must not say. A man who was merely a man and said the sort of things Jesus said would not be a great moral teacher. He would either be a lunatic—on the level with the man who says he is a poached egg—or else he would be the Devil of Hell. You must make your choice. Either this man was, and is, the Son of God, or else a madman or something worse. You can shut him up for a fool, you can spit at him and kill him as a demon or you can fall at his feet and call him Lord and God, but let us not come with any patronising nonsense about his being a great human teacher. He has not left that open to us. He did not intend to. ... Now it seems to me obvious that He was neither a lunatic nor a fiend: and consequently, however strange or terrifying or unlikely it may seem, I have to accept the view that He was and is God.

Lewis's argument, best known as Lewis's trilemma, has been criticized for constituting a false dilemma, since it does not deal with other options such as Jesus being mistaken, misrepresented, or simply mythical. Bart Ehrman has stated that the historical Jesus never claimed to be God. Philosopher John Beversluis argues that Lewis "deprives his readers of numerous alternate interpretations of Jesus that carry with them no such odious implications".

== Theologians and philosophers ==
- Thomas J. J. Altizer (1927–2018): American theologian noted for his incorporation of death of God theology.
- Marcus Borg (1942–2015): American New Testament scholar, theologian, and leader in progressive Christianity who rejected "supernatural theism" while still embracing God in the form of panentheism.
- William Montgomery Brown (1855–1937): American Episcopal bishop, communist author, and atheist activist.
- John D. Caputo (born 1940): American philosopher and a leading figure in postmodern theology. He writes, "God doesn't exist; God insists."
- John Dominic Crossan (born 1934): Irish-American New Testament scholar and former priest who says he is "absolutely" a Christian while not believing in a literal God.
- Thorkild Grosbøll (1948–2020): Danish Lutheran priest who announced in 2003 that he did not believe in a higher power, in particular a creating or upholding God. He continued to function as a priest until 2008 when he retired.
- Robert M. Price (born 1954): American writer who argues in favor of the Christ myth theory and identifies as a Christian atheist.
- Peter Rollins (born 1973): Northern Irish theologian who advocates "pyrotheology," which posits faith as a way of engaging with the world rather than a set of beliefs.
- George Santayana (1863–1952): Spanish-American philosopher, writer, and novelist. Although a life-long atheist, he held Spanish Catholic culture in deep regard. He would describe himself as an "aesthetic Catholic."
- Frank Schaeffer, son of theologian Francis Schaeffer describes himself as "an atheist who believes in God."
- John Shelby Spong (1931–2021): American Episcopal bishop and theologian who offered "Twelve Theses" to renew Christianity, the first of which is that "[t]heism, as a way of defining God, is dead. So most theological God-talk is today meaningless. A new way to speak of God must be found."
- Paul van Buren (1924–1998): Episcopal priest, theologian, and author associated with Death of God theology.
- Slavoj Žižek (born 1949): Slovenian philosopher who self-identifies as a Christian atheist in the opening line of his book Pandemic!: COVID-19 Shakes the World.

== Other notable people ==
- Alexander Lukashenko (born 1954): president of Belarus, who describes himself as "an Orthodox atheist".
- Luboš Motl (born 1973): Czech theoretical physicist.
- Douglas Murray (born 1979): British author, journalist, and political commentator. He is a former Anglican who believes Christianity to be an important influence on British and European culture.
- Oriana Fallaci (1929-2006): Italian writer, author and journalist, critic of Islam
- Anton Rubinstein (1829–1894): Russian pianist, composer, and conductor. Although he was raised as a Christian, Rubinstein later became a Christian atheist.
- Dan Savage (born 1964): American author, media pundit, journalist, and activist for the LGBT community. While he has stated that he is now an atheist, he also said that he still identifies as "culturally Catholic".
- Richard B. Spencer (born 1978): American alt-right and white supremacist personality, says that he is an atheist, but described himself as a "cultural Christian".
- Andrew Tompkins, lead singer and bassist of the Australian Christian-themed doom metal band Paramaecium. Tompkins responded to questions of his faith by stating "...As to whether I'm a practicing Christian, I usually tell people I'm a practicing Christian but not a believing Christian."
- Gretta Vosper (born 1958): United Church of Canada minister who is an atheist.
- Bogusław Wolniewicz (1927–2017): Polish right-wing philosopher, who called himself as a "Roman Catholic nonbeliever".

== See also ==
- Asimov's Guide to the Bible by Isaac Asimov
- Atheism in Christianity by Ernst Bloch
- Christian agnosticism
- Christian deism
- Christ myth theory
- Demythologization
- Lloyd Geering
- God-Building
- God Is Not Great by Christopher Hitchens
- Jefferson Bible
- Jewish atheism
- Materialism and Christianity
- Nontheist Quakers (also known as "nontheist Friends")
- Nontheistic religion
- Religious naturalism
- Postchristianity
- Robert Jensen
- Robert M. Price
- Sea of Faith
- Secular humanism
- Spiritual but not religious
- Spiritualism
