= Skidoo (film) =

1968 film by Otto Preminger

- Theatrical release poster
- Directed by: Otto Preminger
- Written by: Doran William Cannon; Rob Reiner (uncredited)
- Produced by: Otto Preminger
- Starring: Jackie Gleason; Carol Channing; Frankie Avalon; Fred Clark; Michael Constantine; Frank Gorshin; John Phillip Law; Peter Lawford; Burgess Meredith; George Raft; Cesar Romero; Mickey Rooney; Groucho Marx; Austin Pendleton; Alexandra Hay; Luna
- Cinematography: Leon Shamroy A.S.C.
- Edited by: George Rohrs
- Music by: Nilsson
- Production company: Sigma Productions
- Distributed by: Paramount Pictures
- Release date: December 19, 1968 (US)
- Running time: 97 minutes
- Country: United States
- Language: English

Skidoo is a 1968 American comedy film directed by Otto Preminger, starring Jackie Gleason, Carol Channing, Frankie Avalon, Fred Clark (who died on December 5, two weeks before the film's release), Michael Constantine, Frank Gorshin, John Phillip Law, Peter Lawford, Burgess Meredith, George Raft, Cesar Romero, Mickey Rooney, and Groucho Marx playing a top mobster named "God". It was written by Doran William Cannon and released by Paramount Pictures on December 19, 1968. The screenplay satirizes late-1960s counterculture lifestyle and its creature comforts, technology, anti-technology, hippies, free love and then-topical use of the drug LSD.

Singer-songwriter Harry Nilsson, who wrote the score and receives credit as a member of the cast, appears in a few brief scenes with Fred Clark, as both portray prison tower guards swaying to Nilsson's music while under the influence of LSD.

== Plot ==
=== Prologue ===
As a cartoon character dressed in prison stripes (and holding a peace-logo flower which turns into a tiny parasol and then a helicopter blade) executes a few dance steps to the music of Nilsson's Skidoo theme, the words "Otto Preminger" appear below him. Additional words "presents SKIDOO starring" can also be seen as the camera pulls back to reveal that this image is on a TV screen, while Carol Channing's voice is heard exclaiming to Arnold Stang: "No, Harry, not that. No, I don't wanna see that," with the sound of a Zenith Space Command mechanical ultrasonic TV remote accompanying the channel suddenly switching to show a US Senate hearing conducted by a senator, portrayed by Peter Lawford, who asks a series of organized crime figures various questions to which they invariably reply: "I refuse to answer on the grounds it may tend to incriminate me."

Every few seconds, the screen showing the hearing switches through non-broadcasting channels to another broadcast channel which is screening Preminger's black-and-white 1965 feature, In Harm's Way, and through more non-broadcasting channels to other channels which have one spurious commercial after another. The initial ad depicts an attractive blonde declaring, "now you too can be beautiful and sexually desirable like me instead of being that fat, disgusting, foul-breathed, slimy, wallowing sow that you are", the second has another intensely smiling blonde stating that "maybe we blondes do have more fun" and the third ad depicts a drunken slob swilling beer and belching, interspersed with an image of a pig with beer foam around its snout, while an unseen announcer exclaims: "feel big, drink pig!"

After another switch to In Harm's Way, Channing's voice is again heard, complaining, "no, Harry, I don't like films on TV. They always cut them to pieces." Additional channel changes produce more images of the beer pig, then another scene from In Harm's Way, followed by an ad for "Fat Cola", with three generously proportioned middle-aged women, wearing bathing suits, beach hats and carrying little parasols, gyrating to the jingle, "You'll never lose your man if you drink Fat Cola, you'll never have to worry about losing him", then an ad showing a boy and a girl, both about six years old, dressed like adults at a picnic setting, next to a dog resembling Our Gang's Pete the Pup (Pete's trademark circular ring around the eye is here drawn at a sharply oblique angle), with all three vigorously emitting smoke from long cigarettes held in their mouths, while happy young voices sing the jingle: "Puff, puff, puff, puff, puff, if you want to have a girly, you must puff, puff, puff."

The following ad shows a family, including small children, standing in front of their house, all holding guns, with the father declaring, "...get a gun for everyone in your family — remember, for family fun, get your gun", while the next ad, for "New Daisy Chain Deodorant," has a male voice followed a female voice singing ever more insistently, "I want my deodorant, I want my deodorant..."

Next, a balding, mustachioed pitchman presents a fast-talking spiel that "if you suffer from aches and pains, upset stomach, ulcers... dandruff, athlete's foot and the common cold, cancer, birth defects, mental illness, ringworm, poison ivy, tooth decay, acne, measles, brain tumor, smallpox, syphilis, plague, influenza, hepatitis and St. Vitus... dance, hah, hah, hah... well, you're in luck, friend. Pick a pack of Peter's perfidious pink pacifying placebo pills..." Interspersed with the channel changes, Jackie Gleason, Carol Channing and Arnold Stang are shown sitting in front of the TV, with Gleason and Channing at war, each with a Zenith Space Command mechanical ultrasonic remote control, switching the channel to and away from the Senate hearing. Gleason and Stang subsequently go to the kitchen and, as they come out, the TV screen shows combative 1960s TV personality Joe Pyne commenting on the hearings: "...and, as one witness follows another, Senator Hummel is getting the same answer Senator Kefauver got in 1950 and 1951..."

=== Storyline ===
Tony Banks (Jackie Gleason), a retired mob "torpedo" (hitman), now settled with wife Flo (Carol Channing) and daughter Darlene (Alexandra Hay), worries about his daughter's new hippie boyfriend Stash (John Phillip Law), and his own paternity of Darlene. A father-and-son pair of mob bosses, Hechy (Cesar Romero) and Angie (Frankie Avalon), bring Tony the news that top mobster "God" (Groucho Marx) wants him to carry out one last job – liquidating his old pal, "Blue Chips" Packard (Mickey Rooney), before Packard can testify before the US Senate's Crime Commission. Tony refuses, but upon discovering another old friend, Harry (Arnold Stang), shot through the head, goes along with God's wishes and, now wearing a convict's striped outfit, finds himself in Rock Island Federal Penitentiary, a futuristic, high-tech, Alcatraz-style institution where Packard is held under top-level protection.

In Tony's absence, Stash and his friends, who have been charged with vagrancy, are invited by Flo to stay at their house. She visits Angie (as does Darlene, also seeking to find out what happened to her father) to persuade him to either cancel the job, or take her to God (who's living without a country, on a yacht in international waters) so she can ask personally. Angie won't take Flo, but he will take Darlene, who nonetheless insists on bringing Stash along. God takes a liking to Darlene, as does God's tall, supermodel-like black mistress (Luna) to Stash, but both are frustrated in their pursuit.

One of Tony's cellmates turns out to be a draft dodger called Fred the Professor (Austin Pendleton), an electronics wizard who has renounced technology, but makes an exception in rigging a television set to allow Banks the opportunity of cell-to-cell communication with Packard. Banks realizes he can't kill his old friend, and, as a result, will probably never leave the prison. He writes his wife with the news, on stationery borrowed from Fred, while ignoring Fred's admonition not to lick the envelope and discovering the hard way that all the stationery is soaked with LSD... enough to send the whole prison on a bad trip. One of the inmates, Leech (Michael Constantine) says, "Hey, maybe if I take some of that stuff, I wouldn't have to rape anybody anymore." Fred guides Tony through the resulting acid experience, helping him come to terms with his worries about Darlene and his past while plotting their escape.

Darlene and Stash spend the night aboard God's yacht, with Stash getting word back to Flo and his friends about their location, and a coded plea for help. As the hippies mount a rescue, Tony and Fred build a makeshift balloon from discarded freezer bags and garbage cans, dump the whole supply of stationery into the prison's lunch, and fly out of the prison as everyone below begins to freak out.

As it happens, both the hippies (led by Flo, who sings "Skidoo" as they storm the yacht) and the balloon arrive on God's hideaway at the same time. Feeling trapped, God adopts a stooped "Groucho posture", skulks into a closet in his cabin and closes the door. Flo and Tony are last seen as Flo pulls Tony toward a bed in one of the yacht's empty side cabins, while in the main cabin, God's Skipper (George Raft), holding open a copy of Gabriel Vahanian's 1961 book (widely read during counterculture era), The Death of God, performs a marriage ceremony between Angie and the much-taller God's Mistress, who then proceeds to become overly affectionate with surprised best-man/father-figure Hechy, as the dismayed Angie tries to separate them. Behind them, another ceremony, performed by a hippie "minister" named Geronimo (Tom Law, the brother of John Phillip Law), using the Skipper's Death of God book, joins "this brother and this sister" (Stash and Darlene) "in holy union". Then, in calm waters, a small sailboat, with sails decorated in large psychedelic designs of the words "LOVE" and "PEACE", holds two occupants – Fred the Professor and God, both dressed in transcendental meditation / Hare Krishna garb. As Nilsson's voice is heard singing "I Will Take You There", they smile beatifically while sharing a lit joint and, after taking a puff, God murmurs, "...mmm, pumpkin".

=== Epilogue ===
As the final scene becomes a freeze-frame shot, Otto Preminger's familiar accented voice is heard intoning, "Stop! we are not through yet, and before you skidoo, we'd like to introduce our cast and crew..." The entire credit sequence is then sung by Nilsson (including all cast, crew, and copyright information), with various asides ("and Luna as God's Mistress, well you know-oh what I mean"... "arranged and conducted by George Tipton, a very good friend"... "Visual consultant and titles by Sandy Dvore and, what's more, they were executed by Pacific... ahem, how's your popcorn?, copyright em, see, em, el, ex, vee, eye, eye, eye [MCMLXVIII] by Sigma Productions Incorporated, your seat's on fire").

== Cast ==
Credits are given in the same order they are sung by Nilsson over the closing credits

- Jackie Gleason as Tony Banks
- Carol Channing as Flo
- Frankie Avalon as Angie
- Fred Clark as A Tower Guard
- Michael Constantine as Leech
- Frank Gorshin as the Man
- John Phillip Law as Stash
- Peter Lawford as The Senator
- Burgess Meredith as The Warden
- George Raft as The Skipper
- Cesar Romero as Hechy
- Mickey Rooney as "Blue Chips" Packard
- Groucho Marx as "God"
- Arnold Stang as Harry
- Doro Merande as The Mayor
- Phil Arnold as Her Husband
- Slim Pickens as The Switchboard Operator
- Robert Donner as Another Switchboard Operator
- Richard Kiel as Beany
- Tom Law as Geronimo
- Jaik Rosenstein as "Eggs" Benedict
- Stacy King as The Amazon
- Renny Roker as A Prison Guard
- Roman Gabriel as A Prison Guard
- Nilsson as A Tower Guard
- Stone Country as Themselves
- The Orange County Ramblers as The Green Bay Packers
- Austin Pendleton as Fred
- Alexandra Hay as Darlene
- Luna as "God's" mistress

== Production ==
Writer Paul Krassner published a story in the February 1981 issue of High Times magazine, relating how Groucho Marx prepared for his role in the LSD-related movie by taking a dose of the drug in Krassner's company, and had a moving, largely pleasant experience. In his 1976 book, The Groucho Phile, Marx – who, having abandoned his trademark greasepaint mustache twenty years prior for You Bet Your Life, returned to using greasepaint for this film – commented that both the movie and his performance as the mob boss God were "God-awful!" Most of the rest of the cast and crew, though, apparently had no familiarity with the drug; in a later interview, Nilsson recounted that he simply pretended to be drunk for his role (his own subsequent LSD experience inspired The Point!, a 1970 animated movie Nilsson wrote and scored).

Pop culture buffs have noted that three cast members, Frank Gorshin (The Riddler), Burgess Meredith (The Penguin) and Cesar Romero (The Joker), played recurring villains in the 1966–68 Batman television series, which broadcast its final episode in March, nine months before Skidoo's release. The film's then-futuristic costume designer, Rudi Gernreich, also made an acting appearance on Batman and, in one 1966 two-part episode, Otto Preminger himself portrayed another of the show's recurring villains, Mr. Freeze.

After Preminger saw him perform with The Committee, an uncredited Rob Reiner was brought in to "write scenes for hippies".

The scenes on God's yacht were shot on John Wayne's yacht, Wild Goose, the former US Navy minesweeper USS YMS-328. Wild Goose was used extensively with scenes shot from the exterior and in the wheel house, cabins, engine room, upper and lower decks. Part of the movie was filmed at the South San Francisco City Hall.

It was one of several films Preminger made with Peter Lawford.

== Release and reception ==
=== Critical reception ===
Skidoo was a notorious bomb, failing both with critics and at the box office. Variety called it "a dreary, unfunny attempt at contemporary comedy." Roger Ebert gave it two out of four stars. He praised almost everything about it except for its lack of spirit, explaining that Preminger "seems unable to invest his film with any lightness or spontaneity" and that his directing style was "more suited to weighty subject matter." Addressing one of the movie's deficiencies, Ebert added, "I have a feeling that it chills Preminger's very soul to imagine he might ever ask an actor to improvise." Vincent Canby wrote that it was "something only for Preminger-watchers, or for people whose minds need pressing by a heavy, flat object." He was also highly critical of the casting of older stars, saying that "Preminger's use of disintegrating faces is more cruel than comic."

In 1973, Jonathan Rosenbaum said he valued the film as an "endlessly fascinating aberration... [it] enlists a legion of Fifties TV corpses into an amalgamation of every conceivable Hollywood genre." In his 2011 review of the DVD in his New York Times column, Dave Kehr framed the film as the product of Preminger being "politically aligned with the kids... but culturally bound to the grownups", which "allows his ambivalence to fester into an across-the-board caricature... The result is a finely controlled mess, one of the most uncomfortably evocative films of its time."

Filmink argued "the film that essentially killed Avalon’s career as a movie star" although stating "Avalon is really good... funny and charming, suiting the anarchy of the movie, positively understated in his scenes with Channing, and far more energetic than Groucho Marx (whose appearance is sad). Out of all the cast, Avalon might be considered to have given the best performance (though Frank Gorshin is pretty good too). However, Skidoo was such a critical and commercial disaster that the film hurt Avalon’s acting career."

=== Legacy ===
Following the December 19, 1968 release of Skidoo, Otto Preminger (wearing a Nehru jacket), Nilsson (performing music and songs from the film), and Carol Channing appeared with Hugh Hefner on the February 15, 1969 episode of the syndicated series Playboy After Dark. Clips from the episode would later appear in the 2006 documentary Who Is Harry Nilsson (And Why Is Everybody Talkin' About Him)?

The movie received some belated attention in the late 1970s when it was screened at San Francisco's Roxie Cinema and in the 1980s on cable TV. New York City's Museum of Modern Art periodically exhibits a 35mm print, and it also screened at the USA Film Festival in Dallas in 1997 and had a Los Angeles showing in 2007 at the American Cinematheque.

On January 4–5 and July 11–12, 2008, Skidoo was seen as an installment of Turner Classic Movies Friday night–Saturday morning TCM Underground series, paired with the similarly acid-soaked 1967 feature The Love-Ins. Each film features a brief appearance by then-famous/notorious chain-smoking, "tough-guy" syndicated TV talk show host Joe Pyne, who died of lung cancer in March 1970 at age 45.

Olive Films released the film on DVD in its original aspect ratio on July 19, 2011.

== See also ==
- List of American films of 1968
- List of films featuring hallucinogens
