= Manuel Bueno =

Manuel Bueno may refer to:

- San Manuel Bueno, Mártir, 1931 short novel by Miguel de Unamuno
- Manolín Bueno (born 1940), Manuel Bueno Cabral, Spanish football forward
- Manu Bueno (born 2004), Manuel Bueno Sebastián, Spanish football midfielder for Sevilla
