= Thomas J. J. Altizer =

American professor and theologian

Thomas Jonathan Jackson Altizer (May 28, 1927 – November 28, 2018) was an American university professor, religious scholar, and theologian, noted for his incorporation of Death of God theology and Hegelian dialectical philosophy into his body of work. He regarded his philosophical theology as also being grounded in the works of William Blake and considered his theology to have come into its own with his extended study of Blake's radical visionary thinking: The New Apocalypse: The Radical Christian Vision of William Blake (1967); indeed he regarded himself as the first and only fully Blakean theologian.

== Education ==
Altizer was born in Cambridge, Massachusetts, on May 28, 1927, and grew up with two sisters in Charleston, West Virginia. He attended St. John's College in Annapolis, Maryland, and the University of Chicago, from which he received his bachelor's, master's, and doctoral degrees. His 1951 master's thesis examined the concepts of nature and grace in Augustine of Hippo. His doctoral dissertation in 1955, under the direction by historian of religions Joachim Wach, examined Carl Gustav Jung's understanding of religion.

After receiving his doctoral degree, he sought ordination as an Episcopal priest, but failed the psychiatric test. He relates that shortly before this, he had a terrifying experience: "I suddenly awoke and became truly possessed and experienced an epiphany of Satan which I have never been able fully to deny, an experience in which I could actually feel Satan consuming me, absorbing me into his very being, as though this was the deepest possible initiation and bonding, and the deepest and yet most horrible union." He adds that it was perhaps the deepest experience of his life, and one that he believes "profoundly affected my vocation as a theologian, and even my theological work itself." However, a second notable religious experience happened in 1955, while reading an essay on Nietzsche and Rilke, Altizer truly experienced the death of God as a conversion. “…it truly paralleled my earlier experience of the epiphany of Satan, this time I experienced a pure grace, as though it were the very reversal of my experience of Satan.”

He was assistant professor of religion at Wabash College in Crawfordsville, Indiana, from 1954 to 1956. He went on to become an associate professor of Bible and religion at Emory University from 1956 to 1968. He was professor of Religious Studies at the Stony Brook University from 1968 to 1996. Until his death in 2018, he was Professor Emeritus of Religious Studies at the university.

== "Death of God" controversy ==
During Altizer's time at Emory, two Time magazine articles featured his religious views—in the October 1965 and April 1966 issues. The latter issue, published at Easter time, put the question on its cover in bold red letters on a plain black background: "Is God Dead?"

Altizer repeatedly claimed that the scorn, outcry, and even death threats he subsequently received were misplaced. Altizer's religious proclamation viewed God's death (really a self-extinction) as a process that began at the world's creation and came to an end through Jesus Christ—whose crucifixion in reality poured out God's full spirit into this world. In developing his position Altizer drew upon the dialectical thought of Hegel, the visionary writings of William Blake, the anthroposophical thought of Owen Barfield, and aspects of Mircea Eliade's studies of the sacred and the profane.

In the mid-1960s Altizer was drawn into discussions about his views with other radical Christian theologians such as Gabriel Vahanian, William Hamilton, and Paul Van Buren, and also the rabbi Richard Rubenstein. Those religious scholars collectively formed a loose network of thinkers who held different versions of the death of God. Altizer also entered into formal critical debates with the orthodox Lutheran John Warwick Montgomery, and the Christian countercult movement apologist Walter Martin. The conservative theologians faulted Altizer on philosophical, methodological and theological questions, such as his reliance on Hegelian dialectical thought, his idiosyncratic semantic use of theological words, and the interpretative principles he used in understanding biblical literature.

In Godhead and the Nothing (2003), Altizer examined the notion of evil. He presented evil as the absence of will, but not separate from God. Orthodox Christianity—considered nihilistic by Nietzsche—named evil and separated it from good without thoroughly examining its nature. However, the immanence of the spirit (after Jesus Christ) within the world embraces everything created. The immanence of the spirit is the answer to the nihilistic state that Christianity, according to Nietzsche, was leading the world into. Through the introduction of God in the material world (immanence), the emptying of meaning would cease. No longer would followers be able to dismiss the present world for a transcendent world. They would have to embrace the present completely, and keep meaning in the here and now.

Beginning in 1996 Altizer lived in the Pocono Mountains, Pennsylvania. His 2006 memoir is entitled Living the Death of God.

== See also ==
- Christian atheism

== Critical assessment ==
- Montgomery, James Warwick (1966). "Is God Dead? A Philosophical-Theological Critique of the Death of God Movement". The Asbury Journal. 20 (2): 40–76. ISSN 2375-6330.
- The Death of the Death of God [audiotapes], debate between Thomas Alltizer and John W. Montgomery at the Rockefeller Chapel, University of Chicago, February 24, 1967.
- Altizer, Thomas J. J.; Montgomery, John Warwick (1967). The Altizer-Montgomery Dialogue: A Chapter in the God is Dead Controversy. Inter-Varsity Press.
- Gilkey, Langdon Brown (1969). Naming the whirlwind: the renewal of God-language. Bobbs-Merrill. ISBN 9780672607967. "Altizer."
- Montgomery, John Warwick (1970). The suicide of Christian theology. Bethany Fellowship. ISBN 9780871235213.
- Cobb, John B. (1970). The Theology of Altizer: Critique and Response. Westminster John Knox Press. ISBN 9780664208912.
- Schoonenberg, Piet, "The Transcendence of God, Part I," Transcendence and Immanence, Reconstruction in the Light of Process Thinking, Festschrift in Honour of Joseph Papin, ed. Joseph Armenti, St. Meinrad: The Abbey Press, 1972: 157–166.
- Schoonenberg, Piet, "From Transcendence to Immanence, Part II," Wisdom and Knowledge, Essays in Honour of Joseph Papin, ed. Joseph Armenti, Villanova University Press, 1976: 273–282.
- Taylor, Mark C. (1984-09-01). "Altizer's Originality: A Review Essay" (PDF). Journal of the American Academy of Religion. 52 (3): 569–584. doi:10.1093/jaarel/52.3.569. ISSN 0002-7189.
- Odin, Steve. "Kenosis as a Foundation for Buddhist. Christian Dialogue. The Kenostic Buddhology of Nishida and Nishitani of the Kyoto School in Relation to the Kenotic Christology of Thomas J. J. Altizer". Eastern Buddhist. New Series. 20 (1). ISSN 0012-8708.
- Corrington, Robert S. (1992-04-01). "Genesis and Apocalypse: A Theological Voyage Toward Authentic Christianity By Thomas J.J. Altizer Louisville, Westminster/John Knox, 1990. 198 pp. $18.95". Theology Today. 49 (1): 132–134. doi:10.1177/004057369204900121. S2CID 170385467.
- Lee, Feero, Richard (1993). Radical theology in preparation: From Altizer to Edwards (Thesis). Syracuse University.
- Leahy, David G. (1996). Foundation: Matter the Body Itself. SUNY Press. ISBN 9780791420218.
- McCullough, Lissa (2012-02-01). "Historical Introduction". In McCullough, Lissa; Schroeder, Brian (eds.). Thinking through the Death of God: A Critical Companion to Thomas J. J. Altizer. SUNY Press. ISBN 9780791484395.
- Rodkey, Christopher D. (Fall 2005). "Thinking Through the Death of God" (PDF). Journal for Cultural and Religious Theory. 6 (3): 109–115.
- McCullough, Lissa (Fall 2008). "Death of God Reprise: Altizer, Taylor, Vattimo, Caputo, Vahanian". Journal for Cultural and Religious Theory. 9 (3): 97–109.
- Harris, Matthew E. (2011). "Gianni Vattimo And Thomas J. J. Altizer on the Incarnation and the Death Of God: A Comparison" (PDF). Minerva. 15: 1–19.
- McCullough, Lissa (Spring 2013). "Interview with Thomas J.J. Altizer" (PDF). Journal for Cultural and Religious Theory. 12 (3): 169–185.

== Bibliography ==
- Oriental Mysticism and Biblical Eschatology (Philadelphia: Westminster, 1961).
- Mircea Eliade and the Dialectic of the Sacred (Philadelphia: Westminster, 1963; Westport: Greenwood, 1975). ISBN 0-8371-7196-2
- Radical Theology and the Death of God, co-authored with William Hamilton (Indianapolis: Bobbs-Merrill, 1966; Harmondsworth: Penguin, 1968).
- The Gospel of Christian Atheism (Philadelphia: Westminster, 1966).
- The New Apocalypse: The Radical Christian Vision of William Blake (East Lansing: Michigan State University Press, 1967; Aurora, CO: Davies Group, 2000). ISBN 1-888570-56-3
- Toward A New Christianity: Readings in the Death of God, ed. Altizer (New York: Harcourt, Brace & World, 1967).
- The Descent into Hell (Philadelphia: Lippincott, 1970).
- The Self-Embodiment of God (New York: Harper & Row, 1977). ISBN 0-06-060160-4
- Total Presence: The Language of Jesus and the Language of Today (New York: Seabury, 1980). ISBN 0-8164-0461-5
- History as Apocalypse (Albany: State University of New York Press, 1985). ISBN 0-88706-013-7
- Genesis and Apocalypse: A Theological Voyage Toward Authentic Christianity (Louisville: Westminster John Knox, 1990). ISBN 0-664-21932-2
- The Genesis of God (Louisville: Westminster/John Knox, 1993). ISBN 0-664-21996-9
- The Contemporary Jesus (Albany: State University of New York Press, 1997). ISBN 0-7914-3375-7
- The New Gospel of Christian Atheism (Aurora: Davies Group, 2002). ISBN 1-888570-65-2
- Godhead and the Nothing (Albany: State University of New York Press, 2003). ISBN 0-7914-5795-8
- Living the Death of God: A Theological Memoir (Albany: State University of New York Press, 2006). ISBN 0-7914-6757-0
- The Call to Radical Theology, ed. Lissa McCullough (Albany: State University of New York Press, 2012). ISBN 978-1-4384-4451-2
- The Apocalyptic Trinity (New York: Palgrave Macmillan, 2012).
- Thomas J. J. Altizer Comprehensive Bibliography — Listing books, articles, essays, book reviews, and related writings.
- Thomas J. J. Altizer Papers, Special Collections Research Center, Syracuse University Libraries — The Thomas J. J. Altizer Papers contain correspondence (1960–1970); typescript books and page proofs; published articles and essays; three audio tapes; and four scrapbooks. Much of the correspondence pertains to the "death of God" movement of the 1960s, of which Altizer was a leader. Arranged in four series: Audiotape recordings: three tapes with recordings of appearances at colleges and on radio programs. Correspondence: primarily responses to Altizer's "death of God" theology representing a wide variety of opinions from grade-school children to learned theologians. Printed material: essays and miscellany. Writings: books, essays, and magazine articles by Altizer. There are no access restrictions on this material.

== See also ==
- Theodicy#Essential kenosis
