= Gabriel Vahanian =

French-Armenian theologian (1927–2012)

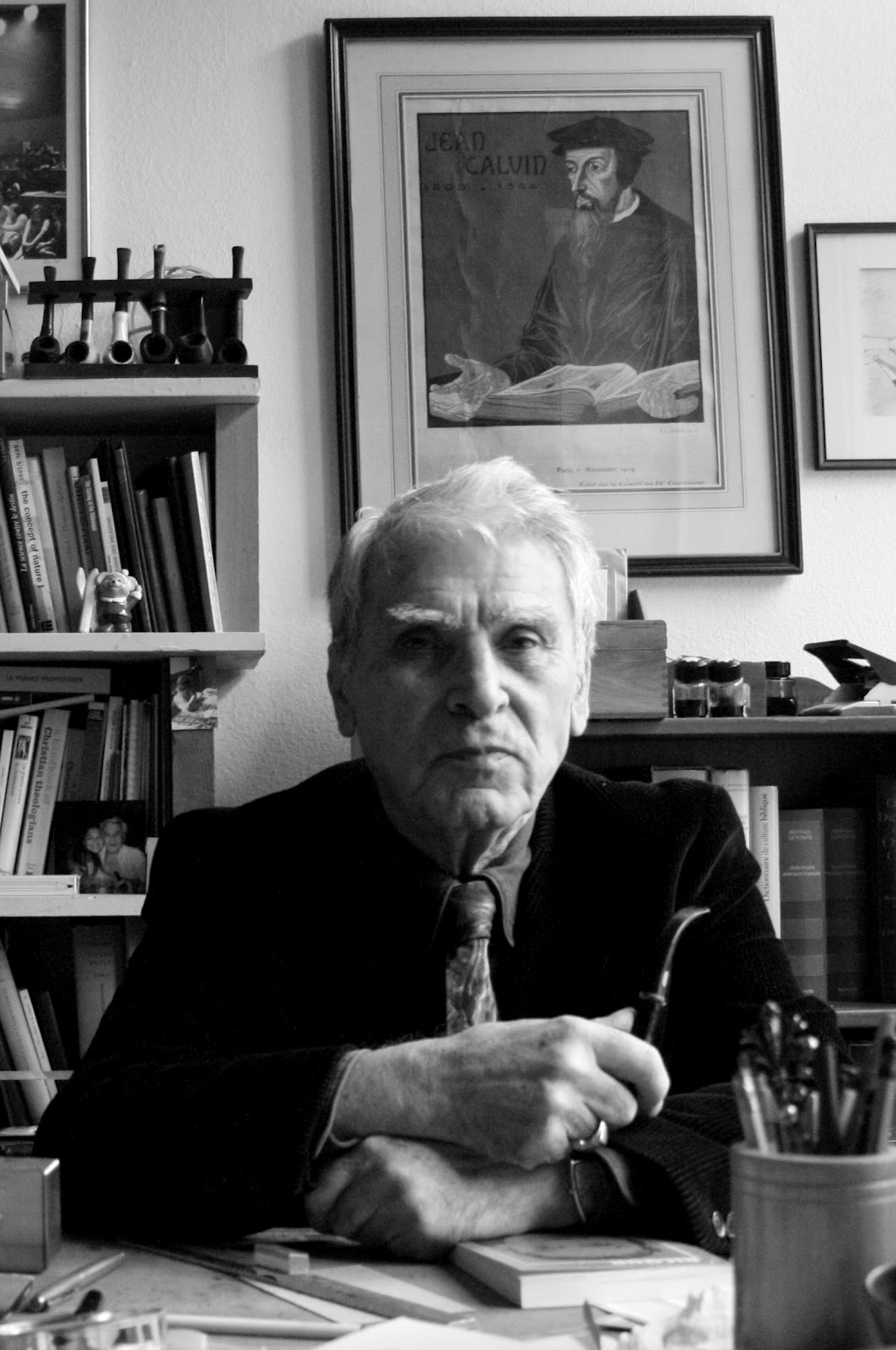

Gabriel Vahanian (in Armenian Գաբրիէլ Վահանեան; 24 January 1927 – 30 August 2012) was a French Protestant Christian theologian who was most remembered for his pioneering work in the theology of the "death of God" movement within academic circles in the 1960s, and who taught for 26 years in the U.S. before finishing a prestigious career in Strasbourg, France.

== Education and career ==
Vahanian was born Gabriel Antoine Vahanian in Marseille, France, to a family of refugees of the Armenian genocide. He received his French baccalaureate (baccalauréat) in 1945 from the Lycee of Valence in France and then graduated from the Protestant Faculty of Theology in Paris, his master's degree in Theology in 1950 from Princeton Theological Seminary, and his Ph.D. in 1958, also from PTS. His dissertation was entitled "Protestantism and the Arts".

He then served on the faculty of Syracuse University for 26 years. At Syracuse he held the Eliphalet Remington chair in Religion from 1967 to 1973, and then the Jeanette Kittredge Watson chair in Religion from 1973-1984, and founded in 1968 and was the first director of the graduate studies program in religion.

He moved in 1984 to the Université des Sciences Humaines de Strasbourg, for a post considered France's most prominent theological professorship of Protestantism. He ended his career as Professor Emeritus of Cultural Theology at the Université Marc Bloch and its successor, the combined University of Strasbourg. He was a churchgoing Presbyterian his entire life and criticized efforts to modernize Christianity.

== Work ==
Vahanian was educated in the Reformed theological stream of John Calvin and of Karl Barth, and he translated Barth's The Faith of the Church. He was very distinguished in his interests in the relationship between literature and theology, and between culture and religion. One French Protestant contemporary of his was the lay theologian and social critic Jacques Ellul.

Vahanian was a founding member of the first board of directors of the American Academy of Religion in 1964.

His first book, entitled The Death of God: The Culture of our Post-Christian Era (1961), was hailed by Rudolf Bultmann as a landmark of theological criticism. During the 1960s the theological writings of Vahanian, Harvey Cox, Paul Van Buren, William Hamilton, Thomas J. J. Altizer, and Richard Rubenstein came to be regarded by many observers as a new Christian and Jewish movement advocating the death of God. However, as the conservative evangelical John Warwick Montgomery noted, Vahanian's position was deemed to be "hopelessly conservative by the advocates of Christian atheism". (Suicide of Christian Theology, p. 80). Vahanian expressed his understanding of the "death of God" as happening when God is turned into a cultural artifact. Vahanian was alarmed at the objectification of God:

The Christian era has bequeathed us the 'death of God,' but not without teaching us a lesson. God is not necessary; that is to say, he cannot be taken for granted. He cannot be used merely as a hypothesis, whether epistemological, scientific, or existential, unless we should draw the degrading conclusion that 'God is reasons.' On the other hand, if we can no longer assume that God is, we may once again realize that he must be. God is not necessary, but he is inevitable. He is wholly other and wholly present. Faith in him, the conversion of our human reality, both culturally and existentially, is the demand he still makes upon us.

— Wait Without Idols, p. 46

He contributed articles on wide-ranging topics to journals and magazines such as The Nation, The Christian Century and Réforme or Foi et Vie and the Biblioteca dell'Archivio di filosofia. He was the recipient of the American Council of Learned Societies and served as a consulting member of the Presidential Commission on biomedical ethics. He lectured throughout North America, Latin America, Europe and Asia. In 2005, he was invited to be the keynote speaker at the annual convention of the Association of Christian Studies, where he lectured on "A Secular Christ: Against the Religious Parochialism of East and West" (forthcoming). His more recent publications include Anonymous God (2003), Tillich and the New Religious Paradigm (2004), and Praise of the Secular (2008). His personal papers from the period 1945–1971 are held in the archives of Syracuse University.

== Bibliography ==
- The Death of God: The Culture of Our Post-Christian Era (New York: George Braziller, 1961).
- — (Autumn 1962). "Beyond the Death of God". Dialog. doi:10.1111/j.1540-6385.1962.tb00004.x. S2CID 248578396.
- — (Spring 1964). "The Future of Christianity in a Post-Christian Era". The Centennial Review.
- Wait Without Idols (New York: George Braziller, 1964).
- No Other God (New York: George Braziller, 1966).
- God and Utopia: The Church in a Technological Civilization (New York: Seabury Press, 1977). ISBN 0-8164-0355-4
- L'utopie chrétienne (Paris: Desclée de Brouwer, 1992). ISBN 2-220-03244-2
- La foi, une fois pour toutes: meditations kierkegaardiennes (Geneve: Labor et Fides, 1996). ISBN 2-8309-0836-8
- Anonymous God: An Essay on Not Dreading Words (Aurora: Davies, 2002). ISBN 1-888570-57-1
- Tillich and the New Religious Paradigm (Aurora: Davies, 2004). ISBN 1-888570-62-8
- Praise of the Secular (Charlottesville, VA: University of Virginia Press, 2008). ISBN 978-0813927039

== Critical assessments ==
- John Warwick Montgomery, The 'Is God Dead?' Controversy (Grand Rapids: Zondervan, 1966).
- John Warwick Montgomery, The Suicide of Christian Theology (Minneapolis: Bethany Fellowship, 1970). ISBN 0-87123-521-8
- Mack B. Stokes, "The Nontheistic Temper of the Modern Mind". Religion in Life, vol. 24 (Spring 1965), pp. 245–57.
