= William Hamilton (theologian) =

Theologian and proponent of the death of God movement

William Hughes Hamilton
- Born: March 9, 1924; Evanston, Illinois, US
- Died: February 28, 2012 (aged 87); Portland, Oregon, US
- Notable work: Radical Theology and the Death of God (1966)
- Spouse: Mary Jean (Golden) Hamilton. (1925-2016)
- Children: 5
- Theological work
- Tradition or movement: Death of God theology

William Hughes Hamilton III (March 9, 1924 – February 28, 2012) was a prominent theologian and proponent of the Death of God movement. Hamilton died in 2012 at age 87 in Portland, Oregon.

== Education and career ==
Hamilton was born March 9, 1924, to William Hughes Hamilton II and Helen Hamilton (née Anderson). in Evanston, Illinois. In 1943 Hamilton graduated from Oberlin College. He served in the United States Navy during World War II, then earned a master's degree from Union Theological Seminary in the City of New York in 1949. In 1952 Hamilton received a doctorate in theology from the University of St Andrews in Scotland.

Hamilton and fellow theologian Thomas J. J. Altizer co-authored the book Radical Theology and the Death of God (1966). Time magazine published the article "Is God Dead?" that same year. In 1953 Hamilton joined the faculty at Colgate Rochester Crozer Divinity School until he lost his endowed chair in 1967 due to the intense backlash regarding the Time magazine article. Hundreds of letters came to the President (Gene Bartlett) of Colgate Rochester (Crozer) Divinity School demanding his being fired. In fact, TIME Magazine received 4000 letters after the infamous cover appeared. Letters to the local Rochester paper, (The Democrat and Chronicle) poured in to protest. Alumni and doners to seminary threatened withholding funds until he was let go. Even his colleagues turned against him with very little support to be found. He was not fired, but with little choice at hand, he moved his family to Sarasota Florida and then taught religion at New College, then a new experimental liberal arts school, before becoming a faculty member at Portland State University in 1970. There he served as Dean of Arts and Letters until his retirement in 1986.

In 1949 Hamilton married Mary Jean Golden, a dancer with the New York City Ballet. They had five children: Ross, Donald, Catherine, Patrick and Jean. Hamilton died of complications from congestive heart failure in his home on February 28, 2012, at age 87 in Portland, Oregon.

== See also ==
- Christian atheism
- List of Oberlin College alumni
- List of people from Evanston, Illinois
- List of people from Portland, Oregon
