= Atheism in Christianity =

1968 book by Ernst Bloch

Atheism in Christianity: The Religion of the Exodus and the Kingdom
- Author: Ernst Bloch
- Original title: Atheismus im Christentum: Zur Religion des Exodus und des Reichs
- Language: German
- Subjects: Christian theology; marxism
- Publication date: 1968
- Publication place: Germany
- English publication date: 1972
- Media type: Print (paperback)

Atheism in Christianity: The Religion of the Exodus and the Kingdom (German: Atheismus im Christentum: Zur Religion des Exodus und des Reichs) is a 1968 book by German Marxist philosopher Ernst Bloch. The book offers a third way to the Christian/atheist either/or debate. Gareth Jenkins from Socialist Review says that Bloch "argues that there are liberatory, 'atheist' elements within Christianity with which socialists should make common cause."

== Context ==
Bloch engaged with a Christian-Marxist intellectual dialogue group organized by Milan Machovec and others in 1960s Communist Czechoslovakia. His Atheism in Christianity echoed in Machovec's 1969 book Jesus for Modern Man (Ježíš pro moderního člověka), published in German in 1972 as Jesus für Atheisten.

== Reception ==
Nicholas Lezard of The Guardian called the book "exhilarating to read".

== See also ==
- Christian atheism
