= John T. Elson =

Magazine editor (1931-2009)

- Born: April 29, 1931; Vancouver, British Columbia, Canada
- Died: September 7, 2009 (aged 78); Manhattan, New York, U.S.
- Occupations: Religion writer and editor
- Parent: Robert T. Elson

John Truscott Elson (April 29, 1931 – September 7, 2009) was a religion editor and writer who eventually became the assistant managing editor of Time. He is most remembered for his provocative April 1966 cover story for which the magazine's cover simply asked, "Is God Dead?"

== Biography ==
=== Early years ===
Born in Vancouver, British Columbia, Elson was the son of Robert T. Elson, a newspaper reporter who became an editor at Time and Life. He attended St. Anselm's Abbey School (then known as the Priory School) in Washington, D.C. and received an undergraduate degree from University of Notre Dame in 1953. He also received a master's degree in English from Columbia University in 1954.

Elson entered the United States Air Force Reserve in August 1954 as a second lieutenant and served for two years. He was initially stationed at Parks Air Force Base in California and later was in Japan. He became a reporter for the Canadian Press news agency. He was hired at Time and worked initially in the Detroit bureau. In 1967, he became a senior editor in charge of the sections for religion, theatre, cinema and education. He remained at Time in 1987 and eventually held the position of assistant managing editor.

=== 1966 cover story: "Is God Dead?" ===
He was the religion editor at Time magazine who famously asked, "Is God Dead?" Elson posed the questions in a cover story for the April 8, 1966 issue of Time. For the first time in the magazine's 43-year history, the cover featured no photograph or illustration. Instead, the cover showed blood-red letters against a black background posing Elson's question, "Is God Dead?" The New York Times has called the cover "a signpost of the 1960s, testimony to the wrenching social changes transforming the United States."

Though Elson is most remembered for the "Is God Dead?" cover, it was one of many stories he wrote for the publication on the subject of religion. Indeed, he had written nine previous cover stories on religious issues for Time.

=== Reaction to the story ===
Elson's cover story provoked extensive discussion. The issue drew Time's biggest newsstand sales in more than 20 years. The publisher received 3,500 letters—the most in the magazine's history to that point. The Chicago Sun Times referred to it as "a debate that had shocked and confused millions of devout Americans." One syndicated columnist, Jim Bishop, responded angrily to the article, pointing out that a recent Harris Poll showed that 97% of all American claim to believe in God. Bishop suggested the editors at Time had an incorrect view of God: "I would guess that the editors think that, if God is still out there, He should alter His image a little, become a hipster, stop dragging His sandals and start snapping His fingers in a Go-Go world."

In a May 1966 address, the pastor of the National Presbyterian Church of Washington, D.C. disputed the "God is Dead" theory, saying advocating the theory were a small group that had plunged "into the depths of existential despair." The pastor further noted, "One is moved to ask whether the reporters were sufficiently well acquainted with the deceased as to be able to identify the corpse."

== Death ==
On September 7, 2009, Elson died at home in Manhattan. He was survived by his wife, the former Rosemary Knorr, and two daughters.
