= Klaas Hendrikse =

Dutch priest

Klaas Hendrikse (September 1, 1947, Groot-Ammers – June 26, 2018, Middelburg) was a Dutch minister of the Protestant Church in the Netherlands (PKN) who was known as de atheïstische dominee ('the atheist pastor').

== Life and career ==
Hendrikse grew up in a non-religious family in the Alblasserwaard; his father was a veterinary surgeon. He went to school in Gorinchem and studied at Nyenrode Business University (1968–1971) and Michigan State University (1971–1972). Between 1972 and 1983, he worked for Xerox. After becoming interested in religion, he studied theology at the Utrecht University between 1977 and 1983, before becoming a preacher.

He gained national attention as "the atheist pastor" after he stated in a number of newspapers, including Trouw and Volkskrant, that he did not believe in God's literal existence but as something that "happens". Hendrikse described God as "a word for experience, or human experience" and said that Jesus may have never existed. His comments caused outrage both within and outside of the Protestant Church in the Netherlands (PKN). Hendrikse later said that he did not consider himself to be an atheist, but tried to stay close to atheism in his choice of words and away from the "jargon of the church".

The PKN considered taking disciplinary action against Hendrikse, but dropped the case in 2009. PKN authorities stated that such a case would result in "a protracted discussion about the meanings of words that in the end will produce little clarity." Hendrikse said that he would "rather remain as a louse in the fur of the PKN" than leave and form his own religious community. Hendrikse's religious views were not considered extreme in a large part of the Netherlands; in the PKN and several other smaller denominations of the Netherlands, one in six clergy are either agnostic or atheist. Hendrikse died in 2018.

== Books ==
- Believing in a God that does not exist: the manifesto of an atheist pastor (2007)
- God does not exist and Jesus is his son (2011)

== See also ==
- Christian atheism
- Irreligion in the Netherlands
