= Robert T. Elson =

Robert T. Elson (1906–1987) was an American writer, editor, and executive for Time Inc.

== Background ==
Elson came from Lakewood, Ohio.

== Career ==
Elson worked for two decades as a Canadian newspaper reporter.

In 1943, he joined Time, Inc., and held a variety of editorial and executive positions at Time, Fortune and Life magazines.

In 1968, he published a corporate-approved history called Time Inc.: The Intimate History of a Publishing Enterprise, edited by Duncan Norton-Taylor.

He retired in 1969.

== Personal and death ==
Elson had two sons and three daughter, including Time writer John T. Elson.

He died age 80 of complications following a stroke on March 11, 1987, at Southampton Hospital on Long Island.

== Works ==
- Time Inc.: The Intimate History of a Publishing Enterprise (1968)
- Prelude to War (1976)

== See also ==
- Henry R. Luce
- Time-Life
