= Death of God theology =

Christian theological field of study

Death of God theology refers to a range of ideas by various theologians and philosophers that try to account for the rise of secularity and abandonment of traditional beliefs in God. They posit that God has either ceased to exist or in some way accounted for such a belief.

Although philosophers since Friedrich Nietzsche have occasionally used the phrase "God is dead" to reflect increasing unbelief in God, the concept rose to prominence in the late 1950s and 1960s, before waning again.

The Death of God movement is sometimes technically referred to as theothanatology, deriving from the Greek theos (God) and thanatos (death). The main proponents of this theology included the Christian theologians Gabriel Vahanian, Paul van Buren, Dorothee Sölle, William Hamilton, John Robinson, Thomas J. J. Altizer, Mark C. Taylor, John D. Caputo, Peter Rollins, and the rabbi Richard L. Rubenstein.

== History ==
=== William Blake ===
The theme of God's "death" became more explicit in the theosophism of the 18th- and 19th-century mystic William Blake. In his intricately engraved illuminated books, Blake sought to throw off the dogmatism of his contemporary Christianity and, guided by a lifetime of vivid visions, examine the dark, destructive and apocalyptic undercurrent of theology. Most notably, Blake refused to view the crucifixion of Jesus as a simple bodily death, and, rather, saw in this event a kenosis, a self-emptying of God. As Altizer writes, Blake "celebrates a cosmic and historical movement of the Godhead that culminates in the death of God himself".

=== 19th-century philosophy ===
In the 19th century, Death of God thought entered philosophical consciousness through the work of German philosopher Georg Wilhelm Friedrich Hegel. Drawing upon the mysticism of Jakob Böhme and the Idealism of Johann Gottlieb Fichte and Friedrich Wilhelm Joseph Schelling, Hegel sought to revise Immanuel Kant's Idealism through the introduction of a dialectical methodology. Adapting this dialectic to the chief theological problem, the nature of God, Hegel argued that God (as Absolute or Father) is radically negated by the concrete incarnation of God (as Christ or Son). This negation is subsequently itself negated at the crucifixion of Jesus, resulting in the emergence of the Holy Spirit, God as both concrete (the Church) and absolute (spiritual community). In Hegelian thought, therefore, the death of God does not result in a strict negativity, but rather, permits the emergence of the full revelation of God: Absolute Consciousness.

=== 20th-century philosophy and theology ===
Though he preceded the formal Death of God movement, the prominent 20th-century Protestant theologian Paul Tillich remains highly influential in the field. Drawing upon the work of Friedrich Nietzsche, Friedrich Schelling and Jakob Böhme, Tillich developed a notion of God as the "ground of Being" and the response to nihilism. Central to this notion was Tillich's rejection of traditional theism and insistence upon a "God above the God of theism". In The Courage to Be he writes:

The courage to take the anxiety of meaninglessness upon oneself is the boundary line up to which the courage to be can go. Beyond it is mere non-being. Within it all forms of courage are re-established in the power of the God above the God of theism. The courage to be is rooted in the God who appears when God has disappeared in the anxiety of doubt.

In 1961, Gabriel Vahanian's The Death of God was published. Vahanian argued that modern secular culture had lost all sense of the sacred, lacking any sacramental meaning, no transcendental purpose or sense of providence. He concluded that for the modern mind "God is dead". In Vahanian's vision a transformed post-Christian and post-modern culture was needed to create a renewed experience of deity.

Thomas J. J. Altizer offered a radical theology of the death of God that drew upon William Blake, Hegelian thought and Nietzschean ideas. He conceived of theology as a form of poetry in which the immanence (presence) of God could be encountered in faith communities. However, he no longer accepted the possibility of affirming belief in a transcendent God. Altizer concluded that God had incarnated in Christ and imparted his immanent spirit which remained in the world even though Jesus was dead. Unlike Nietzsche, Altizer believed that God truly died. He was considered to be the leading exponent of the Death of God movement.

Richard L. Rubenstein represented the radical edge of Jewish thought working through the impact of the Holocaust. In a technical sense he maintained, based on the Kabbalah, that God had "died" in creating the world. However, for modern Jewish culture he argued that the death of God occurred in Auschwitz. Although the literal death of God did not occur at this point, this was the moment in which humanity was awakened to the idea that a theistic God may not exist. In Rubenstein's work, it was no longer possible to believe in an orthodox/traditional theistic God of the Abrahamic covenant; rather, God is a historical process.

=== 21st century ===
Although the direct linkage between the Lacanian–Marxist critical theory of Slavoj Žižek and Death of God thought is not immediately apparent, his explicitly Hegelian reading of Christianity, defended most conspicuously in the 2009 The Monstrosity of Christ, strongly lends itself to this tradition. Strongly influenced by both Dietrich Bonhoeffer and G. K. Chesterton, Žižek advocates a variant of Christian atheism, more or less strongly depending upon context. As early as Adam Kotsko's 2008 Žižek and Theology a direct linkage between Žižek and this tradition has been maintained. Initially, reviewers vigorously rejected this connection, but following the publication of The Monstrosity of Christ as well as subsequent co-paneled sessions, the direct relation between Žižek and Thomas Altizer has become clear.

== Theology ==
=== Secularism ===
Vahanian, Van Buren, and Hamilton agree that the concept of transcendence had lost any meaningful place in modern thought. According to the norms of contemporary secular modern thought, God is dead. In responding to this collapse of transcendence, Vahanian proposes a radically post-Christian alternative to traditional theism. Van Buren and Hamilton offered secular people the option of Jesus as the model human who acted in love. The encounter with the Christ of faith would be open in a church community.

=== God's existence ===
To what extent God may properly be understood as "dead" is highly debated among Death of God theologians. In its strongest forms, God is said to have literally died, often as incarnated on the cross or at the moment of creation. Thomas J. J. Altizer remains the clearest proponent of this perspective. Weaker forms of this theological bent often interpret the "death of God" as meaning that God never existed, or that people today "do not experience God except, perhaps, as a hidden, silent, absent being."

== Time magazine cover ==
The cover of the April 8, 1966, edition of Time magazine asked the question "Is God Dead?", and the accompanying article addressed growing atheism in America at the time, as well as the growing popularity of Death of God theology.

== Reactions ==
Martin Luther King Jr. satirized Death of God theology in a sermon, saying, "A few theologians are trying to say that God is dead. And I've been asking them about it because it disturbs me to know that God died and I didn't have a chance to attend the funeral. They haven't been able to tell me yet the date of his death. They haven't been able to tell me yet who the coroner was that pronounced him dead."

== See also ==
- Atheism
- Christian atheism
- Christian theology
- Demythologization
- Deus otiosus
- God is dead
- Nemo contra Deum nisi Deus ipse
- Postchristianity
- Secular theology
