= Rod Rosenbladt =

American theologian (1942–2024)

Rod Rosenbladt (January 3, 1942 – February 2, 2024) was an American Lutheran theologian and academic who was Professor of Theology at Concordia University Irvine in California, and was also well known among Lutheran, Reformed, and Evangelical Christians as the co-host of the nationally syndicated radio program The White Horse Inn. Following that endeavor he had his own program as part of the 1517 project discussed below.

== Early life and education ==
Rod Rosenbladt was born on January 3, 1942, in the western part of the state of Washington and studied psychology in his undergraduate degree at Pacific Lutheran University, Tacoma, Washington, and graduated with the B.A. in 1964. He then studied theology at Evangelical Lutheran Theological Seminary in Columbus, Ohio, and graduated with a B.D. in 1968. He pursued post-graduate studies in the philosophy of religion at Trinity Evangelical Divinity School in Deerfield, Illinois, and graduated with an M.A. in 1972. He was taught there by John Warwick Montgomery, and since that time they were lifelong friends. On Montgomery's advice and recommendation, Rosenbladt proceeded to doctoral studies in theology at the University of Strasbourg, France, and graduated in 1978 with a Ph.D.

== Career ==
Rosenbladt was a Lutheran minister in the Lutheran Church – Missouri Synod and assumed pastoral positions in several parishes in California: Huntington Beach, Temple City, San Gabriel, and La Jolla. He lived in California since 1969 and held teaching posts in that state at the Graduate Theological Union in Berkeley (1973–1977) and at Westmont College in Santa Barbara (1973–1977). He was an adjunct member of faculty at Concordia University Irvine from 1979 to 1984, until receiving a permanent lecturer's position in which he taught theology starting in 1984.

During the 1980s, he served as an evening lecturer in the Master of Arts program in Christian apologetics at the Simon Greenleaf School of Law. The school had been founded by Montgomery. Rosenbladt taught philosophy of religion and systematic theology to the MA students, and supervised various students' dissertations. He left the school at the same time that Montgomery resigned from his position there.

Rosenbladt had on various occasions participated in formal public debates on theological and apologetic topics. He was also a frequent contributor to Modern Reformation magazine and a regular participant on The White Horse Inn radio program.

On the occasion of his sixty-fifth birthday, he was honored with a festschrift, Theologia et Apologia: Essays in Reformation Theology and its Defense Presented to Rod Rosenbladt.

In 2014 he helped launch 1517 The Legacy Project, a non-profit initiative built, in part, upon his own work, the work of Montgomery, and that of Martin Luther.

== Death ==
Rod Rosenbladt died on February 2, 2024, at the age of 82.

== Bibliography ==
- "The Gospel For Those Broken By The Church," Live presentation for South Orange County Outreach (2004).
- Christ Alone (Wheaton, IL: Crossway Books, 1999).
- "Reclaiming the Doctrine of Justification," Modern Reformation, Vol. 1 No. 6 (Nov/Dec 1992).
- "Are You Prepared to Give a Defense? A Crash-Course on Christian Apologetics," Modern Reformation, Vol. 2 No. 3 (May/June 1993).
- "Christ Died for the Sins of Christians Too," Modern Reformation, Vol. 12 No. 3 (May/June 2003).
- "Deprivation Within the Evangelical Family and Church," Wittenburg Door, number 13 (June/July 1973).
- "The Integrity of the Gospel Writers," in Christianity for the Tough-Minded, edited by John Warwick Montgomery (Minneapolis: Bethany Fellowship, 1973), pp. 237–243. ISBN 0-87123-076-3
- "Who Do TV Preachers Say That I Am?" in The Agony of Deceit, edited by Michael Horton (Chicago: Moody Press, 1990), pp. 107–120. ISBN 0-8024-8776-9.
- "What is Apologetics and How Is It Done?" Issues Etc. Journal, Volume 1, number 6 (April 1996)
