= Anne Hagopian =

American art historian

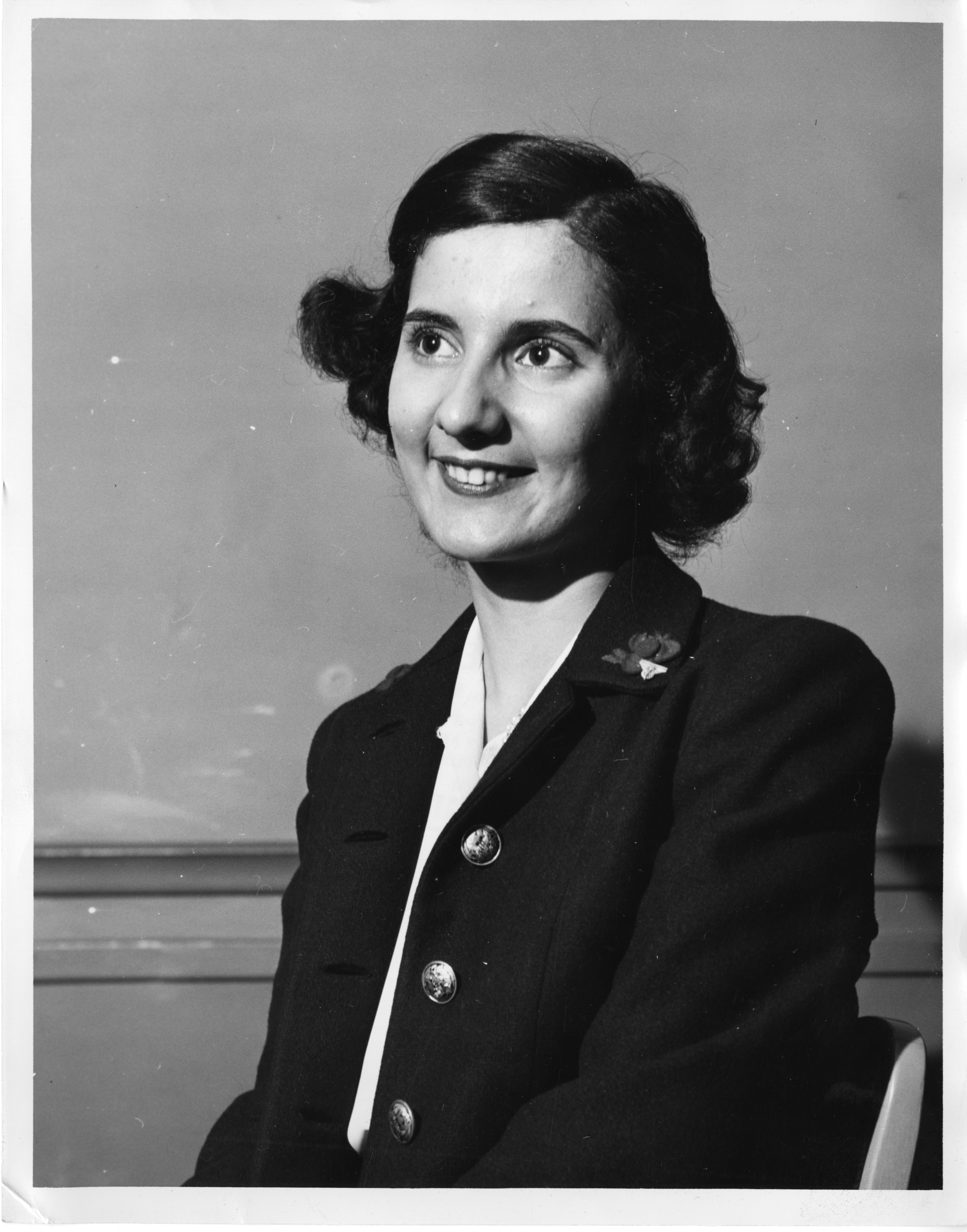
- Hagopian, c. 1944
- Born: Anne Rachel Hagopian; 1927; New York City, U.S.
- Died: 13 October 2008 (aged 80–81); New York City, U.S.
- Occupation: Art historian
- Spouse: Paul van Buren (m. 1948; died 1998)
- Children: 4
- Relatives: Van Buren family (by marriage)

Academic background
- Education: Radcliffe College (AB); Bryn Mawr College (PhD)

Anne Hagopian van Buren (1927 – October 13, 2008) was an art historian who studied 14th- and 15th-century Netherlandish art.

Hagopian's article "Reality and Literary Romance in the Park of Hesdin" explores the literary origins of motifs found in Robert d'Artois's garden at Hesdin. Hagopian wrote that "the imagery from French romances is realized at Hesdin".

== Early life and education ==
Van Buren was born Anne Rachel Hagopian in 1927 in New York City, the second of two children, to Vahan Hagopian (1889–1971), an architect and architectural designer, and Simone Hagopian (née Perrot; 1898–1973), into a family of Armenian and Swiss descent. She had an older brother, Aram Hagopian (1926–1926), who died young.

Her father was born in Cairo, Egypt, to Armenian parents. He emigrated to New York City in 1916, where he worked as an architectural delineator and designer, working for notable Manhattan projects alongside prominent architects like Emery Roth. Her mother was born into an affluent family from Geneva, Switzerland. Her grandfather, Gaston Perrot-Reveillod (1870–1949), was a noted Swiss chemist, engineer and industrialist. He founded Perrot Duval Holding as well as the Touring Club Suisse and the Automobile Club de Suisse.

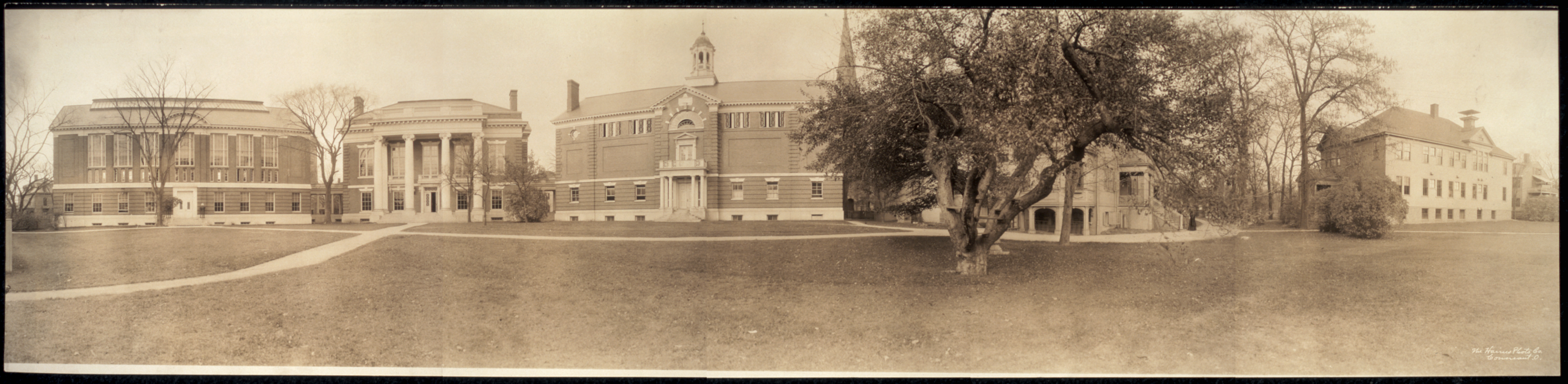
Radcliffe College

Anne's educational journey was characterized by its breadth and excellence. She received extensive training in astronomy, culminating in her achievement of top honors in the national science scholarship competition. This accolade granted her a scholarship worth $2,400, which facilitated her enrollment at Radcliffe College.

Subsequently, she seamlessly integrated her scientific expertise into the field of art history. After her time as a professor at Tufts University, she offered her help to outside programs. Following her departure from full-time teaching, Anne continued to contribute to academia by offering her expertise at prestigious institutions such as Brown University and the University of Amsterdam. Following the passing of her husband, she devoted more time to her pursuits in New York City. During this period, she delved into the study of dress depicted in medieval manuscripts, further enriching her scholarly repertoire.

== Career ==
She attended and graduated from Radcliffe College. As an undergraduate student, she did computing work at the Harvard College Observatory. She earned a Ph.D. in art history from Bryn Mawr College and taught at Tufts University from 1975 to 1984. She is remembered as a prominent expert in 14th and 15th Netherlandish art who proudly used her scientific training to enhance her art history research.

Hagopian's article "Reality and Literary Romance in the Park of Hesdin" explores the literary origins of motifs found in Robert d'Artois's garden at Hesdin. Hagopian wrote that "the imagery from French romances is realized at Hesdin".

== Personal life ==
In 1948, Hagopian married Paul van Buren (1924–1998), the son of Harold Sheffield Van Buren Jr. (1897–1983) and Charlotte Elizabeth Van Buren (née Matthews; 1898–1975). He was a theologian, author and descendant of the Van Buren family. His paternal grandfather, Harold Sheffield Van Buren Sr., served as U.S. consul to Nice. They had four children.

Van Buren passed away October 13, 2008 aged 80–81 in New York City.

== Selected publications ==
- van Buren, Anne Hagopian (1986). "Thoughts, Old and New, on the Sources of Early Netherlandish Painting". Simiolus: Netherlands Quarterly for the History of Art. 16 (2/3): 93–112. doi:10.2307/3780631. JSTOR 3780631.
- van Buren, Anne Hagopian (2011). Illuminating Fashion: Dress in the Art of Medieval France and the Netherlands, 1325-1515. New York : The Morgan Library & Museum.
