= Trinity Law School =

American law school

Coordinates: 33°45′56″N 117°51′07″W

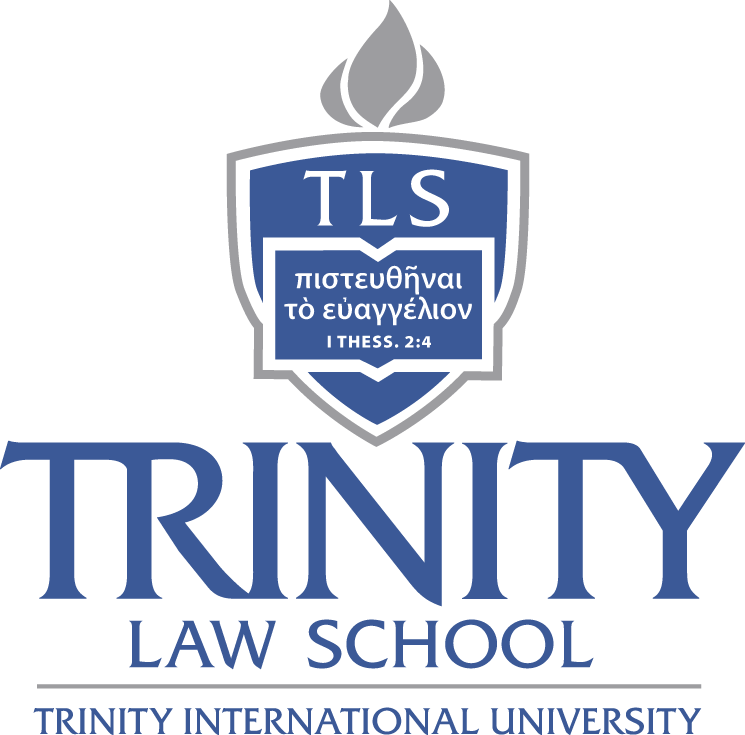
- Parent school: Trinity International University
- Established: 1980
- School type: Private university
- Dean: Eric Halvorson
- Location: Santa Ana, California, United States
- Faculty: 7 full-time; 68 adjunct
- Bar pass rate: 18% (3/17) (July 2023 1st time takers)
- Website: www.tiu.edu/law

Trinity Law School is the law school of Trinity International University, which is an evangelical Christian university in Bannockburn, Illinois. Trinity Law School is accredited by the Higher Learning Commission (as part of Trinity International University) and approved by the State Bar of California. It is not accredited by the American Bar Association (ABA). The school offers a Juris Doctor (JD) program on campus or online, and an online Master of Legal Studies (MLS) program.

== History ==
Trinity Law School was founded in 1980 as the Simon Greenleaf School of Law. It was originally located at Calvary Chapel Costa Mesa, in Santa Ana, California. In 1982, it relocated to Anaheim, California. In 1997, it relocated to its current location at 2200 N. Grand Ave. in Santa Ana. It was named in honor of the nineteenth century Harvard law professor, Simon Greenleaf, who was an authority on the laws of evidence.

The Simon Greenleaf School of Law was cofounded by John Warwick Montgomery. In 1980, the founding board of trustees collaborated with Montgomery to establish the Simon Greenleaf School of Law. It commenced operations by offering classes for the JD degree as well as a Bachelor of Science in Law (BSL). Additionally, a one-and-a-half year post-graduate course in Christian Apologetics and International Human Rights was offered that led to the conferral of a Master of Arts degree.

In 1997, the law school became a part of Trinity International University (TIU), headquartered in Deerfield, Illinois.

== Accreditation and curricula ==
Trinity Law School is one of 20 law schools to be approved by the Committee of Bar Examiners of the State Bar of California. It became regionally accredited by the Higher Learning Commission of the North Central Association accreditation when it joined Trinity International University in 1997. Trinity Law School is not accredited by the American Bar Association (ABA).

In July 2023, 18% of Trinity graduates taking the California bar exam for the first time passed, compared to an overall pass rate of 64% among first-time takers.

== Notable people ==
Notable founding members of the faculty teaching in the defunct Master of Arts program included Harold Lindsell, Walter Martin, Josh McDowell, and Rod Rosenbladt.

The first dean of the law school during the transition from Simon Greenleaf University to Trinity International University was Shannon "Verleur" Spann (a 1990s graduate of Simon Greenleaf Law School), whose husband, Johnny Micheal Spann (a CIA paramilitary operations officer), was the first American killed in Afghanistan during Operation Enduring Freedom.
