= Pandemic! =

Book by Slavoj Žižek

Pandemic! COVID-19 Shakes the World
- First edition
- Author: Slavoj Žižek
- Language: English
- Publisher: Polity
- Publication date: 24 March 2020

Pandemic! COVID-19 Shakes the World is a 2020 book by the Slovenian philosopher Slavoj Žižek. In this book, he posits that in order to avoid further global catastrophe due to coronavirus disease 2019, the world would need to implement a "new form of ... communism", loosely defined as the construction of a "global organisation that can control and regulate the economy" along with a "global healthcare network", both marked by a general shift away from "market mechanisms". Žižek insists that "we should resist the temptation to treat the ongoing epidemic as something that has a deeper meaning".

Yohann Koshy of The Guardian wrote that "Žižek has spent his career writing in anticipation of a world-historic moment like the coronavirus pandemic, a truly totalising event that would allow the Hegelian philosopher – Hegel's being a totalising philosophy – to deploy his skills on the frontline. But this first attempt from our philosophical key-worker is forgettable." Žižek takes the pandemic to be not only an invitation to a new form of global political organisation but as a call to rethink philosophy itself. The revolutionary nature of an event like a pandemic is not merely practical but inherently theoretical as, in his own words, "we will have to experience a true philosophical revolution".
