= Thorkild Grosbøll =

Danish clergy (1948–2020)

- Born: 27 February 1948
- Died: 10 May 2020 (aged 72)
- Known for: Public statement of disbelief in an interventionist creator God, while being a priest

Thorkild Grosbøll (27 February 1948 – 10 May 2020) was a parish priest in the Church of Denmark. In the early 2000s he received a lot of media attention in Denmark for publicly stating disbelief in an interventionist creator God. He died on 10 May 2020 after a short illness.

== Early career ==
After various other services, Grosbøll became parish priest in Taarbæk June 1991.

== Statement and controversy ==
In the spring of 2003, Thorkild Grosbøll published the book En Sten i Skoen (A Stone in the Shoe), resulting in very limited reactions, though he wrote in it that he does not believe in God. On 23 May 2003, the Danish newspaper Weekendavisen published an interview with Grosbøll, in which he repeated statements from his book, in particular that he does not believe in a creating or upholding God.

After a public outcry, the bishop in Elsinore, Lise-Lotte Rebel, started talks with the priest on 3 June 2003 about his faith. Simultaneously, she relieved him of his duties as parish priest in Taarbæk as she believed Grosbøll had failed on four accounts:

- neglected the creed of the Church of Denmark
- subverted the respectability of the service
- ignored orders
- created profound confusion about the Church of Denmark.

On 23 July 2003, Thorkild Grosbøll was allowed to continue his service as a parish priest in Taarbæk, subject to special supervision by the bishop.

On 3 June 2004, Grosbøll was instructed to resign no later than June 4, or he would be suspended. On 7 June 2004, the chairman of the elected parish council in Taarbæk, Lars Heilesen, informed the parish about the situation in the church in Taarbæk. On 10 June 2004, Rebel again relieved Thorkild Grosbøll of his duties.

During all these events, the parish community in Taarbæk stood by Thorkild Grosbøll. There was an animated public debate, occasionally fuelled by statements from Grosbøll like: "God belongs in the past. He is actually so old fashioned that I am baffled by modern people believing in his existence. I am thoroughly fed up with empty words about miracles and eternal life." At the same time he maintained that the bishop and the press misunderstood him, taking quotes from his sermons out of context.

On 12 July 2004 the Ministry of Ecclesiastical Affairs transferred the case to an ecclesiastical court. The first stage of this process, a hearing of the involved parties, was concluded February 2005. On 11 May 2005, the ministry relieved bishop Rebel from her supervision of Thorkild Grosbøll, and transferred the supervision to the bishop in Roskilde, Jan Lindhardt. Thereby the ministry put the ecclesiastical court case on hold. On 20 May 2006 Grosbøll confirmed his priestly vows before Lindhardt in the presence of witnesses and by his signature, and was allowed to serve again as parish priest, but was instructed not to talk to the press.

Thus the case was put to rest till autumn 2007, where it was decided that the supervision was to be transferred to the bishop in Århus, Kjeld Holm, by 1 May 2008, when Lindhardt would retire. As announced shortly after this decision, Grosbøll retired early when he turned 60 in February 2008.
