= Peter Rollins =

Northern Irish writer (born 1973)

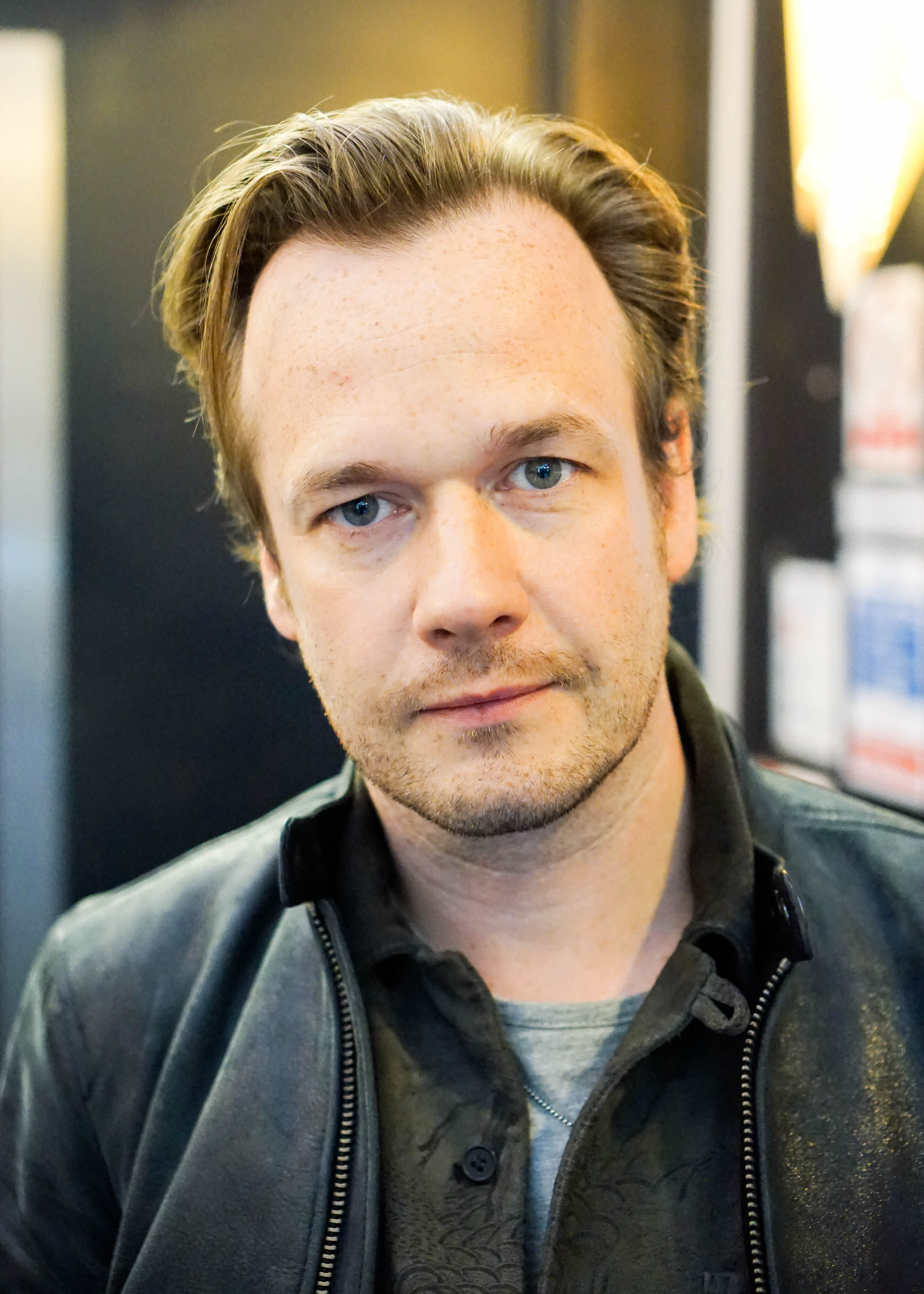
- Rollins in 2015
- Born: 31 March 1973 (age 53); Belfast, Northern Ireland

Philosophical work
- Era: Contemporary philosophy
- Region: Western philosophy
- School: Continental philosophy; Postmodern philosophy; Postmodern Christianity; Post-structuralist psychoanalysis; Phenomenology; Existentialism; Apophatic theology; Death of God theology
- Main interests: Theology
- Notable ideas: Pyrotheology; Transformance art Suspended space

Peter Rollins (born 31 March 1973) is a Northern Irish writer, public speaker, philosopher, producer and theologian.

Drawing largely from various strands of continental philosophy, Rollins' early work operated broadly from within the tradition of apophatic theology, while his more recent books have signalled a move toward the theory and practice of death of God theology. In these books Rollins develops a "religionless" interpretation of Christianity called pyrotheology, an interpretation that views faith as a particular way of engaging with the world rather than a set of beliefs about the world.

In contrast to the dominant reading of Christianity, this more existential approach argues that faith has nothing to do with upholding a religious identity, affirming a particular set of beliefs or gaining wholeness through conversion. Instead he has developed an approach that sees Christianity as a critique of these very things. This anti-religious reading stands against the actual existing church and lays the groundwork for an understanding of faith as a type of life in which one is able to celebrate doubt, ambiguity and complexity while deepening care and concern for the world. He argues that the event which gave rise to the Christian tradition cannot itself be reduced to a tradition, but is rather a way of challenging traditions.

In order to explore and promote these themes Rollins has founded a number of experimental communities such as ikon and ikonNYC. These groups describe themselves as iconic, apocalyptic, heretical, emerging and failing and engage in the performance of what they call 'transformance art' and the creation of "suspended space." Because of their rejection of "worldview Christianity" and embrace of suspended space, these groups purposefully attempt to attract people with different political perspectives and opposing views concerning the existence of God and the nature of the world.

Although Rollins does not directly identify with the emerging church movement, he has been a significant influence on the movement's development.

== Early life and education ==
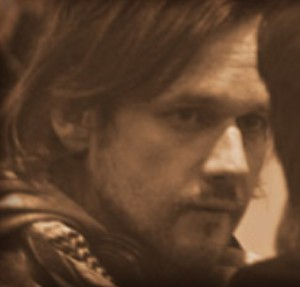
Peter Rollins in Belfast, 2007

Rollins grew up in East Belfast during the Troubles, a period of intense and violent sectarian conflict that erupted in Northern Ireland in the late 1960s and resulted in the deaths of more than 3,600 people before the signing of the Good Friday Agreement on 10 April 1998, which is generally regarded as the end of the conflict, though pockets of violence persist today. He attended Orangefield Boys High School and left at the age of sixteen without the qualifications required for further study. He was unemployed for several years before taking a job as a youth worker in Carrickfergus and working in a homeless shelter run by the Simon Community on the Falls Road, Belfast. He then went on to an access course on the Castlereagh Campus of the Belfast Metropolitan College (an intensive one-year course designed for disadvantaged students who wish to attend university but lack the entry requirements). Rollins has a Bachelor of Arts degree with honours in scholastic philosophy, a Master of Arts degree in political theory and social criticism, and a Doctor of Philosophy (PhD) degree dealing with post-structural theory from Queen's University, Belfast.

Academics such as Cathy Higgins have explored how an understanding of Rollins' activism requires an appreciation of The Troubles. The development of groups like the Belfast-based ikon collective was at least partially a response to the pervasive atmosphere of violence, economic hardship, rigid identity markers and deep rooted sectarianism in operation in the province. The sectarian violence combined with the use of religion to legitimize injustice, the fundamentalism of many Protestant churches and the sexual abuse scandals of the Catholic Church, played a major role in creating the frame of reference from which Rollins works. The result being an emphasis on creating practices designed so that "participants [could] set aside the various identities that define them" and gather as a gathering of equals to "share stories, struggles, and rituals that help them respond to one another in a Christ-like way." In contrast to a dogmatic form of religion and she notes that ikon provided a space in which "doubt is viewed as healthy and necessary for owning our material reality, vulnerability and limitedness".

== Career ==
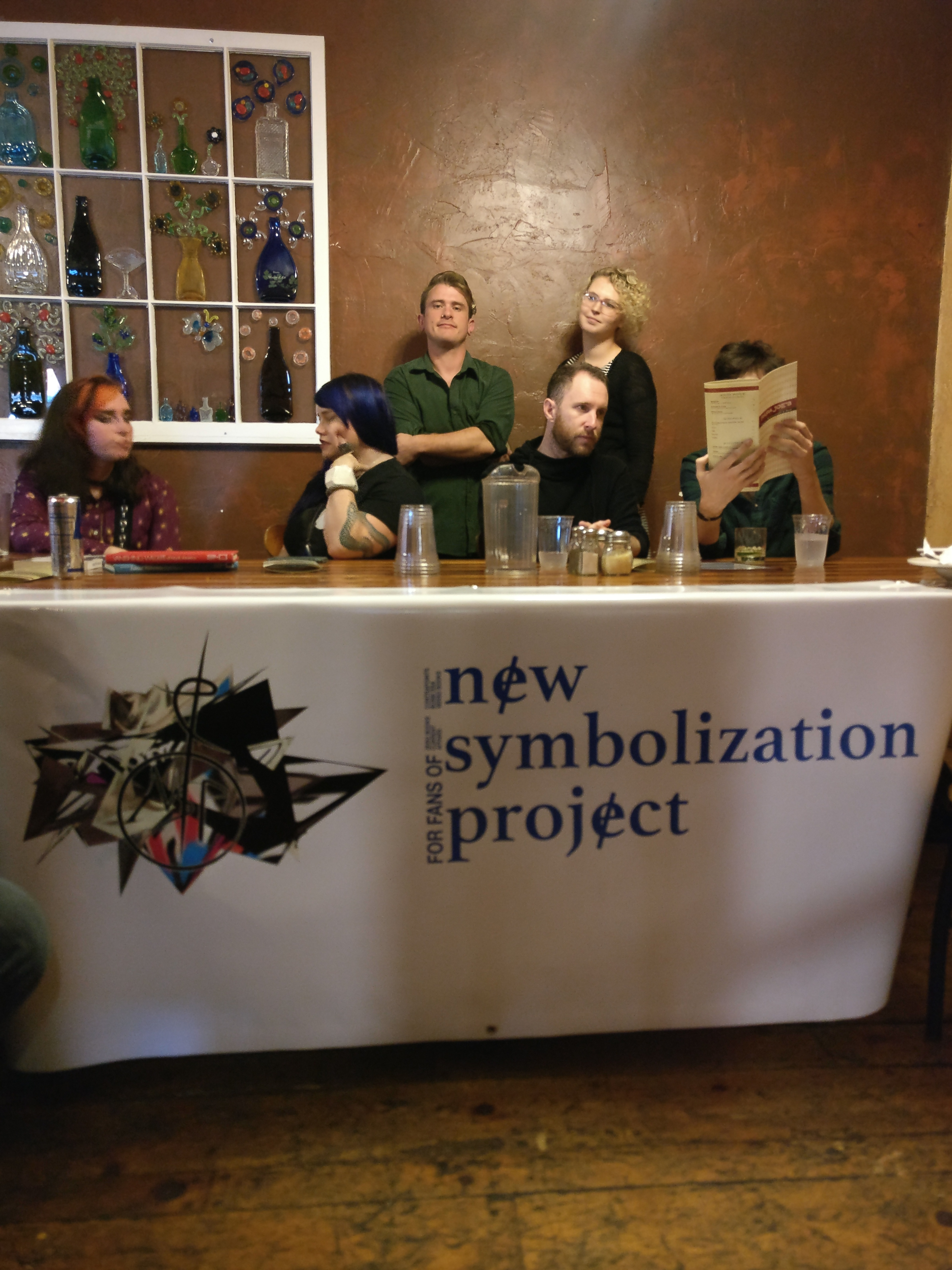
New Symbolization Project, a critical theory club at Boise State University, held the first sustained, multi-disciplinary academic response to the Jordan Peterson phenomenon in late October 2018; notable Marxist economist Richard D. Wolff and Rollins gave the keynotes.

While operating broadly outside the academy Rollins does work with various academic institutions across the UK. He has been a research associate with the Irish School of Ecumenics (Trinity College, Dublin) and is currently on faculty at the Global Center for Advanced Studies.

== Early writing ==
Rollins' unpublished PhD (His Colour is Our Blood: A Phenomenology of the Prodigal Father) offers a survey of religious thinking in the aftermath of Marx, Freud, and Nietzsche. It engages directly with Martin Heidegger's critique of onto-theology and explores the religious significance of Jacques Derrida's post-structural theory and Jean-Luc Marion's saturated phenomenology (drawing out the points of connection and conflict between them). This manuscript represents Rollins' initial attempt to articulate an approach to faith that would short-circuit the categories of theism and atheism and problematize the various debates that arise from them. In so doing this marks an approach to Christianity that is not related to a system of belief but rather to a particular mode of life.

His first book, How (Not) to Speak of God (2006) popularized the main themes of his PhD by blending the apophatic work of Meister Eckhart and pseudo-Dionysius with the Post-structural work of Derrida and Marion. How (Not) to Speak of God also outlined how the theory was developed and worked out in a concrete way through the ikon collective (the second half of the book outlined a series of 'transformance art' liturgical experiments).

While his early work is marked by themes that continue to play a central role in his later development (such as doubt, complexity and ambiguity), they remain largely within a specifically theistic and mystical register.

== Shift to radical theology ==
The Fidelity of Betrayal (2008) signalled a movement from apophatic and post-structural discussions witnessed in his PhD and How (Not) to Speak of God into Radical Theology. With this work we begin to see a critique of purely theistic forms of faith and witness the growing influence of political philosopher Slavoj Žižek and psychoanalyst Jacques Lacan in his overall project. The Fidelity of Betrayal is thus a work that bridges the more mystical influence of his first writings toward a theological materialism, a trajectory that was subsequently fleshed out and deepened in Insurrection (2011) and The Idolatry of God (2013). In these later books the influence of Hegel, Žižek, Lacan, later Bonhoeffer and Tillich comes to the fore, though John Caputo remains as an ongoing point of reference.

== Story-telling ==
Rollins incorporates narrative forms into his talks to create a more informal style of communication. In 2009 Rollins published The Orthodox Heretic, a book of 33 short, parable-like stories. He has also written fairytales and a play that became the basis of a short film he produced, called Making Love.

== Current thinking ==
Rollins' overall project is marked by the themes of doubt, complexity, unknowing and embracing brokenness. More than this, he has been interested in showing that these themes are central to the founding event of Christianity. He is interested in showing how the central scandal of Christianity offers us a critique of religion (including the need to believe) and tribal identity, both of which have been lost in the actually existing church; an institution that he argues represents a fundamental betrayal of the insurrectionary power of faith. His work is an attempt to show that Christianity does not rest on theistic belief, some commitment to supernaturalism or the affirmation of some set of dogmas. Rollins has named his theological program pyrotheology. The name was inspired by the Spanish anarchist Buenaventura Durruti's statement that "the only church that illuminates is a burning church." The phrase has also inspired some of Slavoj Žižek's work related to radical theology.

Rollins' work operates at the intersection of where Post-Structuralism, Psychoanalysis, Phenomenology, and Existentialism meet and inform each other. What follow are some of the major themes evidenced in his project:

1. Humans have a natural and destructive disposition toward the pursuit of satisfaction: By employing insights developed by psychoanalysis, Rollins argues that humans tend to seek some object that would seem to promise satisfaction. This very pursuit is, however, itself destructive, for we either don't get what we seek above all else and thus always long for it, or we do get it and discover that it is actually unable to offer us what we sought.
2. Humans have a natural and destructive disposition to seek out certainty: Employing the insights of childhood development in the area of metapsychology Rollins argues that, as children, we identify with false images that help us to cover over our weakness and dependence on others. Rollins claims that adults often remain caught within these false images. Our various beliefs offer us a certain level or security and sense of belonging. But he argues that they ultimately damage us by distancing us from others, causing us to repress doubt and preventing us from being positively impacted by people who think and practice in ways that are different from our own.
3. Religion falsely promises to offer the certainty and satisfaction that we seek: While certainty and satisfaction are being offered to us from multiple sources, Rollins argues that the church offers the paradigmatic version of this pursuit. God is offered as that which will give us satisfaction and a certainty not available elsewhere. He argues that anything we believe offers this type of happiness and confidence is actually nothing but an idol that offers, ironically, the opposite: dissatisfaction and uncertainty.
4. The Liberal and Progressive forms of Church are structurally similar to Conservative and Fundamentalist Church: While Conservative and Fundamentalist churches can be seen to fall into the problems Rollins outlines, his main concern lies with Liberal and Progressive communities. He argues that Liberal and Progressive churches verbally advocate doubt, complexity, ambiguity and brokenness, yet generally enact an idolatrous view of faith in their liturgical structures.
5. Faith is not a system that offers certainty and satisfaction but is a mode of living free from these drives.

== Projects ==
Rollins's project involves attempting to encourage a constant rupturing of ideological forms of Christianity through the development of non-dogmatic collectives that embrace doubt, complexity and ambiguity, open themselves up to critique, and face up to the human experience of lack. He has stated that these communities have a structural similarity to twelve step programs insofar as they involve facing up to one's issues and working them through in communities where grace and acceptance are fundamental principles. Psychoanalytic ideas, particularly from the school of Lacan, play a fundamental role. Rollins has developed a number of "contemplative practices" that are designed to help in this process.

For many years, Rollins has co-hosted a podcast with the comedian Elliott Morgan called The Fundamentalists.

== Public speaking ==
As a public speaker and storyteller Rollins has been involved in various tours (often in collaboration with musicians and artists). These include How (Not) to Speak of God (2006), Beyond Belief (2008), Lessons in Evandalism (2008), Insurrection (2009), Building on Fire (2013), and Playing with Fire (2014). In addition to this Rollins curates an annual three-day festival event in Belfast exploring the theory and practice of pyrotheology.

== Bibliography ==
- How (Not) To Speak of God (Paraclete/SPCK, 2006). The book aimed to re-envisage faith in the postmodern world, focusing on provisionality, fragility and fragmentation. The book became influential among emergent evangelical Christians soon after its publication.
- The Fidelity of Betrayal: Towards a Church beyond Belief (Paraclete/SPCK 2008)
- The Orthodox Heretic and Other Impossible Tales (Paraclete/SCM, April 2009)
- Insurrection: To Believe is Human; to Doubt, Divine (Howard/Hodder and Stoughton, October 2011)
- The Idolatry of God: Breaking Our Addiction to Certainty and Satisfaction (Howard/Hodder and Stoughton, January 2013)
- The Divine Magician: The Disappearance of Religion and the Discovery of Faith (Howard/Hodder and Stoughton, January 2015)
- Enduring Love: Tales of Tortuous Desire from the Lonely Forest (September 2018)
- Producer and co-writer of Making Love (Magician's Niece, released December 2018). Based on an original script by Peter Rollins called The Gallows
- Producer of Extimacy: An Assent into Hell (Magician's Niece, June 2020)
- Producer of Outopia: A Descent into Heaven (Magician's Niece, June 2020)
- Producer of Allone (Magician's Niece, April 2020)
- Producer of Jamaica (Magician's Niece, original release 2015, re-edit October 2020)
- Co-writer and Producer of A Guide to Making Love (Magician's Niece, In production)
