= The Death of God =

1961 book by Gabriel Vahanian

The Death of God: The Culture of our Post-Christian Era
- First edition (publ. George Braziller)
- Author: Gabriel Vahanian
- Published: 1961
- ISBN: 9780807603604

The Death of God is a 1961 book by Gabriel Vahanian, a part of the discussion of death of God theology during the period.

== Contents ==
In the book, Vahanian observes that many people in his era regarded the Christian God to be irrelevant to their situation. He describes that Christianity, and particularly theism, was not resonating with people. One explanation given for this is that the Christian God is too transcendent, whereas people in his day were largely focused on the practical worldly goals.

The book describes the process of secularization, namely, how society has steadily removed God from its institutions. Vahanian contends that the apparent religiosity of the 1950s obscures many from recognizing this process.

The book criticized efforts to modernize Christianity, such as Norman Vincent Peale's 1952 best-seller, The Power of Positive Thinking, which Vahanian asserted reduced Christianity to "a tool for success." Instead, Vahanian argued that faith was for coping with suffering, developing the conscience, and confronting doubts about God. The book claimed that Peale and Billy Graham had "domesticated" Christianity and its God.

The book includes a religious critique of existentialism.
