= San Manuel Bueno, Mártir =

Novel by Miguel de Unamuno

San Manuel Bueno, mártir
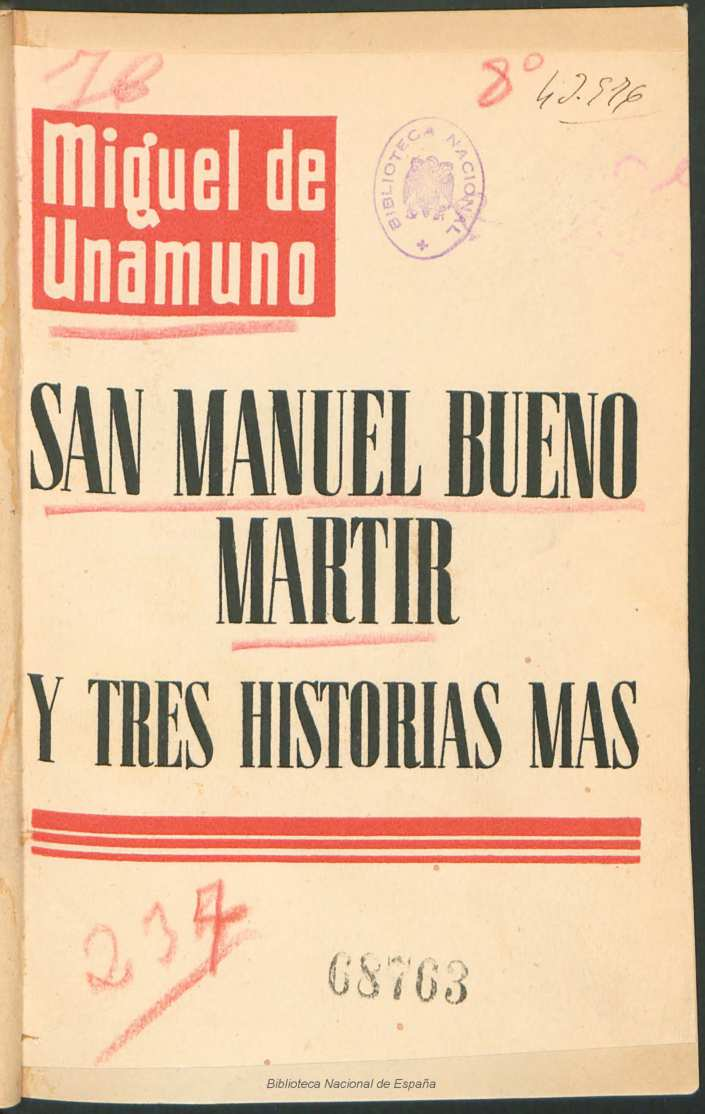
- Title page of the 1933 edition
- Author: Miguel de Unamuno
- Original title: San Manuel Bueno, mártir
- Language: Spanish
- Genre: Novel
- Publication place: Spain

San Manuel Bueno, mártir (1931) is a short novel by Miguel de Unamuno (1864–1936). It experiments with changes of narrator as well as minimalism of action and of description, and as such has been described as a nivola, a literary genre invented by Unamuno to describe his work. Its plot centers on the life of a parish priest in a small Spanish village. It was written in a period of two months at the end of 1930 along with two other stories, and was included on the Index Librorum Prohibitorum. The possibility that they may form a trilogy in three significant parts, or "partos" (births) as Unamuno suggested in the Prologue to the 1933 edition, has only recently been considered.

== Setting ==
The events of the novel occur in Valverde de Lucerna, a small village located on the edge of an idyllic lake. Legend tells that submerged beneath that lake exists a hidden city. The physical village and the legendary city serve as symbols of the spiritual and the material.

Both the mountain and lake acquire a human dimension in the character of Don Manuel, evidenced in the quote "Ya toda ella era don Manuel, don Manuel con el lago y la montaña" ("now everything was don Manuel, don Manuel with the lake and the mountain"). The mountain and lake have also been interpreted as symbolizing powerful faith and superficial faith, respectively, due to the frequent appearance of the mountain's reflection in the lake. This reflection does not penetrate the surface of the lake.

The fictional location in San Manuel Bueno, mártir was perhaps inspired by a real place, as suggested by the real-life lake San Martín de Castañeda, in Sanabria, at the foot of the ruins of a convent to St. Bernard where to this day lives a legend of a submerged city (Valverde de Lucerna) sleeping at the bottom of the lake.

== Plot ==
The novel tells the story of the local Catholic priest (Don Manuel) in fictional Valverde de Lucerna, Spain as told through the eyes of Angela, one of the townspeople. Throughout the course of the story Manuel is adored by the people of the town. He is constantly in the service of the townspeople. He refrains from condemning anyone and goes out of his way to help those whom the people have marginalized. Instead of refusing to allow the holy burial of someone who committed suicide, Don Manuel explains that he is sure that in the last moment, the person would have repented for their sin. Also, instead of excommunicating a woman who had an illegitimate child, as the Catholic Church would have done, Don Manuel arranges a marriage between the woman and her ex-boyfriend, so that order will return to the town, and the child will have a father figure. The people of the town consider him their "Saint" because of all of the good deeds he does.

Angela, after a brief stint away for education, returns to the town to live with her mother where she continues to be amazed at Manuel's devotion.

Lazarus, Angela's brother, later returns from the New World, disgusted with the mental and physical poverty he finds in the town. He too is amazed at Manuel's devotion but believes that "He is too intelligent to believe everything he teaches." It is clear that Lazarus does not have a sense of faith. Angela's and Lazarus's mother passes away. On her death bed she makes Lazarus promise to pray for her—he swears he will. Her dying wish is that Manuel can convert him. Lazarus begins following Don Manuel "to the lake" where Manuel is known to walk and think. Time passes and Lazarus takes Communion—to the townspeople, he appears to be converted. In reality, Lazarus is only praying for his mother's sake because it was her wish, not because he has faith.

Immediately following the Communion, Lazarus sits down with Angela and tells her that he has something he must tell her: both Manuel and Lazarus have no faith in God, specifically no belief in an afterlife. Angela is upset and incredulous but confronts Manuel about what Lazarus has said. In their conversation it becomes obvious that what Lazarus has said is accurate. Manuel believes that religion and the preaching of religion is the only way for the people to live contentedly—Lazarus through their talks had come to admire Manuel's determination to do what he thought was right despite his lack of belief in the veracity of what he taught. To that end, Lazarus felt it best to continue in the same way by returning to the fold. Although Angela questions the goodness of such a deed, Lazarus insists that Don Manuel is a saint for the things he has done all his life for the town.

Manuel grows increasingly weak. He is unable to bear the weight of teaching the resurrection when he does not believe it is real. He falls further and further into a depression, which the townspeople see as a reflection of Christ in their local priest. When Manuel dies he chooses to do so in public in the center of the town, and the people see him as their "second Christ." Lazarus takes on Manuel's role until his own death. Angela moves out of town. However, she finishes her narration by positing that perhaps it was God's will all along that both Manuel and Lazarus believe themselves to be non-believers, since it helped them to do good in the world. Angela expresses the belief that right before Manuel and Lazarus died, "the blindfold might have fallen from their eyes." The final chapter explains that Manuel is being considered for beatification and that he is being held up as the ideal and exemplar priest.

== See also ==
- Generation of 1898
- Spanish literature
