= Paul van Buren =

American philosopher

- Born: April 20, 1924; Norfolk, Virginia
- Died: June 18, 1998 (aged 74); Memorial Hospital, Blue Hill, Maine
- Education: Harvard College, Episcopal Theological School, University of Basel
- Occupations: Theologian; Author
- Spouse: Anne Hagopian
- Writing career
- Movement: Death of God theology (disavowed)

Paul Matthews van Buren (April 20, 1924 – June 18, 1998) was a Christian theologian and author. An ordained Episcopal priest, he was a professor of religion at Temple University, Philadelphia for 22 years. He was a Director [NYT obituary says "Associate"] of the Center of Ethics and Religious Pluralism at the Shalom Hartman Institute in Jerusalem.

He died of cancer on June 18, 1998, at age 74.

== Early life ==
Van Buren was born and raised in Norfolk, Virginia. During World War II, he had served in the United States Coast Guard.

== Career ==
Van Buren attended Harvard College, from which he graduated with a bachelor's degree in government, in 1948. He then attended the Episcopal Theological School, and received a bachelor's in sacred theology in 1951. It was after this that he was ordained as an Episcopal priest in the Diocese of Massachusetts. He received a Th.D. in theology in 1957 from the University of Basel in Switzerland studying under Karl Barth. A professor at Temple University, he was considered a leader of the "Death of God" school or movement, although he himself rejected that name for the movement as a "journalistic invention," and considered himself an exponent of "Secular Christianity."

Later, however, Van Buren expressed criticism of the approach that he and others had taken to accommodate the Christian faith to an increasingly secular culture. Writing in 1980, Van Buren stated:

When our cultural two-dimentionality is taken uncritically as normative (as in my The Secular Meaning of the Gospel, 1963), however, when the patterns of our culture are glorified in as though they were themselves the norms of the Way (as in Harvey Cox's The Secular City, 1965), when indeed the faith of our secular culture is taken to be essentially identical with our own (as in David Tracy's Blessed Rage for Order, 1975), we have surely reached the point of unhappy confusion. […] We have better things to say to this world than merely to echo back what it is saying without us. By this move of secularization, we fail utterly to fulfill our responsibility to the world for the very sake of which we have been called into a Way that is not that of the world.

== Works ==
Below is an incomplete list of his works:

- The Secular Meaning of the Gospel: Based on an Analysis of Its Language
- A Theology of the Jewish-Christian Reality (3 Volumes.)
- The Edges of Language:An Essay in the Logic of a Religion
- The Burden of Freedom
- Theological Explorations
- Christ in Our Place: The Substitutionary Character of Calvin's Doctrine of Reconciliation

== See also ==
- American philosophy
- List of American philosophers
