= Holocaust studies =

Study of the Holocaust

Holocaust studies, or sometimes Holocaust research, is a scholarly discipline that encompasses the historical research and study of the Holocaust. Institutions dedicated to Holocaust research investigate the multidisciplinary and interdisciplinary aspects of Holocaust methodology, demography, sociology, and psychology. It also covers the study of Nazi Germany, World War II, Jewish history, antisemitism, religion, Christian-Jewish relations, Holocaust theology, ethics, social responsibility, and genocide on a global scale. Exploring trauma, memories, and testimonies of the experiences of Holocaust survivors, human rights, international relations, Jewish life, Judaism, and Jewish identity in the post-Holocaust world are also covered in this type of research.

== Debates in the field ==
The field of Holocaust studies has seen many debates, some acrimonious, such as the Holocaust uniqueness debate, functionalism–intentionalism debate, and debates over perpetrator-focused versus victim-focused research.

During the Gaza war, the field found itself in a state of crisis. While some Holocaust researchers suggested a continuity between the 7 October attacks and the Holocaust, others expressed concerns about the mass violence committed by Israelis in the form of the Gaza genocide. Political scientist Ernesto Verdeja writes that "the crisis reflects more profound normative disagreements over who is a legitimate victim worth grieving, how and when – if at all – mass violence can be justified, and over the (exceptional) moral status of the state of Israel".

== Academic research ==
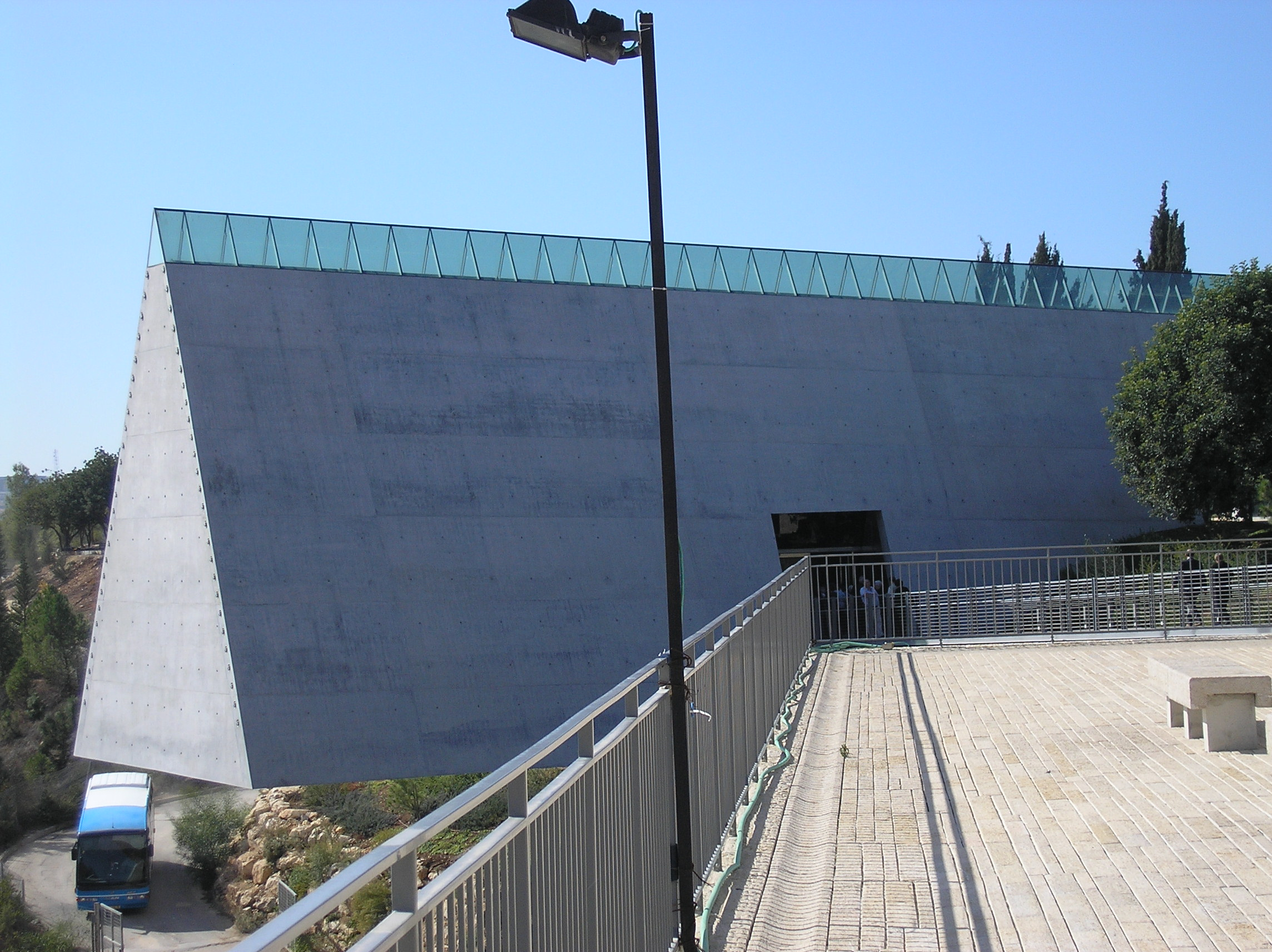
Yad Vashem Holocaust Museum

Among the research institutions and academic programs specializing in Holocaust research are:

- Center for Advanced Holocaust Studies at the United States Holocaust Memorial Museum in Washington, D.C.
- Center for Holocaust and Genocide Studies, University of Minnesota
- Center for Holocaust Studies and Human Rights at Gratz College: Largest doctoral program in Holocaust and genocide studies
- European Holocaust Research Infrastructure – it is financed by the 7th Framework Programme for Research and Technological Development of the European Union
- Fritz Bauer Institute in Frankfurt, Germany, named after the German judge and prosecutor at the Frankfurt Auschwitz trials (Fritz Bauer)
- The Sam and Frances Fried Holocaust and Genocide Academy at the University of Nebraska at Omaha
- Holocaust and Genocide Studies (journal), Oxford Academic.
- International Institute for Holocaust Research at Yad Vashem in Jerusalem, Israel
- Polish Center for Holocaust Research at the Polish Academy of Sciences in Warsaw, Poland
- Stockton University offered the first Master of Arts in Holocaust and genocide degree in the United States in 1999
- Uppsala Programme for Holocaust and Genocide Studies in Uppsala, Sweden
- Vienna Wiesenthal Institute for Holocaust Studies

== Scholars ==
Prominent Holocaust scholars include:

- H. G. Adler (1910–1988), Czech-English Jew who survived the Holocaust and became one of the early scholars of the Holocaust.
- Hannah Arendt (1906–1975), German-American political theorist who is known for the term "banality of evil", used to describe Adolf Eichmann.
- Harold Marcuse (born 1957), American born historian of German history who is a professor of History at the University of California Santa Barbara and is best known for his work Legacies of Dachau: The Uses and Abuses of a Concentration Camp, 1933–2001.
- Yehuda Bauer (1926–2024), Czech-born Israeli historian and scholar on the Holocaust and antisemitism.
- Doris Bergen (born 1960), Canadian academic and Holocaust historian.
- Michael Berenbaum (born 1945), American scholar and rabbi who specializes in the study of the memorialization of the Holocaust. He served as Project Director of the United States Holocaust Memorial Museum in 1988–1993.
- Alan L. Berger (born 1939), the Raddock Family Eminent Scholar Chair for Holocaust Studies at Florida Atlantic University, Professor of Jewish Studies at Florida Atlantic University, Director of the Center for the Study of Values and Violence after Auschwitz, Editor and Author of Interdisciplinary Holocaust Scholarship, Co-Editor of Second Generation Voices: Reflections by Children of Holocaust Survivors and Perpetrators, and Member of the Florida Department of Education Holocaust Education Task Force.
- Christopher Browning (born 1944), American historian of the Holocaust who is best known for his work Ordinary Men: Reserve Police Battalion 101 and the Final Solution in Poland, a study of German Reserve Police Battalion 101 that massacred Jews in Poland.
- Lucy Dawidowicz (1915–1990), among the earliest American historians of the Holocaust, whose work, including her book The War Against the Jews: 1933–1945 (1975), investigated the political and social context of the events.
- David Engel (born 1951), American historian and Professor of Holocaust and Judaic Studies at New York University.
- Saul Friedländer (born 1932), Czech-born Jewish historian who researched Modern Europe and Jewish History at the University of California, Los Angeles, publishing multiple books on the history of the Holocaust and its psychological effects.
- Martin Gilbert (1936–2015), British historian who has published many historical volumes about the Holocaust.
- Alena Hájková (1924–2012), Czech Communist resistance fighter who became a chief historian on Jews in the Czechoslovak resistance.
- Raul Hilberg (1926–2007), Austrian-born American political scientist and historian who is widely considered to be the world's preeminent Holocaust scholar.
- Raphael Lemkin (1900–1959), Polish Jewish lawyer who coined the term genocide, which was later adopted by the United Nations in the 1948 Convention on the Prevention and Punishment of the Crime of Genocide.
- Primo Levi (1919–1987), Italian Jewish chemist who survived Auschwitz, and later published over a dozen works. He committed suicide on April 11, 1987.
- Franklin Littell (1917–2009), Protestant scholar who is regarded by some as the founder of the field of Holocaust studies.
- Peter Longerich (born 1955), German professor of history, author and director of the Research Centre for the Holocaust and Twentieth-Century History at Royal Holloway, University of London.
- A. Dirk Moses (born 1967), Australian scholar who researches various aspects of genocide.
- Léon Poliakov (1910–1997), French historian who wrote on the Holocaust and antisemitism.
- Laurence Rees (born 1957), British historian and documentary filmmaker.
- Gerald Reitlinger (1900–1978), British art historian who wrote three works after World War II about Nazi Germany.
- Carol Rittner (born 1943), Distinguished Professor of Holocaust & Genocide Studies at Stockton University, who co-produced the Academy Award nominated documentary The Courage to Care, and has written a number of important works about the Holocaust and various genocides.
- Richard L. Rubenstein (1924–2021), American scholar who is noted for his contributions to Holocaust theology.
- Karl Schleunes (1937-2021), American historian of the Holocaust, best known for The Twisted Road to Auschwitz.
- Art Spiegelman, Polish-American cartoonist best known for his graphic novel Maus, which tells the story of his father's experience as a Polish Jew living in the Holocaust.
- Calel Perechodnik (1916-1944), Jewish policeman in the Otwock ghetto who wrote a memoir, "Am I a Murderer", recounting his experiences and the moral dilemmas he faced during Nazi occupation.

== Education about the Holocaust ==
Education about the Holocaust, or Holocaust education, refers to efforts, in formal and non-formal settings, to teach about the Holocaust. Teaching and Learning about the Holocaust (TLH) addresses didactics and learning, under the larger umbrella of education about the Holocaust, which also comprises curricula and textbooks studies. The expression "Teaching and Learning about the Holocaust" is used by the International Holocaust Remembrance Alliance.

== See also ==
- Aftermath of the Holocaust
- Antisemitism studies
- Antisemitism
- Yehuda Bauer
- Comparisons between Israel and Nazi Germany
- Lucy Dawidowicz
- Double genocide theory
- Genocide education
- Geography of antisemitism
- Martin Gilbert
- Gratz College – a college which is best known for its Holocaust and genocide studies programs which offer both M.A. degrees and PhD's in the subject
- Raul Hilberg
- History of antisemitism
- History of the Jews during World War II
- Holocaust denial
- Holocaust Memorial Center, Farmington Hills, Michigan
- Holocaust Memorial Days
- Holocaust Museum Houston
- Holocaust Studies and Materials
- Holocaust trivialization
- Holocaust victims
- How Holocausts Happen – a book which deals with the genocidal policies of Nicaraguan counterrevolutionary forces and the general public's reaction to the Holocaust in Nazi Germany and German-occupied Europe
- Beate Klarsfeld
- Serge Klarsfeld
- Nora Levin
- Responsibility for the Holocaust
- Rudolph Rummel
- Secondary antisemitism
- Yaron Svoray
- Elie Wiesel
- Simon Wiesenthal
- Timeline of the Holocaust
- United States Holocaust Memorial Museum
- Yad Vashem
- Yom HaShoah
- Efraim Zuroff
- Maus

== Sources ==
- This article incorporates text from a free content work. Licensed under CC-BY-SA IGO 3.0 (license statement/permission). Text taken from Education about the Holocaust and preventing genocide, 18, UNESCO, UNESCO. UNESCO.
