= Abrahamic religions =

Set of monotheistic religions

From left to right: the cross (Christianity), the star and crescent (Islam), and the Star of David (Judaism) are the symbols commonly used to represent the three largest Abrahamic religions.

The Abrahamic religions are a set of monotheistic religions that respect or admire the religious figure Abraham as a patriarch and/or as a prophet, including Judaism, Christianity, Islam, the Baháʼí Faith, the Druze faith, Rastafari, and Samaritanism. The term may also include religions such as Yazidism, Mandaeism, Yarsanism, and Shabakism, although their status as Abrahamic religions is highly controversial and hotly debated because their doctrines set them significantly apart from other Abrahamic religions. The religions of this set share doctrinal, historical, and geographic overlap that contrast them with Indian religions, Iranian religions, and East Asian religions, although some smaller Abrahamic religions, such as the Baha'i Faith, are also Iranian religions. The three largest Abrahamic religions are Christianity, Islam, and Judaism. The term, introduced in the 20th century, replaced "Judeo-Christian" to include Islam as an Abrahamic religion and acknowledge differences between Judaism and Christianity, while the Baháʼí Faith, the Druze faith, Rastafari, and Samaritanism were recognized and classified as Abrahamic religions by a significant minority of scholars in the 20th century. However, the term has been criticized by some scholars for reportedly oversimplifying cultural and doctrinal nuances between the different religions.

== Usage ==
The term Abrahamic religions (and its variations) is a collective religious descriptor for similar and closely related elements shared by Judaism, Christianity, Islam, Baháʼí Faith, the Druze faith, Rastafari, and Samaritanism. It features prominently in interfaith dialogue and civil discourse, as well as academic discourse. The term appears for the first time in the second half of the 20th century.

Although historically the term Abrahamic religions was limited to just Judaism, Christianity, and Islam, restricting the category to these three religions has come under criticism. The late-19th-century Baháʼí Faith has been characterized as Abrahamic, as it is a monotheistic religion that recognizes its own descent from Abraham.

=== Theological discourse ===
The figure of Abraham is suggested as a common ground for Judaism, Christianity, Islam, Samaritanism, the Druze Faith, the Baha'i Faith, and Rastafari, and a hypothesized eschatological reconciliation of the seven religions. Commonalities may include creation, revelation, and redemption, but such shared concepts vary significantly between and within the Abrahamic religions themselves. Proponents of the term argue that all seven religions are united through the deity worshipped by Abraham.

The Catholic scholar of Islam Louis Massignon argued that the phrase "Abrahamic religion" means that the religions come from one spiritual source. The modern term comes from the plural form of a Quranic reference to dīn Ibrāhīm ("religion of Abraham").

In Christianity, Paul the Apostle, in Romans 4:11–12, refers to Abraham as "father of all", including those "who have faith, circumcised or uncircumcised." From its founding, Islam likewise conceived of itself as the "religion of Abraham". The Bahá’í scriptures state that the religion's founder, Baháʼu'lláh, descended from Abraham through his wife Keturah's sons.

=== Criticism ===
The appropriateness of grouping Judaism, Christianity, and Islam as "Abrahamic religions" and related terms has been challenged. Adam Dodds argues that the term "Abrahamic faiths", while helpful, can be misleading, as it conveys an unspecified historical and theological commonality that is problematic on closer examination. While there is commonality among the religions, their shared ancestry is mainly peripheral to their respective foundational theological claims, practices, and cultures, concealing irreconcilable differences. Alan L. Berger, professor of Judaic studies at Florida Atlantic University, wrote in 2012 that "while Judaism birthed both Christianity and Islam, the three monotheistic faiths went their separate ways", and "each tradition views the figure [of Abraham] differently as seen in the theological claims they make about him." Aaron W. Hughes, meanwhile, describes the term as "imprecise" and "largely a theological neologism." Hughes observes that before the 20th century, the adjective "Abrahamic" appeared exclusively in the context of Christian supersessionism, and that the equivalent Muslim term millat Ibrahim was used as part of an Islamic historiography rather than to join different religions together. Furthermore, Massignon's early use of "Abrahamic religions" had similarly theological overtones, offering a path for converting both Jews and Muslims.

The common Christian doctrines of Jesus's Incarnation, the Trinity, and the resurrection of Jesus, for example, are accepted in neither Judaism nor Islam. There are fundamental beliefs in both Islam and Judaism that are likewise denied by most of Christianity (e.g., the religious restrictions on the consumption of pork found in Jewish and Islamic dietary laws), and key beliefs of Islam, Christianity, and the Baháʼí Faith not shared by Judaism (e.g., the prophetic and messianic status of Jesus).

== Religions ==
=== Judaism ===
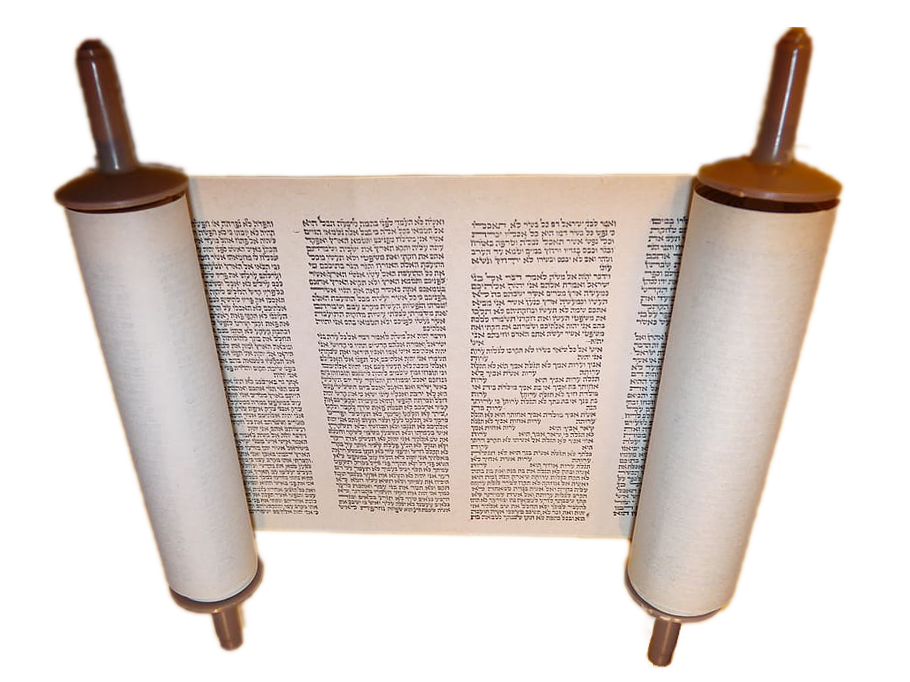
The Torah forms the basis and foundation of Judaism and corresponds to the first five books of the Bible.

Jewish tradition claims that the Twelve Tribes of Israel are descended from Abraham through his son Isaac and grandson Jacob, whose sons formed the nation of the Israelites in Canaan.

In its early stages, the Israelite religion (Yahwism) shares traits with the Canaanite religions of the Bronze Age; by the Iron Age, it had become distinct from other Canaanite religions as it shed polytheism for monolatry. They understood their relationship with their god, Yahweh, as a covenant and that the deity promised Abraham a permanent homeland.

While the Book of Genesis speaks of ʾĔlōhīm, comparable to the Enūma Eliš speaking of various gods of the Canaanite pantheon to create the earth, at the time of the Babylonian captivity, Jewish theologians attributed the six-day narrative all to Yahweh, reflecting an early conception of Yahweh as a universal deity. The monolatrist nature of Yahwism was further developed in the period following the Babylonian captivity, eventually emerging as a firm religious movement of monotheism. With the Fall of Babylon, Judaism incorporated concepts such as messianism, belief in free will and judgement after death, conception of heaven and hell, angels and demons, among others, into their belief-system.

=== Christianity ===
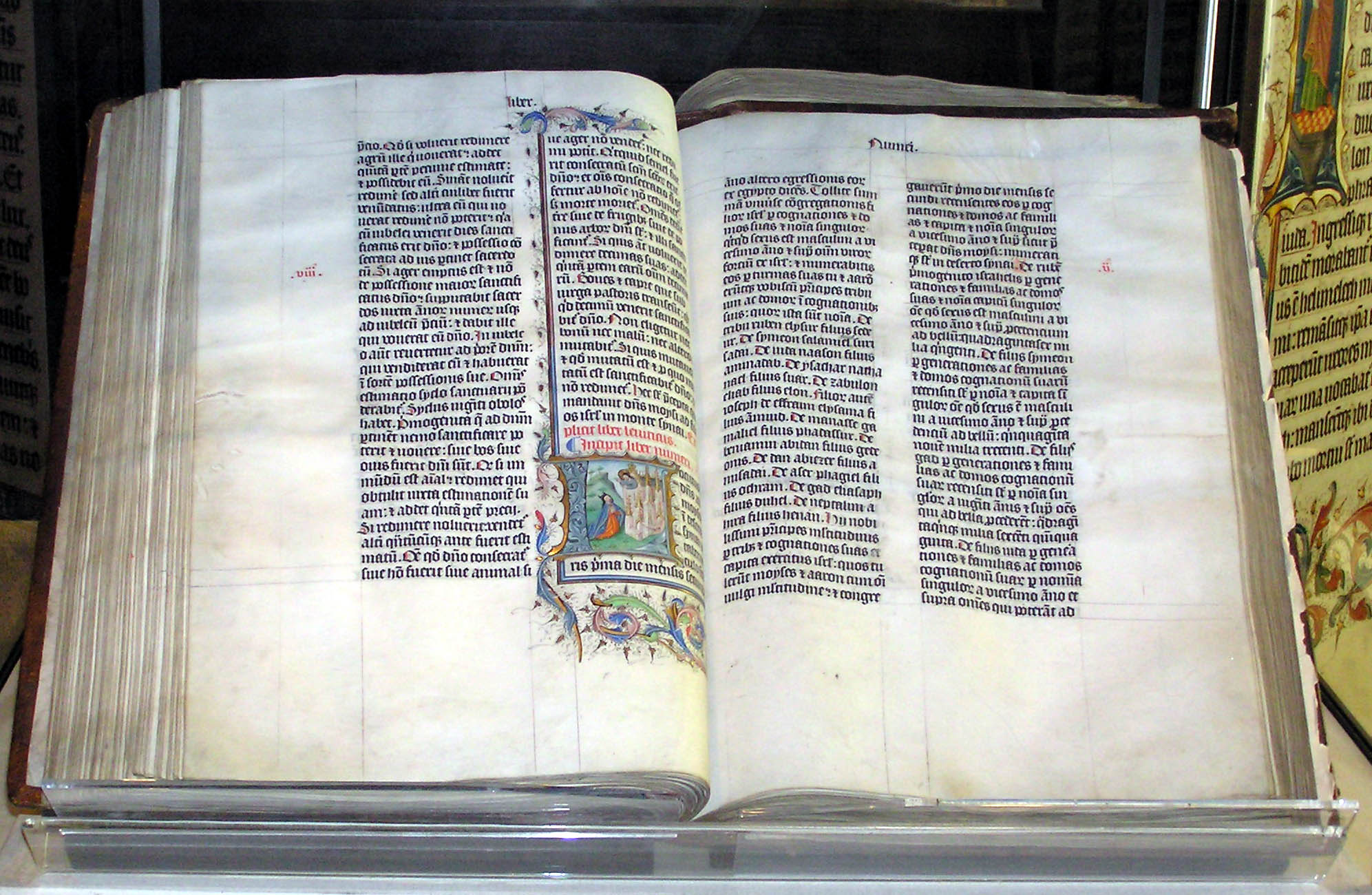
A Bible handwritten in Latin, on display in Malmesbury Abbey, Wiltshire, England. This Bible was transcribed in Belgium in 1407 for reading aloud in a monastery.

Christianity traces back their origin to the 1st century and refers to themselves as a continuation of Judaism (commonly referred to as the old covenant) initially led by Jesus. His followers viewed him as the Messiah, as in the Confession of Peter; after his crucifixion and death they came to view him as God incarnate, who was resurrected and will return at the end of time to judge the living and the dead and create an eternal Kingdom of God.

In the 1st century AD, under the Apostles of Jesus of Nazareth; Christianity spread widely. Paul the Apostle interpreted the role of Abraham differently from the Jews of his time. While for the Jews, Abraham was considered a loyal monotheist in a polytheistic environment, Paul celebrates Abraham as a man who found faith in God before adhering to religious law. In contrast to Judaism, adherence to religious law becomes associated with idolatry.

While Christians fashioned their religion around Jesus of Nazareth, the siege of Jerusalem (70 CE), forced Jews to reconcile their belief-system with the destruction of the Second Temple and associated rituals. At this time, both Judaism and Christianity had to systematize their scriptures and beliefs, resulting in competing theologies both claiming Abrahamic heritage. Christians could hardly dismiss the Hebrew scriptures as Jesus himself refers to them according to Christian reports, and parallels between Jesus and the Biblical stories of creation and redemption starting with Abraham in the Book of Genesis. The distant God asserted by Jesus according to the Christians, created a form of dualism between Creator and creation and the doctrine of Creatio ex nihilo, which later heavily influenced Jewish and Islamic theology. By that, Christians established their own identity, distinct from both Greeks and Jews, as those who venerate and worship the deity of Jesus.

After several periods of alternating persecution and relative peace vis-à-vis the Roman authorities under different administrations, Christianity became the state church of the Roman Empire in 380, but has been split into various churches from its beginning. An attempt was made by the Byzantine Empire to unify Christendom, but this formally failed with the East–West Schism of 1054. In the 16th century, the birth and growth of Protestantism during the Reformation further split Christianity into many denominations. Christianity remains culturally diverse in its Western and Eastern branches, Christianity played a prominent role in the development of Western civilization.

=== Islam ===
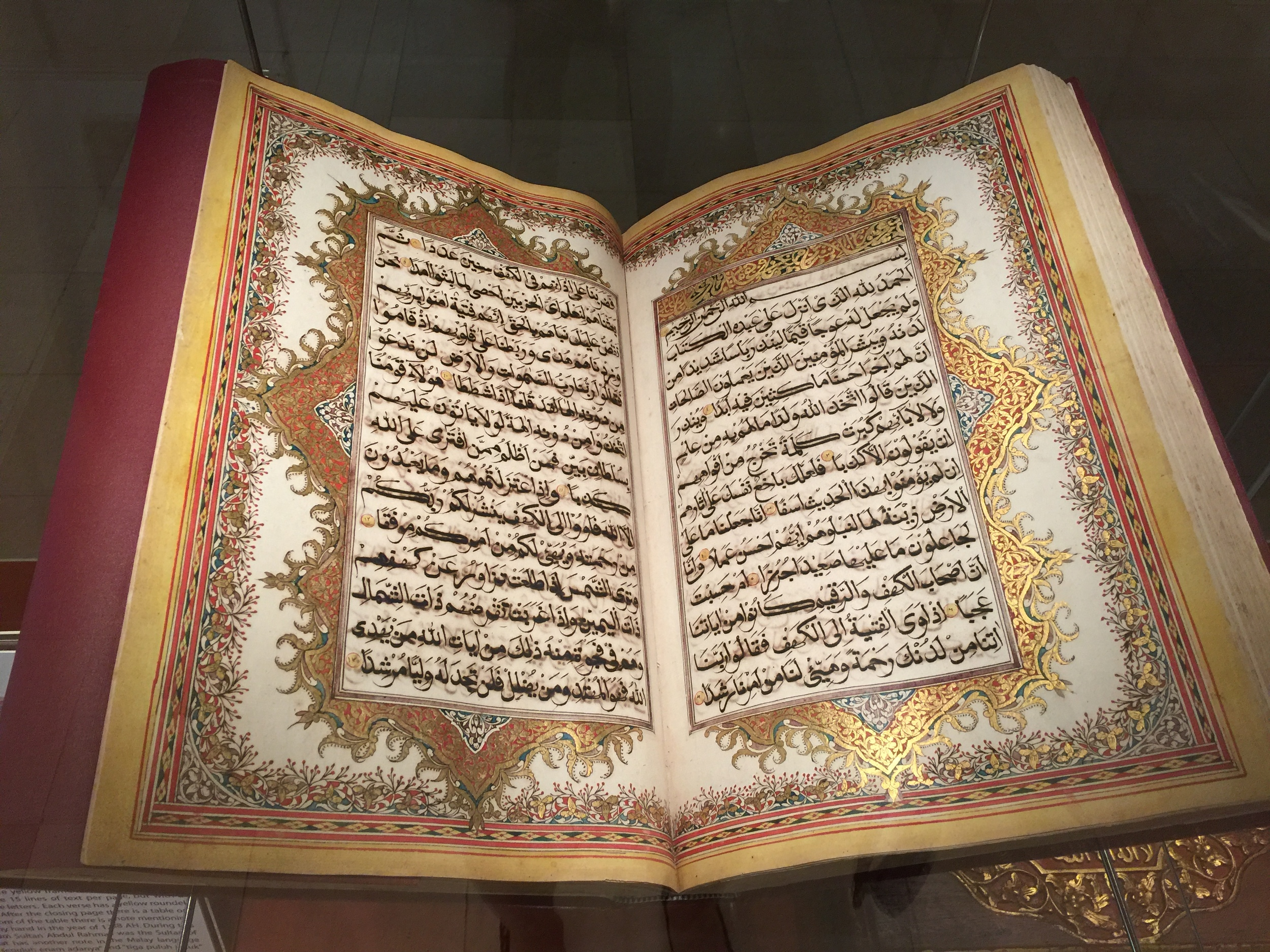
The Quran is the holy book of Islam forming the basis for the religion

Islam is based on the teachings of the Quran. Although it considers Muhammad to be the Seal of the prophets, Islam teaches that every prophet preached Islam, as the word Islam means submission to God, the main concept preached by all prophets. Although the Quran is the central religious text of Islam, which Muslims believe to be a revelation from God, other Islamic books considered to be revealed by God before the Quran, mentioned by name in the Quran are the Tawrat (Torah) revealed to the prophets and messengers amongst the Children of Israel (Bani Israil), the Zabur (Psalms) revealed to Dawud (David) and the Injil (the Gospel) revealed to Isa (Jesus). The Quran also mentions God having revealed the Scrolls of Abraham and the Scrolls of Moses. Islamic tradition claims that twelve Arab tribes known as the Ishmaelites are descended from Abraham through his son Ishmael in the Arabian Peninsula.

The relationship between Islamic and Hebrew scriptures and New Testament differs significantly from the relationship between the New Testament and the Hebrew Bible. Whereas the New Testament draws heavily on the Hebrew Bible and interprets its text in light of the foundations of the new religion, the Quran only alludes to various stories of Biblical writings, but remains independent of both, focusing on establishing a monotheistic message by utilizing the stories of the prophets in a religious decentralized environment.

In the 7th century AD, Islam was founded by Muhammad in the Arabian Peninsula; it spread widely through the early Muslim conquests, shortly after his death. Islam understands its form of "Abrahamic monotheism" as preceding both Judaism and Christianity, and in contrast with Arabian Henotheism.

The teachings of the Quran are believed by Muslims to be the direct and final revelation and words of God. Islam, like Christianity, is a universal religion (i.e. membership is open to anyone). Like Judaism, it has a strictly unitary conception of God, called tawhid or "strict monotheism". The story of the creation of the world in the Quran is elaborated less extensively than in the Hebrew scripture, emphasizing the transcendence and universality of God, instead. According to the Quran, God says kun fa-yakūnu. The Quran describes God as the creator of "heavens and earth", to emphasize that it is a universal God and not a local Arabian deity.

=== Others ===
Samaritanism is considered by some Jewish and Christian apologetics to be a sect which diverged from Judaism in the 6th to 3rd centuries BCE. There is growing archaeological, genealogical, and textual evidence in modern times which has supported the status of the Israelite Samaritans as an independent Abrahamic ethnoreligion and indigenous people of the Levant in their own right. The evidence has bolstered their claim to a distinct legal religious status.

Some sources consider Mandaeism to be an Abrahamic religion – however, that classification is controversial, given that Mandaeism does not accept Abraham as a prophet, despite revering as prophets several other figures from the Jewish scriptures. On the contrary, the Mandaeans believe that Abraham was originally a priest of their religion, but became an apostate from it.

Druze is another religion which emerged from Islam in the 11th century, and hence is sometimes also considered an Abrahamic religion.

Yarsanism is a Kurdish religion which combines elements of Shi'a Islam with pre-Islamic Kurdish beliefs; it has been classified as Abrahamic by some due to its monotheism, incorporation of Islamic doctrines, and reverence for Islamic figures, especially Ali ibn Abi Talib, the fourth caliph and first imam of Shia Islam. Yazidism, another Kurdish religion, is considered a syncretic religion and shares elements with Shia Islam, Mandaeism, Christianity, and Judaism, including a belief in Adam and Abraham. It has also been influenced by Islamic mysticism and Gnostic Christianity. In Yazidism, the prophet Abraham is invoked during prayers before a meal, especially ritual meals.

==== Modern era ====
A number of sources include the Baháʼí Faith, established in the 19th century, since it historically emerged in an Islamic milieu, and shares several beliefs with the Abrahamic faiths, including monotheism and recognising Jewish, Christian and Islamic figures as prophets. Some scholars include Bábism, a 19th-century movement and precursor to the Baháʼí Faith.

A few academic scholars of religion also argue that the Latter Day Saint movement, also known as Mormonism, represents a distinct Abrahamic religion that emerged from Christianity in the 19th century. In contrast, the majority of reglious studies scholarship classifies Mormonism as a distinct tradition within Christianity.

Rastafari, an Afrocentric religion which emerged from Christianity in 1930s Jamaica, is also sometimes classified as Abrahamic, in particular due to its monotheism and use of the Bible as scripture.

== Common aspects ==
Abrahamic religions agree upon the createdness of the universe by God, who is conceived of as eternal, omnipotent, and omniscient. All three identify the creator of the universe with the God revealed to Abraham. However, they differ on how to conceptualize God. Christianity proposes God's utter transcendence and that an intermediary — such as an incarnation of God — is required to bridge the gap between God and humans. According to Islam, God is knowable through his creation, metaphorical stories of the prophets stored in the Quran, and signs in nature. Christianity proposes God's personhood in the form of a Son of God as an aspect of the Divinity as formulated in the doctrine of the Trinity. In contrast, God in Islam is less personal than described in the Judeo-Christian tradition, and more of a mysterious power behind all aspects of the universe.

Their religious texts feature many of the same figures, histories, and places, although they often present them with different roles, perspectives, and meanings. Believers who agree on these similarities and the common Abrahamic origin tend to also be more positive towards other Abrahamic groups.

== Differences ==
=== Circumcision ===
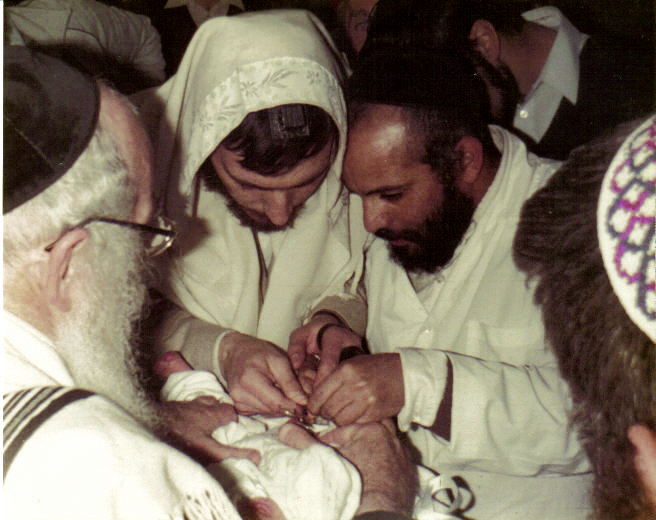
Preparing for a Jewish ritual circumcision.

Religious law in Judaism and Samaritanism commands that males be circumcised when they are eight days old, as does the sunnah ('tradition') in Islam. Despite its common practice in Muslim-majority nations, circumcision is considered to be sunnah and not required for a life directed by Allah. Although there is some debate within Islam over whether it is a religious requirement or mere recommendation, circumcision (called khitan) is practiced nearly universally by Muslim males.

Today, many Christian denominations are neutral about ritual male circumcision, neither requiring it for religious observance nor forbidding it for cultural or other reasons. Western Christianity replaced the custom of male circumcision with the ritual of baptism, a ceremony which varies according to the doctrine of the denomination, but it generally includes immersion, aspersion, or anointment with water. The Early Church, as recorded in Acts 15 at the Council of Jerusalem, decided that Gentile Christians are not required to undergo circumcision. The Council of Florence in the 15th century prohibited it. Paragraph #2297 of the Catechism of the Catholic Church calls non-medical amputation or mutilation immoral. By the 21st century, the Catholic Church had adopted a neutral position on the practice, as long as it was not practised as an initiation ritual. Catholic scholars make various arguments in support of the idea that this policy is not in contradiction with the previous edicts. The New Testament, in Acts 15, records that Christianity did not require circumcision. Coptic Christians practice circumcision as a rite of passage. The Eritrean Orthodox Church and the Ethiopian Orthodox Tewahedo Church calls for circumcision, with near-universal prevalence among Orthodox men in Ethiopia.

Many countries with majorities of Christian adherents in Europe and Latin America have low circumcision rates. In contrast, both religious and non-religious circumcision is widely practiced in many predominantly Christian countries and among Christian communities in the Anglosphere countries, Oceania, South Korea, the Philippines, the Middle East and Africa. Countries such as the United States, the Philippines, Australia (albeit primarily in the older generations), Canada, Cameroon, Democratic Republic of the Congo, Ethiopia, Equatorial Guinea, Ghana, Nigeria, Kenya, and many other African Christian countries have high circumcision rates. Circumcision is near universal in the Christian countries of Oceania. In some African and Eastern Christian denominations male circumcision is an integral or established practice, and require that their male members undergo circumcision. Coptic Christianity and Ethiopian Orthodoxy and Eritrean Orthodoxy still observe male circumcision and practice circumcision as a rite of passage. Male circumcision is also widely practiced among Christians from Egypt, Syria, Lebanon, Jordan, Palestine, Israel, and North Africa. (See also aposthia.)

Male circumcision is among the rites of Islam and is part of the fitrah, or the innate disposition and natural character and instinct of the human creation.

Although circumcision is widely practiced among the Druze, it is performed as a cultural tradition and has no religious significance in the Druze faith. Some Druze do not circumcise their male children, and refuse to observe this "common Muslim practice".

Circumcision is not a religious practice of the Bahá'í Faith, and the decision is left to the parents.

=== Proselytism ===
Judaism accepts converts, but has had no explicit missionaries since the end of the Second Temple period. Judaism states that non-Jews can achieve righteousness by following Noahide Laws, a set of moral imperatives that, according to the Talmud, were given by God (Note: According to Encyclopedia Talmudit (Hebrew edition, Israel, 5741/1981, Entry Ben Noah, page 349), most medieval authorities consider that all seven commandments were given to Adam, although Maimonides (Mishneh Torah, Hilkhot M'lakhim 9:1) considers the dietary law to have been given to Noah.) as a binding set of laws for the "children of Noah"—that is, all of humanity. (Note: Compare Genesis 9:4–6.) It is believed that as much as 10% of the Roman Empire followed Judaism either as fully ritually obligated Jews or the simpler rituals required of non-Jewish members of that faith.

Moses Maimonides, one of the major Jewish teachers, commented: "Quoting from our sages, the righteous people from other nations have a place in the world to come if they have acquired what they should learn about the Creator." Because the commandments applicable to the Jews are much more detailed and onerous than Noahide laws, Jewish scholars have traditionally maintained that it is better to be a good non-Jew than a bad Jew, thus discouraging conversion. In the U.S., as of 2003, 28% of married Jews were married to non-Jews. See also Conversion to Judaism.

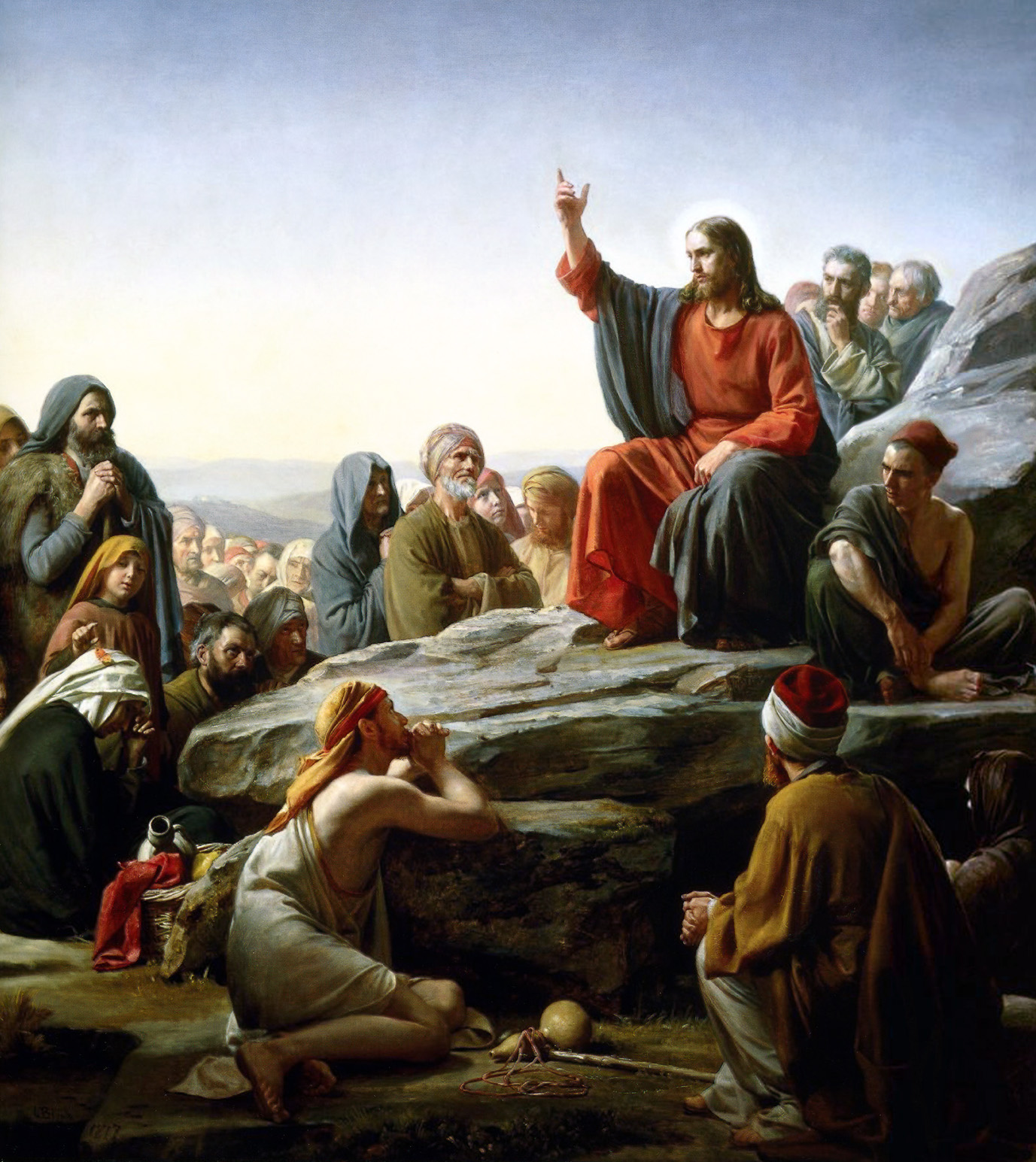
The Sermon on the Mount by Carl Heinrich Bloch (1877)

Christianity encourages evangelism. Many Christian organizations, especially Protestant churches, send missionaries to non-Christian communities throughout the world. See also Great Commission. Forced conversions to Catholicism have happened at various points throughout history. The most prominently cited instances are the conversions of the pagans after Constantine; of Muslims, Jews and Eastern Orthodox during the Crusades; of Jews and Muslims during the time of the Spanish Inquisition, where they were offered the choice of exile, conversion or death; and of the Aztecs by Hernán Cortés. Forced conversions to Protestantism has occurred as well, notably during the Reformation, especially in England and Ireland (see recusancy and Popish plot).

Forced conversions are now condemned as sinful by major denominations such as the Roman Catholic Church, which officially states that forced conversions pollute the Christian religion and offend human dignity, so that past or present offences are regarded as a scandal (a cause of unbelief). According to Pope Paul VI, "It is one of the major tenets of Catholic doctrine that man's response to God in faith must be free: no one, therefore, is to be forced to embrace the Christian faith against his own will." The Roman Catholic Church has declared that Catholics should fight anti-Semitism.

Islam encourages proselytism in various forms. Dawah is an important Islamic concept that denotes the preaching of Islam. Da‘wah literally means "issuing a summons" or "making an invitation". A Muslim who practices da‘wah, either as a religious worker or in a volunteer community effort, is called a dā‘ī, plural du‘āt. A dā‘ī is thus a person who invites people to understand Islam through a dialogical process and may be categorized in some cases as the Islamic equivalent of a missionary, as one who invites people to the faith, to the prayer, or to Islamic life.

Da'wah activities can take many forms. Some pursue Islamic studies specifically to perform Da'wah. Mosques and other Islamic centers sometimes actively spread Da'wah, similar to evangelical churches. Others consider being open to the public and answering questions to be Da'wah. Recalling Muslims to the faith and expanding their knowledge can also be considered Da'wah.

In Islamic theology, the purpose of Da'wah is to invite people, both Muslims and non-Muslims, to understand the commandments of God as expressed in the Quran and the Sunnah of the Prophet, as well as to inform them about Muhammad. Da'wah produces converts to Islam, which in turn grows the size of the Muslim Ummah, or community of Muslims.

While there were instances of forced conversions to Islam, these were neither the norm nor part of a systematic strategy of expansion. Many Muslim rulers practiced religious pluralism, and the Quran explicitly prohibits compulsion in matters of faith. Most conversions to Islam occurred gradually, driven by social, cultural, and economic influences rather than coercion. However, forcible conversion continues to be practiced in parts of the Islamic world.

== Demographics ==
Abrahamic Religions in comparison to other religious groups
1. Abrahamic Religions (53.5%)
2. Indian Religions (18.0%)
3. Irreligion (15.4%)
4. Iranian religions (0.03%)
5. East Asian religions (2.41%)
6. Other Religions (10.7%)
Worldwide percentage of adherents by Abrahamic religion, as of 2020
1. Christianity (28.2%)
2. Islam (25.0%)
3. Other Abrahamic faiths (2.35%)
4. Non-Abrahamic religions and religiously unaffiliated people (44.4%)

Christianity is the largest Abrahamic religion with about 2.3 billion adherents, called Christians, constituting about 31.1% of the world's population. Islam is the second largest Abrahamic religion, as well as the fastest-growing Abrahamic religion in recent decades. It has about 2.0 billion adherents, called Muslims, constituting about 24.1% of the world's population. The third largest Abrahamic religion is Judaism with about 14.1 million adherents, called Jews. The Baháʼí Faith has over 8 million adherents, making it the fourth largest Abrahamic religion, and the fastest growing religion across the 20th century, usually at least twice the rate of population growth. The Druze faith has between one million and nearly two million adherents.

Adherents of Abrahamic faiths
Religion	Adherents
Christianity	2.3 billion
Islam	2.0 billion
Judaism	14.1 million
Baháʼí	7–8 million
Druze	1–2 million
Rastafari	700,000–1 million
Yarsanism	500,000–1 million
Mandaeism	60,000–100,000
Samaritanism	~900

== See also ==
- Abraham's family tree
- Abrahamic Family House, a complex in Abu Dhabi built in the spirit of Abrahamic unity
- Abrahamites
- Ancient Semitic religion
- Din-i Ilahi
- Center for Muslim-Jewish Engagement
- Chrislam
- Christianity and Islam
- Christianity and Judaism
- Christianity and other religions
- Gnosticism
- Interfaith dialogue
- Islamic–Jewish relations
- Islam and other religions
- Jesus in Christianity
- Jesus in Islam
- Jewish views on religious pluralism
- Judaism's view of Jesus
- Judeo-Christian
- Judeo-Christian ethics
- List of burial places of Abrahamic figures
- List of people in both the Bible and the Quran
- Religious perspectives on Jesus
- Yazidism
- Milah Abraham
- People of the Book
- Sabians
- Table of prophets of Abrahamic religions
- Yarsanism
- Manichaeism
- Mormonism
- Unification Church
