= Lynn Rapaport =

American sociologist

Lynn Rapaport is an American sociologist and Holocaust scholar. She is the Henry Snyder Professor of Sociology at Pomona College in Claremont, California.

She received her undergraduate degree from the University of Southern California and her doctorate from Columbia University.
