= Pamela Kyle Crossley =

American historian (born 1955)

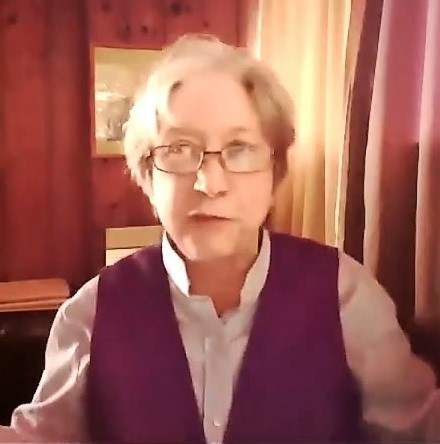
Crossley in 2021

Pamela Kyle Crossley (born 18 November 1955) is an American historian of modern China, northern Asia, and global history and is the Charles and Elfriede Collis Professor of History, Dartmouth College. She is a founding appointment of the Dartmouth Society of Fellows.

Crossley is known for an interpretation of the source of twentieth-century identities. In her view overland conquest by the great empires of early modern Eurasia produced a special form of rulership which gave high priority to the institutionalization of cultural identity. Crossley suggests that these concepts were encoded in political practice and academic discourse on "nationalism," and prevailed till the end of the twentieth century.

== Life ==
Crossley was born in Lima, Ohio, and attended high school in Emmaus, Pennsylvania. After leaving high school she worked as an editorial assistant and writer on environmental subjects for Rodale Press. In 1977 she graduated from Swarthmore College, where she was editor-in-chief of The Phoenix; her fellow students included David C. Page, Robert Zoellick, Ben Brantley, Wing Thye Woo, Robert P. George, Jacqueline Carey and David G. Bradley. At Swarthmore she was a student of Lillian M. Li and Bruce Cumings, and as an undergraduate began graduate study at the University of Pennsylvania with Hilary Conroy. She later entered Yale University, where she was a student of Yu Ying-shih and Parker Po-fei Huang, and wrote a dissertation under the direction of Jonathan D. Spence.

== Career ==
Crossley joined the history faculty at Dartmouth College in 1985. Over the course of her career she held several prestigious appointments, including the Pat and John Rosenwald Research Professorship (1997–2002), the Robert 1932 and Barbara Black Professorship of Asian History (2002–2011), and ultimately the Charles and Elfriede Collis Professorship of History. She was also among the original appointees to the Dartmouth Society of Fellows, reflecting her importance to the university's intellectual community. Following her retirement in 2023, she was named Professor Emerita of History.

== Research and scholarly works ==
Crossley examines how large political systems and empires shaped the development of ethnic, cultural, and national identities across Eurasia. Her research explores the ways in which governments create and manage categories of belonging, and how those categories influence the formation of modern nations and political communities.

One of Crossley's most significant areas of research is the study of nationalism and identity formation. She argues that concepts such as nation, ethnicity, race, and citizenship are not ancient or natural categories but are historically constructed through political and administrative processes. In works such as A Translucent Mirror: History and Identity in Qing Imperial Ideology (1999), she examines how imperial governments developed narratives of identity and legitimacy that later influenced modern nationalist movements. Her scholarship challenges essentialist views of ethnicity and demonstrates how political institutions actively shape collective identities over time.

Crossley has also made important contributions to the field of global history. In her book What Is Global History? (2008), she advocates for a historical approach that emphasizes connections, exchanges, and interactions across regions rather than focusing exclusively on individual nations or civilizations. She explores how migration, trade, technological diffusion, environmental change, and imperial expansion created interconnected historical systems that influenced societies around the world. Her work helped popularize global history as a field that seeks to understand broad patterns of human interaction on a worldwide scale.

In her later career, Crossley increasingly turned her attention to the history of nomadic and Inner Asian peoples. Her book Hammer and Anvil: Nomad Rulers at the Forge of the Modern World (2019) argues that nomadic societies played a central role in world history and were crucial contributors to political innovation. Rejecting older interpretations that portrayed steppe peoples primarily as destructive invaders, Crossley demonstrates how nomadic rulers influenced state formation, military organization, and imperial governance across Eurasia. She places Inner Asian societies at the center of historical development and emphasizes their lasting impact on the modern world.

Beyond her specialized research, Crossley has made substantial contributions to history education through widely used world-history textbooks, including The Earth and Its Peoples: A Global History and Global Society: The World Since 1900. These works introduced generations of students to comparative and global approaches to historical study. Across her diverse body of scholarship, a common theme emerges: the investigation of how empires, states, and political institutions create identities, organize societies, and influence historical change on both regional and global scales.

Her work has appeared in two separate series of the Cambridge histories. She is widely published both in academic journals and in periodicals such as London Review of Books, Wall Street Journal, The New York Times Literary Supplement, The New Republic, Royal Academy Magazine, Far Eastern Economic Review, Calliope, and in the online editorial spaces of the BBC. She has participated in A&E's "In Search of..." series ("The Forbidden City"). In January 2012 the new educational platform The Faculty Project announced that Crossley would produce a video course on Modern China for their site. Unusually, Crossley maintains an errata page for her publications, including exchanges with translators.

== Selected bibliography ==
- Crossley, Pamela Kyle (1999). A Translucent Mirror: History and Identity in Qing Imperial Ideology. University of California Press. ISBN 978-0-520-23424-6.
- Crossley, Pamela Kyle (2010). The wobbling pivot: China since 1800 ; an interpretive history (1. publ ed.). Malden, Mass. [Weinheim]: Wiley-Blackwell. ISBN 978-1-4051-6080-3.
- Crossley, Pamela Kyle (2008-03-03). What is Global History?. Polity. ISBN 978-0-7456-3300-8.
- Crossley, Pamela Kyle (1991). Orphan warriors: three Manchu generations and the end of the Qing world. Princeton paperbacks Asian studies (1. Princeton paperback print ed.). Princeton, NJ: Princeton Univ. Press. ISBN 978-0-691-00877-6.
- Crossley, Pamela Kyle (2019). Hammer and anvil: nomad rulers at the forge of the modern world. Lanham, Maryland: Rowman & Littlefield. ISBN 978-1-4422-1443-9.
- Crossley, Pamela Kyle, ed. (2007). Empire at the margins: culture, ethnicity, and frontier in early modern China. Studies on China (Nachdr. ed.). Berkeley: Univ. of California Pr. ISBN 978-0-520-23015-6.

== Awards and Honors ==
- Guggenheim Fellowship
- National Endowment for the Humanities Fellowship
- Joseph Levenson Book Prize from the Association for Asian Studies for A Translucent Mirror
- Jerome Goldstein Award for Distinguished Teaching at Dartmouth College
- Karen E. Wetterhahn Memorial Award for Distinguished Creative or Scholarly Achievement
- Dartmouth’s Society of Fellows
