= Alan L. Berger =

American scholar and professor of Judaic studies

Alan Berger
- Born: November 16, 1939 (age 86)
- Other names: A.L Berger, A.L.B
- Occupations: Religion scholar, writer, literary scholar, lecturer, academician
- Years active: 1978 to present
- Known for: Judaic education and Holocaust studies program at the Florida Atlantic University
- Title: Raddock Eminent Scholar Chair in Holocaust Studies at Florida Atlantic University
- Spouse: Naomi Berger (m. 1980)
- Awards: The 2002 B’nai Zion National Media Award, for edition of The second generation voices.

Academic background
- Education: Syracuse University; Upsala College; University of Chicago Divinity School; Hebrew University
- Alma mater: Upsala College; University of Chicago Divinity School; Syracuse University

Academic work
- Discipline: Religious studies
- Institutions: Florida Atlantic University, Syracuse University
- Main interests: Religious studies
- Notable works: Edited: The second generation voices: Reflections by Children of Holocaust Survivors and Perpetrators.; Emerging Trends in Third-Generation Holocaust Literature. 2023; Encyclopedia of Holocaust Literature. (Spring), 2020.

Alan L. Berger (born November 16, 1939) is an American scholar, writer and professor of Judaic Studies and Holocaust studies at the Florida Atlantic University. He occupies the Raddock Eminent Scholar Chair in Holocaust Studies at Florida Atlantic University and is director of the Center for the Study of Values and Violence After Auschwitz. He is best known for Judaism education, debates about grouping Judaism, Christianity and Islam together under the term Abrahamic religions, and as a scholar of Holocaust studies.

He graduated from the Hebrew University in 1972. He holds a B.A. from Upsala College in New Jersey, an M.A. from University of Chicago Divinity School and obtained his Ph.D. from the Syracuse University in humanities studies in 1978.

== Career ==
Berger was Judaic Studies lecturer at Florida Atlantic University since 1995, and was lecturer at Syracuse University in the department of Religious studies from 1973 to 1995. In 1980, he established the Jewish Studies program at the University of New York, Syracuse and from 1988 to 1989, he was a visiting associate professor of Judaic Studies in the Williamsburg, College of William and Mary, he lectures short courses at some institutions and mostly lectures on the Holocaust studies abroad for many years.

== Holocaust and Jewish Studies establishment ==
Berger was the founder of Holocaust and Judaic Studies, a B.A programs in 1980 at Florida Atlantic University and also chaired the directory head from 1998 to 2005. It was when he was lecturer in the department of Religious studies at Syracuse University that he established the Jewish Studies Program and was acting interim head of Fine Arts department and Religion studies Department, he also became a visiting Gumenick professor of Judaica at the College of William and Mary having chairs conference of Annual scholars in the Holocaust and churches in 1989 to 1990 and had also being a guest head of Lessons and Legacies of the Holocaust Conference programs that of 1989, 1998 and the one of 2010 and 2014, Berger served as a series editor in the Syracuse University Press of Theology, Holocaust and other Religion from 1998 to 2004.

== Other contributions and essays ==
Berger had contributed to as many article, books and essays. He did more than 50 encyclopedia works. His article appeared in place and varieties, such are the likes of Religion and American Culture Journal of Ecumenical Studies, Encyclopedia of Genocide, Modern Judaism, Encyclopedia of Jewish American History and Culture, Jewish Book Annual, Studies in American Jewish Literature, Modern Language Studies, Saul Bellow Journal, Australian Journal of Jewish Studies, Judaism, Jewish Book Annual, Sociological Analysis and Literature and Belief.

List of books edited and awards

- The second generation voices: Reflections by Children of Holocaust Survivors and Perpetrators. Author and Editors; A L. Berger and Naomi Berger. 2001. ISBN 0815628846. (Edition won the 2002 B’nai Zion National Media Award)
- Encyclopedia of Holocaust Literature. (Spring), 2002. Co-editors; A L. Berger. (won the Booklist Best Reference Book of 2002 award and the Outstanding Reference Source 2003 – Reference and User Services Association of the ALA)
- The Continuing Agony: From the Carmelite Convent to the Crosses at Auschwitz (Spring), 2004, (nominated for the American Catholic Historical Association's John Gilmary Shea Prizes)
- Jewish American and Holocaust Literature: Representation in the Postmodern World, 2004
- Jewish-Christian Dialogue: Drawing Honey from the Rock, Paragon House, Co-authors; A L. Berger, 2008
- Encyclopedia of Jewish American Literature, co-editors; A L. Berger, 2009
- Trialogue and Terror: Judaism, Christianity and Islam Respond to 9/11, Cascade Press, 2011
- Post-Holocaust Jewish-Christian Dialogue: After the Flood, Before the Rainbow. contributor and Editors; A L. Berger, 2015
- Third Generation Holocaust Representation: Trauma, History, and Memory. Northwestern University Press, co-authors; A L. Berger, 2017.
- Religious Fundamentalism and Political Extremism. Author and Editor; A L. Berger. Published by University of Pennsylvania Press,2018.
