= Richard L. Rubenstein =

American rabbi and theologian (1924–2021)

- Born: Richard Lowell Rubenstein; January 8, 1924; New York City, U.S.
- Died: May 16, 2021 (aged 97); Bridgeport, Connecticut, U.S.
- Occupations: Rabbi, Professor
- Title: Rabbi

Richard Lowell Rubenstein (January 8, 1924 – May 16, 2021) was a rabbi, theologian, educator, and writer, noted particularly for his path-breaking contributions to post-Holocaust theology and his sociopolitical analyses of surplus populations and bureaucracy. A Connecticut resident, he was married to art historian Betty Rogers Rubenstein (d. 2013).

== Education ==
Rubenstein was born in New York City on January 8, 1924. He began his undergraduate studies at the City University of New York and completed them at the University of Cincinnati. While in Cincinnati, Rubenstein also studied for the rabbinate through the Reform-affiliated Hebrew Union College, where Abraham Joshua Heschel was a faculty member at the time. After completing his B.A. at the University of Cincinnati, Rubenstein discontinued his studies at Hebrew Union College. Instead of continuing training in the Reform movement, he followed Heschel to the Jewish Theological Seminary of America (JTSA), where he received rabbinical ordination into the Conservative movement and a master's degree in 1952. Subsequently, he studied under the Christian theologian Paul Tillich at Harvard Divinity School, where he earned a master's degree in sacred theology and a doctoral degree in the history of religion in 1960. He was later awarded two honorary degrees: The first, a Doctorate of Hebrew Letters from JTSA, and the second, a Doctorate of Humane Letters, from Grand Valley State University.

== Career ==
Following his ordination in 1952, Rubenstein was the rabbi of two Massachusetts congregations in succession, and then in 1956 became assistant director of the B'nai B'rith Hillel Foundation and chaplain to the Jewish students at Harvard University, Radcliffe, and Wellesley, where he served until 1958. From 1958 to 1970, he was the director of the B'nai B'rith Hillel Foundation and chaplain to the Jewish students at the University of Pittsburgh, Carnegie-Mellon University, and Duquesne University. At the University of Pittsburgh, he also taught an upper division course on French Existentialism.

From 1970 to 1995, Rubenstein taught in religious studies at Florida State University, where he held a professorial chair. He then became president and professor of religion at the University of Bridgeport, where he served from 1995 to 1999.

Rubenstein was also a newspaper columnist for a Japanese newspaper and authored several books on the Holocaust, theology, Jewish-Christian relations, ethics, and politics.

=== The Holocaust and death of God ===
Rubenstein emerged in the 1960s as a significant writer on the meaning and impact of the Holocaust for Judaism. His first book, After Auschwitz, explored radical theological frontiers in Jewish thought. Rubenstein argued that the experience of the Holocaust shattered the traditional Judaic concept of God, especially as the God of the covenant with Abraham, in which the God of Israel is the God of history. Rubenstein argued that Jews could no longer advocate the notion of an omnipotent God at work in history or espouse the election of Israel as the chosen people. In the wake of the Holocaust, he believed that Jews have lost hope and there is no ultimate meaning to life.

[A]s children of the Earth, we are undeceived concerning our destiny. We have lost all hope, consolation and illusion.

In After Auschwitz, Rubenstein argued that the covenant had died. He did not mean he was now an atheist, nor that religion had to be discarded as irrelevant. However, he believed not in a transcendent God, but in God as the ground of being:

Terms like "ground" and "source" stand in contrast to the terms used for the transcendent biblical God of history who is known as a supreme king, a father, a creator, a judge, a maker. When he creates the world, he does so as do males, producing something external to himself. He remains essentially outside of and judges the creative processes he has initiated. As ground and source, God creates as does a mother, in and through her own very substance. As ground of being, God participates in all the joys and sorrows of the drama of creation which is, at the same time, the deepest expression of the divine life. God's unchanging unitary life and that of the cosmos' ever-changing, dynamic multiplicity ultimately reflect a single unitary reality.

Rubenstein explored what the nature and form of religious existence could possibly comprise after Auschwitz (i.e., after the experience of the Holocaust). He suggested that perhaps the way forward was to choose some form of paganism.

When his work was released in 1966, it appeared at a time when a "death of God" movement was emerging in radical theological discussions among Protestant theologians such as Gabriel Vahanian, Paul Van Buren, William Hamilton, and Thomas J. J. Altizer. Among those Protestants, the discussions centred on modern secular unbelief, the collapse of the belief in any transcendent order to the universe, and their implications for Christianity. Theologians such as Altizer felt at the time that "as 'Death of God' theologians we have now been joined by a distinguished Jewish theologian, Dr Richard Rubenstein."

During the 1960s, the "Death of God" movement achieved considerable notoriety and was featured as the cover story of the April 8, 1966, edition of Time magazine. However, as a movement of thought among theologians in Protestant circles, it had dissipated from its novelty by the turn of the 1970s.

=== Unification Church ===
Rubenstein was a defender of the Unification Church and served on its advisory council, as well as on the board of directors of the church-owned The Washington Times newspaper. In the 1990s, he served as president of the University of Bridgeport, which was then affiliated with the church. Rubenstein said about the church's founder Sun Myung Moon:

I especially appreciated Rev. Moon's commitment to the fight against Communism. From his own first-hand, personal experience and out of his religious convictions, he understood how tragic a political and social blight that movement had been. I had been in East and West Berlin the week the Berlin Wall was erected in August 1961 and had visited communist Poland in 1965. Unfortunately, many of my liberal academic colleagues did not understand the full nature of the threat as did Rev. Moon. I was impressed with the sophistication of Rev. Moon's anti-communism. He understood communism's evil, but he also stood ready to meet with communist leaders such as Mikhail Gorbachev and Kim Il Sung in the hope of changing or moderating their views.

== Other writings ==
Rubenstein undertook a psychoanalytic study of Paul the Apostle in his book My Brother Paul, published in 1972. He continued with Holocaust themes in later writings which include The Cunning of History, published in 1975, where he explores how humanity's progression has allowed for the killing of the Jewish people to happen on a massive scale. Over time, Rubenstein would adjust some of his earlier views about God in light of the Kabbalah.

== Works ==
=== Autobiography ===
- Rubenstein, Richard L. (1974). Power Struggle: An Autobiographical Confession. New York: Scribner.

=== Books ===
- Rubenstein, Richard L. (1966). After Auschwitz: Radical Theology and Contemporary Judaism. Indianapolis: Bobbs-Merrill.
- ——— (1970). Morality and Eros. New York: McGraw-Hill.
- ——— (1972). My Brother Paul. New York: Harper and Row. ISBN 978-0-060-67014-6.
- ——— (1975). The Cunning of History: Mass Death and the American Future. New York: Harper and Row. ISBN 978-0061320682.
- ——— (1983). Age of Triage: Fear and Hope in an Overcrowded World. Boston, MA: Beacon. ISBN 9780807043769.
- ——— (1985). The Religious Imagination: A Study in Psychoanalysis and Jewish Theology. Lanham, MD: University Press of America.
- ——— (1987). Dissolving Alliance: The United States and the Future of Europe. New York: Paragon.
- ———, ed. (1987). Spirit Matters: The Worldwide Impact of Religion on Contemporary Politics. New York: Paragon.
- ———; Roth, John K., eds. (1988). The Politics of Latin American Liberation Theology. Washington DC: Washington Institute Press.
- ———; Roth, John K. (1987). Approaches to Auschwitz: The Holocaust and Its Legacy (1st ed.). Atlanta: John Knox Press.
- ———; Roth, John K. (2003). Approaches to Auschwitz: The Holocaust and Its Legacy (2nd ed.). Louisville: Westminster, John Knox Press.
- ——— (2009). Jihad and Genocide: Religion, History, and Human Rights. Lanham, MD: Rowman & Littlefield Publishers. ISBN 978-0-742-56203-5.

== Assessments ==
- Zachary Braiterman, " "Hitler's Accomplice"?: The Tragic Theology of Richard Rubenstein," Modern Judaism, 17/1 (February 1997), pp. 75–89.
- Zachary Braiterman, (God) After Auschwitz (Princeton: Princeton University Press, 1999).
- Jakob Jocz, The Jewish People and Jesus Christ After Auschwitz (Grand Rapids: Baker, 1981).
- Michael Morgan, Beyond Auschwitz: Post-Holocaust Thought in America (New York: Oxford University Press, 2001).
- Betty Rogers Rubenstein and Michael Berenbaum, eds., What Kind of God? Essays in Honor of Richard L. Rubenstein (Lanham: University Press of America, 1995).

== See also ==
- God is dead
- Holocaust theology
- Jewish existentialism
- Sun Myung Moon
- The Washington Times
- Unification Church
- Unification Church of the United States
- University of Bridgeport
