= John K. Roth =

American philosopher

John King Roth is an American-based author, editor, and the Edward J. Sexton Professor Emeritus of Philosophy at Claremont McKenna College (CMC) in Claremont, California. Roth taught at CMC from 1966 through 2006, where he was the founding director of the Center for the Study of the Holocaust, Genocide, and Human Rights, which is now the Mgrublian Center for Human Rights. Best known for his contributions to Holocaust and genocide studies, he is the author or editor of more than fifty books. In 1988, he was named the U.S. National Professor of the Year by the Council for Advancement and Support of Education, and the Carnegie Foundation for the Advancement of Teaching.

== Early life ==
Roth was born in Grand Haven, Michigan, on September 3, 1940. He received his B.A. from Pomona College in 1962, graduating magna cum laude and with honors in philosophy and membership in Phi Beta Kappa. He received his M.A. and Ph.D. in philosophy at Yale University.

== Career ==
After graduating from Yale University, Roth joined the faculty at Claremont McKenna College, where he taught philosophy, with an emphasis on Holocaust and genocide studies. In 1985, Roth joined the economist Gordon Bjork and the political scientist Ward Elliott to initiate what has become a signature program at CMC, the tutorial-based philosophy, politics, and economics major. He has also served as a visiting professor of Holocaust studies at the University of Haifa (Israel) and visiting professor of philosophy at Franklin College (Switzerland) and Doshisha University (Japan). Roth was a Fulbright Lecturer in American studies attached to the Royal Norwegian Ministry of Education, Research, and Church Affairs in Oslo, Norway, from 1995 to 1996. He served as the Robert and Carolyn Frederick Distinguished Visiting Professor of Ethics at DePauw University in Greencastle, Indiana from 2007 to 2008.

Roth's expertise in Holocaust and genocide studies, as well as in philosophy, ethics, American studies, and religious studies, has been advanced by postdoctoral appointments as a Graves Fellow in the Humanities, a Fulbright Lecturer in American Studies at the University of Innsbruck, Austria, and a Fellow of the National Humanities Institute at Yale University. He used a Demonstration Grant from the National Endowment for the Humanities to develop two model interdisciplinary courses: “Perspectives on the American Dream” and “The Holocaust.” With Professor Kenji Yoshida of Doshisha University, Roth received the first Faculty Pairing Grant awarded by the Japan-U.S. Friendship Commission. In 2001, he held the Koerner Visiting Fellowship for the Study of the Holocaust at the Oxford Centre for Hebrew and Jewish Studies in England. From 2004 to 2005, Roth was the Ina Levine Invitational Scholar at the Center for Advanced Holocaust Studies, United States Holocaust Memorial Museum in Washington, D.C.

Roth was a member of the United States Holocaust Memorial Council in Washington, D.C., and he served for many years on the church relations committee at the US Holocaust Memorial Museum. In 1998, he was chosen to direct the Center for Advanced Holocaust Studies at the museum, but he was criticized by national conservative media for some of his past writings, which were characterized as insufficiently supportive of Israel. The academic community largely rallied to his defense and the museum's council voted overwhelmingly to reaffirm his selection, condemning the criticism as "character assassination", but he withdrew from the position.

Roth is a former chair of the California Council for the Humanities and trustee of Humanities Washington, both affiliates of the National Endowment for the Humanities. From 2010 to 2015, he served on the board of the Federation of State Humanities Councils, chairing that board from 2011 to 2013. In addition, Roth chairs the reading committee for the Elie Wiesel Essay Prize in Ethics and is currently active on the editorial boards of the International Journal for Philosophy of Religion, American Journal of Theology & Philosophy, and Holocaust and Genocide Studies. He also is editor of the Issues in Philosophy Series and the Holocaust and Genocide Studies Series published by Paragon House and the Stephen S. Weinstein Series in Post-Holocaust Studies, published by the University of Washington Press.

Roth was involved in a controversy when he wrote in a 1988 op-ed comparing the Israeli right's proposal to expel Palestinians to Nazi policies, suggesting that just as "Kristallnacht happened because a political state decided to be rid of people unwanted within its borders", the same impulse could lead to atrocities committed by Israel.

== Selected works ==
- Advancing Holocaust Studies (Routledge, 2021).
- Ethics During and After the Holocaust: In the Shadow of Birkenau (Palgrave Macmillan, 2005)
- The Failures of Ethics: Confronting the Holocaust, Genocide, and Other Mass Atrocities (Oxford University Press, 2015)
- Losing Trust in the World: Holocaust Scholars Confront Torture (University of Washington Press, 2017)
- The Oxford Handbook of Holocaust Studies (Oxford University Press, 2010)
- Teaching about Rape in War and Genocide (Palgrave Macmillan, 2016)
- Sources of Holocaust Insight: Learning and Teaching about the Genocide (Cascade/Wipf and Stock, 2020)

== Awards ==
- Claremont McKenna College Alumni Association Honorary Lifetime Membership, 1990
- Claremont McKenna College Crocker Award for Excellence, 1980, 1989, 1991, 2004
- Claremont McKenna College G. David Huntoon Senior Teaching Award, 1995
- Claremont McKenna College George C. S. Benson Distinguished Achievement Award, 2004
- Claremont McKenna College Glenn R. Huntoon Award for Superior Teaching, 2006
- Claremont McKenna College Presidential Award for Merit, 1987, 2004
- Council for Advancement and Support of Education and the Carnegie Foundation for the Advancement of Teaching’s U.S. National Professor of the Year, 1988
- Holocaust Educational Foundation’s Distinguished Achievement Award for Holocaust Studies and Research, 2012

== Honorary Degrees ==
- Doctorate of Humane Letters, Grand Valley State University, 1998
- Doctorate of Humane Letters, Hebrew Union College – Jewish Institute of Religion, 1999
- Doctorate of Humane Letters, Indiana University, 1990
- Doctorate of Humane Letters, Transylvania University, 2006
- Doctorate of Humane Letters, Western University of Health Sciences, 1999
