= Millat Ibrahim =

Quranic term

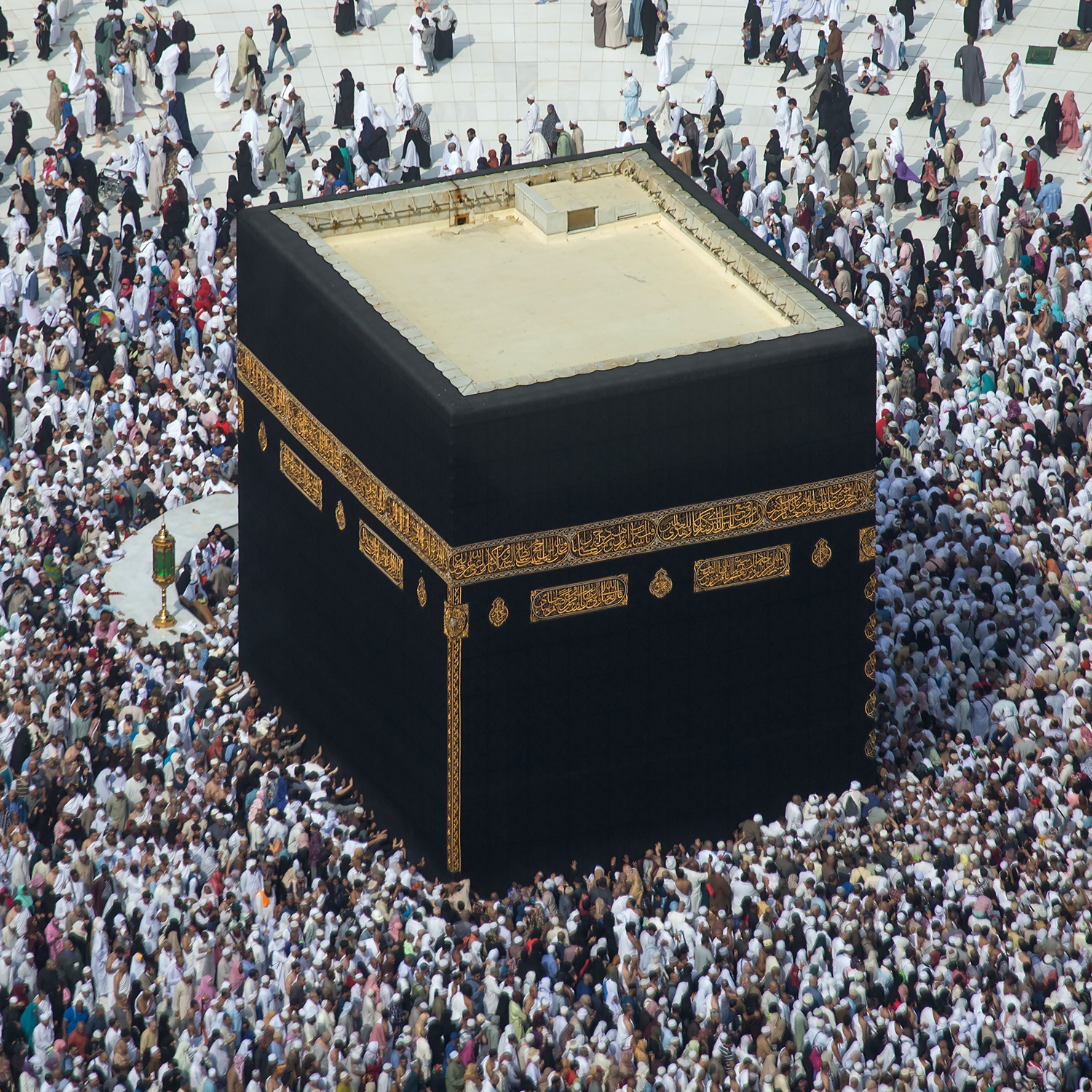
The Kaaba, built by Ibrahim and his son Ismail, according to the Islamic doctrine.

The Millat Ibrahim (Arabic: مِلَّةُ إِبْرَاهِيْمَ, romanized: Millatu ʾIbrāhīm) is the Quranic term denoting the ideology of the Islamic prophet Ibrahim in the Quran and how he reached them after his intellectual and spiritual journey. According to the Islamic doctrine, it is generally the early form of the Islamic faith. (Q 22:78)

The Quran tells about his experiences in the quest for the truth. How he first considered a star, moon and sun as his gods but rejected them as mere creatures and how he finally believed in their Creator (Quran 6:76-79). Islamic scholars such as Ibn Kathir state that this episode is to be viewed as Abraham debating with and responding to the claims of his people; Imam ibn Kathir writes in his Tafsir ibn Kathir, "We should note here that, in these Ayat, Ibrahim, peace be upon him, was debating with his people, explaining to them the error of their way in worshipping idols and images. ... When he proved that these three objects were not gods, although they are the brightest objects the eyes can see, (he said: "O my people! I am indeed free from all that you join as partners in worship with Allah.") meaning, I am free from worshipping these objects and from taking them as protectors. Therefore, if they are indeed gods as you claim, then all of you bring your plot against me and do not give me respite."

The word Millah is used in 15 different verses of Quran. Ten of them (2:120, 2:130, 2:135, 3:95, 4:125, 6:161, 12:37, 12:38, 16:123, 22:78) refers, either directly or indirectly, to Ibrahim.

== See also ==
- Abrahamic religions
- Hanif
