= Jihad and Genocide =

2011 book by Richard L. Rubenstein

Jihad and Genocide: Religion, History, and Human Rights
- Author: Richard L. Rubenstein
- Language: English
- Series: Studies in Genocide: Religion, History, and Human Rights
- Subject: Jihad and Genocide
- Genre: Islamic history
- Publisher: Rowman & Littlefield Publishers
- Publication date: May 16, 2011
- Publication place: Israel
- Media type: Print (Hardcover, Paperback), E-book
- Pages: 262
- ISBN: 978-0742562035
- OCLC: 1148150634

Jihad and Genocide is a 2011 book by Richard L. Rubenstein.

== Synopsis ==
According to Michael Berenbaum writing in The Jewish Daily Forward, the book explores the question "do Islamic leaders mean what they say" when they call for the genocide of the Jews?

According to Berenbaum, Rubenstein "offers compelling evidence that significant and prominent Muslim thinkers mean what they say and say what they mean when they speak of world peace only following Islamic world conquest."

Rubenstein concluded: "Muslim ire has been aroused. At least among Islamists. It will not be calmed until the shame and the disgrace of Muslim defeats from the Battle of Lepanto (1571) to the 1947–1949 Palestine war (1948) and the Six-Day War (1967) have been erased. If we take the Islamists at their word, nothing less than genocide would suffice."

== Motivation ==
In an essay entitled, "Why I Have Written "Jihad and Genocide"", Rubenstein explains that for most of his adult life he "believed that the Arab-Israeli conflict was primarily a dispute over territory that might with time, patience, and compromise be amenable to a viable solution both sides could live with." He goes on to discuss the process by which he began to listen to and take Muslims "at their word."
