= Aaron W. Hughes =

Canadian academic and religious studies scholar

- Born: August 15, 1968 (age 58); Edmonton, Alberta
- Occupation: Academic

Academic background
- Education: The University of Alberta

Academic work
- Discipline: Religious studies
- Sub-discipline: Islamic studies
- Institutions: University of Rochester; Faculty of Oriental Studies University of Oxford; University at Buffalo; University of Calgary
- Website: Official website

Aaron W. Hughes is a Canadian academic in the field of religious studies and history. He holds the Dean's Professor of the Humanities and is the Philip S. Bernstein Professor in the Department of Religion and Classics at the University of Rochester. He was the Gordon and Gretchen Gross Professor at the University at Buffalo, State University of New York from 2009 to 2012, and, from 2001 to 2009, professor of religious studies at the University of Calgary in Alberta, Canada.

== Biography ==
The son of William Hughes and Sadie Alley, Aaron Hughes was born on August 15, 1968 in Edmonton, AB. His father was a native of Glasgow, Scotland and his mother was born in Fort Simpson, NWT to parents from Srifa, Lebanon.

Hughes received a B.A. in Religious studies at the University of Alberta in 1993. He then went to the department of religious studies at Indiana University in Bloomington, where he received a M.A. in 1995 and a Ph.D. in 2000 for a dissertation entitled Philosophy's Mythos: Aesthetics, the Imagination, and the Philosophical Novel on Medieval Jewish and Islamic Thought. This was subsequently published as The Texture of the Divine: Imagination in Medieval Islamic and Jewish Thought (Indiana University Press, 2004) and was one of three finalists for a Koret Jewish Book Award in the Thought/Philosophy category.

== Career ==
Hughes is a scholar of three interrelated fields of research: Jewish studies, Islamic studies, and theory and method in the study of religion.

=== Islamic studies ===
Hughes has primarily been interested in critiquing what he regards as the overly apologetical and ecumenical approach to Islamic Studies. Two of his books take aim at the field: Situating Islam and Theorizing Islam. Hughes has also attempted a corrective with his Muslim Identities, which is an attempt to provide an introduction to Islam in ways that eschews the approaches of scholars like Fred Denny and John Esposito. Writing in the Journal of Islamic Studies, Murad Wilfried Hofmann describes Hughes' Muslim Identities as "the very best introduction currently available in English for non-Muslims seeking a sound approach to Islam." However, writing in the Review of Middle East Studies, Peter Matthews Wright criticized the author's uneven tone and reversion to language that undermines Hughes' stated aims.

In 2022, his work on medieval Islam—An Anxious Inheritance was published.

In 2023, he was the inaugural co-editor for the Journal of Religious Minorities Under Muslim Rule (JRMMR).

=== Theory and method in religious studies ===
Hughes was co-editor of Method and Theory in the Study of Religion (MTSR). He was the editor of the Academy Series, published by Oxford University Press for the American Academy of Religion, and co-editor for the Library of Contemporary Jewish Philosophers.

=== Canadian studies ===
In 2020, Hughes published From Seminary to University: An Institutional History of the Study of Religion in Canada with University of Toronto Press. The book offers the first history of the study of religion in Canada.

This was followed in 2022 by 10 Days that Shaped Modern Canada, which he wrote during the COVID-19 pandemic while a visiting fellow at the University of Oxford. The latter work chose 10 significant days in Canadian history over the past 50 years and the events and their impact.

Hughes has subsequently written on the papal apology in Maskwacis, Alberta, and as of 2023 was writing a biography of the Canadian Charter of Rights and Freedoms.

== Books ==
=== Authored ===
- Hughes, Aaron W. (18 November 2003). The Texture of the Divine: Imagination in Medieval Islamic and Jewish Thought. Indiana University Press. ISBN 0253343534.
- Hughes, Aaron W. (1 January 2005). Jewish Philosophy A-Z. Edinburgh University Press. ISBN 0748621776.
- Hughes, Aaron W. (17 December 2007). The Art of Dialogue in Jewish Philosophy. Indiana University Press. ISBN 978-0253219442.
- Hughes, Aaron (15 January 2008). Situating Islam. Equinox Publishing. ISBN 978-1845532604.
- Hughes, Aaron W. (29 October 2010). The Invention of Jewish Identity: Bible, Philosophy, and the Art of Translation. Indiana University Press. ISBN 978-0253222497.
- Hughes, Aaron W. (8 August 2014). Theorizing Islam: Disciplinary Deconstruction and Reconstruction. Routledge. ISBN 978-1908049360.
- Hughes, Aaron W. (15 November 2012). Abrahamic Religions: On the Uses and Abuses of History. Oxford University Press. ISBN 978-0199934645.
- Hughes, Aaron W. (23 April 2013). Muslim Identities: An Introduction to Islam. Columbia University Press. ISBN 978-0231161473 – via Amazon.
- Hughes, Philip S. Bernstein Chair of Jewish Studies Aaron W. (1 October 2013). The Study of Judaism: Authenticity, Identity, Scholarship. State University of New York Press. ISBN 978-1438448619.
- Hughes, Aaron W. (3 February 2014). Rethinking Jewish Philosophy: Beyond Particularism and Universalism. Oxford University Press. ISBN 978-0199356812.
- Hughes, Aaron W. (2015). Islam and the Tyranny of Authenticity: An Inquiry into Disciplinary Apologetics and Self-deception. Equinox Publishing Limited. ISBN 978-1781792179.
- Hughes, Aaron W. (19 November 2015). Jacob Neusner on Religion: The Example of Judaism. Routledge. ISBN 9781138949393 – via Amazon.
- fHughes, Aaron W. (13 September 2016). Jacob Neusner: An American Jewish Iconoclast. NYU Press. ISBN 9781479885855.
- Hughes, Aaron W. (September 2017). Shared Identities: Medieval and Modern Imaginings of Judeo-Islam. Oxford University Press. ISBN 9780190684464.
- Hughes, Aaron W. (2017). Comparison: A Critical Primer. Equinox Publishing Limited. ISBN 9781781795378.
- Hughes, Aaron W. (30 June 2020). Muslim and Jew: Origins, Growth, Resentment. Taylor & Francis. ISBN 9780367606626.
- Hughes, Aaron W. (2020). From Seminary to University: An Institutional History of the Study of Religion in Canada. University of Toronto Press. ISBN 9781487504977. Archived from the original on 2021-05-13.
- Hughes, Aaron W. (2021). Somewhere between Islam and Judaism: Critical Reflections. Equinox Publishing Limited. ISBN 9781800500556.
- Muslim Identities: An Introduction to Islam. 2nd ed. Sheffield: Equinox, 2022.
- 10 Days That Shaped Modern Canada. Edmonton: University of Alberta Press, 2022.
- An Anxious Inheritance: Religious Others and the Shaping of Sunnī Orthodoxy. Oxford: Oxford University Press, 2022.
- Hughes, Aaron W.; McCutcheon, Russell T. (16 September 2021). Religion in 50 Words: A Critical Vocabulary. Routledge, Taylor & Francis. ISBN 9780367690472.

=== Edited ===
- Hughes, Aaron W., ed. (2010). Defining Judaism: A Reader. Equinox. ISBN 9781845536091.
- Hughes, Aaron W.; Wolfson, Elliot R., eds. (22 December 2009). New Directions in Jewish Philosophy. Indiana University Press. ISBN 978-0253221643.
- Diamond, Professor James A.; Hughes, Philip S. Bernstein Chair of Jewish Studies Aaron W., eds. (1 August 2012). Encountering the Medieval in Modern Jewish Thought. Brill. ISBN 978-9004233508.
- Hughes, Aaron W., ed. (25 September 2013). Theory and Method in the Study of Religion: Twenty-Five Years On. Brill. ISBN 9789004256019.
- Ben Zvi, Ehud; Camp, Claudia V.; Gunn, David M.; Hughes, Aaron W., eds. (13 August 2015). Poets, Prophets, and Texts in Play: Studies in Biblical Poetry and Prophecy in Honor of Francis Landy. Bloomsbury Academic. ISBN 9780567224095.
- Tirosh-Samuelson, Hava; Hughes, Aaron W., eds. (21 August 2014). Jewish Philosophy for the Twenty-First Century: Personal Reflections. Brill. ISBN 9789004279612.
- McCutcheon, Russell T.; Hughes, Aaron W., eds. (2017). Religion in Five Minutes. Equinox Publishing Limited. ISBN 9781781794647.
- Hughes, Aaron W., ed. (2017). Theory in a Time of Excess: Beyond Reflection and Explanation in Religious Studies Scholarship. Equinox Publishing Limited. ISBN 9781781794234.
- Tirosh-Samuelson, Hava; Hughes, Aaron W., eds. (13 August 2018). The Future of Jewish Philosophy. Brill. ISBN 9789004381209.
- Tirosh-Samuelson, Hava; Hughes, Aaron W. (eds.). "Library of Contemporary Jewish Philosophy". Library of Contemporary Jewish Philosophers. ISSN 2213-6010.
- Robinson, James T.; Hughes, Aaron W., eds. (2019). Medieval Jewish Philosophy and Its Literary Forms. Indiana University Press. ISBN 9780253042521.
- Daneshgar, Majid; Hughes, Aaron W., eds. (2020). Deconstructing Islamic Studies. Ilex Foundation. ISBN 9780674244689.
- What Is Religion?: Debating the Academic Study of Religion (with Russell T. McCutcheon). Oxford: Oxford University Press, 2021.
- New Methods in the Study of Islam (with Abbas Aghdassi). Edinburgh: Edinburgh University Press, 2022.
