= Holocaust theology =

Theological and philosophical debate

Holocaust theology is a body of theological and philosophical debate concerning the role of God in the universe in light of the Holocaust of the late 1930s and early 1940s. The exploration of Holocaust theology is primarily found within Judaism, but also exists within Christianity. Some prominent Holocaust theologies include viewing the Holocaust as divine retribution for sin, as evidence of the death of God, as an expression of human free will, or as an attempt by humans to kill god.

Holocaust theology itself has been studied by scholars as a religio-cultural phenomenon.

== Orthodox Jewish responses ==
=== Biblical origin ===
A number of theologians and commentators have identified Hitler as an Amalekite. According to the Hebrew Bible, at the Battle of Refidim, the Amalekites targeted and killed weak Israelites. As a result, God decreed Amalek to be obliterated "from beneath the heavens" (Deuteronomy 25:19). The Hebrew Bible connects "Haman the son of Hammedatha the Agagite" (Esther 3:1), the genocidal antagonist of the Book of Esther, to Agag, king of Amalek, whom the Israelites failed to kill (I Samuel 15:9). Reflecting on these verses, some argue that Hitler can be seen as a result of this failure. Others argue he should be seen as a "symbolic" Amalekite.

== Haredi and Hardal ==
Rabbi Elazar Shach has described the Holocaust as divine punishment for the sins of the Jewish people and for the abandoning of religious observance for the enlightenment. He caused outrage in the secular Israeli press by claiming that "the Holy One, blessed be He, kept score for hundreds of years until it added up to six million Jews". Haredi MKs later said his comments had been misconstrued. Shach believed that the secularism of some Israelis would cause another Holocaust, and argued that if the Israeli Education Ministry were to be placed in the hands of Meretz MK Shulamit Aloni, it would result in "over a million Israeli children being forced into apostasy, and that would be worse than what had happened to Jewish children during the Holocaust".

Some Messianist Zionists, including Mordecai Atiyah, have claimed the Holocaust was a collective punishment for ongoing Jewish unfaithfulness to God. Zvi Yehuda Kook has viewed the Holocaust as an expression of God's divine wrath, writing: "When the end comes and Israel fails to recognize it, there comes a cruel divine operation that removes [the Jewish people] from its exile.

In 1939, Chaim Ozer Grodzinski stated that the Nazi persecution of the Jews was the fault of non-Orthodox Jews, a view shared by Eliyahu Eliezer Dessler.

=== Chabad ===
In 1980, Menachem Mendel Schneerson, the seventh Rebbe of Chabad Lubavitch wrote:

"It is clear that 'no evil descends from Above,' and buried within torment and suffering is a core of exalted spiritual good. Not all human beings are able to perceive it, but it is very much there. So it is not impossible for the physical destruction of the Holocaust to be spiritually beneficial. On the contrary, it is quite possible that physical affliction is good for the spirit" ("Mada Ve'emuna," Machon Lubavitch, 1980, Kfar Chabad)

He then went on to compare it to a Surgeon who amputates limbs to save the life of a patient:

"[The limb] is incurably diseased... God, like the professor-surgeon... seeks the good of Israel, and indeed, all He does is done for the good.... In the spiritual sense, no harm was done, because the everlasting spirit of the Jewish people was not destroyed." ("Mada Ve'emuna," Machon Lubavitch, 1980, Kfar Chabad)

In later years, Schneerson revised his opinion, arguing that no explanation provided by human reason can afford a satisfactory theodicy of Auschwitz, especially no explanation along the lines of divine punition.

== Works by Jewish theologians ==
=== Richard Rubenstein ===
Rabbi Richard Rubenstein's original piece on this issue, After Auschwitz, held that the only intellectually honest response to the Holocaust is to reject God, and to recognize that all existence is ultimately meaningless. According to this piece, there is no divine plan or purpose, no God that reveals His will to humankind, and God does not care about the world. Humans must assert and create their own value in life. This view has been rejected by Jews of all religious denominations, but his works were widely read in the Jewish community in the 1970s. Since that time Rubenstein has begun to move away from this view; his later works affirm a form of deism in which one may believe that God may exist as the basis for reality and some also include Kabbalistic notions of the nature of God.

No man can really say that God is dead. How can we know that? Nevertheless, I am compelled to say that we live in the time of the "death of God". This is more a statement about man and his culture than about God. The death of God is a cultural fact ... When I say we live in the time of the death of God, I mean that the thread uniting God and man, heaven and earth, has been broken ...

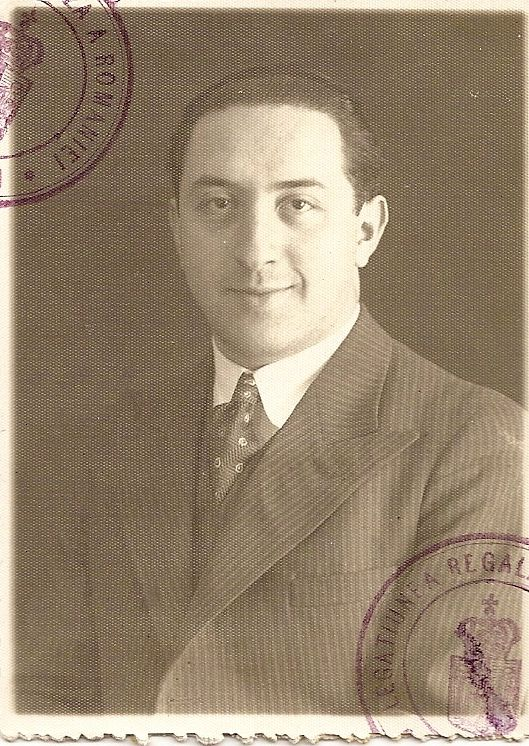
Eliezer Berkovits

=== Eliezer Berkovits ===
Eliezer Berkovits held that man's free will depends on God's decision to remain hidden. If God were to reveal himself in history and hold back the hand of tyrants, man's free will would be rendered non-existent. This is a view that is loosely based on the kabbalistic concept of nahama d'kissufa (bread of shame) - the idea that greater satisfaction is achieved when one becomes deserving of a blessing rather than when it is given as a gift. Kabbalah teaches that this is one of the reasons God created humans with free will and with obligations, and that in order to maintain that free will, God reduces the extent to which he manifests himself in the world (tzimtzum).

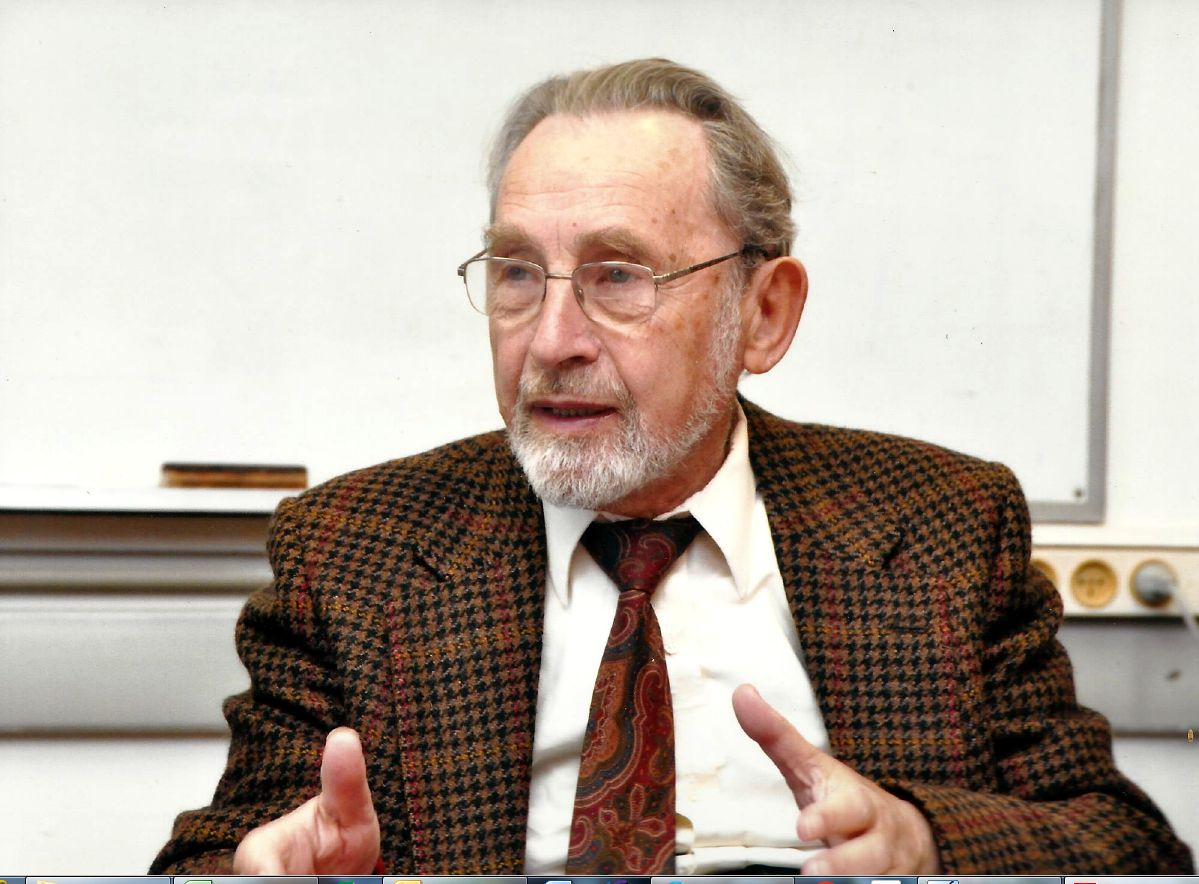
David Weiss Halivni

=== David Weiss Halivni ===
David Weiss Halivni, a Holocaust survivor from Hungary, says that the effort to associate the Shoah and sin is morally outrageous. He holds that it is unwarranted on a strict reading of the Tanakh. He claims that it reinforces an alarming tendency among ultra-Orthodox leaders to exploit such arguments on behalf of their own authority. In "Prayer in the Shoah" he gives his response to the idea that the Holocaust was a punishment from God:

What happened in the Shoah is above and beyond measure (l'miskpat): above and beyond suffering, above and beyond any punishment. There is no transgression that merits such punishment... and it cannot be attributed to sin."

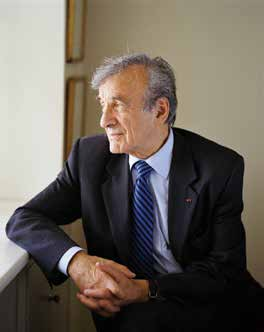
Elie Wiesel

=== Elie Wiesel ===
A Romanian Jewish-American writer, professor, political activist, Nobel laureate, and Holocaust survivor Elie Wiesel was the author of 57 books, including Night, a work based on his experiences as a prisoner in the Auschwitz, Buna, and Buchenwald concentration camps. Wiesel's 1979 play The Trial of God is about a trial in which God is the defendant, and is reportedly based on events that Wiesel himself witnessed as a teenager in Auschwitz. Over the course of the trial, a number of arguments are made, both for and against God's guilt. Wiesel's theological stance, illustrated through the intuitive possibilities of literature, is a theology of existentialist protest, which neither denies God, nor accepts theodicies. Regarding the theme of protest in particular, Menachem Mendel Schneerson maintained a correspondence with Wiesel, urging him to perceive faith (emunah) as the transcendental precondition of authentic protest. In one of his books, Norman Lamm treats Wiesel's theological novel, The Town Beyond the Wall, to literary, theological and Judaic commentary. The novel's protagonists symbolically proceed through a range of theological views, which Wiesel's Midrashic-style literature can explore where theodicy fails. The ending sees the hope of renewed mystical reconciliation with God.

== Post-Holocaust theology and child abuse theology ==
David R. Blumenthal, in his book Facing the Abusing God (1993), has drawn on data from the field of child abuse and with it, he has proposed the "worship of God through protest" as a legitimate response to injustice by survivors of both the Holocaust and child abuse.

Another writer who has addressed survivors of the Holocaust and child abuse is John K. Roth, whose essay "A Theodicy of Protest" is included in Encountering Evil: Live Options in Theodicy (1982).

== Works by important Christian theologians ==
=== Jürgen Moltmann ===
In The Crucified God Jürgen Moltmann speaks of how in a theology after Auschwitz the traditional notion of God needed to be revised:

Shattered and broken, the survivors of my generation were then returning from camps and hospitals to the lecture room. A theology which did not speak of God in the sight of the one who was abandoned and crucified would have had nothing to say to us then.

The traditional notion of an impassible unmoved mover had died in those camps and was no longer tenable. Moltmann proposes instead a crucified God who is both a suffering and protesting God. That is, God is not detached from suffering but willingly enters into human suffering in compassion.

God in Auschwitz and Auschwitz in the crucified God – that is the basis for real hope that both embraces and overcomes the world.

This is in contrast both with the move of theism to justify God's actions and the move of atheism to accuse God. Moltmann's trinitarian theology of the cross instead says that God is a protesting God who opposes the gods of this world of power and domination by entering into human pain and suffering on the cross and on the gallows of Auschwitz. Moltmann's theology of the cross was later developed into liberation theologies from suffering people under Stalinism in Eastern Europe and military dictatorships in South America and South Korea.

=== Pope Benedict XVI ===
On his visit to the extermination camp of Auschwitz, Pope Benedict XVI gave an address and prayer, which begins by acknowledging the impossibility of an adequate theological response:

In a place like this, words fail; in the end, there can only be a dread silence – a silence which is itself a heartfelt cry to God: Why, Lord, did you remain silent? How could you tolerate all this? In silence, then, we bow our heads before the endless line of those who suffered and were put to death here; yet our silence becomes in turn a plea for forgiveness and reconciliation, a plea to the living God never to let this happen again.

Nonetheless, he proposes that the actions of the Nazis can be seen as having been motivated by a hatred of God and a desire to exalt human power, with the Holocaust serving as a means by which to erase witness to God and his Law:

The rulers of the Third Reich wanted to crush the entire Jewish people, to cancel it from the register of the peoples of the earth. Thus the words of the Psalm: "We are being killed, accounted as sheep for the slaughter" were fulfilled in a terrifying way. Deep down, those vicious criminals, by wiping out this people, wanted to kill the God who called Abraham, who spoke on Sinai and laid down principles to serve as a guide for mankind, principles that are eternally valid. If this people, by its very existence, was a witness to the God who spoke to humanity and took us to himself, then that God finally had to die and power had to belong to man alone – to those men, who thought that by force they had made themselves masters of the world. By destroying Israel, by the Shoah, they ultimately wanted to tear up the taproot of the Christian faith and to replace it with a faith of their own invention: faith in the rule of man, the rule of the powerful.

Most coverage of the address was positive, with praise from Italian and Polish rabbis. The Simon Wiesenthal Center called the visit historic, and the address and prayers "a repudiation of antisemitism and a repudiation of those... who refer to the Holocaust as a myth".

== Criticisms ==
A few Jewish commentators have objected to what they perceive as a desire to Christianize the Holocaust. There is debate as to whether Holocaust theology has contributed to the betterment of Jewish-Christian relations. Certain commentators have also criticized a tendency to historicize and dogmatize certain political or secular events such as the Holocaust, which are not part of theology as traditionally understood, with the effect of attempting both to locate God's activity within history, and to embed it within wider political rhetoric.

Yehuda Bauer considered Holocaust theology "fascinating" but a "dead end".

== See also ==
- Problem of evil
  - Religious responses to the problem of evil
- Dietrich Bonhoeffer
- Norman Finkelstein
- Maximilian Kolbe
- Dorothee Sölle
- Edith Stein
- Elie Wiesel
