= Uppsala Programme for Holocaust and Genocide Studies =

Academic institute at Uppsala University

The Uppsala Programme for Holocaust and Genocide Studies (Swedish: Programmet för studier kring Förintelsen och folkmord) was an academic institute conducting research in Holocaust and genocide studies. It was a part of the Centre for Multiethnic Research of the Faculty of Philosophy and History at Uppsala University. As part of its national information campaign focusing on the Holocaust and genocide, the Swedish government financed the Uppsala Programme for Holocaust and Genocide Studies. Housed within the Centre for Multiethnic Research of the Faculty of History and Philosophy, the Programme commenced its research and educational activities in 1998. The Programme was guided by a three-part mandate: research and publication, documentation, and continuing education, primarily of teachers. Additional funding was provided by the Uppsala University Rector's office. Studies were published by the programme in international journals as well as in publications of the university like Studia Multiethnica Upsaliensia, Uppsala Multiethnic Papers and Acta Sueco-Polonica.

The programme was cooperating with academic institutions through research and pedagogical exchange both within Sweden and with universities in Australia, Germany, France, Israel, Canada, Poland, the United Kingdom and the United States.

In January 2010, the Programme merged with the Centre for Multiethnic Research into the Hugo Valentin Centre, named after the Swedish historian Hugo Valentin. The main focus under this name was research on the Holocaust and genocide as well as research on ethnicity and the national minorities in the Nordic region. In January 2025, the Centre was renamed the Uppsala Centre for Holocaust and Genocide Studies.
