= How Holocausts Happen =

Book by Douglas V. Porpora

- Second edition cover of How Holocausts Happen
- Author: Douglas V. Porpora
- Language: English
- Publisher: Temple University
- Publication date: 1990
- Publication place: United States
- ISBN: 0-87722-750-0
- OCLC: 21153568
- Dewey Decimal: 327.730728 20
- LC Class: F1439.5 .P67 1990

How Holocausts Happen is a book by Douglas V. Porpora that deals with the United States involvement in Central America in regards to their participation in the genocidal policies of Nicaraguan counterrevolutionary forces and the reaction of the general public to the Holocaust in Nazi Germany.

== Author information ==
Douglas V. Porpora is chair of the Department of Psychology, Sociology, and Anthropology at Drexel University. He is an active member of NETWORK, a national social justice lobby, and is the author of three other books, The Concept of Social Structure (1987), Landscapes of the Soul: The Loss of Moral Meaning in American Life (2001), and Transcendence: Critical Realism and God (2004).

== Focus of the book ==
Unlike other accounts of the Holocaust and genocide, How Holocausts Happen focuses on the citizenry served or ruled by genocidal governments rather than on the governments themselves. Porpora argues that moral indifference and lack of interest in critical reflection are key factors that enable Holocaust-like events to happen. He characterizes American society as typically being indifferent to the fate of other people, uninformed, and anti-intellectual. Porpora cites numerous examples of U.S.-backed Latin American government actions against their own peasants, Indians, and dissident factions. He offers a theory of public moral indifference and argues that although such indifference is socially created by government, the media, churches, and other institutions, the public must ultimately take responsibility for it. How Holocausts Happen is at once a scholarly examination of the nature of genocide and an indictment of American society.
