= The Holocaust in curricula =

The Holocaust in curricula discusses the ways in which the Holocaust is presented in secondary school level history and social studies curricula worldwide. It is a key component of education about the Holocaust. The status of the Holocaust in curricula varies considerably worldwide. A leading publication on the subject, The International status of education about the Holocaust: a global mapping of textbooks and curricula, reveals four main categories of curricula in respect of the Holocaust: Direct Reference, Partial Reference, Context Only, and No Reference.

== Direct reference ==
"Direct reference" refers to countries whose curricula stipulate teaching about the Holocaust by using the term "Holocaust" or "Shoah", or by using alternative terminologies such as "genocide against the Jews", or "Nazi persecution of minorities":

1. The terms "Holocaust" and "Shoah" are used explicitly. While most curricula employ the term "Holocaust" (in Albania, Australia, Denmark, Ethiopia and Poland, for example), some use "Shoah" (Belgium (Flanders), Côte d'Ivoire, Italy and Luxembourg); or the two terms are used as synonyms (in Switzerland (canton of Bern), in Germany (Saxony) and in Argentina). In many countries, the two terms appear within the context of the Second World War (this is the most frequent category found in the majority of European countries, in Australia, in several US states, in Chile, Ethiopia, Singapore, South Africa, and Trinidad and Tobago). Additionally, in some cases, the Holocaust is mentioned in teaching units devoted to genocidal crimes (in Canada (Ontario), in Panama and in the US (Arkansas)).
2. The Holocaust is referred to directly, but using alternative terms such as "the singularity of the Jewish genocide" in Spain, the "Nazi policy of extermination" in Andorra, the "extermination of Jews" (Belgium (Wallonia)), "genocide of the Jews" (France, Germany (Lower Saxony)), "mass murder of [...] Jews" (Trinidad and Tobago), "persecution of Jews" (Singapore) and "Final Solution" (Namibia). Another country in which there is no direct reference to the Holocaust, but where the contextualization of themes related to the Holocaust or local terminological usage makes it clear that the Holocaust is in fact stipulated, is Turkey, where soykırım (genocide) is the standard term used to refer to the Holocaust, and where terms analogous to "Holocaust" or "Shoah" are strictly avoided to emphasize the uniqueness of the genocide against the Jews in contradistinction to the massacre of Armenians in 1915 and 1916, which occurred at a time before the term genocide came into use.

== Partial reference ==
"Partial reference" refers to countries whose curricula stipulate teaching about the Holocaust indirectly to achieve a learning aim which is not primarily the history of the Holocaust (concerning responses to the Holocaust outside Europe, for example) or to illustrate a topic other than the Holocaust (where the Holocaust is mentioned as one among other aspects of human rights education, for example). Most commonly, the Holocaust is named in the curriculum as a means to other ends, such that its historical meaning and complexity are not addressed. For example, in Argentina, Belize, Colombia, Ecuador, Mexico and Slovenia, the Holocaust appears as an example of violations of human rights, and is sometimes relegated to footnotes. Similarly, in the US (Maryland), pupils are required to "explain the events that led to the beginning of the Second World War", and to "investigate the response of the United States government to the discovery of the Holocaust and immigration policies with respect to refugees"; in Canada (Prince Edward Island and Nova Scotia), pupils are required only to study responses to the Holocaust in Canada.

== Context only ==
"Context only" refers to countries whose curricula refer to the Second World War or to National Socialism, without referring explicitly to the Holocaust:

1. The context in which the Holocaust took place is mentioned without direct reference to the event itself. The curricula of Sri Lanka and India contain references to the "Results/ impact of Nazism" or the "Consequences/results/impact of World War II". Botswana, Burkina Faso, Kenya, Malaysia, Niger, Norway, Pakistan, Peru, Senegal and Uruguay contain similarly indirect contextualizations. More direct references to the context occur in the Zimbabwean curriculum, which requires pupils to, "Discuss injustices practised by the Nazis and Fascists", and refers to "human rights violation" and "atrocities against minorities and conquered nations". The Rwandan curriculum, to name another example, requires pupils to "compare the phenomenon between [sic] Fascism and Nazism and what took place in Rwanda", and refers to "Nazi doctrines", "loss of human life", the "comparative study of various genocides", and "stages of genocide"; the curriculum of the Democratic Republic of the Congo likewise refers to "the harmful effects of Nazism"; the Costa Rican curriculum refers to "antisemitism and racial superiority: the case of Jews, Muslims, Slavs and Gypsies".
2. The Holocaust is not mentioned in the curriculum, although it does feature in textbooks (for example, in Botswana, El Salvador, Georgia, India, Japan, Norway, Republic of Korea, Rwanda, in some Swiss cantons and in Uruguay).

Reporting by The Sunday Telegraph in 2026 recorded similar patterns in Qatar, where state-approved textbooks used in some international private schools omitted explicit reference to The Holocaust in sections on Nazi Germany and World War II. The textbooks summarized the aims and ideology of Adolf Hitler as "to establish a national army, unite the Germans, and reclaim German colonies," encouraged students to read his book Mein Kampf, and only vaguely referred to his "racist ideas." A teacher in one of these schools stated, "We are not allowed to mention Jews. The genocide didn't happen to them. It is like brainwashing," adding that "some Arabic students would even 'glorify' Hitler and write praise for him in their textbooks."

== No reference ==
"No reference" is when neither the Holocaust as a term and event nor its context is mentioned in the curriculum. It is frequently the case in this category that curricula do not stipulate specific content for history teaching, but rather simply discuss the necessity and purpose of the school subjects of history or social studies and the teaching methods to be used. This is the case in Brunei Darussalam, Dominica, Fiji, Iceland and Thailand.

== Idiosyncrasies ==
Several curricula do not entirely conform to any recognizable pattern and therefore require further explanation. These may be categorized as follows.

=== Federal education systems ===
One example is Switzerland, where education about the Holocaust is obligatory but not contained in the curricula of all regions and cantons because, as Davis and Rubinstein-Avila suggest, no constraints on how this event should be taught are imposed in the face of a complex national story; in Switzerland, for example, Jews were partially accepted as refugees, partly turned away at the border, and the banks collaborated with the Nazi regime. Here, a "self-reflexive approach" is taken to teaching about the Holocaust. The Brazilian Ministry of Education issues national guidelines which stipulate teaching about the Holocaust. However, these guidelines are not binding and function only as recommendations whose content can be adapted and extended locally. Curricula for the primary school level at age nine in Brazil are provided on a municipal level, whereas the provincial states determine curricula content for the secondary school level, while schools have the final decision over what is actually taught in classrooms. Following attacks on synagogues and Jewish cemeteries, Porto Alegre was the first municipality to introduce compulsory education about the Holocaust for all public schools in 2010.

=== Curricula in a state of transition ===
The history curriculum of 2003 in Finland prescribes the teaching of "European extremist movements, the crisis of democracy and persecution of people [in] different countries; the Second World War and its consequences", and thus contains only the context but no direct reference to the Holocaust. However, amendments made by the Ministry of Education in 2010 have led to a shift towards a more explicit stipulation of teaching about the Holocaust in the context of human rights education. In the section concerning ethics for school years seven to nine, the curriculum stipulates the teaching of "human rights violations such as the Holocaust"; in the section devoted to history, "human rights, human rights violations such as genocide, the Holocaust, and persecution of people in different countries". Likewise, in the section concerning ethics, the curriculum for upper secondary school levels stipulates teaching about "human rights, human rights conventions and their history, human rights violations such as the Holocaust", and in the section on history, "human rights, genocide, the Holocaust and persecution of people in different countries". This testifies to a shift towards contextualized teaching about the Holocaust, with only one section of the upper-level history curriculum stipulating direct education about the history of the Holocaust.

=== Irregular naming of victim groups ===
Mentions of the Holocaust are frequently not accompanied by clear references to groups of victims (examples in this context are Australia, Bulgaria, Canada (Alberta), Ethiopia, Italy, Mexico and US (Texas)). In some curricula, Jews are the only group of victims named (the curricula of the Walloon and German authorities in Belgium, Côte d'Ivoire, Germany (Bavaria), Hungary and Panama); others point out the connection of the Holocaust to antisemitism [Albania, Canada (Ontario), Ireland, Liechtenstein, Namibia, Portugal and Spain], or make explicit mention of several groups of victims such as Sinti and Roma (Costa Rica, Ecuador, France, South Africa, Trinidad and Tobago and US (California)), homosexuals (South Africa, Trinidad and Tobago, and the US (California)), political opponents (South Africa and the German Land of Lower Saxony) and further groups subsumed under "other minorities" (Germany (Lower Saxony and North Rhine-Westphalia), Namibia, Singapore and Swaziland) or summarized as "others who failed to meet the Aryan ideal" (California).

=== Curriculum annexes ===
Côte d'Ivoire does not include the Holocaust as part of the core curriculum, but makes explicit reference to it in an example syllabus in the appendix to the curriculum.

=== Curriculum outside classrooms ===
Curriculum outside classrooms involves learning outside the school in different contexts including: museum exhibitions, libraries, cultural events, television, and sites of collective memory. For example, Museums and Memorials can be particularly important spaces for education because they provide a learning experience, as well as space for commemoration and reflection. Besides their primary remembrance dimension, many memorial museums, whether situated on historic sites of persecution or not, have functions that relate to research and documentation, culture and advocacy and education.

== Connection to textbooks ==
The Holocaust in textbooks discusses the ways in which the Holocaust is conceptualized and narrated in textbooks. Textbooks can be analyzed focusing in particular on the temporal and spatial scales, protagonists, interpretative paradigms, narrative techniques, didactic methods and national idiosyncrasies with and within which the Holocaust is conveyed. Curricula and textbooks, in particular those designed for history teaching, provide both a space for the formation of a condensed canon of knowledge which is considered to be relevant to a specific society, and a means by which claims to social legitimacy may be made. The study of curricula and textbooks enables the reconstruction of patterns of perception and interpretation, or the standards and values which hold sway at any given time. Moreover, they offer insights into the variety of ways in which national identities are conceived of and constructed.

Curricula and textbooks provide reasonably reliable points of reference for educators. The complexity of the Holocaust and the sensitivity towards the social and political consequences of this event which continues to be felt in the present day mean that teachers are often uncertain about how they should teach the Holocaust. As a result, curricula and in particular textbooks are held by educators to provide secure sources of information and of methods to which teachers refer on the assumption that they provide accurate content and reliable didactic and methodological guidelines, which have been compiled by experienced historians, educational experts and authors.

== Sources ==
This article incorporates text from a free content work. Licensed under CC-BY-SA IGO 3.0 (license statement/permission). Text taken from The International status of education about the Holocaust: a global mapping of textbooks and curricula, 4, 12, 19–20, 34–37, 74, 158–167, Carrier, Peter; Fuchs, Eckhardt; Messinger, Torben, UNESCO. UNESCO.

This article incorporates text from a free content work. Licensed under CC BY-SA 3.0 IGO. Text taken from Addressing anti-semitism through education: guidelines for policymakers, UNESCO. UNESCO.
