= The Holocaust in textbooks =

The Holocaust is conceptualized and narrated in textbooks worldwide in a variety of approaches to treating temporal and spatial scales, protagonists, interpretative paradigms, narrative techniques, didactic methods and national idiosyncrasies with and within which the Holocaust. There exist convergent trends or internationally shared narrative templates, and divergent trends or narrative idiosyncrasies, which generally establish links between the Holocaust and local events. Textbooks in most countries focus most closely, via photographs and legal documentation, on the perpetrators’ point of view. This is a key component of education about the Holocaust.

== Scale ==
=== Spatial scale ===
Many textbooks ascribe multiple spaces (ranging from local, national to European and worldwide) to the Holocaust via authorial texts and especially in maps which show either the sites of concentration and extermination camps or, less commonly, military manœuvres during the Second World War. Transnational spaces are evoked in relation to the topics of collaboration (in France and Republic of Moldova, for example), emigration (in China, Argentina and the USA, for example) and in relation to mass atrocities or genocide in China and Rwanda, while textbooks from other countries, such as Brazil or El Salvador, do not allude to the significance of the Holocaust in their own countries. The event is generally named as one which occurred in Europe and Germany, while some textbooks domesticate the event, as in Belarus, Germany and Republic of Moldova, by providing details about the local repercussions of the Holocaust. Details of the occupying regime and administration of the General Government and of the role of satellite states are rare. Transcontinental connections are sometimes established which pit Europe against Asia where, for example, Indian authors refer to the threat of the ‘Europeanization’ of Asia, where authors of a Russian textbook qualify National Socialism as a ‘European’ phenomenon, or where another textbook from the Russian Federation refers to a ‘battle of European culture against Russian and bolshevist barbarity’.

=== Temporal scales ===
The temporal or historical context ascribed to the Holocaust is generally that of the Second World War; time spans given range from 1933 to 1945, with some mentions of key changes in 1938 or 1942 or the Warsaw ghetto uprising of 1943. References to deeper historical currents such as racial theories from the nineteenth century are mentioned in textbooks in Brazil, India, Germany and Namibia; Jewish history, emigration, or pre-twentieth century antisemitism are addressed in Argentinian, German, Japanese and American textbooks. Likewise, several textbook authors in Argentina, France, Germany, Namibia and the Russian Federation write about the aftereffects or memory of the Holocaust after 1945. Although human rights are frequently mentioned in connection with the Holocaust, textbook authors rarely explain or express in detail the universal legal or moral significance of the Holocaust. Some authors, of English textbooks for example, emphasize wider issues regarding how ‘ordinary people’ became ‘killers’, and while authors in Singapore focus on the universal history of racism, no textbooks in any countries can be said to present an ahistorical or universal narrative of the Holocaust.

== Protagonists ==
=== Perpetrators ===
Perpetrators are most frequently referred to as ‘Nazis’, ‘Germans’ and ‘fascists’. Individuals commonly named include Adolf Hitler, Heinrich Himmler, Reinhard Heydrich, Rudolf Höss and Adolf Eichmann. Most striking is the extent to which Hitlercentrism pervades textbook narratives of the Holocaust, with Hitler functioning as a moral repository for the event, as embodied in portraits of Hitler, excerpts from Mein Kampf and the attribution of sole responsibility to Hitler in such phrases, found in Russian textbooks, as ‘Hitlerian aggression’ or the ‘policy of Hitler-Germany’. By contrast, textbooks in France and Germany generally marginalize the role of Hitler in favour of an explanation of the event as a result of plural causes.

=== Victims ===
Victims are most frequently named as Jews and ‘Gypsies’ in textbooks from almost all countries, while other groups of victims, such as Slavs, people with disabilities, political opponents and homosexuals, are named less frequently. Other categories of victims are named, for example, as ‘black victims’ or ‘black people’ in South African, Rwandan and Indian textbooks. Generic references to an ‘inner enemy’ (in one Russian textbook) or to so-called ‘inferior’ or ‘undesirable’ ‘people’ (in Chinese, Russian and Uruguayan textbooks) detract from the specificity of Nazi ideology, while some references to Jewish victims as ‘opponents’ (in Côte d’Ivoire, for example) may mislead readers into believing that all Jews resisted or posed a threat to the National Socialist regime and that they were therefore a legitimate target of repression. Few textbooks depict Jewish life before 1933 or after 1945 (Germany is one example of a country whose textbooks do); most textbooks therefore largely present Jews as voiceless victims and as objects of perpetrators’ volition. Textbook authors in some countries regularly define victims in terms of national groups (as Poles, Ukrainians and Russians in Russian textbooks, for example) or nationalize Jewish identity in terms of ‘Polish’and ‘European’ (in Chinese textbooks), or ‘Ukrainian’ and ‘Hungarian’ Jews (in French textbooks). Numbers of victims are named in textbooks from approximately half the countries surveyed; most of these figures are accurate, although several textbooks draw attention not to the overall numbers of Jewish victims, but to the numbers of war victims generally (as in Russian textbooks), and to numbers of victims of specific nations or of specific camps. Images of the destroyed cities of Hiroshima and Dresden in French textbooks or of victims of apartheid in South Africa or of Chinese people during the Japanese invasion of 1937 extend the scope of victims to those of other atrocities.

=== Other protagonists ===
Other protagonists include members of the resistance, rescuers of the persecuted, the Allies, and local individuals who are named by their proper names, such as Janusz Korczak in Polish textbooks. Few bystanders or collaborators feature in the textbooks.

=== Individual complexity ===
The general distinction between active and passive protagonists, which is underscored by the use of the passive mode in several textbooks, highlights a dichotomy which fails to acknowledge the day-to-day responsibilities and decisions with which protagonists such as Kurt Gerstein or members of the Sonderkommando (presented in Polish and German textbooks respectively) were faced. Moreover, the focus on concentration and extermination camps as places of systematic persecution and murder detracts from details of lives of individuals at all stages of the Holocaust and from complex relationships between individuals, between individuals and groups, and between one group and another. Gender roles and relations during the Holocaust, as embodied in the different treatment of male and female prisoners or in the behaviour of female camp guards, are addressed in none of the textbooks in this sample; Anne Frank and/or homosexual victims are mentioned in the textbooks, albeit without reference to gender roles and relations.

== Interpretative paradigms ==
Textbook authors generally present the Holocaust in the context of a political history of the Second World War (of the rise of the National Socialist Party, of Hitler, of nationalism, expansionism and appeasement), but also emphasize state racial policy, Hitler’s personal beliefs, totalitarianism, and concentration and extermination camps, while in some cases drawing on historiographical models such as a ‘breach in civilization’ (in Chinese and Indian textbooks) and stages of ‘deportation’, ‘concentration’ and ‘extermination’ (in the Ivorian textbook) which correspond to the concepts found in Dan Diner’s and Raul Hilberg’s work on the Holocaust.

=== Conceptualizations of the Holocaust ===
The majority of textbooks in all countries name the event as the ‘Holocaust’, to which are added, in the course of the presentations, paraphrases of the event in terms of, for example, ‘discrimination against Jewish people, sent to concentration camps’ (in a Japanese textbook) or, characteristically, as ‘systematic killings’, ‘extermination’, ‘systematic genocide’, the ‘Final Solution’ and ‘massacres’ (in South African textbooks). The largely descriptive nature of history textbooks means that they generally adopt inclusive definitions of the event, that is, definitions which derive from the details of the event rather than from an exclusive a priori definition. Exceptions to this general rule are cases in which the Holocaust is not named or alluded to euphemistically, as in one Indian textbook, or in which it is paraphrased in partial terms, as in Egyptian and Syrian textbooks.

=== Aims, motives and responsibilities of protagonists ===
Most commonly, in almost all countries, the personalization of the event (its explanation as stemming from the personal convictions of one person) in relation to Hitler is a central interpretative paradigm. The textbook currently used in Namibian schools is characteristic of this technique. In this book, the Holocaust is dealt with in a section entitled ‘antisemitism’, on the first page of which the word ‘Hitler’ appears in a box in the middle of the page from which arrows point towards party organizations; the authors describe Hitler’s personal ‘determination to remove Jews from Germany’. English textbooks also refer to Hitler’s irrational hatred of the Jews and to his personal desire for revenge against Jews.

=== Causes ===
The most frequently named cause of the Holocaust is ideology (racism, antisemitism, totalitarianism, authoritarianism, militarism, capitalism, fascism). Textbooks in Brazil, Germany, Côte d’Ivoire, Japan, Republic of Moldova and Rwanda also qualify the expansionist policy of Nazi Germany as a form of colonialism.

=== Historiographical paradigms ===
Most textbook authors make use of one or more historiographical paradigms in order to explain the Holocaust. The two most common, and largely shared, paradigms are the identification of categories of protagonists in terms of perpetrators, victims, and bystanders, and the attribution of moral responsibility to one or more individuals in what has become known as ‘intentionalism’. Most textbooks in this survey conceive of protagonists as either perpetrators or victims, in addition to those who resisted the regime and, occasionally, bystanders and/or rescuers. No textbooks explore ambivalent roles beyond these categories. In some cases, as in French and Ivorian textbooks, Hilberg’s stages of the Holocaust, defined as identification, concentration and deportation, are reflected in textbook representations. Other paradigms include: the ‘breach of civilization’ ascribed to Dan Diner, which is echoed in textbooks in China and India; the behaviour of ‘ordinary Germans’ ascribed to Daniel Goldhagen in English textbooks; the effects of bureaucratization ascribed to Zygmunt Bauman, featured in textbooks in Argentina; the effects of peer pressure ascribed to Christopher Browning, discussed in textbooks in the USA; cumulative radicalization or functionalism ascribed to Hans Mommsen, raised in textbooks in England; and references to colonial aspects underpinning the Holocaust, made in textbooks from Brazil, Germany, Japan and Republic of Moldova. The large variety of historiographical authorities and works referred to in order to explain the event show that there is little consensus between textbook authors over explanatory models.

=== Metanarratives ===
A small number of textbooks, in Argentina, Poland, Spain and the USA, for example, complement their presentations of the history of the Holocaust with meta-historical commentaries in the form of glossaries of historic terms. Meta-narrative approaches are pedagogically effective when explaining the political expediency of commemorations of the Holocaust via monuments or in international relations, as in textbooks from Argentina, Germany, India and the Russian Federation. They also encourage a critical approach to such phenomena as the personality cult surrounding Hitler, as outlined in the Salvadorian textbook in our sample. In exceptional cases, authors not only apply historiographical paradigms, but also discuss their merits, as in the sketches of Hannah Arendt’s, Zygmunt Bauman’s and Daniel Goldhagen’s explanations of the Holocaust in Argentinian textbooks.

=== Comparisons ===
Comparisons between the Holocaust and other mass atrocities or genocides are often alluded to but not explained. Usage of the terms ‘terror’ and ‘cleansing’ in some Polish textbooks to describe historically different events detracts from their historical specificities. Similarly, the use of the term ‘terrorist’ to describe Hitler in one Brazilian textbook, ‘terror’ to describe the Holocaust in one German textbook, or even the definition of Zionist forces in Palestine as Jewish ‘terror groups’ in one Iraqi textbook lend themselves to semantic confusion if not anachronism. Similar semantic confusion arises when the term ‘extermination’ is used to describe the function of the Gulag in one Brazilian textbook or when a Belarusian textbook inaccurately claims that the National Socialist regime planned the ‘extermination of the Soviet people’, or when different regimes are described collectively as ‘totalitarian’ in Argentinian, Brazilian, French, Moldovan, Polish, Spanish, and briefly in English and Rwandan textbooks. The use of the term ‘fascism’ to describe the German and Japanese authorities during the Second World War and the use of the term ‘genocide’ (datusha) in Chinese textbooks to refer to crimes committed by both the Japanese forces in Nanjing and the National Socialists in the Holocaust detract from historical distinctions. Comparisons are also evoked by the use of images. The juxtaposition of images of different events, such as the images of Auschwitz and the Nanjing massacre in one French textbook, or of Dresden and Hiroshima in another French textbook, the association of suffering during the Holocaust with suffering caused by the atomic bomb in Hiroshima in one Ivorian textbook, or the association of Auschwitz and life under apartheid in one South African textbook, similarly obscure historical differences rather than explaining them comparatively. While such indiscriminate use of terms and imagery to describe different historical events is commonplace, and while textbooks in some countries allude to similarities by juxtaposing images or textual association, some textbooks in Poland and Argentina, for example, avoid relativizing the Holocaust by providing clear explanations of the comparable motives, methods and aims of the perpetrators of different mass crimes.

== Narrative techniques ==
=== Open versus closed narratives ===
Narrative techniques found in a small number of the textbooks are ‘closed’, which means that the authorial perspective involves a single narrative voice without quotations or complementary documents (as in Albanian textbooks). At the other extreme, some authors apply, at least in part, an open technique by juxtaposing images of different historical events (of a man holding his passport during apartheid beside an image of prisoners arriving in Auschwitz in one South African textbook, for example) in order to allude to meanings without explaining them. The majority of textbooks apply a technique midway between these extremes, juxtaposing authorial texts with additional perspectives reflected in quotations and textual and visual documentation.

=== Points of view ===
The predominance of textual and visual documentation produced by perpetrators, which generally assures considerable understanding of perpetrators’ lives and motives, is frequently found in combination with emotive language expressing condemnation of their acts, often in pathological terms, such as the descriptions of them as ‘crazy’ and ‘unbelievable’ in Chinese textbooks. In some cases authors inadvertently perpetuate the perpetrators’ viewpoint. One Ivorian textbook, for example, presents victims primarily as ‘opponents, especially the Jews and the Gypsies’, then as ‘millions of men, women and children’, then as ‘Jews’, and thereby reinforces the idea that ‘the’ Jews and ‘the’ Gypsies (that is, all of them) were killed as a result of their role as ‘opponents’, as if the killers, at least according to their own reasoning, therefore had a just reason to kill them. This conflation of members of the resistance, Jews and Gypsies effectively reproduces the perpetrators’ view that the Third Reich needed to defend itself against an alleged threat.

=== Types of moral narrative employed (decline, fatalism or progression) ===
Most striking are the different ways in which authors lend moral value to the Holocaust. Most authors couch the history of the Holocaust in terms of decline followed by progress. However, the object of this progression varies from one country to another. Polish textbooks notably combine stories of national resistance to the German occupation of Poland with references to the Polish underground government, Polish helpers and Jewish resistance as exemplified by the Warsaw ghetto uprising. Russian textbooks, by contrast, as do those from the USA, focus on progression towards military victory in the Second World War and thus present allied military victory in the place of victory over the Holocaust, in particular over the camp system. The French textbook designed for the final year of secondary schooling even presents the history of commemoration of the Holocaust in progressive terms as one which shifted from national homage to national moral integrity via the acknowledgement of crimes. The most commonly found narrative of progression is one which ends with an allusion to the Universal Declaration of Human Rights and the Convention on the Prevention and Punishment of the Crime of Genocide adopted by the United Nations in 1948.

=== Implied readers ===
The complexity of the presentation of, the values named in relation to, and the type of (local, national or international) framework in which authors place the Holocaust, reflects the prior knowledge of the textbooks’ expected readers. North American textbooks, for example, emphasize liberal values and tolerance of difference; Chinese and Albanian textbooks praise local people who helped Jewish refugees; German textbooks extol democracy and the rule of law as opposed to dictatorship, and also assume that the Holocaust is a German event, the product of National Socialism in the absence of non-German collaborators.

== Didactic approaches ==
=== Types of exercises ===
These vary widely from, at one extreme, the lack of any exercises urging pupils to question and explore materials presented in the textbooks, to a wide variety of exercises including storytelling, document interpretation, role play, textual or pictorial analysis, and exercises requiring pupils to either find rational explanations of the events or else to empathize with protagonists via letter writing, biographical writing and analysis of protagonists’ decisions. In some cases, exercises simply involve collating information provided in the textbooks (Rwanda) or comparing statistics (Republic of Moldova).

=== Specific learning objectives associated with the Holocaust ===
The textbooks testify to a trend towards stating and affirming values such as human rights (in India, Iraq, Namibia, Republic of Moldova and Rwanda, for example) or affirming the role of the United Nations in securing human rights after 1945 (in Brazil, El Salvador, Spain or Uruguay, for example), albeit without explaining the origins, meaning, history, implementation and effectiveness of the principles of human rights. Textbook authors adopt similar approaches by affirming democratic values (as in France, Republic of Moldova, the Russian Federation, South Africa and Uruguay) as a radical alternative to values associated with dictatorship or autocracy (El Salvador), while references to citizenship, moral norms, or genocide prevention are rare. No textbooks in our sample address human rights historically.

=== Didactic links to localities ===
Many textbooks link the Holocaust to local horizons by appealing to pupils to, for example, conduct interviews with Jewish survivors in Shanghai (in a Chinese textbook), explore the rescuing of persecuted people in Albania and compare the motivations of perpetrators in Romania and Germany (Republic of Moldova), or explore local historical and commemorative sites (Germany).

=== National idiosyncrasies ===
All of the textbooks, to varying extents, decontextualize and recontextualize the Holocaust in terms which are alien to the event itself or partial, in a process of (national) appropriation and ‘domestication’. Authors appeal to local readerships, in particular in countries whose populations have no direct experience or inherited memory of the event. These expedient idiosyncrasies are linked largely to the interests of authors writing in the present day within curricular guidelines for identifiable readerships, meaning that textbook representations of the Holocaust may subsume historical information to values or legal and political interests which are largely the product of the situation within and out of which the textbooks are written.

=== The Holocaust as a measure of local mass atrocities ===
Some Chinese, Rwandan and South African textbooks radically deviate from western historical perspectives by evoking the Holocaust in sections of textbooks devoted to other examples of persecution or genocide. Chinese textbooks, for example, treat the Holocaust briefly as an example by which to illustrate and measure the extent of the local massacre of 1937 in Nanjing. Experts agree that discussion of the Holocaust among peoples whose countries have only recently experienced mass atrocities, or in which little discussion of the event has hitherto taken place, is an effective way of broaching local persecution indirectly while avoiding the conflict which a direct discussion of the issues might provoke.

=== Nationalizing victimhood in post-communist Europe ===
Belarusian and Russian textbooks generally adhere to the notion that the Second World War involved a violation of national territories. The authors of Belarusian textbooks, for example, refer to 'the occupied territory' and to the fact that 'the territory of Belarus was covered with a network of concentration camps'. Russian textbooks likewise largely displace the Holocaust behind a history of the suppression of Slavs and of Soviet heroism. Textbooks in Albania also appear to uphold the Holocaust as a measure of local heroism by defining the Holocaust as the 'age of upheaval 1914-1945' while drawing attention to heroic acts of Albanian citizens who rescued Jews, and to the humanitarian values of hospitality, religious tolerance, humanism and antifascism. Although Polish textbooks firmly focus on the Polish dimension of the Holocaust by presenting it as an event in Polish history with Polish figureheads and as a consequence of the occupation of Poland, the books in this sample no longer nationalize victimhood, but render multiple perspectives with meta-historical critiques. However, representations from countries of the former Soviet Union and former members of the Warsaw Pact do not conform to a uniform pattern. Research has shown that Baltic States traditionally depict a 'symmetry between Nazi and communist crimes'. And in Ukraine, the famine known as the Holodomor continues to compete with and even displace representations of the Holocaust, which harbours more ambiguous recollections of both persecution and collaboration among Ukrainian citizens.

=== Exculpatory appropriation ===
By defining crimes committed during the Holocaust as ‘genocide’ while defining local crimes euphemistically (as ‘cruel acts’, for example), some Japanese textbooks play down the moral and legal repercussions of crimes committed locally. Thus ‘exculpatory interpretations’ of the Holocaust may be used as a ‘measure’ or ‘benchmark’ of the putatively relatively minor significance of local persecution, by which attention is detracted from those responsible for comparable crimes.

=== Borrowed history in a former colony ===
By focusing on French collaboration and resistance rather than deportation, the authors of Ivorian textbooks adopt the viewpoint of, and thereby affirm a degree of loyalty to, the former colonial power. The Ivorian textbook, for example, adopts a ‘French’ reading of the Second World War by emphasizing collaboration and resistance, and by subsuming Jewish victims to the legend of a nation united in resistance which pervaded public perceptions of the role of France during the Second World War until the 1980s.

=== Political expediency of the Holocaust ===
In extreme cases, textbooks evoke the Holocaust marginally in a history which focuses entirely on the Second World War. One Indian textbook produced during the mandate of the government coalition led by the Left Front, for example, marginalizes the Holocaust in favour of the history of resistance to the Nazi war effort as an analogy to the struggle for Indian independence. Likewise, the total disregard for the Holocaust in another textbook may be ascribed to the fact that its authors appear to sympathize with the nationalist Bharatiya Janata Party (BJP) and with its radical nationalism and the goal of territorial unity akin to that of the National Socialists. By contrast, liberal authors present Gandhi’s attempts to negotiate with Hitler in the hope that the regime may abstain from its racial policy.

=== Generalization and abstraction ===
While no textbooks in the sample overtly question the history of the Holocaust, some present it in partial or abstract terms, such that the reader learns little about the event. A Syrian textbook, for example, refers to the event as ‘conditions of oppression by the Nazis in Europe’; an Iraqi textbook similarly describes the violation of human rights and crimes against humanity committed under the National Socialist regime, but conceptualizes the event in purely legal terms as one which ended once perpetrators had been tried, punished or exculpated by the Nuremberg Tribunal. Jewish victims of Nazi oppression are named in these textbooks in association with the alleged lack of resolve of the British Mandate to stem Jewish immigration to Palestine.

=== Selective reductionism ===
South African and Rwandan textbooks are examples of selective narratives which partly reduce the Holocaust to a form of racism, illustrated with images of Hitler and Darwin side by side, or evoke analogies between life under apartheid and persecution carried out by the National Socialists.

Similarly, in Qatari textbooks, the Holocaust is omitted entirely in sections on Nazi Germany and World War II. These textbooks instead summarize Hitler's aims as "to establish a national army, unite the Germans, and reclaim German colonies" and encourage students to read his book Mein Kampf; there is only a vague mention of his "racist ideas". International schools are required to teach using these state-approved textbooks. One teacher interviewed said, "We are not allowed to mention Jews. The genocide didn't happen to them. It is like brainwashing," adding that "some Arabic students would even 'glorify' Hitler and write praise for him in their textbooks."

== Connection to curricula ==
The Holocaust in curricula discusses the ways in which the Holocaust is presented in secondary school level history and social studies curricula worldwide. Curricula and textbooks, in particular those designed for history teaching, provide both a space for the formation of a condensed canon of knowledge which is considered to be relevant to a specific society, and a means by which claims to social legitimacy may be made. The study of curricula and textbooks enables the reconstruction of patterns of perception and interpretation, or the standards and values which hold sway at any given time. Moreover, they offer insights into the variety of ways in which national identities are conceived of and constructed.

Curricula and textbooks provide reasonably reliable points of reference for educators. The complexity of the Holocaust and the sensitivity towards the social and political consequences of this event which continues to be felt in the present day mean that teachers are often uncertain about how they should teach the Holocaust. As a result, curricula and in particular textbooks are held by educators to provide secure sources of information and of methods to which teachers refer on the assumption that they provide accurate content and reliable didactic and methodological guidelines, which have been compiled by experienced historians, educational experts and authors.

== Sources ==
This article incorporates text from a free content work. Licensed under CC-BY-SA IGO 3.0 (license statement/permission). Text taken from The International status of education about the Holocaust: a global mapping of textbooks and curricula, 4, 12, 19-20, 34-37, 74, 158-167, Carrier, Peter; Fuchs, Eckhardt; Messinger, Torben, UNESCO. UNESCO.
