= Academic discourse socialization =

Academic discourse socialization is defined as one's growing process to realize the academic discourse and reach the expectation of the academic community. Academic discourse socialization is a form of language socialization through which newcomers or novices gain knowledge of the academic discourses by socializing and interacting with peers, experts, or more knowledgeable people in their community and social network. A dynamic and complex process, academic discourse socialization requires negotiation of both knowledge and one's identity. This kind of interaction is defined as a bidirectional process in which both novice learners and experts learn from one another.

== Early work and major contributions ==
Over the last two decades, the field of applied linguistics has given renewed attention to academic discourse socialization, especially the disciplinary socialization of second language students. A growing body of research has explored socialization experiences of both first and second language learners through oral discourses, such as academic presentations, small group discussions and student-teacher individual conferences for feedback on writing. To understand the complex processes that academic discourse socialization entails, some studies have also explored students' out of class interactions. For instance, Seloni's micro ethnography investigated the role of both in-class and out-of-class collaboration of first-year doctoral students in facilitating their socialization into their respective academic communities. She also noted that in these social spaces (classroom and informal interactions) doctoral students accepted and resisted literacy practices and thus created "hybrid forms of literacy practices". While some studies revealed that out of class collaborations are effective and have a positive effect on socialization experiences, others demonstrated that these collaborations are not always favorable.

Recently, written interactions in the form of feedback have also gained some attention in the field and increased our understanding on the impact of feedback (as a social practice) on second language students' socialization into their academic discourses and communities.

Technology-mediated academic discourse socialization have also become more common with the increasing use of digital tools, such as discussion forums, google docs, blogs and applications of Wikipedia-based assignments in higher education.

== Function and process ==
Collaboration is central to academic discourse socialization. Shifting from individual to collaborative work and building a social network expands understanding of the textbook and discourses. Not only interactions that take place in formal settings (classrooms) but also collaborating with others, especially peers beyond the classroom, help learners socialize into their desired academic communities. Academic Discourse Socialization is an investment in which learners get academic and emotional support as a return and peers play an important role in providing this support. Peers are also called literacy brokers and could be someone who is going through the same process, they don't necessarily have to be experts. Peer support, both inside (formal contexts) and outside (informal contexts) of the classroom, help learners gain knowledge of academic discourses and enhances students' understanding of their trajectories, identities and capabilities.

Academic presentations also provide a good context to socialize into oral discourses and culture of discourse communities. Socialization through small group discussions allows learners to draw ideas from their prior and existing knowledge and understand a new concept. Given the affordances of digital tools, asynchronous discussions are also considered a productive for academic discourse socialization and literacy development, provided these discussions are graded, carefully designed, and pay attention to learners' agency.

== Academic discourse ==
"Academic discourse refers to the ways of thinking and using language which exist in the academy." Discourse is not just "language" itself; discourse is language use that represents a person's existence in the world. Thus, what one has said and written are significant to academic community, which also shows that the institution cannot exist without academic discourse. Academic discourse does not only function as a tool to convey one's thoughts but also influences one's formation of social identity, values, and world knowledge. The common ways to present academic discourse are through textbooks, conference presentations, dissertations, lectures, and research articles.

Students in the institution learn to display their thoughts through different types of academic discourse, such as classroom and conference presentations, assignments, and dissertations. In this way, they acquire social practice in the different academic fields, get to the heart of the academic enterprise, and finally become a member of a social group.

Discourse conventions in a particular academic field are shaped by the ways of thinking of community members and the values they believe in. Written works and speeches are widely accepted if they are composed and delivered in a suitable way in terms of discourse conventions. The recognition of a publication from an academic community is regarded as the accomplishment of one's academic life and the realization of academic discourse. It is highly motivating when one's published paper was cited or further developed by community members because it is evidence of acceptance. In order to get a reputation of the academic community, people make some contributions through publication to receive compliments.

== Popularity of academic discourse ==
From the mid-1960s, the issues of academic discourse have caught researchers’ and scholars’ eyes and grown massively. The first reason why academic discourse has become popular is because the number of students in higher education has dramatically increased, resulting in greater diversity of students.

“This more culturally, socially and linguistically heterogeneous student population means that learners bring different identities, understandings and habits of meaning-making to a more diverse range of subjects.” Therefore, it leads to the problem that it is more difficult for teachers to know whether students acquire the required ability of the principle or not. With the popularity of the concept of academic discourse, teachers can clearly define students’ learning achievement through their performance on different types of academic discourse.

The second reason concerns the transformation of education system. Nowadays, schools do not solely rely on government funding; instead, students’ fees are thought of as a major source of income. Universities are more competitive because students as customers choose prestigious schools which are highly evaluated on the aspect of academic discourse, including the publication of dissertations and lectures in conferences.

The last reason, and also the most important factor affecting the development of academic discourse is the spread of English. English becomes a lingua franca for oral and written communication. Even academic journals, as a representative type of academic discourse, are most in English. Moreover, “the global status of English has come to influence both the lives of scholars throughout the globe and the production and exchange of academic knowledge in the twenty-first century.” As a result, the learning of academic discourse is especially meaningful for second language learners.

Novice learners first enter into legitimate peripheral participation and then move to the center of the academic community. That is, beginners first acquire the conventions of academic discourse peripherally and imitate discourse activities from experienced learners or experts. After a period of time, learners can also complete academic oral presentations and academic essays, and in the end, the publication of dissertations and participation in international conferences just as what former experts do in the academic community.

Students in the institution learn to display their thoughts through different types of academic discourse, such as classroom and conference presentations, assignments, and dissertations. In this way, they acquire social practice in the different academic fields, get to the heart of the academic enterprise, and finally become a member of a social group, which can be seen as a process of academic discourse socialization.

== Bibliography ==
- Flowerdew, J. (2002). Introduction: Approaches to the analysis of academic discourse in English. In Flowerdew, J. (Ed.), Academic discourse. (pp. 21–39). Edinburgh Gate, H: Longman.
- Morita, N. (2000). Discourse socialization through oral classroom activities in a TESL graduate program. TESOL Quarterly, 34, 279-310.
- Morita, N. (2009). Language, culture, gender, and academic socialization. Language and education, 23, 443-460.
- Zamel, V. (1998). Questioning academic discourse. In Zamel, V. & Spack, R. (Eds.), Negotiating academic literacies: Teaching and learning across languages and cultures (pp. 187–197). Mahwah, NJ: Lawrence Erlbaum Associates.
