= Atheism in the United States =

American atheists
Total population
- ▲56,000,000 (17%) (answered "No" to the question "Do you believe in God?") (2017); 9,571,112 (3.1%) (self-described atheists) (2014)

Religions
- Irreligion: (including antitheism, agnostic atheism, apatheism, casualism, counter-apologeticism, debaptism evangelical atheism, freethought/freethinker, ignosticism, implicit and explicit atheism, Marxist–Leninist atheism, negative and positive atheism, nonbeliever, nontheism, post-theism, rationalism, new/scientific atheism, physicoaseitism (naturoaseitism), physicalism, metaphysical naturalism, logicalism, secular humanism, skepticism, etc.); Secular religions: Buddhism; (including secular Buddhism, etc.); Christian atheism; (including Cultural Christian (Cultural Catholic, Cultural Mormon, Nontheist Quakers, etc.), Lapsed Catholic, Recovering Catholic etc.); Ethical movement; Hinduism; (including Adevism, Charvaka, Hindu atheist, etc.); Jainism; Jewish atheism; (including Cultural Judaism, etc.); Secular Paganism; Muslim atheism; (including Cultural Muslim, etc.); New religious movements; (including Creativity, Raëlism, etc.); Parody religions; (including Church of the Flying Spaghetti Monster/Pastafarianism, Invisible Pink Unicorn, Jediism, etc.); Nontheistic Satanism; Naturalistic pantheism; Unitarian Universalism

A 2023 poll by the Pew Research Center found that 4% of Americans in the United States self-identified as atheists. This is an increase from 3.1% of Americans in 2014. However, in 2014, 9% of Americans agreed with the statement "Do not believe in God" while 2% agreed with the statement "Do not know if they believe in God". According to a poll by non-profit Public Religion Research Institute (PRRI) in 2023, 4% of Americans were atheist and 5% were agnostic. Polling by Gallup in 2022 showed that 17% of respondents replied "No" when asked "Do you believe in God?" in a binary fashion, but when worded differently in 2023, Gallup found that 12% of respondents replied they "Do not believe in" God and 14% replied they were "Not sure about" the existence of God. According to Gallup, there are variations in their polling results because they ask about God in three different wordings, each with a different result.

According to the 2014 General Sociological Survey, the number of atheists and agnostics in the U.S. grew over the previous 23 years. In 1991, only 2% identified as atheist, and 4% identified as agnostic; while in 2014, 3.1% identified as atheists, and 5% identified as agnostics.

According to the 2008 ARIS, only 2% the US population was atheist, while 10% were agnostics.

One 2018 research paper using indirect methods estimated that 26% of Americans are atheists, which is much higher than the 3%–11% rates that are consistently found in surveys. However, methodological problems have been identified with this particular study; in particular, it has been posted that many people might not have a binary outlook to the question of the existence of God.

Accurate demographics of atheism are difficult to obtain since conceptions of atheism and self-identification are context dependent by culture. In 2009, Pew stated that only 5% of the US population did not have a belief in a god and out of that small group only 24% self-identified as "atheist", while 15% self-identified as "agnostic" and 35% self-identified as "nothing in particular". In 2023, Pew stated that 23% of atheists believe in a higher power, but not a god. In 2024, Pew stated that 31% of atheists believe in a spirit or soul.

The 2024 Meaning Making Survey focused on "religiously unaffiliated" respondents and noted that only 19% of this group held atheistic beliefs. In terms of supernatural beliefs, belief in ghosts was held by 36% of agnostics and 26% of atheists, belief in reincarnation was held by 24% of agnostics and 20% of atheists, belief in an afterlife was held by 25% of agnostics and 15% of atheists.

== Demographics (2014) ==
=== Age ===
Lack of belief in god/gods among age groups in the United States (2014)
Age group	% of lack of belief in god/gods	% of self described atheists	Source
18–29 year olds	16	6	
30–49 year olds	9	3	
All Americans	9	3.1	
50–64 year olds	6	2	
65+ year olds	6	2	

=== Education ===
Lack of belief in god/gods among education in the United States (2014)
Highest degree earned	% of lack of belief in god/gods	% of self described atheists	Source
Post-graduate degree	14	5	
College graduate	14	5	
All Americans	9	3.1	
Some college	9	3	
High school or less	6	2	

=== Gender ===
Lack of belief in god/gods among genders in the United States (2014)
Gender	% of lack of belief in god/gods	% of self described atheists	Source
Male American	12	4	
Americans	9	3.1	
Female American	6	2	

=== Generation ===
Lack of belief in god/gods among generations in the United States (2014)
Generation	% of lack of belief in god/gods	% of self described atheists	Source
Younger Millennial Americans	17	6	
Older Millennial Americans	13	4	
Americans	9	3.1	
Generation X Americans	9	3	
Greatest Americans	7	2	
Baby Boomer Americans	6	2	
Silent Americans	6	1	

=== Household income ===
Lack of belief in god/gods among household income in the United States (2014)
Cohort	% of lack of belief in god/gods	% of self described atheists	Source
$100,000 or more, Americans	14	5	
$50,000–$99,999, Americans	11	3	
$30,000–$49,999, Americans	9	3	
Americans	9	3.1	
Less than $30,000, Americans	7	2	

=== Immigrant status ===
Lack of belief in god/gods among immigrant status in the United States (2014)
Generation	% of lack of belief in god/gods	% of self described atheists	Source
Second generation Americans	14	4	
Americans	9	3.1	
Third generation or higher Americans	9	3	
Immigrants	8	3	

=== Marital status ===
Lack of belief in god/gods among marital status in the United States (2014)
Cohort	% of lack of belief in god/gods	% of self described atheists	Source
Never married Americans	15	5	
Living with a partner Americans	14	5	
Americans	9	3.1	
Married Americans	7	2	
Divorced/separated Americans	6	2	
Widowed Americans	3	1	

=== Metro area ===
Lack of belief in god/gods/self described atheists among metro areas in the United States (2014)
State/federal district	% of lack of belief in god/gods	% of self described atheists	Source
Greater San Francisco Bay Area	21	5	
Seattle metropolitan area	20	10	
Boston metropolitan area	17	4	
Providence metropolitan area	15	4	
Baltimore metropolitan area	14	3	
Philadelphia metropolitan area	13	5	
Tampa metropolitan area	13	4	
San Diego metropolitan area	12	3	
Washington metropolitan area	12	4	
Greater Los Angeles Area	11	4	
New York metropolitan area	11	4	
Phoenix metropolitan area	11	3	
Chicago metropolitan area	10	3	
Americans	9	3.1	
Detroit metropolitan area	9	3	
Miami metropolitan area	9	3	
Riverside metropolitan area	8	1	
Dallas–Fort Worth metroplex	7	1	
Atlanta metropolitan area	6	3	
Houston metropolitan area	6	2	
St. Louis metropolitan area	6	3	
Pittsburgh metropolitan area	5	3	

=== Political affiliation ===
Lack of belief in god/gods among political affiliation in the United States (2014)
Political affiliation	% of lack of belief in god/gods	% of self described atheists	Source
Democrat/Lean Democrat Americans	13	5	
Americans	9	3.1	
No lean, Americans	9	3	
Republican/Lean Republican Americans	5	1	

=== Parental status ===
Lack of belief in god/gods among parental status in the United States (2014)
Parental status	% of lack of belief in god/gods	% of self described atheists	Source
Non-parents of children under 18 year old Americans	10	3	
Americans	9	3.1	
Parents of children under 18 year old Americans	7	2	

=== Political ideology ===
Lack of belief in god/gods among political ideology in the United States (2014)
Political ideology	% of lack of belief in god/gods	% of self described atheists	Source
Liberal Americans	19	7	
Americans	9	3.1	
Moderate Americans	9	3	
Don't know, Americans	8		
Conservative Americans	3	1	

=== Race ===
Lack of belief in god/gods among racial groups in the United States (2014)
Racial group	% of lack of belief in god/gods	% of self described atheists	Source
Asian Americans	19	6	
White Americans	11	4	
Americans	9	3.1	
Other/Mixed Americans	8	2	
Latino Americans	6	2	
African Americans	2	1	

=== Region ===
Lack of belief in god/gods/self described atheists among regions in the United States (2014)
State/federal district	% of lack of belief in god/gods	% of self described atheists	Source
Northeastern United States	12	4	
Western United States	12	4	
Americans	9	3.1	
Midwestern United States	8	3	
Southern United States	7	2	

=== Religion ===
Lack of belief in god/gods among religious/belief groups in the United States (2014)
Religious group	% of lack of belief in god/gods	Source
Atheist Americans	92	
Agnostic Americans	41	
Nothing in particular (religion not important), Americans	33	
Unaffiliated Americans	33	
Buddhist Americans	27	
New Age movement, Americans	21	
Nothing in particular, Americans	20	
Unitarians and other liberal faiths in "other faiths", Americans	19	
Jewish Americans	17	
Hindu Americans	10	
Americans	9	
Episcopalian (Mainline Protestant) Americans	4	
Anglican Church, Americans	3	
Episcopal Church, Americans	3	
Nothing in particular (religion important), Americans	3	
Eastern Orthodox Americans	3	
Lutheran (Mainline Protestant) Americans	2	
Mainline Protestant Americans	2	
Nondenominational (Mainline Protestant) Americans	2	
Roman Catholic Americans	2	
Baptist (Mainline Protestant) Americans	1	
Christian Americans	1	
Evangelical Lutheran Church in America, Americans	1	
Muslim Americans	1	
Pentecostal (Evangelical Protestant) Americans	1	
Presbyterian (Evangelical Protestant) Americans	1	
Presbyterian (Mainline Protestant) Americans	1	
Presbyterian Church in America, Americans	1	
Presbyterian Church, Americans	1	
United Church of Christ, Americans	1	
United Methodist Church, Americans	1	
Adventist (Evangelical Protestant) Americans	<1	
African Methodist Episcopal Church, Americans	<1	
American Baptist Churches, Americans	<1	
Assemblies of God, Americans	<1	
Baptist (Evangelical Protestant) Americans	<1	
Baptist (Historically Black Protestant) Americans	<1	
Church of God, Americans	<1	
Church of God in Christ, Americans	<1	
Church of Jesus Christ of Latter-day Saints, Americans	<1	
Church of the Nazarene, Americans	<1	
Churches of Christ, Americans	<1	
Evangelical Protestant Americans	<1	
Historically Black Protestant, Americans	<1	
Holiness (Evangelical Protestant), Americans	<1	
Independent Baptist (Evangelical Protestant) Americans	<1	
Interdenominational (Evangelical Protestant) Americans	<1	
Interdenominational (Mainline Protestant) Americans	<1	
Jehovah's Witness, Americans	<1	
Lutheran (Evangelical Protestant) Americans	<1	
Lutheran Church–Missouri Synod, Americans	<1	
Methodist (Historically Black Protestant) Americans	<1	
Mormon Americans	<1	
National Baptist Convention, Americans	<1	
Nondenominational (Evangelical Protestant) Americans	<1	
Nondenominational (Historically Black Protestant) Americans	<1	
Nondenominational charismatic Americans	<1	
Nondenominational evangelical Americans	<1	
Nondenominational fundamentalist Americans	<1	
Pentecostal (Historically Black Protestant) Americans	<1	
Restorationist (Evangelical Protestant) Americans	<1	
Seventh-day Adventist Americans	<1	
Southern Baptist Convention, Americans	<1	

=== Sexual orientation ===
Self described atheists among sexual orientations in the United States (2014)
Sexual orientation	% of self described atheists	Source
LGBT Americans	8	
Americans	3.1	
Straight Americans	3	

=== State/federal district ===
Disbelief in god/gods in the United States by state/territory in 2014 >20% 15–19 10–14 7–9% 4–6% <4%

Lack of belief in god/gods/self described atheists among states/local district in the United States (2014)
State/federal district	% of lack of belief in god/gods		% of self described atheists		Source
	# of population		# of population		
Vermont	131,406	21	43,802	7	
Massachusetts	1,178,573	18	327,381	5	
Maine	212,538	16	26,567	2	
New Hampshire	210,635	16	78,988	6	
District of Columbia	84,241	14	24,069	4	
Oregon	498,040	13	191,554	5	
Washington	874,190	13	336,227	5	
Alaska	85,228	12	35,512	5	
California	4,470,475	12	1,490,158	4	
Connecticut	427,834	12	178,264	5	
Nevada	324,066	12	135,028	5	
Wisconsin	682,438	12	170,610	3	
New York	2,131,591	11	968,905	5	
Idaho	172,434	11	31,352	2	
New Mexico	226,510	11	61,775	3	
Rhode Island	115,782	11	42,103	4	
Arizona	639,202	10	191,761	3	
Colorado	502,920	10	201,168	4	
Florida	1,880,131	10	564,039	3	
Indiana	648,380	10	194,514	3	
Maryland	577,355	10	173,207	3	
Pennsylvania	1,270,238	10	381,071	3	
Hawaii	122,427	9	27,206	2	
Illinois	1,154,757	9	384,919	3	
Iowa	274,172	9	121,854	4	
Michigan	889,528	9	296,509	3	
Minnesota	477,353	9	159,118	3	
Nebraska	164,371	9	18,263	1	
United States	27,787,098	9	9,571,112	3.1	
Montana	79,153	8	39,577	4	
New Jersey	703,352	8	175,838	2	
North Dakota	53,807	8	13,452	2	
Utah	221,111	8	82,917	3	
Virginia	640,082	8	160,020	2	
Kentucky	303,756	7	173,574	4	
Delaware	62,855	7	17,959	2	
Kansas	199,718	7	57,062	2	
North Carolina	667,484	7	190,710	2	
Ohio	807,555	7	230,730	2	
South Dakota	56,993	7	24,425	3	
Georgia	581,259	6	193,753	2	
Louisiana	272,002	6	90,667	2	
Missouri	359,336	6	119,779	2	
Texas	1,508,734	6	502,911	2	
Wyoming	33,818	6	16,909	3	
South Carolina	231,268	5	46,254	1	
West Virginia	92,650	5	18,530	1	
Arkansas	116,637	4	58,318	2	
Mississippi	118,692	4	29,673	1	
Tennessee	190,383	3	63,461	1	
Alabama	95,595	2	47,797	1	

== Public officials ==
=== United States representatives ===
Photo	Name	State	Position	Party	Term	Source
Pete Stark	Pete Stark	California	United States Representative from California's 8th district, 9th district, 13th district	Democratic	1973–2013	
Jared Huffman	Jared Huffman	California	United States Representative from California's 2nd district	Democratic	2013–present	

=== United States senators ===
Photo	Name	State	Position	Party	Term	Source
Thomas Gore	Thomas Gore	Oklahoma	United States Senator from Oklahoma	Democratic	1907–1921 1931, 1937	

=== Governors ===
Photo	Name	State	Position	Party		Term	Source
Culbert Olson	Culbert Olson	California	29th governor of California	Democratic		1939–1943	
Jesse Ventura	Jesse Ventura	Minnesota	38th governor of Minnesota	Reform (1998–2000)	Independence (2000–2003)	1999–2003	

=== State legislators ===
Photo	Name	State	Position	Party	Term	Source
Timothy Smith	Timothy Smith	New Hampshire	New Hampshire State Representative	Democratic	2012–2022	
Culbert Olson	Culbert Olson	California	California State Senator	Democratic	1934–1938	
Jared Huffman	Jared Huffman	California	California State Assembly, 2nd district	Democratic	2006–2012	
Sean Faircloth	Sean Faircloth	Maine	Maine Representative, 17th and 117th districts Maine State Senator	Democratic	1992–1994; 2002–2008; 1994–1996	
	Ernie Chambers	Nebraska	Nebraska State Senator, 11th district	Independent	1971–2009; 2013–2021	
Megan Hunt	Megan Hunt	Nebraska	Nebraska State Senator, 8th district	Democratic	2019–present	
Lori Lipman Brown	Lori Lipman Brown	Nevada	Nevada State Senator	Democratic	1992–1994	
	Andrew Zwicker	New Jersey	New Jersey General Assembly, 16th District	Democratic	2016–present	
Culbert Olson	Culbert Olson	Utah	Utah State Senator	Democratic	1916–1920	

=== Mayors ===
Photo	Name	State	Position	Party	Term	Source
Jesse Ventura	Jesse Ventura	Minnesota	Mayor of Brooklyn Park, Minnesota	Independent	1991–1995	
Rocky Anderson	Rocky Anderson	Utah	33rd Mayor of Salt Lake City, Utah	Democratic	2000–2008	

=== City councils ===
Photo	Name	State	Position	Party	Term	Source
Sean Faircloth	Sean Faircloth	Maine	Chair of the City Council of Bangor	Democratic	2016–present	
Cecil Bothwell	Cecil Bothwell	North Carolina	City councilor of Asheville	Democratic	2009–2017	

== Political views ==
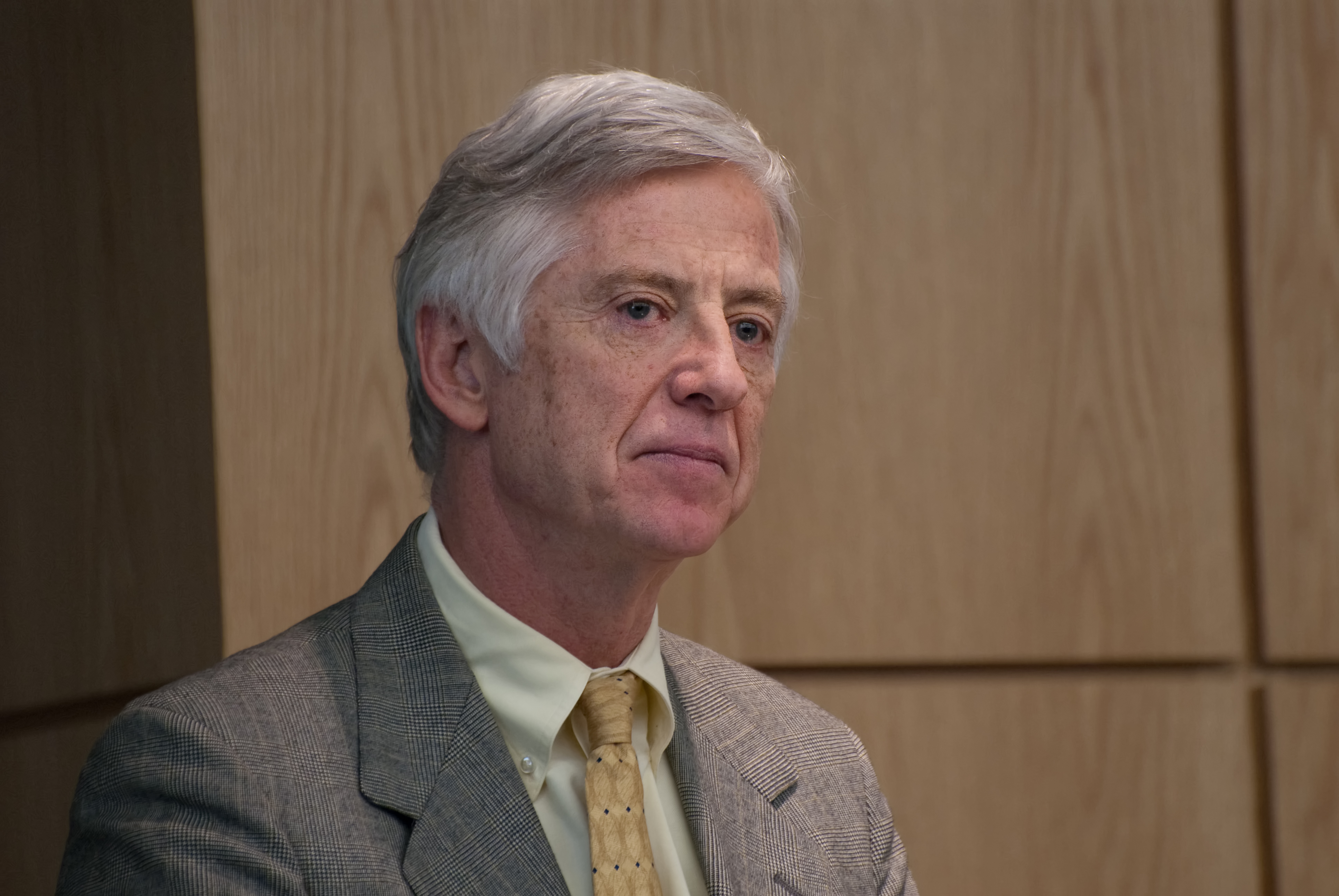
Rocky Anderson, founder of the Justice Party

Douglas Campbell, co-founder of the Godless Americans Political Action Committee

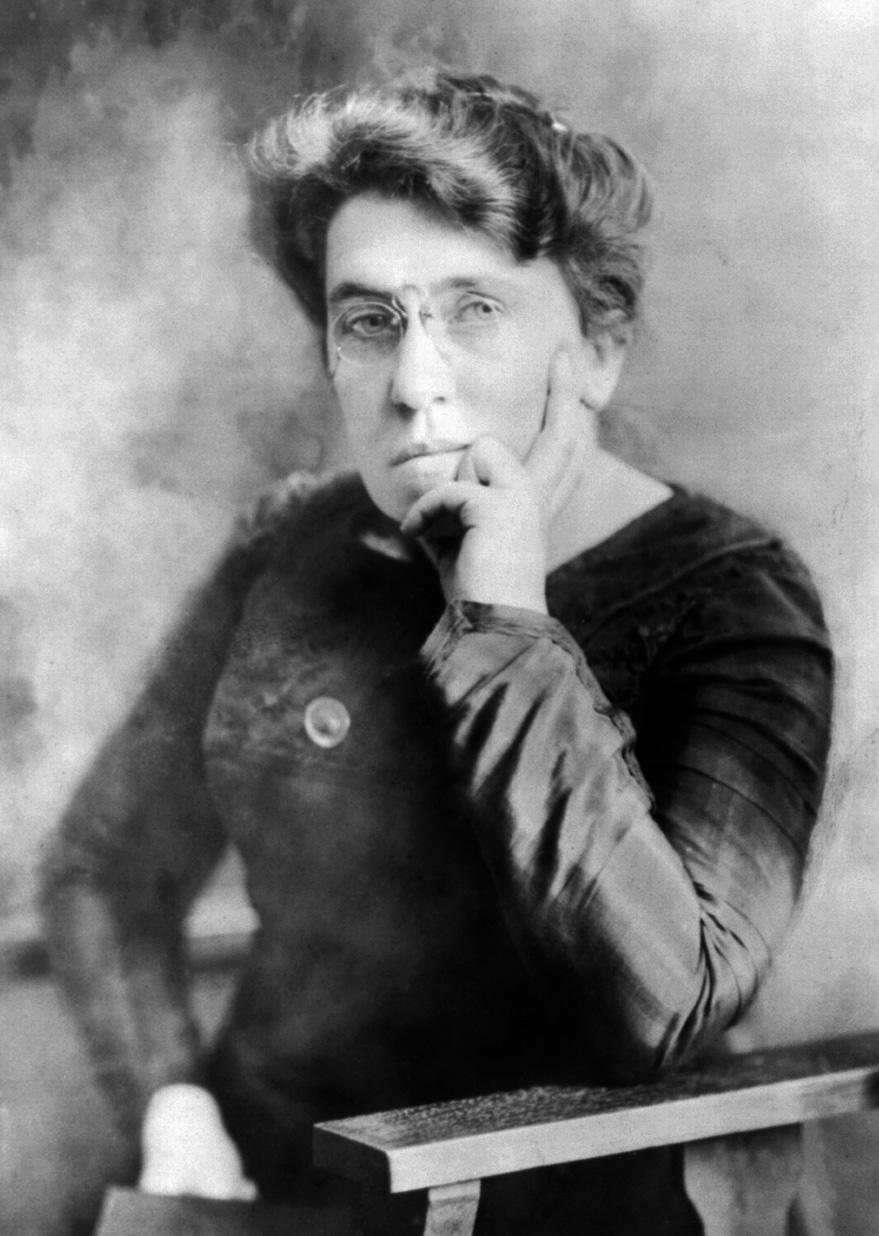
Emma Goldman, founder of anarcho-feminism

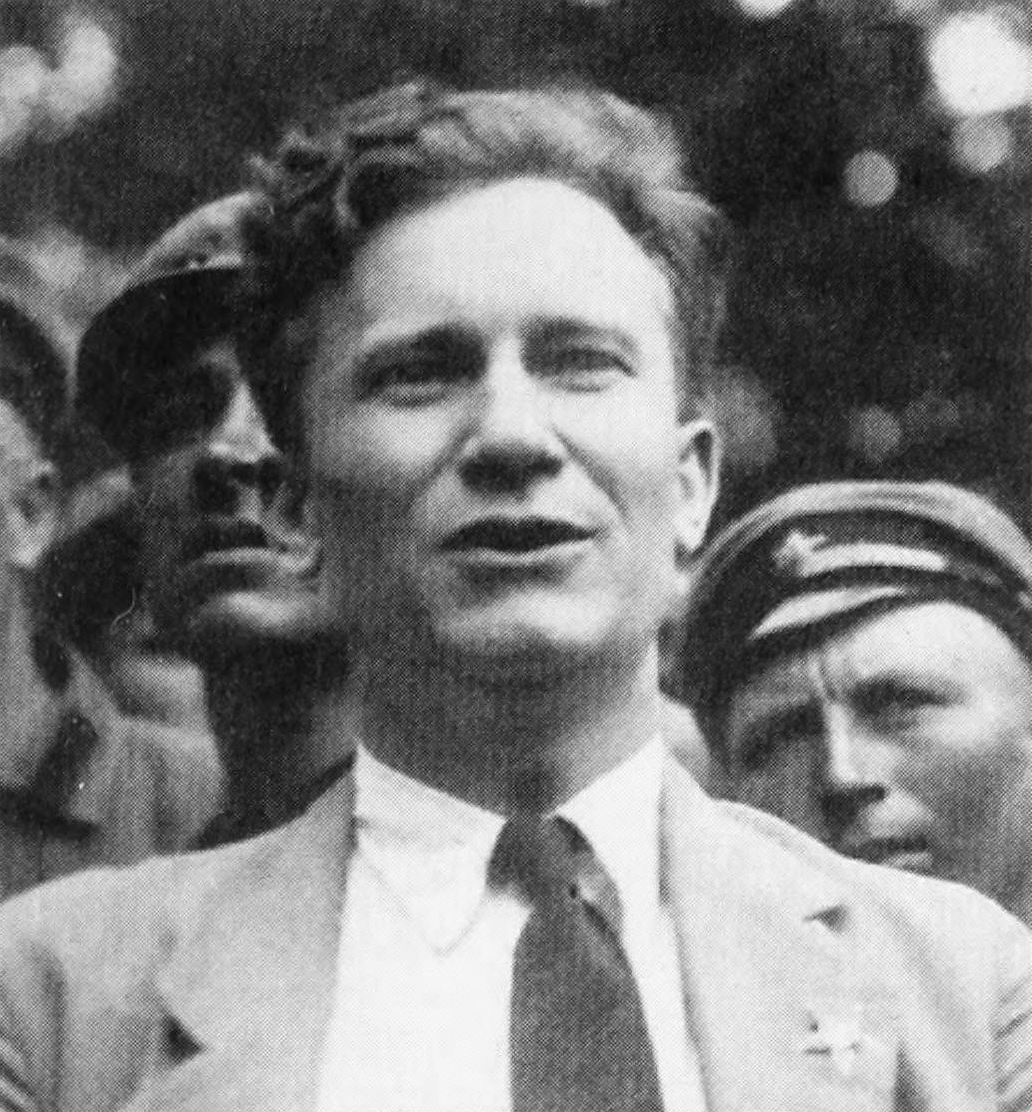
James P. Cannon, co-founder of the Communist League of America

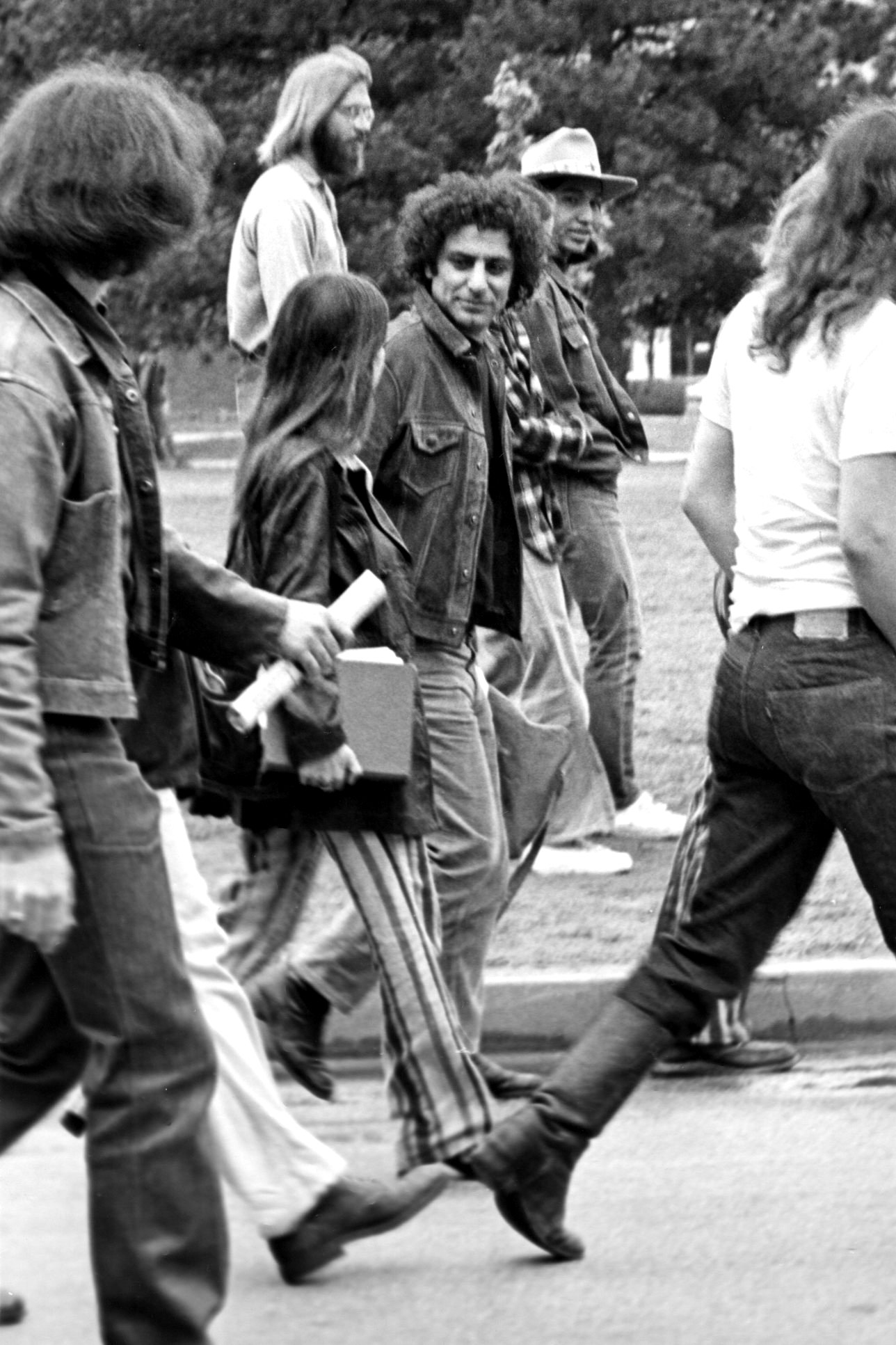
Abbie Hoffman, co-founder of the Youth International Party

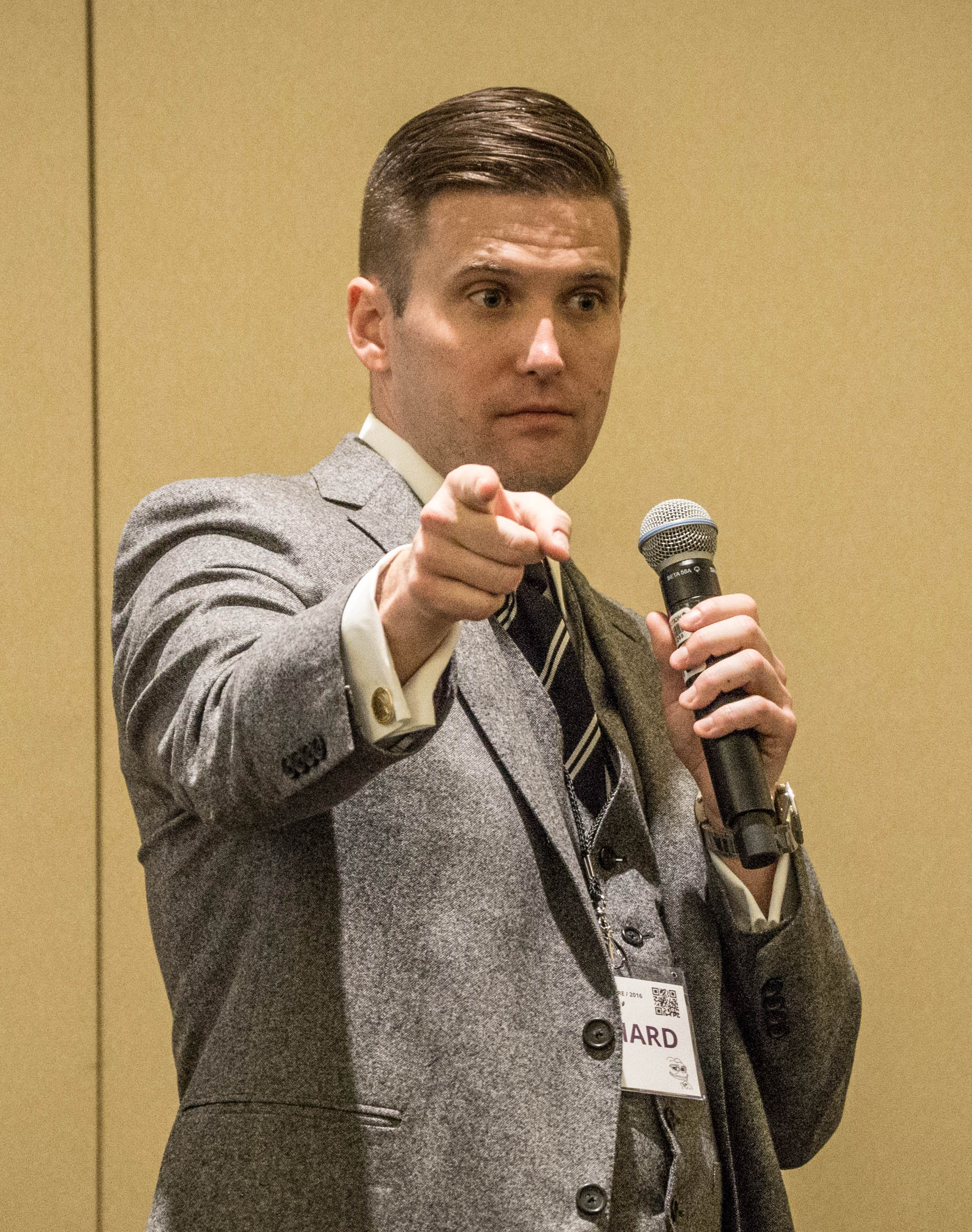
Richard B. Spencer, founder of the alt-right

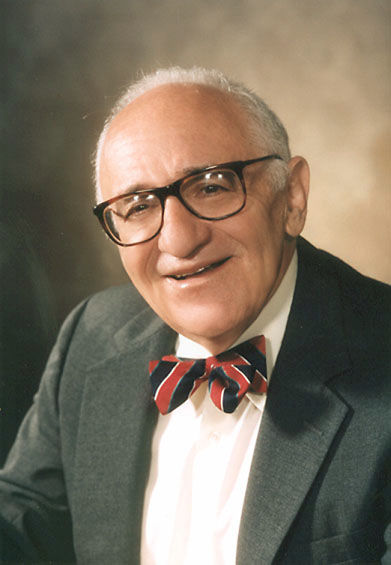
Murray Rothbard, founder of anarcho-capitalism

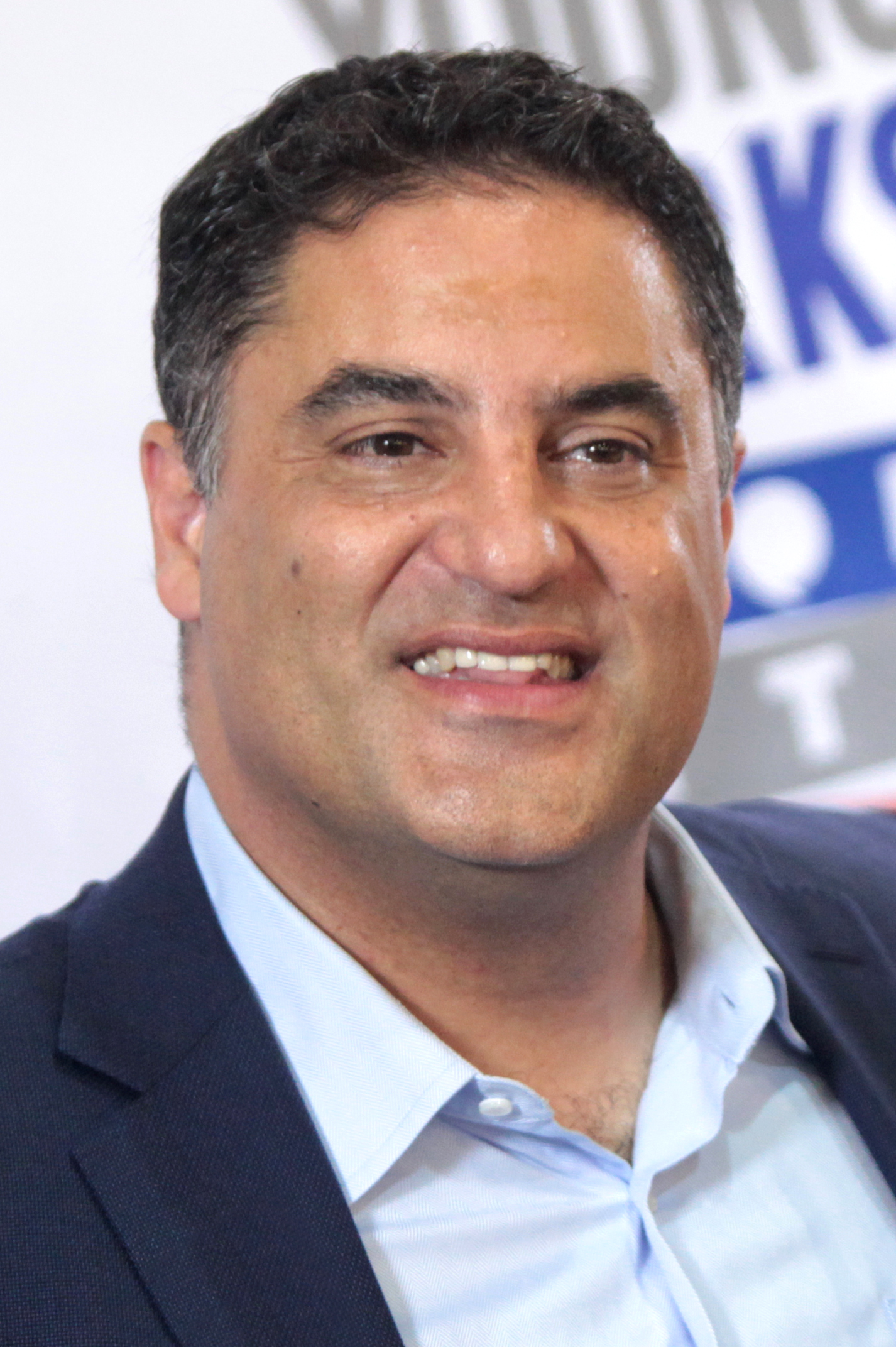
Cenk Uygur, co-founder of the Justice Democrats

=== Views of atheists ===
A June–September 2014 Pew Research Center survey found that 69% of atheist Americans identify as Democratic or lean Democratic, 17% have no lean, 15% identify as Republican, 56% liberal, 29% moderate, 10% conservative, and 5% don't know. Among Americans who believe in no gods, 65% identify as Democratic or lean Democratic, 17% have no lean, 18% identify as Republican, 50% liberal, 31% moderate, 13% conservative, and 6% don't know. That makes atheist and nonbelievers in god/gods Americans as belief groups to be the most politically liberal belief group in America and the least politically aligned belief group with Republicans and conservatism in the United States.

=== Views about atheists ===
In 2014, a Pew survey found that 53% of Americans claimed they would be less likely to vote for a presidential candidate who was an atheist.

=== Groups that include atheists ===
An October 2013 Public Religion Research Institute American Values Survey found 58% of American libertarians report they believe in a personal god, 25% believe god is an impersonal force in the universe, and 16% report that they do not believe in a god. It also found 73% of Americans who identify with the Tea Party report they believe in a personal god, 19% believe god is an impersonal force in the universe, and 6% report that they do not believe in a god. It also found 90% of white evangelical Protestants report they believe in a personal god, 8% believe god is an impersonal force in the universe, and less than 1% report that they do not believe in a god.

== Organizations ==
- American Atheists
- Atheist Alliance International
- The Clergy Project
- Freedom From Religion Foundation
- Freethinking Atheist and Agnostic Kinship
- International League of Non-Religious and Atheists
- Internet Infidels
- Military Association of Atheists and Freethinkers
- Rational Response Squad
- Recovering from Religion
- The Satanic Temple

== See also ==
- Atheism
- Discrimination against atheists in the United States
- Irreligion in the United States
- Religion in the United States
