= Casualism =

Casualism may refer to:

- Casualism (art), a 21st-century trend in the visual arts
- Casualism (philosophy), the view that the universe, its creation and development is solely based on randomness

== See also ==
- Casual labour, paid work on an irregular basis
- Causalism, the view that behavior and actions are the result of previous mental states
