= Christian deism =

Philosophy of religion

Christian deism is a standpoint in the philosophy of religion stemming from Christianity and deism. It can often refer to Deists who believe in the moral teachings—but not the divinity—of Jesus. John Adams and Thomas Jefferson are often cited as exemplars of this.

The earliest-found usage of the term Christian deism in print in English is in 1738 in a book by Thomas Morgan, appearing about ten times by 1800. The term Christian deist is found as early as 1722, in Christianity Vindicated Against Infidelity by Daniel Waterland (he calls it a misuse of language), and adopted later by Matthew Tindal in his 1730 work, Christianity as Old as the Creation.

Christian deism is influenced by Christianity, as well as both main forms of deism: classical and modern. In 1698 English writer Matthew Tindal published a pamphlet "The Liberty of the Press" as a Christian deist.

The philosophy adopts the ethics and non-mystical teachings of Jesus while denying that Jesus was a deity. Scholars of the Founding Fathers of the United States "have tended to place the founders' religion into one of three categories—non-Christian deism, Christian deism, and orthodox Christianity." John Locke and John Tillotson, especially, inspired Christian deism, through their respective writings. Possibly the most famed person to hold this position was Thomas Jefferson, who praised "nature's God" in the "Declaration of Independence" (1776) and edited the "Jefferson Bible"—a Bible with all reference to revelations and other miraculous interventions from a deity cut out.

In an 1803 letter to Joseph Priestley, Jefferson states that he conceived the idea of writing his view of the "Christian system" in a conversation with Benjamin Rush during 1798–99. He proposes beginning with a review of the morals of the ancient philosophers, moving on to the "deism and ethics of the Jews", and concluding with the "principles of a pure deism" taught by Jesus, "omit[ting] the question of his divinity, and even his inspiration."

Christian deists see no paradox in adopting the values and ideals espoused by Jesus without believing he was God. Without providing examples or citations, one author maintains, "A number of influential 17th- and 18th-century thinkers claimed for themselves the title of 'Christian deist' because they accepted both the Christian religion based on revelation and a deistic religion based on natural reason. This deistic religion was consistent with Christianity but independent of any revealed authority. Christian deists often accepted revelation because it could be made to accord with natural or rational religion."

== Overview ==
=== Deism ===
John Locke is often credited for his influence on Christian deism.

Deism is a humanist theological position (though encompassing a wide variety of view-points) concerning God's relationship with the natural world which emerged during the Scientific Revolution of 17th-century Europe and came to exert a powerful influence during the 18th-century Enlightenment. Deists reject atheism, and there were a number of different types of deists in the 17th and 18th centuries.

Deism holds that God does not intervene with the functioning of the natural world in any way, allowing it to run according to the laws of nature that he configured when he created all things. Because God does not control or interfere with his self-sustaining Creation, its component systems work in concert to achieve the balanced natural processes that make up the physical world. As such, human beings are "free agents in a free world." A "free agent" is someone who has authority and ability to choose his/her actions and who may make mistakes, and a "free world" is one which ordinarily operates as it is designed to operate and permits the consequential properties of failure and accident to be experienced by its inhabitants. God is thus conceived to be wholly transcendent and never immanent. For deists, human beings can only know God via reason and the observation of nature but not by revelation or supernatural manifestations (such as miracles)—phenomena which deists regard with caution if not skepticism.

Christian deism is one of several branches of deism to have come about over time:

Over time there have been other schools of thought formed under the umbrella of deism including Christian deism, belief in deistic principles coupled with the moral teachings of Jesus of Nazareth, and Pandeism, a belief that God became the entire universe and no longer exists as a separate being.

=== History ===
Williston Walker, in A History of the Christian Church, wrote: "In its milder form, it emerged as 'rational supernaturalism,' but in its central development it took the form of a full Christian Deism, while its radical wing turned against organized religion as anti-Christian Deism." "English Deism on the whole was a cautious, Christian Deism, largely restricted in influence to the upper classes. But a radical anti-Christian Deism, militant in its attack on organized Christianity, though with few supporters, accompanied it."

An early Christian deist wrote:

For God, according to these Philosophers, makes and governs a natural World that is capable of governing itself, and that might have made itself as well, had they not pass'd a needless and insignificant Compliment upon, the Creator. But I hope they will mend their Scheme, and compound this Matter for their own Honour, and not pretend to fay, that God has made a necessary World, or a self-existent System of Creatures. Yet this is the philosophical Scheme of Atheism, which its Patrons would fain call Deism, and in which the Christian Jews or Jewish Christians assist them, by joining inadvertently in the fame Cry. But if this be not a fine Scheme of Philosophy, let Christian Deism stand for an odd Sort of Religion, and let the Christian Jews be for ever orthodox, and be allow'd as the only religious Men in the World. It is certain, that if God governs moral Agents at all, he must; govern them by Hope and Fear, or by such a wise and suitable Application of Rewards and Punishments, as the different Circumstances of Persons, and the Ends of Government require. And these Rewards and Punishments must be such as are not the natural, necessary Consequences of the Actions themselves, themselves, since every one must see that this would be no Government at all, and that the Case, in this Respect, must be the very same whether we suppose any rectoral Justice, or any Presence or Operation of God in the World or not. And yet this which is really no Government at all, is all the general Providence which some seem willing to allow. But since those Gentlemen are all deep Philosophers, and above the gross Ignorance of the common Herd, I would here only ask them, What are the Laws of Nature ? What is the Law of Gravity, the Law of communicating Motion from one Body to another by Impulse, and the Law of the Vis -Inertia of Bodies ? Are these natural, essential and inherent Properties of the Bodies themselves, or are they the regular Effects of some universal, extrinsick Cause acting incessantly upon the whole material System, by such and such general Laws and Conditions of Agency?

Another wrote:

This may give the Reader some Notion of this Writer's Candour and Sincerity, and what we are to think of his pretended Regard for Christianity, which in Effect amounts to this: That the Christianity revealed in the Writings of the New Testament is Jewish Christianity; that is, Christianity corrupted and adulterated with Judaism, which according to him is the worst Religion in the World. But the true and genuine Christianity is Christian Deism, to be learned not from the Writings of the New Testament, but from the Volume of Nature, from every Man's own Breast, from the Heavens, the Earth, and especially the Brute Creatures, the genuine uncorrupted Instructors in our Author's Christianity. So that the "Gentlemen that assume to themselves the Title of Deists, seem resolved that for the future they only shall be called the true Christians too. Those that look upon the New Testament to be divinely inspired, and receive it as the Rule of their Faith, and take their Religion from thence, must be called Christian Jews, who only put a strange Mixture of inconsistent Religions upon the World for Christianity : whereas these Christian Deists teach it in its Purity, and in order to propagate pure uncorrupted Christianity they do their utmost to discard.the Writings of the New Testament, that Is, the Writings that give us aft Account of the Doctrines taught by Christ and his Apostles, But since these Gentlemen will not allow; us the honorable Title of Christians, it is but fair that they should leave us that of Free-Thinkers, to which I really think the Advocates for the Gospel Revelation have a much juster Pretension than they.

=== Christian foundation ===
In conjunction with deistic perspectives, Christian deism incorporates Christian tenets. Christian deists believe that Jesus Christ was a deist. Jesus taught that there are two basic laws of God governing humankind. The first law is that life comes from God and we are to use it as God intends, as illustrated in Jesus' parable of the talents. The second law is that God intends for human beings to live by love for each other, as illustrated in Jesus' parable of the good Samaritan.

Jesus summarized two basic "commandments" or laws of God as "love for God and love for neighbor." These two commandments through Christian deism were known to Jesus from the Hebrew scriptures but Jesus expanded the definition of "neighbor" to include everyone concerned in the natural world. "Love for God" means having an appreciation for God as the creator of the world and the source of human life. "Love for neighbor" means having an appreciation for the value of every human life. These are not laws or "truths" that Jesus received through some supernatural "revelation" according to Christian deism. In his "parable of the sower," Jesus taught that the "word of God" is known naturally because it is sown "in the heart" of everyone. For instance, the apostle Paul, who was a Jew, recognized that God's laws are known naturally by everyone. Paul wrote, "When Gentiles (non-Jews) who do not have the (Mosaic) law do by nature what the law requires, they are a law to themselves, even though they do not have the law. They show that what the law requires is written on their hearts" (Romans 2:14-15). Christian deism is therefore based on appreciation for all creation and on appreciation for every human life.

In his teachings, Jesus used examples from the natural world and from human nature to explain basic truths about life. In his parables, Jesus spoke of mustard seeds, wheat, weeds, fishing nets, pearls, vineyards, fig trees, salt, candlelight and sheep to illustrate his points. Jesus also used illustrations from human nature to teach basic concepts such as repentance, forgiveness, justice, and love.

Jesus called for people to follow God's laws, or commandments, so the "kingdom of God" could come "on earth as it is in heaven." As Jesus preached the "gospel", or good news, that the "kingdom of God is at hand," Christians deists believe the Romans viewed Jesus as a Jewish revolutionary seeking to liberate the Jews from Roman rule. Jesus refused to stop preaching his "gospel" even though he knew that he was risking crucifixion, the usual Roman penalty for revolutionaries. Jesus called for his followers to take this same risk, "If a man would come after me, let him deny himself and take up his cross and follow me. For whoever would save his life will lose it, and whoever loses his life for my sake and the gospel's will save it" (Mark 8:34-35).

After his crucifixion, Jesus' cross became a symbol of commitment to establishing the "kingdom of God" on earth. Christian deists are committed to following God's natural laws, as summarized in the two "commandments" to love God and love our neighbor.

== Different schools of thought ==
The broad spectrum of thought available within the idea of a Christian deism encompasses models of classical deism and pandeism with simple reverence for the message of tolerance claimed as espoused by the human Jesus, to belief in Jesus as a sort of naturally occurring divine figure, a mystical product of the rational processes of a rational universe. An example of the broadness attributed to Christian deism is found in this criticism of the position:

Christian Deist, i.e., a man who alleges that the Christian religion is nothing else than pure natural religion. The Deist, whom he introduces speaking, speaks with great presumption, as the ignorant are accustomed to do: that he neither possessed any acquaintance with the ancient languages nor with history, which he betrays in the very beginning, awakens no good anticipations in favour of Morgan, who appears in the person of the Deist. Morgan alleges with great boldness, that his religion of reason alone is divine, that the Christian is a mere invention and device of man, and through all ages since its introduction, has been regarded as such by a small but oppressed party: that the character of Judaism, which is not only human, but altogether devilish, cleaves still to the followers of a blind faith': that the apostle Paul was the chief of the freethinkers who wished to have no connexion with Judaism, and alone preached Christianity in its purity, whilst the other apostles were merely the chiefs of a political party who in the spirit of Judaism had attached themselves to it.

....

The freer Paulinian party, according to Morgan's view, had been from the first always persecuted and oppressed by the others; and although the Jewish Christians had afterwards fallen asunder and separated into various hostile sects, the same intolerant Jewish spirit still, in a greater or a less degree, animated them all, and they would not consent to relinquish the service of sacrifices; this spirit has given birth to a religion of priests among all those sects, which is immeasurably removed from the true religion. In addition, Morgan will not at all admit that his opinions approach in any respect to atheism, or that his object is to defend any thing similar to it; he alone, as he alleges, is a teacher of the true moral religion. It will not therefore be a matter of surprise, that a division of his book treats of the public forms of divine worship, and especially upon prayer. On the other hand, his Christian Deist will have nothing to do with sacrifices or satisfaction,—nothing with the vicarious death of Christ,—nothing with sacrifices and ceremonies,—with grace or election, which does not depend upon the merit of the person elected.

Christian deists do not worship Jesus as God. However, there are differing views concerning the exact nature of Jesus, as well as differing levels of hewing to traditional, orthodox deistic belief on this issue. There are two main theological positions.

=== Jesus as the Son of God ===
Of the Christian deists who look upon Jesus as the Son of God, (but not God himself), the Christian aspect of their faith is drawn from three main aspects of prior Christian thought.

They take a modified view of Pelagius, that there is no need for divine aid in performing good works and that the only "grace" necessary is the declaration of the law. They also hold a mild version of the moral influence theory of atonement philosophy. They combine these two philosophies with certain aspects of classical Unitarian theology. Indeed, mainstream deistic thought contributed to the rise of Unitarianism itself, with people in the 19th century increasingly self-identifying as Unitarians rather than as deists.

=== Jesus as a moral teacher ===
Christian deists who do not believe in Jesus as the son of God strongly reject any theories of atonement.

Different theories receive different levels of rejection, the strongest rejection being reserved for the theory of penal substitution, that claims that Jesus had to die as a sacrifice to pay the "death penalty" for humankind and save them from the "wrath" of God. These deists do not view God as a whimsical tyrant who sends plagues and pestilence to punish people on earth and who plans to torture people in "hell" in the future. Christian deists reject these ideas as products of human hatred and a failure to recognize God's natural laws of love for others.

Christian deists consider themselves to be disciples, or students, of Jesus because Jesus taught the natural laws of God but most believe that Jesus was only human. Jesus had to struggle with his own times of disappointment, sorrow, anger, prejudice, impatience, and despair, just as other human beings struggle with these experiences. Jesus never claimed to be perfect but he was committed to following God's natural laws of love.

== Diverging from Christianity and deism ==
Christian deism can differ from both mainstream deism and orthodox Christianity. This can occasionally be on the same subject but most often, Christian deism finds itself in agreement with one on a given theological topic, only to disagree on the next theological topic.

Christian deism is opposed to the doctrine of predestination in which everything that happens is thought to be the will of God, and instead tend to believe in the concept of free will. John Calvin was a proponent of the theory of predestination in which God allegedly determines everything that happens, whether good or bad. Christian deists believe that it is never God's will for anyone to be sick or injured. In that bad things occur as a result of prior interactions that resulted in a specified outcome. These bad things may be caused by interfering with naturalistic processes that result in negative consequences to life, or by human interaction on the surface of the Earth that leads to degrees of inhospitable conditions for others. Christian deists believe God gifted the human intellect to heal many illnesses, but God does not directly intervene to heal people on demand by some supernatural occurrence. Humans are believed to already have the endowed capacity to create synergies and contribute in some way toward the development of fairer societies on Earth, whether it be through scientific understanding or spiritual enlightenment. However, some Christian deists also strongly oppose the mainstream deistic notion that sacred texts like the Bible contain no revealed truths.

== See also ==
- Christian agnosticism
- Christian atheism
- Cultural Christian
- Jesuism
- Moralistic therapeutic deism
- Natural religion
- Nominal Christian
- Theistic rationalism
