= Cafeteria Christians =

Derogatory term for religious behavior

Cafeteria Christianity is a derogatory term used by some Christians, and others, to accuse other Christian individuals or denominations of selecting which Christian doctrines they will follow, and which they will not, similar to how one picks and chooses what food to select in a cafeteria.

== Interpretation ==
The related term "cafeteria Catholicism" is a pejorative term applied to Catholics who dissent from Roman Catholic moral teaching on issues such as abortion, birth control, premarital sex, masturbation or homosexuality. The term is less frequently applied to those who dissent from other Catholic moral teaching on issues such as social justice, capital punishment, or just war.

However, not all people take Cafeteria Christianity to be derogatory. There is quite a bit of self-identification of people as "Cafeteria Christians." Politician James Carville, a Democrat, has been described as "the ultimate cafeteria Catholic." Carville said, "Everybody in some way or another takes what they want. The real thing is how we treat each other." Author Mary Karr, a convert from agnosticism, was also reported to have been a dissenter of some Catholic teaching. Having been a feminist since she was 12, Karr is pro-choice on abortion and she supports the ordination of women to the priesthood. British actress Patsy Kensit said in an interview with The Guardian that she is an à la carte Catholic, though appreciative of "all the pomp and ceremony" of the church.

== Cafeteria Catholicism ==
Cafeteria Catholicism is a term that is related, but not the same as Cafeteria Christianity. The term Cafeteria Catholic is applied to those who assert a Catholic faith, yet dissent from one or more doctrinal or moral teachings of the Catholic Church, or who are viewed as dissenting by those who use the term.

== Christian atheism/Cultural Christian ==
Cultural Christians are deists, pantheists, agnostics, atheists, and antitheists who adhere to Christian values and appreciate Christian culture. This kind of identification may be due to various factors, such as family background, personal experiences, and the social/cultural environment in which they grew up.

Christian atheism is a form of cultural Christianity and ethics system drawing its beliefs and practices from Jesus' life and teachings as recorded in the New Testament Gospels and other sources, whilst rejecting supernatural claims of Christianity. Christian Atheists may attend church, however, they do not have to attend Christian church services, or any church services to be considered a Christian Atheist. A Christian Atheist is one who doubts or rejects altogether the conventional notions of God, but still follows the moral aspects of the religion.

== Sunday Christian ==
A Sunday Christian (also known as a once-a-weeker) is a derisive term used to refer to someone who typically attends Christian Church services on Sundays, but is presumed or witnessed not to adhere to the doctrines or rules of the religion. Sunday Christians may refuse to register as an official church member. These Christians are sometimes considered to be hypocritical in how or what they practice^{[1]} due in part to their confusion or cherry-picking how they live their religion.^{[2]}

== See also ==
- Nominal Christian
- Cafeteria Catholicism
- Cultural Christian
- Biblical law in Christianity
- Lapsed Catholic
- Christian atheism
- Nondenominational Christianity
- Hermeneutics
- Takfir
