= Cafeteria Catholicism =

Ideology containing some, but not all, of the doctrines of orthodox Catholicism

Cafeteria Catholic, also called à la carte, is an informal term used to describe a follower of Catholicism who dissents from certain official doctrinal or moral teachings of the Catholic Church. Polling indicates that many Catholics dissent from the institutional hierarchy on at least one issue.

Several instances of this include Catholics who support abortion, masturbation, or find no moral objections to birth control.

== Use in print ==
An early use in print of "cafeteria Catholic" appears in 1971:

"cafeteria Catholic" [...] a little of this and none of that

— Redemptorists

A later use of "cafeteria Catholicism" appears in Fidelity, 1986:

"Cafeteria Catholicism" allows us to pick those "truths" by which we will measure our lives as Catholics. [...] "Cafeteria Catholicism" is what happens when the stance of Protagoras, regarding man as the measure of all things, gets religion – but not too much.

— Fidelity, 1986, published by the Wanderer Forum Foundation

A different distinction, in the term communal Catholicism, had already been used in 1976.

== Use of the term ==
The term is most often used by conservative Catholics critical of progressive Catholics. The term has been in use since the issuance of Humanae Vitae, an official document that propounded the Church's opposition to the use of artificial birth control and advocates natural family planning.

The term has no status in official Catholic teachings. However, the practice of denying adherence to the sexual morality of the Church has been criticized by Pope John Paul II stated in his talk to the Bishops in Los Angeles in 1987:

It is sometimes reported that a large number of Catholics today do not adhere to the teaching of the Catholic Church on a number of questions, notably sexual and conjugal morality, divorce and remarriage. Some are reported as not accepting the clear position on abortion. It has to be noted that there is a tendency on the part of some Catholics to be selective in their adherence to the Church's moral teaching. It is sometimes claimed that dissent from the Magisterium is totally compatible with being a "good Catholic," and poses no obstacle to the reception of the Sacraments. This is a grave error that challenges the teaching of the Bishops in the United States and elsewhere.

During morning Mass at the Domus Sanctae Marthae, Pope Francis, speaking of those who are rigidly conservative, assert 'alternative' views, or simply find a way to profit as figures in the church, said, "They may call themselves Catholic, but they have one foot out the door."

== Surveys on dissenting Catholic laity worldwide ==
In 2014, the U.S. Spanish-language network Univision commissioned a World Values Survey of 12,038 self-identified Catholics in 12 countries with substantial Catholic populations across the world, representing 61% of the world's Catholic population and covering nine languages spread across five continents. It found that majorities of Catholics globally and in most regions disagreed with Church teachings on divorce, abortion, and contraception, with greater intra- and inter-national division on gay marriage and the ordination of women and divorced men. Favourable views about the Pope (Francis) did not influence Catholics who disagreed with at least some of the church's teachings. Overall, a higher proportion of Third World Roman Catholics (notably Africa and the Philippines) accepted the official doctrines on these subjects, while those in Western countries tended to disagree with many of them. In the United States and Spain, the majority of Catholics supported gay marriage, followed by France at 43% support.

The founder of World Values Survey, Ronald Inglehart said:

This is a balancing act. They have to hold together two increasingly divergent constituencies. The church has lost its ability to dictate what people do. Right now, the less-developed world is staying true to the old world values, but it's gradually eroding even there. [Pope Francis] doesn't want to lose the legitimacy of the more educated people.

Francis requested that parishes provide answers to an official questionnaire regarding the current opinions among the laity. He also continued to assert present Catholic doctrine in less dramatic tone than his more direct predecessors who maintained that the Catholic Church is not a democracy of popular opinion.

Francis launched his own survey of Catholic opinion in November 2013. Religion sociologist Linda Woodhead of Lancaster University wrote of the survey, "it's not a survey in any sense that a social scientist would recognize", stating her opinion that ordinary Catholics would have difficulty understanding the theological jargon involved. Nevertheless, Woodhead posited that the survey could be influential:

But surveys are dangerous things. They raise expectations. And they play to people's growing sense that they have voice and choice—even in a traditional Church. If it turns out that those voices are ignored or, worse, corralled more firmly into the existing sheepfold of moral teaching, the tension may reach a breaking point. Perhaps Francis is clever enough to have anticipated that, and perhaps he has subtle plans to turn such a crisis to good ends. Perhaps not.

— Linda Woodhead

=== United States ===
In 2001, Gertrude Himmelfarb reported that:

"Cafeteria Catholics," as they are derogatorily called, observe only those teachings of the church that they find congenial. Four–fifths of all Catholics believe that birth control is "entirely up to the individual," and two–thirds that "one can be a good Catholic without going to Mass." Among those who call themselves "Modernists," little more than a third are opposed to abortion.

== Notable proponents ==
Some notable Catholics have either been explicitly associated or identified with the term. Politician James Carville, a Democrat, has been described as "the ultimate cafeteria Catholic". Carville said, "Everybody in some way or another takes what they want. The real thing is how we treat each other." Author Mary Karr, a convert from agnosticism, was also reported to have been a dissenter of some Catholic teaching. Having been a feminist since she was 12, Karr is pro-choice on abortion and she supports the ordination of women to the priesthood. British actress Patsy Kensit said in an interview with The Guardian that she is an à la carte Catholic, though appreciative of "all the pomp and ceremony" of the church.

== See also ==
- Cafeteria Christianity
- Cafeteria Christians
- Catholic atheism
- Cultural Christian
- Heresy
- Lapsed Catholic
- Mater si, magistra no
- Moralistic therapeutic deism
- Nicodemite (Crypto-Protestantism, Crypto-Judaism, Crypto-Islam)
- Nominal Christian
- Recovering Catholic
- Criticism of the Catholic Church § Partial commitment
