= Sohail Ahmed (disambiguation) =

Sohail Ahmed may also refer to:

- Sohail Ahmed (comedian) (born 1963), Pakistani comedian
- Sohail Ahmed (cricketer) (born 1985), Pakistani first-class cricketer
- Sohail Ahmed (boxer) (born 1979), Pakistani boxer
- Sohail Ahmed (former Islamist) (born 1992), reformed former radical Islamist and activist
