= Cultural Hindus =

Non-practicing Hindus who still identify with Hindu culture and heritage

A Cultural Hindu is a religiously unobservant individual who identifies with Hinduism, usually due to family background.

== Definition ==
Emory University professor John Y. Fenton defines the locution as follows:

The term "cultural Hindu" generally refers to Desis with a Hindu family background who have low observance of religious practices and whose identification with the Hindu religious tradition is primarily cultural or communal.

The term has come into vogue as a result of secularization. Cultural Hindus, while not religiously devout, may still observe and celebrate Hindu festivals, such as Diwali. For these individuals, this commemoration of Hindu festivals, as well as occasional temple attendance, serve as a celebration of their heritage.

== See also ==
- Hindu atheism
- Cultural Christians, Christian culture
- Cultural Jews, Jewish culture
- Cultural Muslims, Islamic culture
