= Cultural Muslims =

Non-practicing Muslims who still identify with Islam

Cultural Muslims, also known as secular Muslims, nominal Muslims, non-practicing Muslims or non-observing Muslims, are people who identify as Muslim but are not practicing. They may variously be non-observing, secular, irreligious, or individuals who still identify with Islam due to belief, spirituality, family backgrounds, personal experiences, ethnic and national heritage, or the social and cultural environment in which they grew up.

Cultural Muslims can be found across the world and in several countries and regions, self-reported Muslims practice the religion at low levels, and for some, their "Muslim" identity is associated with cultural or ethnic or national heritage, rather than merely religious faith.

Reactions to the concept exhibit considerable variance across Islamic communities, manifesting as either curiosity or indifference, particularly concerning individuals devoid of a prior Muslim identity. Conversely, Cultural Muslims are frequently classified as kafir (non-believers) by fundamentalist factions, who perceive previously devout individuals as having gone "astray".

== Definition ==
In Central Asia and in former communist countries, the term "cultural Muslim" came into use to describe those who wished their "Muslim" identity to be associated with certain national and ethnic rituals, rather than merely religious faith.

Malise Ruthven (2000) discussed the terms "cultural Muslim" and "nominal Muslim" as follows:

There is, however, a secondary meaning to Muslim which may shade into the first. A Muslim is one born to a Muslim father who takes on his or her parents' confessional identity without necessarily subscribing to the beliefs and practices associated with the faith, just as a Jew may describe him- or herself as Jewish without observing the Tanakh or Halacha. In non-Muslim societies, such Muslims may subscribe to, and be vested with, secular identities. The Muslims of Bosnia, descendants of Slavs who converted to Islam under Ottoman rule, are not always noted for attendance at prayer, abstention from alcohol, and other social practices associated with believing Muslims in other parts of the world. They were officially designated as Muslims by nationality to distinguish them from Orthodox Serbs and Catholic Croats under the former Yugoslav communist regime. The label Muslim indicates their ethnicity and group allegiance, but not necessarily their religious beliefs. In this limited context (which may apply to other Muslim minorities in Europe and Asia), there may be no contradiction between being Muslim and being atheist or agnostic, just as there are Jewish atheists and Jewish agnostics. This secular definition of Muslim (sometimes the terms cultural Muslim or nominal Muslim are used) is very far from being uncontested.

Scholar G. Hussein Rassool (2015) discussed the label "cultural Muslim" as follows:

The label 'Cultural Muslim' is used in the literature to describe those Muslims who are religiously unobservant, secular or irreligious individuals who still identify with the Muslim culture due to family background, personal experiences, or the social and cultural environment in which they grew up.

A cultural Muslim internalizes the Islamic cultural tradition, or way of thinking, as a frame of reference. Cultural Muslims are diverse in terms of norms, values, political opinions, and religious views. They retain a shared "discourse or structure of feeling" related to shared history and memories. The concept of a cultural Muslim – someone who identifies as a Muslim yet is not religious – is not always met with acceptance in Islamic communities.

=== Believer vs. non-believer and practicing vs. not-practicing ===
In non-Muslim majority countries, Muslims may identify themselves by distinguishing themselves as practicing vs. not-practicing and believer vs. non-believer. Usually, ritual practicing ones are presumed to be believers, while non-practicing ones may be believers or non-believers.

== Demographics ==
According to scholar Ibrahim Warde the majority of the Muslims in the Balkans are considered 'cultural' or 'nominal' Muslims. Scholar Adeeb Khaled cited that the majority of the Muslims in Central Asia and Russia are cultural or nominal Muslims. There are significant segment of Muslim immigrants in the United States and Western Europe who are cultural or nominal Muslims, particularly among second-generation immigrants, where their "Muslim" identity associated with cultural or ethnic heritage rather than merely religious faith. According to an Islamic scholar Tariq Ramadan "most Muslim Westerners do not practice their religion regularly", and some define themselves as merely "cultural" Muslims.

=== Albania ===
According to scholars, the majority of Muslims in Albania are 'nominal' or 'cultural' Muslims. In a Pew research center survey of Muslim Albanians in 2012, religion was important for only 15%, while 7% prayed, around 5% went to a mosque, 43% gave zakat (alms), 44% fasted during Ramadan and 72% expressed a belief in God and Muhammad.

A medical study from 2008 in Tirana on the relationship between religious observance and acute coronary syndrome found out that 67% of the Muslims interviewed were completely religiously non-observant. The regular attendance of religious institutions (at least once every 2 weeks) was low (6%), and weekly attendance was very low (2%). Frequent praying (at least 2 to 3 times per week) among and among the Muslims we were asked it was around 17%, and praying several times daily (as required of devout Muslims) was rare (2%). Regular fasting during Ramadan was similarly low (5%). Also in Albania according to one study only 36.8% of the males are circumcised, with the rate being 46.5% for those from Muslim background even though for Muslims in general it is an almost universal Islamic custom.

=== Azerbaijan ===
Azerbaijan is a mostly a nominal Shia Muslim majority country, with more than 96% of its population being nominally Muslim. According to scholars the majority of Muslims in Azerbaijan are 'nominal' or 'cultural' Muslims. A 1998 survey estimated the proportion of ardent believers in Azerbaijan at close to 7 percent, slightly more than the number of declared atheists – almost 4 percent – with the largest numbers falling into the category of those who consider Islam above all as a way of life, without strict observance of prohibitions and requirements, or as a fundamental part of national identity.

According to a 2009 Gallup Poll, Azerbaijan is one of the most irreligious countries in the Muslim world, with about 54% of respondents indicating the importance of religion in their life as little or none. The same poll indicates that only 21% of the respondents have attended religious services. Gallup International indicated that only 34% of Azerbaijanis adhere to religious practices, and ranked Azerbaijan the 13th least religious country from data compiled in 2005, 2008 and 2015. It is a secular country by its constitution, and according to James Reynolds of BBC News one of the goals of the secular government of Azerbaijan is to "check the spread of political Islam".

=== Belgium ===
Surveys conducted 1994 and 1996 observed a decrease in religiosity based on lowering mosque participation, less frequent prayer, dropping importance attached to a religious education, etc. This decrease in religiosity was more visible in younger Muslims; however, other more recent studies show that while participation in religious activities among young Muslims is reducing, they are more likely to identify with Islam culturally.

A 2005 Université Libre de Bruxelles study estimated that about 10% of the Muslim population in Belgium are "practicing Muslims". A 2009 survey found that the majority of Muslims in Belgium supported "separation between religion and state". A 2010 study found that while Muslims put great emphasis on religious freedom and the overwhelming majority stated people should be free to leave Islam if they wanted, they were less comfortable with the idea of Muslims marrying non-Muslims.

=== Bosnia and Herzegovina ===
Bosniaks have been described as "Cultural Muslims" or "Progressive Muslims". Bosnian Muslims tend to often be described as moderate, secular and European-oriented compared to other Muslim groups. In a Pew research center survey of Muslim Bosnians in 2012, religion was important for 36%, while 14% prayed and around 14% went to a mosque.

=== Bulgaria ===
Evgenia Ivanova of the New Bulgarian University stated in 2011 that "religion is not of primary importance to Bulgaria's Muslims." The New Bulgarian University conducted a survey of 850 Muslims in Bulgaria, which found that 48.6% described themselves as religious, 28.5% of which were very religious. Approximately 41% never went to a mosque and 59.3% did not pray at home. About 0.5% believed that disputes should be resolved using Islamic Sharia law and 79.6% said that wearing a veil in school was "unacceptable". More than half of the respondents said cohabitation without marriage was "acceptable", 39.8% ate pork and 43.3% drank alcohol. On the contrary, 88% of respondents said they circumcised their boys and 96% observed Muslim burial practices for their relatives.

According to a 2017 Pew Research Center survey, 33% of Bulgarian Muslims responded that religion is "very important" in their lives. The same survey found that 7% of Bulgarian Muslims pray all five salah, 22% attend mosque at least once a week, and 6% read Quran at least once a week.

=== Denmark ===
In a 2005 survey, 40% of Muslim immigrants and their descendants participated in religious ceremonies/services compared to 60% of Roman Catholic immigrants/ descendants did the same. In a 2008 survey of immigrants from Turkey, Pakistan, ex-Yugoslavia, Iran, Iraq, and Somalia, 37% considered themselves very little/little religious, 33% considered themselves moderately religious, 24% considered themselves very religious. A 2011 survey found that 37% of Danish Muslims were non-practicing Muslims.

=== France ===
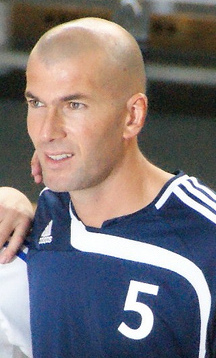
Zinedine Zidane identifies as a "non-practicing Muslim".

According to a survey, only 33% of French Muslims who were interviewed said they were practicing believers. That figure is the same as that obtained by the INED/INSEE survey in October 2010. And 20% claimed to go regularly to the mosque for the Friday service, and 31% practice prayer (salat), and 70% said they "observe Ramadan". According to expert Franck Fregosi: "Although fasting during Ramadan is the most popular practice, it ranks more as a sign of Muslim identity than piety, and it is more a sign of belonging to a culture and a community", and he added that not drinking alcohol "seems to be more a cultural behavior".

=== Indonesia ===
Classical documentations divide Indonesian Muslims between "nominal" Muslims, or abangan, whose lifestyles are more oriented toward non-Islamic cultures, and "orthodox" Muslims, or santri, who adhere to the Orthodox Islamic norms. Abangan was considered an indigenous blend of native and Hindu-Buddhist beliefs with Islamic practices sometimes also called Javanism, kejawen, agama Jawa, or kebatinan. According to a study in 1999, 17.3% of the Muslims in Indonesia who took part in it identified themselves as secularists who never or rarely perform Islamic devotions.

=== Israel ===
According to a study published by Pew Research Center in 2016, while Muslims living in Israel, overall, are more religious than Israeli Jews, they are less religious than Muslims living in many other countries in the Middle East. Muslim women are more likely than men to say that religion has high importance in their lives, and younger Muslims are generally less observant than their elders. The nature of Muslim identity varies among Israeli Muslims: 45% of Muslims say their identity is mainly a matter of religion, 29% say being Muslim is mainly about ancestry and/or culture, and 26% say their identity is characterized by a combination of religion and ancestry/culture.

According to the Israel Democracy Institute survey conducted in 2015, 47% of Israeli Muslims identified as traditional, 32% identified as religious, 17% identified as not religious at all, and 3% identified as very religious.

=== Kosovo ===
The overwhelming majority of Kosovo Albanians are cultural/nominal Muslims, according to a 2012 survey by Pew Research Center. 13% of those interviewed said that they attend Friday prayer once a week and 40% say they never visit their local mosque, while 81% expressed a belief in God and Muhammad.

=== Malaysia ===
According to Tajuddin Rasdi of the Islamic Renaissance Front, about 9% of Muslims in Malaysia are cultural Muslims who do not strictly follow all the tenets of the faith. Most abstain from pork and fast during Ramadan, but some may also consume alcohol and do not always perform the daily prayers. Cultural Muslims in Malaysia observe the more performative aspects of the religion, including circumcision, wedding ceremonies, funerary rites, and celebrating Muslim festivals such as Eid, effectively viewing them more as tradition to be followed out of respect for family ties and cultural heritage. At the same time, their own personal convictions and approaches to religion, if any, may vary or differ significantly from conventional interpretations of Islam.

=== Morocco ===
A survey of about 2,400 Moroccans by Arab Barometer found that due to COVID-19 pandemic the levels of religiosity in Morocco have increased: in 2021 about 6% answered that they are "not religious", 39% said they are "somewhat religious", and 51% "religious", compared to 13% who answered that they are "not religious", 44% said they are "somewhat religious", and 38% "religious" in 2019.

=== Netherlands ===
In 2009, according to a study only 24% of Muslims who took part in the survey in the Netherlands attended mosque once a week according to a survey. According to the same 2004 survey, they found that the importance of Islam in the lives of Dutch Muslims, particularly of second-generation immigrants was decreasing. This observation was based on the reducing participation of younger Muslims in Islamic rituals, organizations, and prayer. The study also predicted that the trend would continue with increasing education and "individualization". However, the study also found that second-generation immigrants attached more importance to religion that the first generation as an "individual experience". The study concluded "the expression of religiosity by Muslim youth was not much different to that of their Dutch Christian or Jewish peers".

=== Northern Cyprus ===
In Northern Cyprus, the Turkish Cypriots are generally very secular and seen as cultural Muslims, and only attend mosques on special occasions (such as for weddings, funerals, and community gatherings). The secularizing force of Kemalism has also exerted an impact on Turkish Cypriots. Religious practices are considered a matter of individual choice and many do not actively practice their religion. Alcohol is frequently consumed within the community and most Turkish Cypriot women do not cover their heads. Turkish Cypriot males are generally circumcised at a young age in accordance with religious beliefs, although, this practice appears more related to custom and tradition than to powerful religious motivation.

=== Norway ===
Studies conducted for a TV channel in 2006 found that 18% of Norwegian Muslims reported visiting the mosque once a week. A similar study in 2007 reported that 36% of Muslim youth visit the mosque less than once a month. According to scholar Christine Jacobsen many Muslim youth in Norway are nominal or cultural Muslims, and they identify as such only because of cultural heritage rather than because of religious conviction.

According to a 2007/2008 survey of students at upper secondary schools in Oslo, 25% of Muslims pray regularly while 12% attend religious services weekly.

=== Russia ===
According to a 2012 survey by Pew Research Center, 12% of Russian Muslims who were asked say that they attend Friday prayer once a week and 33% say they never visit their local mosque, and 89% expressed a belief in God and Muhammad.

=== Sweden ===
Scholar Åke Sander claimed in 1992 that at most 40–50% of the people of Muslim background in Sweden "could reasonably be considered to be religious", and in 2004, based on discussions and interviews with Muslim leaders, concerning second-generation Muslims born and raised in Sweden that "it does not seem that the percentage they consider to be religious Muslims in a more qualified sense exceeds fifteen percent, or perhaps even less". Sander re-stated in 2004 that "we do not think it unreasonable to put the figure of religious Muslims in Sweden at the time of writing at close to 150,000". According to Göran Larsson a "great majority of people with a Muslim cultural background are as secular or irreligious".

=== Turkey ===
In a poll conducted by Sabancı University in 2006 16% of Turkish Muslims said they were "extremely religious"', 39% said they were "somewhat religious", and 32% said they were "not religious".

Many ethnic Turkish people are either cultural or non-practicing Muslims, and many cultural or non-practicing Turkish Muslims tend to be politically secular or kemalist Many of the Turkish people only attend mosques on special occasions (such as for weddings, funerals, and community gatherings), according to a 2012 survey by Pew Research Center, 19% of Turkish Muslims say that they attend Friday prayer once a week and 23% say they never visit their local mosque. In general, "Turkish Islam" is considered to be "more moderate and pluralistic" compared to the Middle Eastern-Islamic societies.

=== United States ===
According to the Pew Research Center in a 2014 survey, 1% of American Muslims do not believe in God. The frequency of receiving answers to prayers among Muslims was, 31% at least once a week and 12% once or twice a month.

There are significant segment of Muslim immigrants in the United States who are cultural Muslims. For instance, many Turkish Americans identify as cultural Muslims.

== Criticism ==
According to Kia Abdullah, cultural Muslims are at the receiving end of criticism not only from Muslims but also from some progressives, saying that cultural Muslim cherry-pick the best of both worlds without enough proactive contribution and commitment to liberalism.

== Notable people ==
- Bella Hadid: She shared during an interview with Porter that she is "proud to be a Muslim", but also stated that she lives a spiritual lifestyle, and although her family was not religious, she grew up learning about Judaism and is interested in Islam. "I'm very spiritual, and I find that I connect with every religion," she explained. "There's that my-way-is-the-right-way thing in human nature, but for me it's not about my god or your god. I kind of just call on whoever is willing to be there for me."
- Cenk Uygur: Although he is agnostic, he still identifies as a cultural Muslim.
- Fatima Bhutto: Said in an interview that she is a cultural Muslim, and describes herself as a secularist.
- Kia Abdullah: In 2020, she stated that she identifies as an agnostic and a cultural Muslim.
- Marat Safin: While he does not really believe in a God, he identifies as an "ethnic Muslim"
- Mehmet Oz: He identifies as a "secular Muslim".
- Laila Rouass: She was raised Muslim but is now non-practising, although she calls the Islamic faith an important part of her identity.
- Mohammad "Mo" Gawdat: chief business officer for Google X does not believe in traditional narrative of islam.
- Mohamed Hadid: The father of Bella Hadid and Gigi Hadid does not consider himself a devout Muslim.
- Mustafa Suleyman: co-founder of Google's deepmind, now being a CEO of Microsoft AI talks about being a secular Muslim on Sam Harris' podcast
- Naseeruddin Shah: Said he and Javed Akhtar are non-practicing Muslims.
- Orhan Pamuk: He describes himself as a cultural Muslim who associates the historical and cultural identification with the religion, while not believing in a personal connection to God.
- Sajid Javid: While his family's heritage is Muslim, Javid himself is non-practicing, but has remarked that he was 'the first Muslim Home Secretary to be invited (to the iftar)', whereas his wife is a practicing Christian.
- Salman Khan: Khan identifies as both Muslim and Hindu, commenting that, "I'm Hindu and Muslim both. I'm Bharatiya (an Indian)". He explained, "My father is Muslim and my mother is Hindu".
- Sohail Ahmed: He describes himself as a cultural Muslim.
- Fareed Zakaria: Zakaria is a self-described secular and non-practicing Muslim. He added: "My views on faith are complicated – somewhere between deism and agnosticism. I am completely secular in my outlook." His ex-wife is a Christian, and his three children have not been raised as Muslims.
- Hasan Piker: He describes himself as culturally Muslim and said he is not a committed follower of the faith.
- Nuseir "Nas Daily" Yasin: stated that he is both an agnostic and non-religious Muslim.
- Shohreh Aghdashloo: despite being born a Muslim, she has stated that she has never practiced it.
- T-Pain: he was raised in a Muslim household, but he lacked interest in the religion. His wife is a Christian, but his three children follow both religions.
- Zinedine Zidane: he has described himself as a "non-practising Muslim".
- O'Shea "Ice Cube" Jackson: he converted to Islam in the early 1990s after being introduced to Nation of Islam though he denied membership to the group. Listening to his own conscience, he self-described as a "natural Muslim, 'cause it's just me and God. You know, going to the mosque, the ritual and the tradition, it's just not in me to do. So I don't do it." He has also said that he thinks "religion is stupid" in part and explained, "I'm gonna live a long life, and I might change religions three or four times before I die. I'm on the Islam tip – but I'm on the Christian tip, too. I'm on the Buddhist tip as well. Everyone has something to offer to the world."
- Zayn Malik: has stated he no longer identifies as a practicing Muslim, though he retains a connection to his muslim upbringing and cultural heritage.
- Shabana Azmi: Stated that she loves Eid, gharara, and loves Urdu language, food as a cultural Muslim, but does not practice religion.

== See also ==
- Abangan
- Hermeneutics of feminism in Islam
- Islam and secularism
- Islamic culture
- Folk Islam
- Islamic feminism
- Crypto-Islam
- Islamization
- Liberalism and progressivism within Islam
- Muslims (ethnic group)
- White Turks
- Taqiya
- Zindīq
- Islamic culture
- Secular Muslim
- Quranist

=== Parallel concepts ===
- Cultural Christians, Nominal Christian, Lapsed Catholic
- Cultural Hindus
- Jewish secularism, Jewish atheism
- Cultural Mormon
- Irreligion
- Non-denominational Muslim
- Spiritual but not religious

== Bibliography ==
- Yilmaz, Selman. Cultural Muslims: Background Forces and Factors Influencing Everyday Religiosity of Muslim People. December 2014 DOI:10.7596/taksad.v3i3.360
