= Liu Xiaofeng (academic) =

Chinese philosopher

Liu Xiaofeng (Chinese: 刘小枫; born 1956) is a Chinese scholar and a professor at the Renmin University of China. He has been considered the prototypical example of a cultural Christian (Chinese: 文化基督徒; pinyin: wénhuà jīdūtú), a believer who may lack a specific church identification or affiliation, and was, along with He Guanghu, one of the main forerunners of the academic field of Sino-Christian Theology (simplified Chinese: 汉语神学; traditional Chinese: 漢語神學; pinyin: hànyǔ shénxué).

== Biography ==
Liu Xiaofeng was born to a petite bourgeois family in Chongqing, China, in 1956. After graduating from high school, Liu was sent to labor in a nearby village as part of the Down to the Countryside Movement.

He completed his Bachelor of Arts degree in German language and literature at Sichuan International Studies University before beginning his Master of Arts in aesthetics at Peking University in 1982, completing it in 1985. At Peking University, Liu's studies focused on German philosophy.

Liu's earliest academic writing focused on German Romanticism.

He later received a scholarship to study at the University of Basel in Switzerland in April 1989, where he completed his Ph.D. in Christian theology in 1993 on a theological investigation into Max Scheler's phenomenology and critique of modernity. He also undertook an extensive translation effort of historical and contemporary Christian texts. He returned to Hong Kong in 1993 as a research fellow at the Chinese University of Hong Kong. Describing himself as a cultural Christian, Liu advocated Christian ethics as moral instruction for contemporary Chinese society.

By the late 1990s, Liu concluded that his seeking of a Christian transcendence beyond politics risked becoming a secular liberalism. Liu changed his stance and focused on the conservative political theology of Carl Schmitt and Leo Strauss and their exchanges on the theological basis of political authority. On the basis of their work, Liu contended that reasserting a Confucian religion against secular Western enlightenment could guide moral conduct and national politics in China. According to Eske J. Møllgaard, a Norwegian scholar who studies the comparison between Chinese and Western philosophy, Liu developed Leo Strauss's philosophy in a "neo-fascist direction."

In the 2000s, supporters of this position gravitated towards Liu and circles of Chinese Straussians became active in Guangzhou and Beijing. These Chinese Straussians sought to promote classical learning, create elite liberal arts educational institutions, and opposed what they deemed as the harmful influence of Western liberal values in Chinese academia. In 2009, Liu created the Center for Classic Studies at Renmin University.

In 2013, Liu stated that the Confucian roots of the Chinese Communist Revolution should be studied, and that Mao Zedong should be regarded as a "sage-king" and "founding father" of the socialist republic. Liu contended that the "spiritual trauma" of 20th Century China was attributable to the harmful influence of republicanism which diminished spiritual solidarity and led to civil war.

== Writings ==
Liu's work encompasses the disciplines of theology, political philosophy, and aesthetics.

Liu's second published monograph, Salvation and Easiness (1988), called to cast off Sino-Western cultural differences to confront the fundamental question of ultimate values.

Liu's works played an important role in the development of the Sino-Christian theology movement. Liu became well known for his critique of Confucian ethics as inferior to the other-worldly focus of the Judeo-Christian tradition. Liu was widely viewed as one of the most prominent cultural Christians.

Liu's essay Sino-Christian Theology and the Philosophy of History advocated that Chinese Christians should abandon their "obsession with 'indigenization' and 'Sinicization'" to accept the miraculous birth, death, and resurrection of Jesus Christ as a divine revelation which "transcends all national-historical categories". According to this essay, any culturalist trend to illustrate the Christ Event with Chinese examples would collapse the boundary between "the word of God" and "the word of man".

== Reception ==
A modern writer commented, "Liu's writings have had a major impact in China not only on those Chinese who think of themselves as Christian, but on those who are interested in broad analysis of China in the context of the world's current cultural and philosophical era."

However, his interpretation of Strauss and other modern Western thinkers has been criticized as one-sided and even deeply flawed, with critics claiming that his defense of the Chinese Communist Party, and Mao Zedong in particular, does not go well together with Christianity, nor with Classical Western civilization as described by Strauss and his disciples.

Liu is considered to be a member of the Chinese New Left, which some scholars have identified as a conservative movement and in defense of hierarchy in the name of equality.
