= Milton Wai-yiu Wan =

Chinese theological scholar

Milton Wai-yiu Wan (born 1952, Chinese: 溫偉耀) is a scholar of Christian spirituality and Sino-Christian theology and Honorary Senior Research Fellow at the Divinity School of Chung Chi College (DSCCC). He has been Assistant Professor at, Chinese University of Hong Kong (CUHK), Department of Cultural and Religious Studies, CUHK, and the Institute of Sino-Christian Studies.

== Biography ==
Wan was born in 1952 in Hong Kong. He finished his secondary education at Pui Ching Middle School. Between 1970 and 1973, he did his Bachelor of Science in Physics at the CUHK and in 1975, obtained a Master of Philosophy in Quantum Mechanics at the same institution. In 1978, he finished a Master of Arts in Christian studies at the China Graduate School of Theology (CGST). In 1978, together with Rev Dr Jonathan Chao, he established the Chinese Culture Research Center, CGST and founded the journal China and the Church.

In 1980, Wan and his family moved to the UK to pursue a PhD at Oxford University, with a PhD thesis entitled ‘Authentic humanity in the theology of Paul Tillich and Karl Barth’. After obtaining the PhD in 1984, he moved back to Hong Kong. In September 1985, he started studying another PhD at the CUHK about moral cultivation of Cheng Hao (1032-1085) and Cheng Yi’s (1033-1077) philosophy, supervising under neo-Confucian philosopher Lao Sze-kwang (1927-2012) and graduated in 1990.

After the 1989 Tiananmen Square protests and massacre, Wan moved to Canada. In 1998, he moved back to Hong Kong to take up the role as the programme leader of DSCCC's ‘Chinese Culture and Christianity’ course and involved in the development of the Resource Center for Contemporary Christian Studies (RCCCS) to provide training to mainland Chinese scholars in the summer.

Since 1999, he taught at the Department of Cultural and Religious Studies, CUHK and served as Mok Hing-yiu Distinguished Professor at the Institute of Sino-Christian Studies. He continued to research and lecture on Christian studies at the mainland Chinese academia. He has been guest lecturers in various universities, including Renmin University of China, Zhejiang University, Shandong University, and Sichuan University.

Between 1984 and 2016, Wan has taught at the China Graduate School of Theology, Ontario Theological Seminary (now renamed as Tyndale University), and the Divinity School of Chung Chi College, CUHK. He has also been the consultant of Markham Chinese Presbyterian Church, Canada, Richmond Hill Christian Community Church, Canada, and EFCC Spring Church, Hong Kong.

After retired in May 2016, he continued to research on Christian spirituality and Sino-Christian theology.

== Personal life ==
Wan married his first wife Lo Ah-ling, a BA graduate of arts (1972) at the New Asia College, CUHK. His second daughter Wan Hiu-wah was born during his PhD study in the UK and was diagnosed with severe intellectual disability. When he moved back in Hong Kong in 1984, he discovered his wife had terminal cancer and his dad dementia. Both of them died in 1987.

While dealing with the loss of his wife and his father, the 1989 Tiananmen Square protests and massacre made Wan realised there was no hope for China and he decided to migrant to Canada. He married his second wife Yip Lai-fan in Canada. On 11 February 2008, his daughter Hiu-wah died.

== Honours ==
In 1997, he was named as the 10 most influential Chinese by Toronto Life. In 2015, he received teaching award at the DSCCC.
