= Kia Abdullah =

English novelist and travel writer (born 1982)

Kia Abdullah FRSL
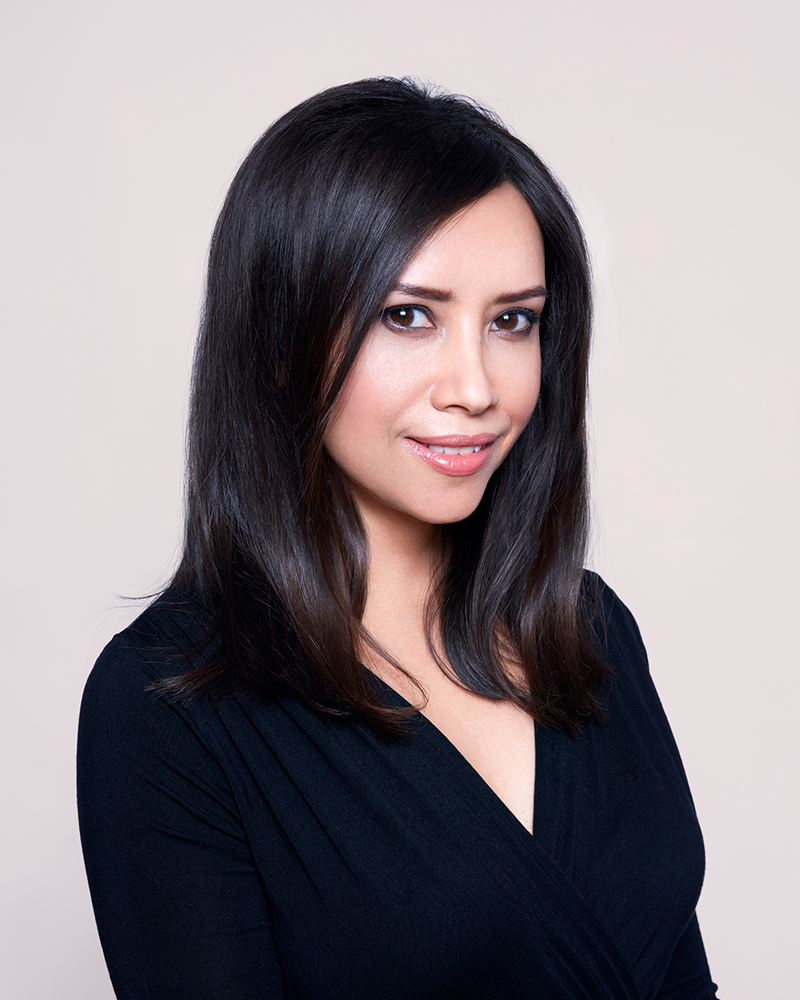
- Abdullah in 2019
- Born: 17 May 1982 (age 44); London, England
- Education: Queen Mary University of London (BSc)
- Occupations: Novelist, writer
- Writing career
- Language: English
- Years active: 2006–present
- Genres: Fiction, crime, thriller
- Notable work: Take It Back
- Website: kiaabdullah.com

Kia Abdullah FRSL (born 17 May 1982) is an English novelist, journalist, and travel writer. She is the best-selling author of courtroom dramas Take It Back (HarperCollins, 2019), Truth Be Told (HarperCollins, 2020), Next of Kin (HarperCollins, 2021) and Those People Next Door (HarperCollins, 2023). She has written for The New York Times, The Guardian, The Times, The Financial Times, The Telegraph and the BBC, among other publications.

== Background ==
Abdullah is of Bangladeshi descent and was born and brought up in the London borough of Tower Hamlets in a family of eight children. Of her childhood, Abdullah has said: "[People] imagine poverty and misery, hardship and hand-me-downs. Of course I forfeited my fair share of material pleasures but a household of noise and colour is far better than possessions and privilege."

== Education ==
Abdullah was educated in England, with secondary schooling at the Central Foundation Girls' School. She graduated from Queen Mary, University of London with a first class in BSc Computer Science. Her final year thesis was titled A Program Slicing Tool for Analysing Java Programs. Abdullah has an IQ of 150. She was a member of Mensa International – a non-profit organization open to people who score at the 98th percentile of IQ – but left within a year of joining.

== Career ==
Abdullah graduated in 2003, after which she worked in tech for three years. In 2007, she quit her job in tech to pursue a career as a writer, taking a 50% pay cut in the process.

From 2008 to 2010, Abdullah wrote about a range of topics, from politics to relationships, for The Guardian. She also worked as Features Editor at Asian Woman magazine, during which time she interviewed a range of prominent Asian actors and musicians including Riz Ahmed, Meera Syal, Nitin Sawhney, Jay Sean and Anoushka Shankar.

Abdullah was an occasional guest on BBC Asian Network's DJ Nihal show and spoke about a range of subjects, from drug abuse and gender inequality to dealing with culture and identity as a British-Asian writer. In 2009, she was nominated for a Muslim Writers Award. In 2011, she was involved in a Twitter controversy after commenting on the deaths of three British tourists.

In 2012, Abdullah joined global publisher Penguin Random House where she worked on travel brand Rough Guides. In 2014, Abdullah quit her job to found Atlas & Boots, an outdoor travel blog read by 150,000 people a month. Abdullah has contributed to Lonely Planet and Rough Guides and has spoken about her travels on television, radio, print and online.

In 2019, Abdullah's mainstream debut crime novel, Take It Back, was published by HarperCollins. It was chosen by The Guardian, The Telegraph and The Sunday Times newspapers as one of the best new crime and thriller novels.

In 2020, Abdullah's second novel, Truth Be Told, was published by HarperCollins and consequently short-listed for a Diverse Book Award. In July that year, Abdullah founded Asian Booklist, a website to help readers discover new books by British-Asian authors.

In 2021, Abdullah's third novel, Next of Kin, was published by HarperCollins. It was named The Times Book of the Month, was long-listed for the CWA Gold Dagger and won the Diverse Book Award for Adult Fiction.

In 2023, Abdullah's fourth novel, Those People Next Door, was published by HarperCollins. It was the Times Book of the Month, a Guardian best new thriller, the Waterstones Thriller of the Month and a Times Bestseller, spending five weeks in the chart.

She was elected a Fellow of the Royal Society of Literature (FRSL) in 2025.

== Personal life ==
Abdullah was born and brought up as Muslim. In 2020, she stated that she identifies as an agnostic and a cultural Muslim.

Abdullah speaks three languages: English, Sylheti and Spanish.

== Bibliography ==
Novels

- 2006: Life, Love and Assimilation ISBN 978-1897312001
- 2009: Child's Play ISBN 978-0955807855
- 2019: Take It Back ISBN 978-0008314675
- 2020: Truth Be Told ASIN B0842DLV8Y
- 2020: Take It Back ISBN 978-1250273017
- 2021: Next of Kin ASIN B08VS5N4NZ
- 2023: Those People Next Door ASIN B0CNVN43RF
- 2023: Perfectly Nice Neighbors ASIN B0BQG1ZTGX
- 2025: What Happens in the Dark ASIN B0DNLSB5RT

Guide

- 2016: Don't Offer Papaya: 101 Tips for Your First Time Around the World ASIN B01M02XD87
