= Sino-Christian theology =

Movement in mainland China and Hong Kong

Sino-Christian theology (Note: simplified Chinese: 汉语神学; traditional Chinese: 漢語神學; pinyin: hànyǔ shénxué or simplified Chinese: 汉语基督教神学; traditional Chinese: 漢語基督教神學; pinyin: hànyǔ jīdūjiào shénxué, literally meaning "Christian theology in the Chinese language") is a theological movement in Mainland China and Hong Kong. There are two generally recognized senses of the term. In the broad sense, it belongs to the tradition of indigenous theology which stretches as early as the works during the time of the Jesuit China missions, until the present day. However, these indigenizing efforts are often critiqued for a lacking in their assessments of traditional Chinese culture, particularly as found in Confucianism. In the narrow sense of the term, Sino-Christian theology is associated with cultural Christians like Liu Xiaofeng and He Guanghu who have challenged the indigenizing approach and have proposed the greater need to articulate a critically reflective theology using the Chinese language.

In recent years, it has been observed that there has perhaps been the growth of a younger generation of scholars in Sino-Christian theology. While the earlier generation included cultural Christians (Note: Chinese: 文化基督徒; pinyin: wénhuà jīdūtú) who often used methodologies within the humanities and social sciences, the younger generation includes individuals who identify themselves as "Christian scholars" (Note: simplified Chinese: 基督教学人; traditional Chinese: 基督教學人; pinyin: jīdūtú xuérén) with a greater commitment to the Christian faith and believe the use of the human sciences is inadequate for articulating Christian theology. Many have become elders and pastors in urban churches, and often gravitated towards Calvinism as a means to offer a public theology for the Chinese Christian church.

Generally, the Sino-Christian theology movement promotes a contextual-historicist approach to Christianity in China.

== Theological themes ==
Much of the writings within this field have looked at Christian theology as a means to engage China, in its pursuit for modernity. Often, this has focused on comparing Western culture, shaped by Christianity, with Chinese culture, shaped by Confucianism and Daoism.

One area of discussion has been around the Christian doctrine of sin. Liu Xiaofeng and Zhuo Xinping, for instance, have described China as having a "culture of joy" whereas the West has a "culture of sin". (Note: See also: Guilt–shame–fear spectrum of cultures) In a post-Cultural Revolution context, they explain how the doctrine of original sin is useful in explaining the social ills that exist in contemporary Chinese society.

Another area is with regard to morality. Whereas Confucianism is often understood as fundamentally a system of ethics, some have written about how the Christian understanding of morality has been shaped by the two commands of loving God and loving neighbor.

== See also ==
- Chinese names for the God of Abrahamic religions
- Chinese theology
- Chinese Rites controversy
- Political theology in China
- Centre for Sino-Christian Studies
- Milton Wai-yiu Wan
