= Nominal Christian =

Description of a specific type of Christian

The evangelical Lausanne Movement defines a nominal Christian as "a person who has not responded in repentance and faith to Jesus Christ as his personal Saviour and Lord"...[he] "may be a practising or non-practising church member. He may give intellectual assent to basic Christian doctrines and claim to be a Christian. He may be faithful in attending liturgical rites and worship services, and be an active member involved in church affairs." American Reformed theologian Douglas Wilson disagrees with the category of "nominal Christian" and argues that all who are baptized enter into a covenant with God, and are obliged to serve him; there is, therefore, "no such thing as a merely nominal Christian any more than we can find a man who is a nominal husband." There are, however, "wicked and faithless Christians."

According to data from the European Social Survey in 2012 show that around a third of European Christians say they attend services once a month or more. More than two-thirds of Latin American Christians and 90% of African Christians said they attended church regularly. Missionaries Patrick Johnstone and Jason Mandryk, estimate that 1.2 billion people are "nominal and non-practicing 'Christians'." According to a 2018 study by the Pew Research Center, Christians in Africa, Asia, Latin America and the United States have high levels of commitment to their faith.

The Pew Research Center studied the effects of gender on religiosity throughout the world, finding that women are generally more religious than men. Pew Research Center data in 53 countries, found that 53% of Christian women and 46% of Christian men say they attend services at least once a week. On the other hand, Christians of both genders in African countries are equally likely to regularly attend services.

== Sunday Christian ==
A Sunday Christian or Sunday morning Christian (also once-a-weeker) is a derisive term used to refer to someone who typically attends Christian church services on Sundays, but is presumed or witnessed not to adhere to the doctrines or rules of the religion (either actively or passively), or refuses to register as a church member. These members are sometimes considered to be hypocritical in how or what they practice due in part to their confusion or cherry-picking how they live their religion.

== Cafeteria Christianity ==
=== Usage ===
The ancestor term, "cafeteria Catholicism", was coined by E. Michael Jones's Fidelity Magazine in 1986. The first use of Cafeteria Christianity in print has been dated to the magazine, The Month, in 1992.

Another early use was by Richard Holloway in an interview in Third Way in September 2001.

You get cafeteria Christianity, a kind of shopping for ideas you approve of. They turned out to be right for the wrong reasons, because I think that once you admit that there are in scripture large sections that by our standards are not just inappropriate but scarcely moral – such as the justification of slavery...

Since the cafeteria Christian may be someone who wants "to reject the parts of scripture they find objectionable and embrace only the parts they like", the term can be used ad hominem, either to disqualify a person's omission of a Christian precept, or to invalidate their advocacy of a different precept entirely.

Equated with "Christianity Lite", it is sometimes used to deride the mass-appeal subculture of megachurches.

"Cafeteria Christianity" is a derogatory term to accuse other Christian individuals or denominations of selecting which Christian doctrines they will follow, and which they will not.

The related term "cafeteria Catholicism" is a pejorative term applied to Catholics who dissent from Roman Catholic moral teaching on issues such as abortion, birth control, premarital sex, masturbation or homosexuality. The term is less frequently applied to those who dissent from other Catholic moral teaching on issues such as social justice, capital punishment, or just war.

=== Interpretation ===
Cafeteria-style means picking and choosing, as if "sliding our food tray along a cafeteria's counter". The term implies that an individual's professed religious belief is actually a proxy for their personal opinions rather than an acceptance of Christian doctrine. The selectivity implied may relate to the acceptance of Christian doctrines, or attitudes to moral and ethical issues (for example abortion, homosexuality, racism or idolatry) and the applicability of Old Testament laws to Christians.

As the Christian version of "cherry-picking theology", it is seen as a result of postmodern reading of texts, where the reader goes beyond analysis of what requires interpretation, adopting an approach where "anything goes".

In The Marketplace of Christianity, economists Robert Ekelund, Robert Hébert and Robert Tollison equate Cafeteria Christianity with self-generated Christianity, i.e. the religion of many Christians which "matches their demand profile" and "may be Christian or based in other areas of thought". They conclude that "Christian religious individualists have existed in all times."

== See also ==
- Adiaphora
- Apatheism
- Backsliding
- Biblical law in Christianity
- Christian atheism
- Christian agnosticism
- Christian deism
- Christianity and homosexuality
- Christian views on the Old Covenant
- Cultural Christian
- Cultural Mormon
- Double belonging
- Dual-covenant theology
- Hermeneutics
- Humanistic Judaism
- Lapsed Catholic
- Legalism (theology)
- Moralistic therapeutic deism
- New Covenant
- New Wine into Old Wineskins
- No true Scotsman
- Non-denominational Christianity
- Postchristianity
- Red-Letter Christian
- Rice Christian
- Sabbath in Christianity
- Sunday Christian
- Supersessionism
