= Christian values =

Ethics derived from Jesus Christ's ministry

Christian values historically refer to values derived from the teachings of Jesus Christ. The term has various applications and meanings, and specific definitions can vary widely between denominations, geographical locations, historical contexts, and different schools of thought. Christian values also relate to the Christian identity in identity politics.

== Values ==
Contemporary Christian values are based on the teachings of Jesus in the Bible, including love, compassion, empathy, integrity, and justice. They guide how Christians live their lives and interact with others.

Some core Christian values include:

- Love as the central ethical command
- Compassion: A core value of Christianity
- Humility: A core value of Christianity
- Integrity: A core value of Christianity
- Justice: A core value of Christianity

Some of the beliefs of modern-progressive Protestant Christianity include:

- Welcoming all to be involved regardless of gender, sexual orientation, race, tradition, etc.;
- Recognizing that others follow their own paths to God;
- Striving to protect and restore the integrity of the Earth;
- Aiming for peace and justice among all people;
- Affirming that the teachings of Jesus offer one of many ways to experience the sacredness of life.

=== Use in global politics ===
In the 21st-century United States, Australia, United Kingdom, and other countries, Christian values and family values are often cited by the Christian right and conservative political parties in describing their respective political stances:

Christian right and conservative parties interpretations of Christian values may include:

- Censorship of sexual content, especially in films and on television.
- Sexual abstinence outside marriage and abstinence-only sex education.
- The promotion of intelligent design to be taught in public schools and colleges as an alternative to evolution.
- The desirability of laws against same-sex marriage.
- Support for laws against the acceptance of homosexuality into mainstream society.
- The desirability of organized school prayer in public schools.
- Redefining 'toxic' empathy for others as a gateway to sin.

== See also ==
- Biblical law in Christianity
- Christian ethics
- Family values
- Fruit of the spirit – Biblical term
- Jesusism
- Judeo-Christian values
- Red-Letter Christians
- Morality and religion
