= He Guanghu =

Chinese philosopher and theologian

He Guanghu (born 1950; Chinese: 何光沪) is a Chinese scholar of philosophy of religion and Christian theology. He is considered one of the leading "cultural Christians" in China, i.e. the intellectuals who see Christian culture as a key to rebuilding Chinese civilization.

== Biography ==
Born in Guiyang, he was sent to the countryside to work during the Cultural Revolution. After the resumption of tertiary education in China in the late 1970s, he pursued studies in religion, completing a PhD in 1989 from the Institute of World Religions, Chinese Academy of Social Sciences. He was a researcher at the Institute of World Religions from 1989 to 2001, and was a Professor of Religious Studies in the School of Philosophy at Renmin University of China from 2001 until his retirement.

He is considered one of the leading "cultural Christians" in China. He has argued for Christianity's significance in the religious pluralism of China, and for the importance of Christian theology articulated in one's mother tongue.

He signed the human rights manifesto Charter 08 and the Oxford Consensus 2013.
