= Recovering Catholic =

Term used by some former Catholics

The term recovering Catholic is used by some former practicing Catholics to describe their religious status. The use of the term implies that the person considers their former Catholicism to have been a negative influence on their life, one to be "recovered" from. The term first came into use in the 1980s.

The term is sometimes used with humorous intent, with a conscious parallel being drawn to the 12-step recovery programs often used by those recovering from addictions, although practicing Catholics often find the term offensive.

== See also ==
- Apostasy in Christianity
- Cafeteria Catholicism
- Catholic guilt
- Glossary of the Catholic Church
- Index of Catholic Church articles
- Lapsed Catholic
- List of former Roman Catholics
