= Lapsed Catholic =

Catholic person who is non-practicing

A lapsed Catholic is a Catholic who is non-practicing. Such a person may still identify as a Catholic, and remains one according to Catholic canon law.

== Interpretations ==
The Merriam-Webster Dictionary's definition of "lapsed" in relation to "lapsed Catholic" is "no longer believing or following the teachings of a religion". The Oxford American Writer's Thesaurus associates "lapsed Catholic" as one who is backsliding. Lapsing is thus not necessarily connected with a lack of belief, and other sources also associate the term with abandonment of the practice of the Catholic religion rather than with rejection of its doctrine. Thus the Cambridge Advanced Learner's Dictionary defines "lapsed", again in relation to "lapsed Catholic", as "no longer involved in an activity or organization", and the Oxford Dictionary speaks only of "no longer following the rules and practices of a religion or doctrine".

However, author Daniel Ford links being a lapsed Catholic with rejection of Catholic teaching, either totally or by being an "à la carte Catholic".

Richard John Neuhaus distinguished between Catholic and Protestant ideas of what it means to be "lapsed" by quoting G. K. Chesterton, who remarked that a Protestant typically says he is a good Protestant, while a Catholic typically says he is a bad Catholic. For many, being a lapsed Catholic is just another way of being a Catholic.

== Catholic teaching on membership in the church ==
According to Catholic belief, baptism "seals the Christian with the indelible spiritual mark of belonging to Christ. No sin can erase this mark, even if sin prevents baptism from bearing the fruits of salvation."

Even the form of censure known as excommunication does not erase this sacramental character of baptism; but excommunicated persons are "cut off from the Church", barred from receiving the Eucharist and all other sacraments, and from taking an active part in the liturgy (reading, serving at the altar, etc.).

== History ==
In the time of the persecution of Christians in the Roman Empire, many Christians, including clergy and even some bishops, were referred to as the lapsi (those who had slipped and fallen) as opposed to the stantes (those who stood firm). Different attitudes developed within the Church towards the lapsed: some held they should never be readmitted to the Church before death, others were for demanding serious penance of them before readmitting them, while others again were still more lenient. The First Council of Nicaea insisted that any clergy who had lapsed were not to be readmitted to clerical rank.

From 1983, a formal act of defection from the Catholic Church was recognised in the 1983 Code of Canon Law, making defectors ineligible for the privileges of membership of the church, such as marrying in church. This form of defection was removed from the Code in 2009.

In the religion question on the Republic of Ireland census, "lapsed (Roman) Catholic" (a write-in option rather than a pre-printed checkbox option) was collated separately for the first time in 2011, when 1,268 were recorded (0.033% of the "Roman Catholic" total); the 2016 census recorded 8,094 (0.21%).

== Present canon law ==
Today, a Latin Catholic who lapses to the extent of becoming an apostate, a heretic or a schismatic is automatically excommunicated; and, until the excommunication is lifted, is forbidden to have any ministerial part in the celebration of Mass or other worship ceremonies, to celebrate or receive the sacraments or to exercise any church functions. This is an obligation that binds the excommunicated person. Unless the excommunication has been publicly declared by the church and not merely incurred automatically, the excommunicated person cannot on that ground alone be publicly refused the sacraments, even by a priest who knows of it. However, to assist at the marriage of someone who has "notoriously" (i.e. widely known to have done so) rejected the Catholic faith, a priest needs the permission of the ordinary and the same promises required by spouses in mixed marriages are also required.

The 1983 Code of Canon Law lays down no particular penalty for a lapse in one's religious duties as a Catholic that consist in failure to attend Sunday Mass and failure to receive Communion during Eastertide other than a recommendation toward penance and reconciliation.

None of this prevents an individual who was baptised a Catholic from completely ignoring the Catholic Church's laws or ideas and not disclosing their personal views or beliefs. As a consequence, the lapsing of a person to become an apostate is neither obvious nor can it follow that they are automatically excommunicated. In a sense it highlights the dichotomy of religious law which may be completely disregarded without effective penalty (whether that would be justified or not).

== Colloquial names ==
Some lapsed Catholics attend Mass on special occasions like Christmas and Easter. Such lapsed Catholics are colloquially and sometimes derogatorily called Cultural Catholics, CEO Catholics, Chreaster Catholics ("Christmas and Easter Only") or A&P Catholics (for Ash Wednesday and Palm Sunday).

== See also ==
- Apostasy in Christianity
- Catholic agnosticism
- Catholic Atheism
- Catholic guilt
- Spiritual but not religious
- Lapsi (Christianity)
- List of former Roman Catholics
- Recovering Catholic
- Sunday Christian
- Moralistic therapeutic deism
