= Cultural Christians =

People who appreciate Christianity primarily because of its cultural legacy

Cultural Christians are those who received Christian values or appreciate Christian culture but do not subscribe to Christian religious beliefs and practices. They may be agnostics, apatheists, atheists, deists, non-practicing Christians, non-theists, pantheists, or transtheists. These individuals may identify as culturally Christian because of family background, personal experiences, or the social and cultural environment in which they grew up.

Contrasting terms are "practicing Christian", "biblical Christian", "committed Christian", or "faithful Christian". The term "cultural Christian" may be specified further by Christian denomination, e.g. "cultural Catholic", "cultural Lutheran", and "cultural Anglican".

== Usage ==
=== Belarus ===
Alexander Lukashenko, the President of Belarus, has identified as cultural Christian, calling himself an "Orthodox atheist" in one of his interviews.

=== France ===
French Deists of the 18th and early 19th centuries include Napoleon. In the 21st century, Emmanuel Macron, the President of France, identified himself as an "Agnostic Catholic".

=== China ===
Traditionally, Christianity has been considered a "foreign religion" (Chinese: 洋教; pinyin: yáng jiào, means non-local religions) in China, including all the negative connotations of foreignness common in China. This attitude only started to change at the end of the 20th century. Since the Republican era, a trend among Chinese theologians has been to indigenise the divinity of Jesus Christ by bringing Biblical teachings in line with the Confucian tradition.

In China, the term "Cultural Christians" (Chinese: 文化基督徒; pinyin: wénhuà jīdūtú) refers to Chinese intellectuals devoted to the study of Christian theology, ethics, and literature, and often contribute to a movement known as Sino-Christian theology. Some of the earliest figures in this movement in the late-1980s and 1990s, such as Liu Xiaofeng and He Guanghu, were sympathetic to Christianity but chose not to associate with any local church. Since the 1990s, a newer generation of these Cultural Christians have been more willing to associate with local churches, and have often drawn on Calvinist theology.

=== Italy ===
The liberal writer Benedetto Croce, in his book Perché non possiamo non dirci cristiani ('Why we can't not call ourselves Christians'), expressed the view that Roman Catholic traditions and values formed the basic culture of all Italians, believers and non-believers, and described Christianity primarily as a cultural revolution.

=== United Kingdom ===
Outspoken English atheist Richard Dawkins has described himself in several interviews as a "cultural Christian" and a "cultural Anglican". In his book The God Delusion, he calls Jesus Christ praiseworthy for his ethics. Liz Truss, shortly before becoming prime minister, said "I share the values of the Christian faith and the Church of England, but I'm not a regular practising religious person."

=== United States ===
Thomas Jefferson, a Founding Father of the United States, considered himself part of Christian culture, despite his doubts about the divinity of Jesus.

== Demographics ==
=== Western Europe ===
Most European countries have a Christian cultural background, which was significant in inheriting European civilization, and Europe also came, in some contexts, to be seen as synonymous with "Christendom" (though properly speaking the term refers to the Christian world in its entirety). Today, many people in Western Europe remain "culturally Christian". According to a 2018 study by the Pew Research Center; Christianity is still the largest religion in Western Europe, where 71% of Western Europeans identified themselves as Christian. According to Pew Research Center "most Christians in Western Europe today are non-practicing, but Christian identity still remains a meaningful religious, social and cultural marker", where 55% of Western Europeans identified themselves as non-practicing Christians, and 18% identified themselves as church-attending Christians.

==== The Netherlands ====
Forms of Christianity have dominated religious life in what is now the Netherlands for more than 1,200 years, and by the middle of the sixteenth century the country was strongly Protestant (Calvinist). The population of the Netherlands was predominantly Christian until the late 20th century, divided into a number of denominations. The provinces North Brabant and Limburg in the Netherlands are historically mostly Roman Catholic, therefore many of their people still use the term and some traditions as a base for their cultural identity rather than as a religious identity. Since the War of Independence the Catholics were systematically and officially discriminated against by the Protestant government until the second half of the 20th century, which had a major influence on the economic and cultural development of the southern part of the Netherlands.

From the Reformation to the 20th century, Dutch Catholics were largely confined to certain southern areas in the Netherlands, and they still tend to form a majority or large minority of the population in the southern provinces of the Netherlands, North Brabant and Limburg; however, with modern population shifts and increasing secularization, these areas tend to have fewer and fewer religious Catholics. Since 1960 the emphasis on many Catholic concepts including hell, the devil, sinning and Catholic traditions like confession, kneeling, the teaching of catechism and having the host placed on the tongue by the priest rapidly disappeared, and these concepts are nowadays seldom or not at all found in modern Dutch Catholicism. The southern area still has original Catholic traditions including Carnival, pilgrimages, rituals like lighting candles for special occasions and field chapels and crucifixes in the landscape, giving the southern part of the Netherlands a distinctive Catholic atmosphere, with which the population identifies in contrast to the rest of the Netherlands. The vast majority of the (self-identifying) Catholic population in the Netherlands is now largely irreligious in practice. Research among Catholics in the Netherlands in 2007 shows that even among religious Dutch Catholics only 27% can be regarded as theist, 55% as ietsist, 17% as agnostic and 1% as atheist.

== See also ==
- Apatheism
- Backsliding
- Cafeteria Christianity
- Christian atheism
- Christian agnosticism
- Christian culture
- Christian deism
- Christian Identity
- Christian value
- Jewish secularism
- Cultural Mormon
- Cultural Muslim
- Lapsed Catholic
- Nominal Christian
- Jewish atheism
- Rice Christian
- Sunday Christian
- Moralistic therapeutic deism
