= Causalism =

Causalism holds behavior and actions to be the result of previous mental states, such as beliefs, desires, or intentions, rather than from a present conscious will guiding one's actions.

One of the foremost proponents for this view was Donald Davidson (philosopher), who believed "that reasons explain actions just inasmuch as they are the causes of those actions". His views were mainly set out in his famous paper ‘Actions, Reasons and Causes’ (1963).

Causalism is in accord with how most people have traditionally explained their actions, but critics point out that certain habitual actions such as scratching an itch are only noticed during or after the fact, if at all, making the causalist explanation that such behaviors have a mental antecedent that isn’t recalled seem ad hoc.
