= Jesuism =

Religious belief

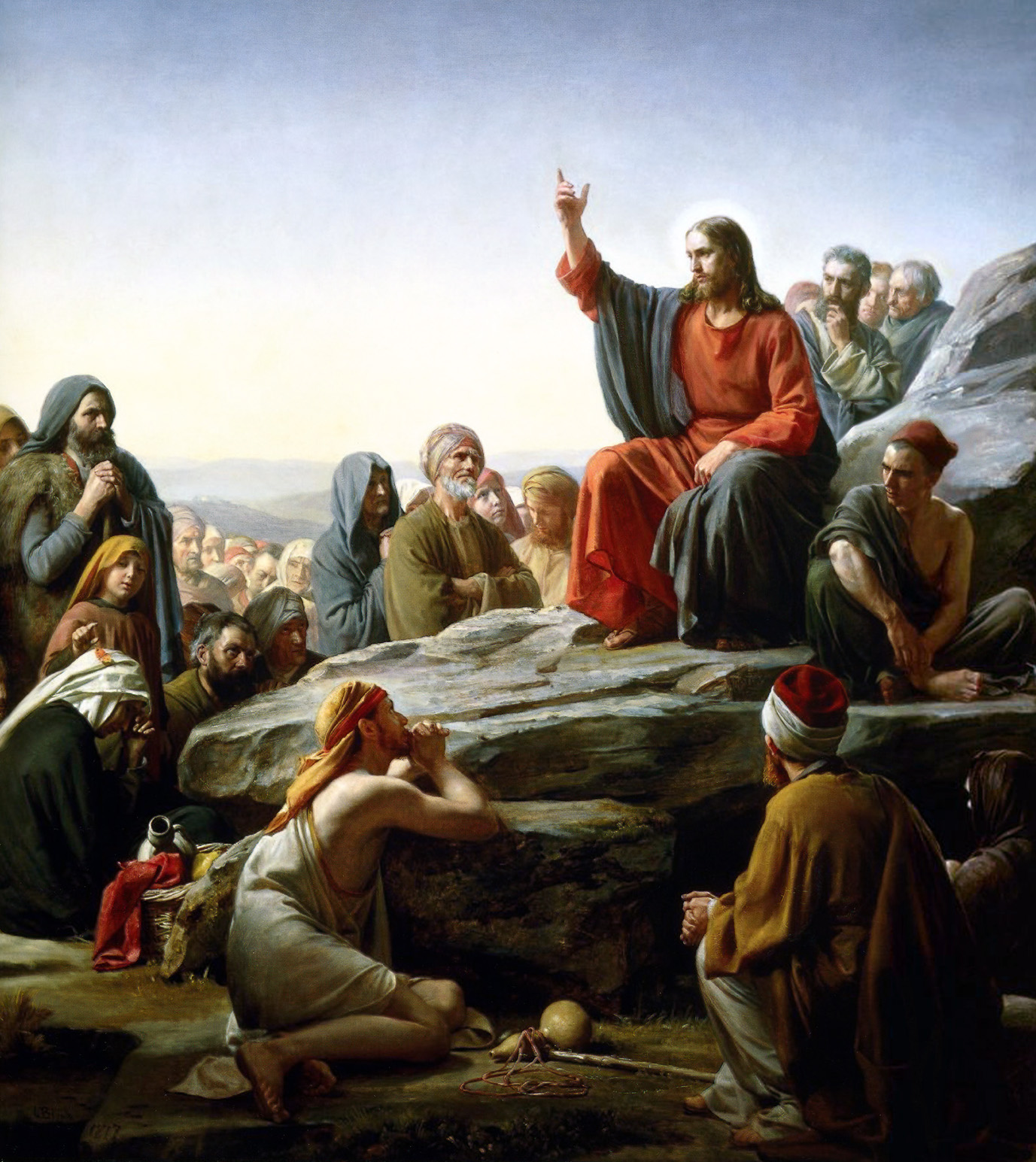
Jesus's Sermon on the Mount (Carl Bloch's rendition pictured) is central to the philosophy of Jesuism.

Jesuism (also spelled Jesusism and Jesuanism) is a belief system considering itself to be the true representation of the teachings of Jesus and contrasts itself from the teachings of mainstream Christianity. In particular, the term is often contrasted with Pauline Christianity and the mainstream church dogma of Nicene Christianity. Adherents of the belief system may be termed Jesuists (also spelled Jesusists or Jesuans).

== Etymology ==
The term Jesuism was coined in the late 19th century. It is derived from Jesus (Jesus of Nazareth) + -ism (English suffix, a characteristic or system of beliefs, from French -isme, Latin -ismus, Greek -ismos).

== History of usage ==
In 1878, freethinker and former Shaker D. M. Bennett wrote that "Jesuism", as distinct from "Paulism", was the gospel taught by Peter, John and James, and the messianic doctrine of a new Jewish sect. In 1894, American pathologist and atheist Frank Seaver Billings defined "Jesusism" as the "Christianity of the Gospels" and a philosophy which "can be attributed directly to the teachings of Jesus the Nazarene". In 1909, the Seventh-day Adventist newspaper Signs of the Times, released an issue titled "Modern Christianity Not Jesusism", wherein the question is posed: "Christianity of today is not the old original Christianity. It is not Jesusism, for it is not the religion which Jesus preached. Is it not time to make Christianity the religion which He personally preached and which He personally practiced?" Harvard theologian Bouck White, in 1911, also defined "Jesusism" as "the religion which Jesus preached". Lord Ernest Hamilton in 1912 wrote that "Jesuism" was simply to love one another and love God. The philosophy of Jesusism was described in the book The Naked Truth of Jesusism from Oriental Manuscripts, penned by theologian Lyman Fairbanks George in 1914, as follows:

It is to restore Jesus's sayings to their original purity.
It is to eradicate from the Gospels the interpolations of the Middle Ages.
It is to relate the misconceptions revealed by recent archaeological research.
It is to present Jesus from an economic viewpoint.
It is to break through the spell spectral of Cosmic Credulity.
It is to toll the knell of schism through Jesusism.

The Orthodox theologian Sergei Bulgakov further noted in 1935 that "the concentration of piety on the Christ alone has become a deviation already known by a special term as Jesusism". Influential Catholic theologian Karl Rahner referred to "Jesusism" as a focus on the life of Jesus and attempts to imitate his life, as opposed to a focus on God or the Christian Church. University of Melbourne professor Lindsay Falvey noted in 2009 that "the gospel story so differs from Church doctrine that it could well be of a different religion – Jesusism". Jesusism became the subject of increased academic discussion following its reference by Duke University neurobiologist and philosopher Owen Flanagan in his 2007 book The Really Hard Problem: Meaning in a Material World. Flanagan defines Jesusism as the "message" of Jesus and notes that he "call[s] it 'Jesusism' because most Christian Churches do not endorse Jesus's message truthfully". Flanagan characterized Jesuism as a naturalistic and rationalist philosophy, rejecting the conflict between faith and science. Rodney Stenning Edgecombe, a professor at the University of Cape Town, in a 2009 essay titled Commutation Across the Social Divide remarks how Christianity shifted away from Jesuism; the moral tenets Jesus preached. The terms Jesuism, Jesusism and Jesuanism are also referenced popularly on religious blogs and internet groups.

== Beliefs, practices, and adherents ==
There is no definitive meaning of Jesuism and hence no clear ideology. Various groups use the terms Jesuism, Jesusism and Jesuanism. These include disenchanted Christians who are critical of institutional religion or Pauline Christianity, people who focus solely on the teachings of Jesus and not on the entire Bible, people who identify themselves as disciples of Jesus rather than Christians, and Christian atheists who accept some of Jesus's teachings but do not believe in God. Adherents may be termed Jesuists, Jesusists or Jesuans.

== See also ==
- Bibliolatry
- Christian agnosticism
- Christian atheism
- Christian deism
- Historical Jesus
- Jefferson Bible
- Jesus movement
- Jesus Seminar
- Jewish Christian
- Ministry of Jesus
- New Monasticism
- New religious movements
- Red-Letter Christians
- Sermon on the Mount
- The Aquarian Gospel of Jesus the Christ
- Tolstoyan movement
