= Sohail Ahmed (activist) =

British LGBT rights activist and former Islamist

- Born: 10 February 1992 (age 34)
- Citizenship: British
- Education: Open University
- Occupations: Counter-terrorism and counter-extremism specialist
- Known for: Former Muslim extremist, turned LGBT rights activist

Sohail Ahmed (born 10 February 1992) is an English social activist, former Islamist and Muslim extremist. Following his coming out as a gay man, he now works in the fields of counter-extremism, counter-terrorism, and social integration. He has been featured in the media and has written for a number of publications exploring his personal journey, LGBT rights in the Muslim world, and Islamic extremism. While he was a physics student at Queen Mary University in 2015, he said he had witnessed extremism and jihadism at the university.

== Background ==
Ahmed is a British citizen of Pakistani Mirpuri descent. His parents settled in London following the main wave of immigration from Mirpur, in what is now Azad Kashmir, Pakistan. Ahmed grew up in East London. Originally coming from a Barelvi Muslim background, his parents later became radicalized and started believing in the Salafist form of Islam after befriending Wahhabi neighbours.

== Radicalization ==
Ahmed became radicalized in response to the Iraq and Afghanistan military interventions by the United States and the United Kingdom. He was taught at his local mosque that the Iraq and Afghanistan interventions were representative of a war against Islam and Muslims. Consequently, he began considering carrying out an Islamic terrorist attack in his home city of London.

Ahmed said that his struggle with homosexuality also had a significant impact on his journey towards Islamic extremism. In an attempt to change his sexuality, he became even more religious and observant, and given that he was a Salafist, this, in practice, resulted in him becoming ever more extreme in his views.

Ahmed said that whilst he was an Islamist, he was involved in propagating his radical views at Sir George Monoux College. He also said that he had radicalized a fellow British Muslim who later went on to join the jihad with the now defunct Islamic State in Syria.

== Deradicalization ==
Ahmed ultimately decided not to engage in violence. He then began to doubt his religious beliefs, which mainly centred around questioning the anti-scientific views he was raised with, in particular regarding the rejection of biological evolution. This culminated in him studying evolution, which in turn led to him abandoning his Salafist views.

He then later questioned the concept of revelation and religion, which resulted in him becoming a Deist. He then began questioning the existence of God and became an agnostic. He now describes himself as a cultural Muslim, retaining a connection to his religion, whilst simultaneously rejecting some of its claims.

== Activism and current work ==
Ahmed has campaigned for LGBT rights in the Muslim world, and against Islamic extremism. He is also an active Labour party member. As of 2021, he was working in the fields of counter-terrorism and counter-extremism, and was an intern at the Henry Jackson Society.
