= Freethinking Atheist and Agnostic Kinship =

High school club in Orange County, California, US

- Founded: 2007
- Type: Service club
- Purpose: Break Stereotypes, Fight Discrimination
- Headquarters: Orange County, California
- Region served: California
- Method: Activism, Community Service

The Freethinking Atheist and Agnostic Kinship or FAAK is a Capistrano Valley High School club. The club, created in 2007, has stirred controversy within the Orange County, California, community.

== Purpose ==
Surveys show that atheists, agnostics and freethinkers are the least trusted group of people. The primary purpose of Freethinking Atheist and Agnostic Kinship is to improve this image through activism and community service.

== Media attention ==
The Freethinking Atheist and Agnostic Kinship has been featured in the Orange County Weekly, Orange County Register and national TV's The O'Reilly Factor. In addition, the club has organized several rallies each drawing over 200 picketers. These rallies have landed on the front pages of Orange County Register and Los Angeles Times.

== Accomplishments ==
FAAK has brought a local college professor to Capistrano Valley High School.

FAAK was named Club of the Year in 2007-2008 for its activism and excellence in community service.
