= Christian agnosticism =

Theological position about christianity and agnosticism

Christian agnosticism, or agnostic Christianity, is a theological perspective that blends core elements of Christianity with an agnostic outlook on religious certainty. Christian agnostics generally believe in the existence of God or a higher power and affirm the divinity or spiritual significance of Jesus Christ. However, they tend to reject the notion of biblical infallibility and express uncertainty about whether Christianity is the one true or fully correct religion or path. While they are drawn to Christian teachings and often identify with Christianity, they acknowledge the limits of human knowledge in matters of divine revelation. This belief system has roots in the early days of the Church.

== History ==
=== Leslie Weatherhead ===
In 1965 Christian theologian Leslie Weatherhead published The Christian Agnostic, in which he argues:

... many professing agnostics are nearer belief in the true God than are many conventional church-goers who believe in a body that does not exist whom they miscall God.

Although radical and unpalatable to conventional theologians, Weatherhead's agnosticism falls far short of Huxley's, and short even of weak agnosticism:

Of course, the human soul will always have the power to reject God, for choice is essential to its nature, but I cannot believe that anyone will finally do this.

In the summary chapter of The Christian Agnostic, Weatherhead stated what he believed in a sort of twelve-part creed:

1. God: Weatherhead believed in God, whom he felt most comfortable referring to as "Father". Like most Christians, he felt that the Creator was higher on a scale of values, but that God must also be personal enough to interact in a direct relationship with people.
2. Christ: Weatherhead believed in the divinity of Jesus, in that he stood in a special relationship with God and "indeed an incarnation of God in a fuller sense than any other known Being." Weatherhead argued that the New Testament never refers to Jesus as God, and neither did Jesus refer to himself in this way, instead calling himself the Son of Man and the Word. To say that Jesus was the "only begotten son" of God would be an impossibility to Weatherhead, as such information was not available. The virgin birth of Jesus was not an issue for Weatherhead, having (in his view) never been a major tenet for being a follower of Christ. Moreover, the New Testament traces Jesus' lineage through his father Joseph, not Mary, to show that he descended from the house of David. Weatherhead did not believe Jesus to be sinless, as evidenced by the fact that Jesus got angry, cursed a fig tree because it did not produce fruit and rebuked Peter, one of his closest disciples, calling him Satan. Since Jesus was morally superior, many theologians assume him to be sinless, though Jesus never made that claim for himself. Weatherhead apparently agreed with Nathaniel Mickelm, whom he quoted regarding the blood sacrifice of Jesus as something that was unnecessary for forgiveness. For Mickelm (and subsequently for Weatherhead), it would be a perversion of God to suppose that "God did not and could not forgive sins apart from the death of Christ." Yet that sacrifice revealed something of the nature of God that made one want to be forgiven.
3. Holy Spirit: Weatherhead conceded agnosticism when regarding the Holy Spirit, stating that "Few Christians, whom I know, think of the Holy Spirit as a separate Person". His view was that this would equate to worshiping two gods instead of one.
4. Church: Weatherhead's view of the church was an idealistic one. The church on earth should be a photocopy of the divine original, in which all who loved Christ would be joined together to "worship and move forward to the unimaginable unity with God which is his will."
5. Bible: Weatherhead believed the Bible to be an amazing and often inspired collection of works that progressively revealed man's search for and understanding of God, culminated in the best representation of God's true nature in Jesus Christ. He was, however, critical of many passages, including some from Leviticus, Numbers, and Deuteronomy, because they went against the nature of what Jesus taught, stating that "some of the passages of Browning are of far superior spiritual value." Weatherhead insisted that one must reject anything in the Bible that did not coincide with the gospel of Christ, that is, anything that did not harmonise with the spirit of "love, liberty, gaiety, forgiveness, joy and acceptance."
6. Providence: Webster's defines this as "God conceived as the power sustaining and guiding human destiny". Weatherhead understood that God cared for humankind but that some would find this difficult (since suffering exists in the world). If "God is love" it would be difficult to deny God's Providence.

== By denomination ==
=== Roman Catholic ===
According to Pope Benedict XVI, strong agnosticism in particular contradicts itself in affirming the power of reason to know scientific truth. He blames the exclusion of reasoning from religion and ethics for dangerous pathologies such as crimes against humanity and ecological disasters. "Agnosticism", according to Benedict XVI, "is always the fruit of a refusal of that knowledge which is in fact offered to man ... The knowledge of God has always existed". He asserted that agnosticism is a choice of comfort, pride, dominion, and utility over truth, and is opposed by the following attitudes: the keenest self-criticism, humble listening to the whole of existence, the persistent patience and self-correction of the scientific method, a readiness to be purified by the truth.

The Catholic Church sees merit in examining what it calls "partial agnosticism", specifically those systems that "do not aim at constructing a complete philosophy of the unknowable, but at excluding special kinds of truth, notably religious, from the domain of knowledge". However, the Church is historically opposed to a full denial of the capacity of human reason to know God. The Council of the Vatican declares, "God, the beginning and end of all, can, by the natural light of human reason, be known with certainty from the works of creation".

Blaise Pascal argued that even if there were truly no evidence for God, agnostics should consider what is now known as Pascal's Wager: the infinite expected value of acknowledging God is always greater than the finite expected value of not acknowledging his existence, and thus it is a safer "bet" to choose God.

Peter Kreeft and Ronald Tacelli cited 20 arguments for God's existence, asserting that any demand for evidence testable in a laboratory is in effect asking God, the supreme being, to become man's servant.

== Notable people ==
- John Logie Baird (1888–1946): Scottish engineer and inventor of the world's first practical, publicly demonstrated television system, and also the world's first fully electronic colour television tube. He described himself as "agnostic Christian".
- Gael García Bernal (born 1978): Mexican actor and director, claims to be "culturally Catholic" and "spiritually agnostic".
- Salvador Dalí (1904–1989): Spanish surrealist painter born in Figueres, Spain. Dalí, a skilled draftsman, became best known for the striking and bizarre images in his surrealist work. He allegedly claimed to be both an agnostic and a Roman Catholic.
- Freeman Dyson (1923–2020): British-born American theoretical physicist and mathematician, famous for his work in quantum electrodynamics, solid-state physics, astronomy and nuclear engineering. He describes himself as "a practicing Christian but not a believing Christian".
- John von Neumann (1903–1957): Hungarian-American mathematician and polymath who made major contributions to a vast number of fields, including set theory, functional analysis, quantum mechanics, ergodic theory, geometry, fluid dynamics, economics, linear programming, game theory, computer science, numerical analysis, hydrodynamics, and statistics, as well as many other mathematical fields. It is indicated that he was an "agnostic Catholic" due to his agreement with Pascal's Wager.
- Frank Wilczek (born 1951): American theoretical physicist. Along with David J. Gross and Hugh David Politzer, won the Nobel Prize in Physics in 2004. While he now considers himself agnostic, he still has a fondness for the Church. In fact Wilczek cites Father James Malley for a Jesuit Credo that states: "It is more blessed to ask forgiveness than permission."
- Anthony Kenny – British philosopher (1931–2026)

== See also ==
- Asimov's Guide to the Bible
- Christian atheism
- Cultural Christians
- Jesuism
- Moralistic therapeutic deism
- Nontheist Quakers
