= Casualism (philosophy) =

Philosophical view

Casualism is the philosophical view that the universe, its creation and development, is solely based on randomness.

The concept can be traced back to Epicurus (341 BC – 270 BC), however most of the original sources dealing with the concept have been lost and most material today is based on Diogenes Laërtius's work Lives and Opinions of Eminent Philosophers (c. 3rd century AD), and copies plus developments by Lucretius (c. 99 BC – c. 55 BC) and Cicero (3 January 106 BC – 7 December 43 BC).

Casualism assumes the universe came into existence as a random event, and was not created by any omnipotent entity. Followers have therefore often been accused of atheism. Casualism has certain atheistic traits, but none of the ancient philosophers denied the existence of gods. Epicurus postulates that the gods simply stay out of the day-to-day running of the universe and are not even aware of the existence of man. The philosophy is based on observations of well-known natural phenomena, such as ocean waves or the random fall of rain drops. Casualism is the concept of randomness as a philosophy.

== Related subjects ==
- Free will
- Determinism
- Indeterminism
- Randomness
- Existentialism
