= Moralistic therapeutic deism =

American folk religion

Moralistic therapeutic deism (MTD) is a term that was first introduced in the 2005 book Soul Searching: The Religious and Spiritual Lives of American Teenagers by the sociologist Christian Smith with Melinda Lundquist Denton. The term is used to describe the generalized monotheistic beliefs they consider to be common among young people in the United States. The book is the result of the research project the National Study of Youth and Religion.

== Definition ==
The authors' study found that many young people believe in several moral statutes not exclusive to any of the major world religions. It is not a new religion or theology as such, but identified as a set of commonly held spiritual beliefs. It is this combination of beliefs that they label moralistic therapeutic deism:

1. A God exists who created and ordered the world and watches over human life on earth.
2. God wants people to be good, nice, and fair to each other, as taught in the Bible and by most world religions.
3. The central goal of life is to be happy and to feel good about oneself.
4. God does not need to be particularly involved in one's life except when God is needed to resolve a problem.
5. Good people go to heaven when they die.

These points of belief were compiled from interviews with approximately 3,000 teenagers.

== Authors' analysis ==
The authors say the system is "moralistic" because it "is about inculcating a moralistic approach to life. It teaches that central to living a good and happy life is being a good, moral person." The authors describe the system as being "about providing therapeutic benefits to its adherent" as opposed to being about things like "repentance from sin, of keeping the Sabbath, of living as a servant of a sovereign divine, of steadfastly saying one's prayers, of faithfully observing high holy days, of building character through suffering..." and further as "belief in a particular kind of God: one who exists, created the world, and defines our general moral order, but not one who is particularly personally involved in one's affairs – especially affairs in which one would prefer not to have God involved."

The remoteness of God in this kind of theism explains the choice of the term deism even though "the Deism here is revised from its classical eighteenth-century version by the therapeutic qualifier, making the distant God selectively available for taking care of needs." It views God as "something like a combination Divine Butler and Cosmic Therapist: he's always on call, takes care of any problems that arise, professionally helps his people to feel better about themselves, and does not become too personally involved in the process."

The authors state that "a significant part of Christianity in the United States is actually only tenuously Christian in any sense that is seriously connected to the actual historical Christian tradition, but has rather substantially morphed into Christianity's misbegotten stepcousin, Christian Moralistic Therapeutic Deism." Kenda Creasy Dean, author of the 2010 book Almost Christian: What the Faith of Our Teenagers Is Telling the American Church, notes, "The problem does not seem to be that churches are teaching young people badly, but that we are doing an exceedingly good job of teaching youth what we really believe: namely, that Christianity is not a big deal, that God requires little, and the church is a helpful social institution filled with nice people..." She goes on to say that "if churches practice Moralistic Therapeutic Deism in the name of Christianity, then getting teenagers to church more often is not the solution (conceivably it could make things worse). A more faithful church is the solution... Maybe the issue is simply that the emperor has no clothes."

Moralistic therapeutic deism is often inclusive of different religions. As one teenage study participant said,

Morals play a large part in religion. Morals are good if they're healthy for society. Like Christianity, which is all I know, the values you get from, like, the Ten Commandments. I think every religion is important in its own respect. You know, if you're Muslim, then Islam is the way for you. If you're Jewish, well, that's great too. If you're Christian, well good for you. It's just whatever makes you feel good about you.

== Criticism ==
The originators admit that "no teenager would actually use the terminology 'Moralistic Therapeutic Deist' to describe himself or herself" (See "xenonym"). Some critics have taken issue with the term's use of the word deism, while others have defended it stating that Smith and Denton are right that both the Enlightenment deists and the adherents of Moralistic Therapeutic Deism believe in a generic kind of monotheism in which all religions worship the same God. Joseph Waligore points out that there are several other important features that Moralistic Therapeutic Deism and Enlightenment deism share. Both believe that people do not need scriptures, churches, or ministers to have a personal relationship with God. Both think God only demands moral goodness from people and does not care what religion, if any, people believe in. Both emphasize God's total fairness and goodness, which leads both kinds of deists to reject many religious doctrines.

== Commentary ==
Writer Damon Linker suggested in a 2009 blog post that moralistic therapeutic deism, while theologically "insipid", is "perfectly suited to serve as the civil religion of the highly differentiated twenty-first century United States", a contention that was disputed by Collin Hansen, Ross Douthat, and Rod Dreher.

== See also ==
- American civil religion
- Moralism
- Nominal Christian
- Postchristianity
- Religion in the United States
- "Spiritual but not religious"
- Theophilanthropy
