= Outline of atheism =

Overview of and topical guide to atheism

The following outline is provided as an overview of and topical guide to atheism:

Atheism – Philosophical theories characterised by absence of belief in deities.

== Descriptions of atheism ==
Atheism can be described as all of the following:

- a philosophy –
- a belief –
- a non-belief –
- a stance – taking a position in an argument, a stand on a given issue

== Types of atheism ==
- Positive atheism – the form of atheism that asserts there is no deity. Also called "strong atheism".
  - Explicit atheism – "the absence of theistic belief due to a conscious rejection of it".
- Negative atheism – refers to any type of non-theism other than positive atheism, wherein a person does not believe in the existence of any deity, but without asserting there to be none. Also called "weak atheism".
  - Implicit atheism – "the absence of theistic belief without a conscious rejection of it".
    - Agnostic atheism – philosophical position that encompasses both atheism and agnosticism. Agnostic atheists are atheistic because they do not hold a belief in the existence of any deity and agnostic because they claim that the existence of a deity is either unknowable in principle or currently unknown in fact.

== General atheism concepts ==
- Antitheism – Opposition to theism, and usually to religion
- Atheism and religion
- Criticism of atheism – Criticism of the concepts, validity and impact of atheism
- Demographics of atheism
- Discrimination against atheists – Discrimination based on lack of religious belief

=== Related positions ===
- Theism – Belief in the existence of at least one deity
- Agnosticism – Stance that the existence of God is unknown
  - Agnostic theism – Philosophical view combining theism with agnosticism
  - Agnostic atheism – Lack of belief in the existence of any deity and that such is either unknowable or unknown
  - Ignosticism – Idea that the question of the existence of God is meaningless
  - Apatheism – Apathy toward the existence or non-existence of God
  - Weak agnosticism – Stance that the existence of God is unknown
  - Strong agnosticism – Stance that the existence of God is unknown
  - List of agnostics
- Anti-clericalism – Opposition to religious authority
- Antireligion – Opposition to religion
- Criticism of religion – Criticism against religions
- Freethought – Position that beliefs should be formed only on the basis of logic, reason, and empiricism
- Irreligion – Absence, indifference to, rejection of or hostility towards religion
- Naturalism – Belief that only natural laws and forces operate in the universe
  - Humanistic naturalism – Life stance that embraces human reason, secular ethics, and philosophical naturalism
  - Metaphysical naturalism – Philosophical worldview rejecting anything supernatural
  - Methodological naturalism – Belief that only natural laws and forces operate in the universe
  - Religious naturalism – Naturalism in religion
- Parody religion – Constructed mock religion
  - Flying Spaghetti Monster – Satirical deity
  - Invisible Pink Unicorn – Satirical goddess of a parody religion
- Post-theism – Variant of nontheism
- Secularism – Position that religion should not influence civic and state affairs
  - Secularity – State of being separate from religion
  - Secular humanism – Life stance that embraces human reason, secular ethics, and philosophical naturalism
  - Secularist organizations

== Atheistic arguments ==
- Arguments against God's existence –
  - The argument from free will, also called the paradox of free will or theological fatalism, contends that omniscience and free will are incompatible and that any conception of God that incorporates both properties is therefore inconceivable.
  - Argument from Human Fallibility –The human mind is fallible, and therefore it is unlikely that our understanding of God is accurate.
  - Argument from Scientific Explanations – The natural world can be explained through scientific means and does not require the intervention of a supernatural being. This argument suggests that the natural world can be explained through scientific means and that there is no need to invoke the existence of a supernatural being. For example, the idea that God created the universe is not necessary, given the scientific explanation of the Big Bang theory.
  - Argument from inconsistent revelations – asserts that it is unlikely that God exists because many theologians and faithful adherents have produced conflicting and mutually exclusive revelations. The argument states that since a person not privy to revelation must either accept it or reject it based solely upon the authority of its proponents, and since there is no way for a mere mortal to resolve these conflicting claims by investigation, it is prudent to reserve one's judgment. Also known as the "avoiding the wrong hell problem".
  - Argument from nonbelief – premise that if God existed (and wanted humanity to know it), he would have brought about a situation in which every reasonable person believed in him; however, there are reasonable unbelievers, and therefore, this weighs against God's existence. The argument affirms inconsistency between the world that exists and the world that should exist if God had certain desires combined with the power to see them through.
  - Argument from Religious Diversity – The conflicting claims of different religions about the nature of God and the afterlife make it unlikely that any one of them is true. This argument suggests that the conflicting claims of different religions make it unlikely that any one of them is true. For example, the idea that there is only one God is incompatible with the idea that there are many gods.
  - Argument from poor design – reasons that an omnipotent, omniscient, omnibenevolent creator God would create organisms that have optimal design. Organisms have features that are sub-optimal. Therefore, God either did not create these organisms or is not omnipotent, omniscient, and omnibenevolent. Also called the "dysteleological argument".
  - Argument from Lack of Evidence – There is no conclusive evidence for the existence of God and therefore it is reasonable to conclude that God does not exist. This argument suggests that there is no conclusive evidence for the existence of God, and therefore it is reasonable to conclude that God does not exist.
  - Incompatible-properties argument – argument that the existence of evil is incompatible with the concept of an omnipotent and perfectly good God. A "good" God is incompatible with some possible worlds, thus incapable of creating them without losing the property of being a totally good God. A "good" God can create only "good" worlds.
  - Omnipotence paradox – states that: if a being can perform any action, then it should be able to create a task which this being is unable to perform; hence, this being cannot perform all actions. Yet, on the other hand, if this being cannot create a task that it is unable to perform, then there exists something it cannot do.
  - Problem of evil – question of how to explain evil if there exists a deity that is omnibenevolent, omnipotent, and omniscient. Some philosophers have claimed that the existences of such a god and of evil are logically incompatible or unlikely.
  - Argument from Personal Experience – One's own personal experiences and observations do not provide any evidence for the existence of God. This argument suggests that personal experiences and observations do not provide any evidence for the existence of God. For example, a person's own experience of the natural world does not provide any evidence for the existence of God, as natural phenomena can be explained through scientific means.
  - Fate of the unlearned – eschatological question about the ultimate destiny of people who have not been exposed to a particular theology or doctrine and thus have no opportunity to embrace it. The question is whether those who never hear of requirements issued through divine revelations will be punished for failure to abide by those requirements.
  - Problem of Hell – ethical problem related to religions in which portrayals of Hell are ostensibly cruel, and are thus inconsistent with the concepts of a just, moral and omnibenevolent God.
- Atheist's Wager – goes something like this: "You should live your life and try to make the world a better place for your being in it, whether or not you believe in god. If there is no god, you have lost nothing and will be remembered fondly by those you left behind. If there is a benevolent god, he will judge you on your merits and not just on whether or not you believed in him."
- Russell's teapot – analogy first coined by the philosopher Bertrand Russell (1872–1970) to illustrate the idea that the philosophic burden of proof lies upon a person making scientifically unfalsifiable claims rather than shifting the burden of proof to others, specifically in the case of religion. Russell wrote that if he claimed that a teapot were orbiting the Sun somewhere in space between the Earth and Mars, it would be nonsensical for him to expect others not to doubt him on the grounds that they could not prove him wrong. Sometimes called the "celestial teapot" or "cosmic teapot".
- Theological noncognitivism – argument that religious language, and specifically words like "god", are not cognitively meaningful. Theological noncognitivists await a coherent definition of the word God (or of any other metaphysical utterance purported to be discussable) before being able to engage in arguments for or against God's existence.
- Ultimate Boeing 747 gambit – counter-argument to the modern form of the argument from design, by Richard Dawkins. A central thesis of the argument is that compared to creationism, evolution by natural selection requires the supposition of fewer hypothetical processes and thus, according to Occam's razor, is a better explanation than the "God hypothesis".

== History of atheism ==
- New Atheism – 21st-century antitheist movement
- State atheism – Official promotion of atheism by a government

== Atheism publications ==
- Stein, Gordon, ed. (1985). The Encyclopedia of Unbelief. Buffalo, N.Y.: Prometheus Books. ISBN 9780879753078.
- 'Flynn, Tom (2007). The New Encyclopedia of Unbelief. Amherst, N.Y.: Prometheus Books. ISBN 9781591023913.

== Persons influential in atheism ==
- Diagoras of Melos – 5th-century BCE Greek poet and sophist
- Theodorus the Atheist – Ancient Greek philosopher
- Ibn al-Rawandi – Early skeptic of Islam and a critic of religion in general (827–920 CE)
- Baron d'Holbach – German-born French philosopher (1723–1789)
- Bertrand Russell – Mathematician and philosopher
- Periyar E. V. Ramasamy – Indian social activist and politician (1879–1973)
- Goparaju Ramachandra Rao – Indian social activist (1902–1975)
- Isaac Asimov – American writer and biochemist (1920–1992)
- Jordan Howard Sobel – Canadian-American philosopher (1929–2010)
- Christopher Hitchens – British and American author and journalist (1949–2011)
- Stephen Hawking – English theoretical physicist (1942–2018)
- Richard Dawkins – British evolutionary biologist and author (born 1941)
- Daniel Dennett – American philosopher (1942–2024)
- Sam Harris – American neuroscientist and philosopher (born 1967)
- Lawrence Krauss – American particle physicist and cosmologist (born 1954)
- Michael Shermer – American science writer (born 1954)
- Matt Dillahunty – American atheist activist (born 1969)
