= Spectrum of theistic probability =

Way of categorizing one's belief regarding the probability of the existence of a deity

Popularized by Richard Dawkins in The God Delusion, the spectrum of theistic probability is a way of categorizing one's belief regarding the probability of the existence of a deity.

== Atheism, theism, and agnosticism ==
J. J. C. Smart argues that the distinction between atheism and agnosticism is unclear, and many people who have passionately described themselves as agnostics were in fact atheists. He writes that this mischaracterization is based on an unreasonable philosophical skepticism that would not allow us to make any claims to knowledge about the world. He proposes instead the following analysis:

Let us consider the appropriateness or otherwise of someone (call him 'Philo') describing himself as a theist, atheist or agnostic. I would suggest that if Philo estimates the various plausibilities to be such that on the evidence before him the probability of theism comes out near to one he should describe himself as a theist and if it comes out near zero he should call himself an atheist, and if it comes out somewhere in the middle he should call himself an agnostic. There are no strict rules about this classification because the borderlines are vague. If need be, like a middle-aged man who is not sure whether to call himself bald or not bald, he should explain himself more fully.

== Dawkins' formulation ==
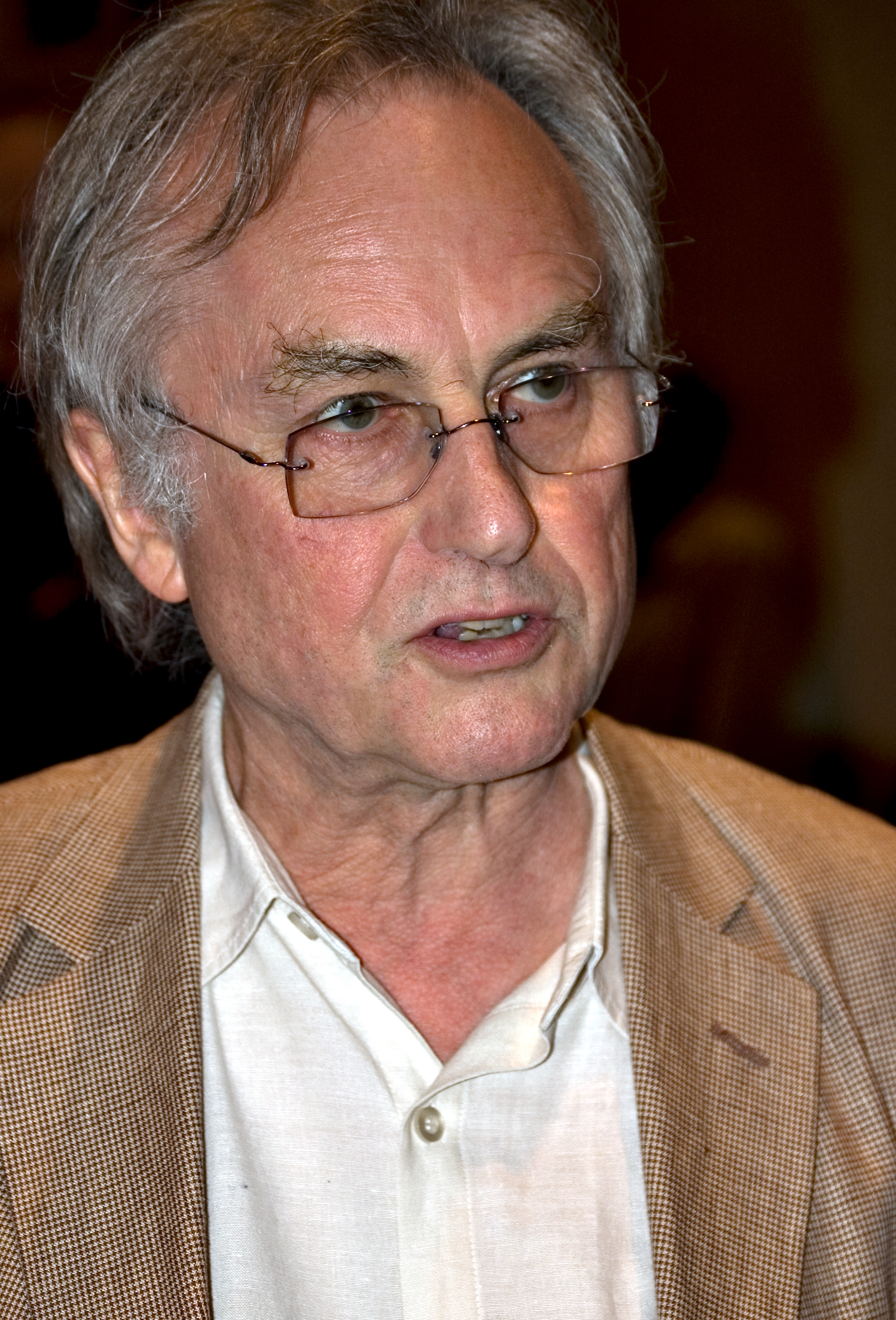
Richard Dawkins at the 35th American Atheists Convention

In The God Delusion, Richard Dawkins posits that "the existence of God is a scientific hypothesis like any other." He goes on to propose a continuous "spectrum of probabilities" between two extremes of opposite certainty, which can be represented by seven "milestones". Dawkins suggests definitive statements to summarize one's place along the spectrum of theistic probability. These "milestones" are:

1. Strong theist. 100% probability of God. In the words of Carl Jung: "I do not believe, I know."
2. De facto theist. Very high probability but short of 100%. "I don't know for certain, but I strongly believe in God and live my life on the assumption that he is there." - Includes agnostic theism.
3. Leaning towards theism. Higher than 50% but not very high. "I am very uncertain, but I am inclined to believe in God." - Includes agnostic theism.
4. Completely impartial. Exactly 50%. "God's existence and non-existence are exactly equiprobable."
5. Leaning towards atheism. Lower than 50% but not very low. "I do not know whether God exists but I'm inclined to be skeptical." - Includes agnostic atheism.
6. De facto atheist. Very low probability, but short of zero. "I don't know for certain but I think God is very improbable, and I live my life on the assumption that he is not there." - Implicit and explicit atheism • positive and negative atheism • agnostic atheism
7. Strong atheist. "I know there is no God, with the same conviction as Jung knows there is one." - Implicit and explicit atheism • positive and negative atheism

Dawkins argues that while there appear to be plenty of individuals that would place themselves as "1" due to the strictness of religious doctrine against doubt, most atheists do not consider themselves "7" because atheism arises from a lack of evidence and evidence can always change a thinking person's mind. In print, Dawkins self-identified as a "6". When interviewed by Bill Maher and later by Anthony Kenny, he suggested "6.9" to be more accurate.

== See also ==
- Agnostic atheism
- Apatheism
- Ignosticism
- Nontheism
