= Demographics of atheism =

Accurate demographics of atheism are difficult to obtain since conceptions of atheism vary considerably across different cultures and languages, ranging from an active concept to being unimportant or not developed. Also in some countries and regions atheism carries a strong stigma, making it harder to count atheists in these countries. In global studies, the number of people without a religion is usually higher than the number of people without a belief in a deity and the number of people who agree with statements on lacking a belief in a deity is usually higher than the number of people who self-identify as "atheists".

According to sociologist Phil Zuckerman, broad estimates of those who have an absence of belief in a deity range from 500 to 750 million people worldwide as of 2006. An earlier estimate stated that there were 200 million to 240 million self-identified atheists worldwide as of the year 2000, with China and Russia being major contributors to these figures. According to sociologists Ariela Keysar and Juhem Navarro-Rivera's review of numerous global studies on atheism, there are 450 to 500 million positive atheists and agnostics worldwide (7% of the world's population) with China alone accounting for 200 million of that demographic as of 2013. Zuckerman, Galen and Pasquale estimated there were 400 million nonreligious or nontheistic people as of 2016. Relative to its own populations, Zuckerman ranks the top five countries with the highest possible ranges of atheists and agnostics: Sweden (46–85%), Vietnam (81%), Denmark (43–80%), Norway (31–72%), and Japan (64–65%).

As of 2020, the majority (78%) of the global nonreligious or unaffiliated demographic resided in Asia-Pacific. China alone, whose government promotes atheism, makes up 67% of the global religiously unaffliated demographic. The remainder reside in Europe (12%), North America (5%), Latin America and the Caribbean (4%), sub-Saharan Africa (2%) and the Middle East and North Africa (less than 1%). The prevalence of atheism in Africa and South America typically falls below 10%. According to the Pew Research Center's 2012 global study of 230 countries and territories, 16% of the world's population is not affiliated with a religion, while 84% are affiliated. Furthermore, the global study noted that many of the unaffiliated, which include atheists and agnostics, still have various religious beliefs and practices.

Historical records of atheist philosophy span several millennia. The first occurrences of atheistic schools are found in Indian thought and have existed from the times of ancient Hinduism. Western atheism has its roots in pre-Socratic Greek philosophy, but did not emerge as a distinct perspective on religious claims until the late Enlightenment.

Discrepancies exist among sources as to how atheist and religious demographics are changing. Questions to assess non-belief may ask about negation of the prevailing belief, rather than an assertion of positive atheism. Also, self-identification is not congruous to people's lack of beliefs automatically. For instance, merely not having a belief in a god, for whatever reason, does not automatically mean that people self-identify as an "atheist". According to global Win-Gallup International studies, 13% of respondents were "convinced atheists" in 2012, 11% were "convinced atheists" in 2015, and in 2017, 9% were "convinced atheists". Some global studies have indicated that global atheism may be in decline due to irreligious countries having the lowest birth rates in the world and religious countries having higher birth rates in general.

== Studies and statistics ==
=== Methodological issues ===
The demographics of atheism are difficult to quantify. Words like God and atheism seldom translate well across cultures or languages, and if they are there, they have variant meanings which make cross-cultural comparisons tenuous. So it can be hard to draw boundaries between atheism, non-religious beliefs, and non-theistic religious and spiritual beliefs. Furthermore, atheists may not report themselves as such, to avoid suffering from social stigma, discrimination, and persecution in some countries.

Because some governments have strongly promoted atheism and others have strongly condemned it, atheism may be either over-reported or under-reported for different countries. The accuracy of any method of estimation is debatable, as there are opportunities to misreport (intentionally or not) a category of people without an organizational structure. Also, many surveys on religious identification ask people to identify themselves as "agnostics" or "atheists", which is potentially confusing, since these terms are interpreted differently; some identify themselves as agnostic atheists. Additionally, many of these surveys only gauge the number of irreligious people, not the number of actual atheists, or group the two together. For example, research indicates that the fastest growing religious status may be "no religion" in the United States, but this includes all kinds of atheists, agnostics, and theists. According to the CIA World Factbook, non-religious people make up 9.66%, while one fifth of them are atheists.

=== Diversity ===
Statistics on atheism are often difficult to represent accurately for a variety of reasons. Atheism is a position compatible with other forms of identity including religions. Anthropologist Jack David Eller states that "atheism is quite a common position, even within religion" and that "surprisingly, atheism is not the opposite or lack, let alone the enemy, of religion but is the most common form of religion." Furthermore, he observes that "some atheists call themselves 'spiritual', and as we have shown above, atheism in its broadest sense does not preclude other religious concepts like nature spirits, dead ancestors, and supernatural forces." In many cultures, little conceptual or practical distinction is made between "natural" and "supernatural" phenomena and the very notions of "religious" and "nonreligious" dissolve into unimportance, especially since people have beliefs in other supernatural or spiritual things irrespective of belief in gods. For instance, in the Netherlands some people with lack of beliefs in gods do have a variety of beliefs in other supernatural entities or things.

Atheists are complex and not always devoid of religious or spiritual involvement. "Atheist churches" such as Sunday Assembly and others have emerged in multiple countries (e.g. USA, Britain, Australia) which deal with community needs that religious services often provide. Nontheistic religions such as Buddhism, Jainism, along with atheistic schools in Hinduism, and other Indian schools like Carvaka, Ajivika have played a significant part in Asian cultures for millennia.

Globally, some atheists also consider themselves Agnostic, Buddhist, Hindu, Jains, Taoist, or hold other related philosophical beliefs. Some, like Secular Jews and Shintoists, may indulge in some religious activities as a way of connecting with their culture, all the while being atheist. Therefore, given limited poll options, some may use other terms to describe their identity. Some politically motivated organizations that report or gather population statistics may, intentionally or unintentionally, misrepresent atheists. Survey designs may bias results by the wording of questions and the available response options. Statistics are generally collected on the assumption that religion is a categorical variable. Instruments have been designed to measure attitudes toward religion, including one that was used by L. L. Thurstone. This may be a particularly important consideration among people who have neutral attitudes, as it is more likely that prevailing social norms will influence the responses of such people on survey questions that effectively force respondents to categorize themselves either as belonging to a particular religion or as belonging to no religion. A negative perception of atheists and pressure from family and peers may also cause some atheists to disassociate themselves from atheism. Misunderstanding of the term may also be a reason some label themselves differently.

For example, a Canadian poll released 12 September 2011 sampled 1,129 Canadian adults and collected data on the numbers of declared atheists. These numbers conflicted with the latest Canadian census data that presupposed that a religious affiliation predisposed a belief in a deity and was based on a poorly worded question. A quote from the study:

The data also revealed some interesting facts about Canadians' beliefs:

- 53% of Canadians believe in a god. What is of particular interest is that 28% of Protestants, 33% of Catholics, and 23% of those who attend weekly religious services do not.
- 23% of those with no religious identity still believe in a God.

In 2023, Pew stated that 77% of self-identified "atheists" in the US do not believe in either a higher power or a god, while 23% of self-identified atheists do believe in a higher power of some kind, but not a god; with Pew stating "not all self-described atheists fit the literal definition of “atheist”".

The 2024 Meaning Making Survey focused on "religiously unaffiliated" respondents and noted that only 19% of this group held atheistic beliefs. In terms of supernatural beliefs, belief in ghosts was held by 36% of agnostics and 26% of atheists, belief in reincarnation was held by 24% of agnostics and 20% of atheists, belief in an afterlife was held by 25% of agnostics and 15% of atheists.

Out of all Americans who do not believe in a god, 5% identified as Catholic while 9% identified as Protestant and other Christian according to the 2007 Pew Religious Landscape survey. Out of all Americans who identify as unaffiliated including atheists and agnostics, 41% were raised Protestant and 28% were raised Catholic according to the 2014 Pew Religious Landscape survey.

Even when people directly claim not to believe in a deity, they still do not self-identify as "atheist". For instance, 41% of Norwegians, 48% of the French, and 54% of Czechs claimed not to believe in a deity, but only 10%, 19%, and 20% of those respondents, respectively, self-identified as "atheist". In the United States, only 5% of the population did not have a belief in a god and out of that small group only 24% self-identified as "atheist", while 15% self-identified as "agnostic" and 35% self-identified as "nothing in particular".

Though China has state atheism, 85% of the population practice various kinds of religious behaviors with some regularity.

In the Netherlands, beliefs of "convinced atheists" are quite diverse: 41.1% of them say they believe in telepathy, 21.1% in reincarnation, 13.3% in life after death, and 1.6% in heaven. The percentages on telepathy and reincarnation were similar to the percentages of "religious people" in the Netherlands. Furthermore, the author of the study notes, "Thus, despite the fact that they claim to be convinced atheists and the majority deny the existence of a personal god, a rather large minority of the Dutch convinced atheists believe in a supernatural power!"

A 2004 survey by the BBC in 10 countries showed the proportion of the population "who don't believe in God" to be close to 17% in the countries surveyed; however, 8% of the respondents specifically stated that they consider themselves to be "atheists". Diversity was observed in that "across the entire sample, almost 30% of all atheists surveyed said they sometimes prayed."

=== Personality profiles and social trends ===
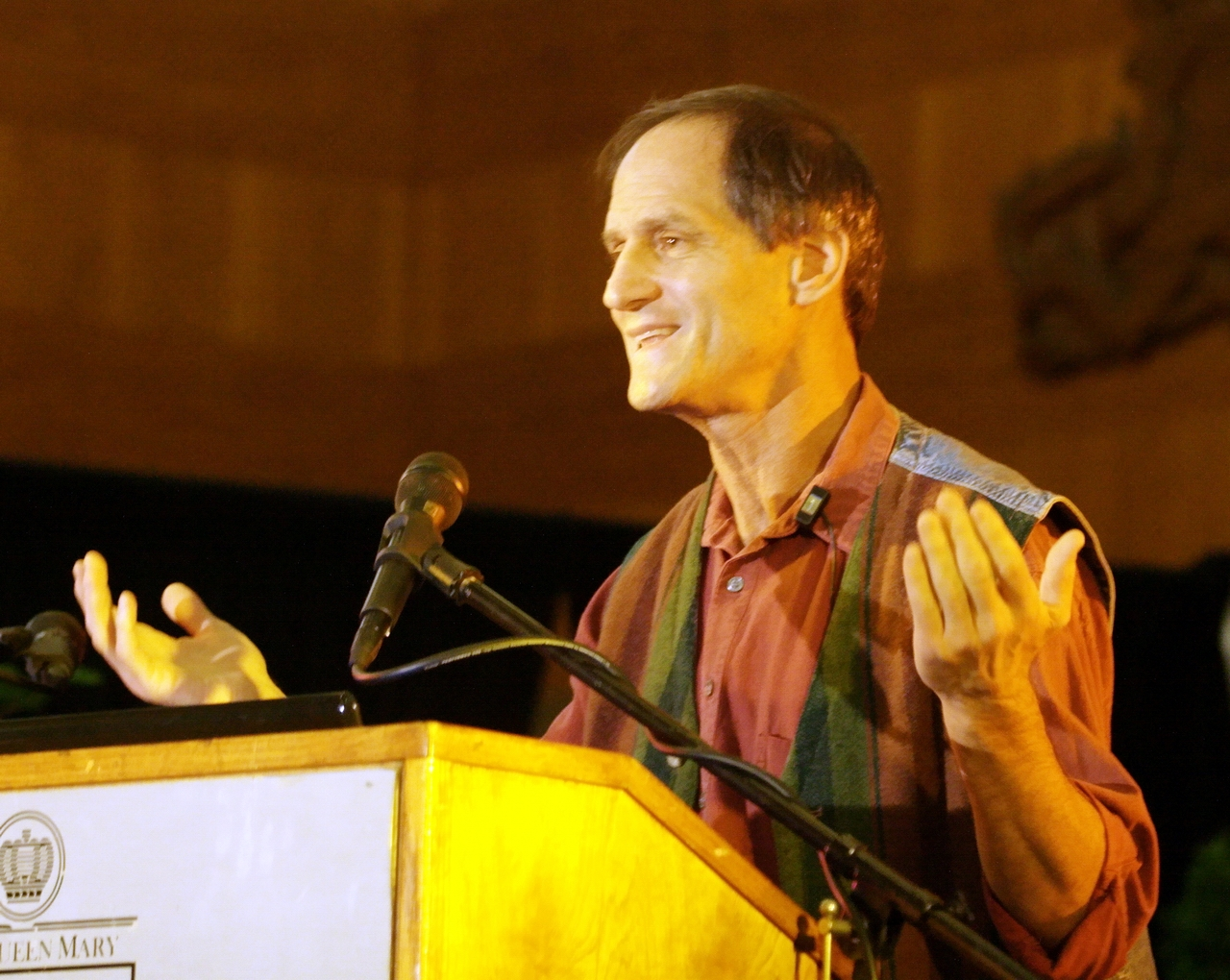
Michael Newdow speaks at the Atheist Alliance International Convention.

A study on global religiosity, secularity, and well-being, sociologists Gregory Paul and Phil Zuckerman note that it is unlikely that most atheists and agnostics do not believe in the gods based on a careful analysis of philosophical and scientific arguments alone, since science testing scores in societies where atheism or theism is widespread, can be just as poor and such societies can have widespread supernatural beliefs besides gods. Reviewing psychological studies on atheists, Miguel Farias noted that studies concluding that analytical thinking leads to lower religious belief "do not imply that that atheists are more conscious or reflective of their own beliefs, or that atheism is the outcome of a conscious refutation of previously held religious beliefs" since they too have variant beliefs such as in conspiracy theories of the naturalistic variety. In terms of apostasy, Farias notes that a greater proportion of people who leave religion do so for motivational rather than rational reasons and the majority of deconversions occur in adolescence and young adulthood when one is emotionally volatile. Furthermore, Farias notes that atheists are indistinguishable from New Age individuals or Gnostics since there are commonalities such as being individualistic, non-conformist, liberal, and valuing hedonism and sensation. According to Phil Zuckerman, the majority of atheists and other secular people who were raised with a religion, leave their religion and beliefs in their late teens or early twenties while a smaller proportion do so at a mature age.

A study on personality and religiosity found that members of secular organizations (like the international Center for Inquiry) have similar personality profiles to members of religious groups. This study found that members of secular organizations are very likely to label themselves primarily as "atheists", but also very likely to consider themselves humanists. It was also found that secular group members show no significant differences in their negative or positive affect. The surveyed individuals also had similar profiles for conscientiousness (discipline or impulse control, and acting on values like "pursuit of truth"). Secular group members tended to be less agreeable (e.g. more likely to hold unpopular, socially challenging views), as well as more open minded (e.g. more likely to consider new ideas) than members of religious groups. Luke Galen, a personality researcher, writes "Many previously reported characteristics associated with religiosity are a function not of belief itself, but of strong convictions and group identification." Catherine Caldwell-Harris notes that "non-believers" are interested in social justice concerns and posits that this is due to their lack of belief in an afterlife, leading to a focus on what can be fixed here and now. Another study by Caldwell-Harris describes atheists as being capable of experiencing awe, which she states debunks stereotypes of atheists as "cynical and joyless". A 2014 study created six different personality profiles of 'types' of nonbelievers and compared them to Big Five personality traits. In countries which have high levels of atheism such as Scandinavian nations, atheist organizations there generally have very low membership and only those that have links to a political party or offer legalized rituals have some noticeable membership.

According to William Bainbridge's international study, atheism is common among people whose interpersonal social obligations are weak and is also connected to lower fertility rates in advanced industrial nations.

In a global study on atheism, sociologist Phil Zuckerman noted that countries with higher levels of atheism also had the highest suicide rates compared to countries with lower levels of atheism. He concludes that correlations does not necessarily indicate causation in either case. A study on depression and suicide suggested that those without a religious affiliation have a higher suicide attempt rates than those with a religious affiliation. A study into mental well-being in religious and non-religious people found that mental well-being for both religious people and non-religious people hinged on the certainty of their belief, and that previous studies had not controlled for the effect of belonging to a group when studying churchgoers. Benjamin Beit-Hallahmi regarded atheists in Western society to be "much more likely to be a man, married, with higher education", and regarded the personality of atheists to be "less authoritarian and suggestible, less dogmatic, less prejudiced, more tolerant of others, law-abiding, compassionate, conscientious, and well educated. They are of high intelligence, and many are committed to the intellectual and scholarly life". A review of the literature found that being non-religious did not necessarily entail poorer mental health.

== Geographic distribution ==
Though atheists are in the minority in most countries, they are relatively common in Europe, Canada, Australia, New Zealand, Uruguay, East Asia and present communist states. It is difficult to determine actual atheist numbers.

In 1916, 1,000 leading American scientists were randomly chosen from American Men of Science and 41.8% believed God existed, 41.5% disbelieved, and 16.7% had doubts/did not know. When the study was replicated 80 years later using American Men and Women of Science in 1996 results were similar, with 39.3% believing God exists, 45.3% disbelieved, and 14.5% had doubts/did not know.

A 1998 survey based on a self-selected sample of biological and physical scientists of the National Academy of Sciences in the United States found that 7% believed in the existence of God, 72.2% did not, and 20.8% were agnostic or had doubts. Eugenie Scott argued that there are methodological issues in the study, including ambiguity in the questions. A study on leading scientists in the US, with clearer wording and allowing for a broader concept of "god", concluded that 40% of prominent scientists believe in god.

A 2002 survey by Adherents.com estimates the proportion of the world's people who are "secular, non-religious, agnostics and atheists" at about 14%.

A 2004 survey by the BBC in 10 countries showed the proportion of the population "who don't believe in God" varying between 0% (Nigeria) and 39% (UK), with an average close to 17% in the countries surveyed, however, 8% of the respondents specifically stated that they consider themselves to be "atheists". Diversity was observed in the views of atheists including that "across the entire sample, almost 30% of all atheists surveyed said they sometimes prayed." 65% of those polled in a 2011 survey by the British Humanist Association answered no to the question "Are you religious?"

A 2004 survey by the CIA in the World Factbook estimates about 12.5% of the world's population are non-religious, and about 2.4% are atheists.

A 2005 poll by AP/Ipsos surveyed ten countries. Of the developed nations, people in the United States were "most sure" of the existence of God or a higher power (2% atheist, 4% agnostic), while France had the most skeptics (19% atheist, 16% agnostic). On the religion question, South Korea had the greatest percentage without a religion (41%) while Italy had the smallest (5%).

Sociologist Phil Zuckerman's global studies on atheism have indicated that global atheism may be in decline due to irreligious countries having the lowest birth rates in the world and religious countries having higher birth rates in general.

A 2010 Pew Research global study found that 16 percent of the global population to be unaffiliated with a religion, however, Pew notes that "more than three-quarters of the religiously unaffiliated live in Asia, the majority in China. Many of the people in this group do hold some religious or spiritual beliefs and may even believe in a deity, but they do not identify with a particular faith." Of the global atheist and nonreligious population, 76% reside in Asia and the Pacific, while the remainder reside in Europe (12%), North America (5%), Latin America and the Caribbean (4%), sub-Saharan Africa (2%) and the Middle East and North Africa (less than 1%).

In terms of the United States, a 2012 Pew report showed that 32% of people under 30, 21% of people between the ages of 30 and 49, 15% of people between the ages of 50–64 and 9% of people over the age of 65 could be characterized as religiously unaffiliated. However, 68% of all the unaffiliated expressed belief in God and out of the whole US population, only 2.4% self identified as "atheist".

A 2013 poll by UPI/Harris showed that three-quarters of U.S. adults say they believe in God, down from 82 percent in 2005, 2007 and 2009. Just under 2-in-10 U.S. adults described themselves as very religious, with an additional 4-in-10 describing themselves as somewhat religious down from 49 percent in 2007. Twenty-three percent of Americans identified themselves as not at all religious, nearly double the 12 percent reported in 2007.

According to WIN/Gallup International, in their 2012 poll of 57 countries, 23% of respondents were "not religious" and 13% were "convinced atheists" and in their 2014 poll of 65 countries 22% were "not religious" and 11% were "convinced atheists". However, other researchers have advised caution with the WIN/Gallup International figures since other surveys which use the same wording, have conducted many waves for decades, and have a bigger sample size, such as World Values Survey; have consistently reached lower figures for the number of atheists worldwide.

A 2014 survey by David Chalmers and David Bourget on nearly 1,000 professional philosophers from 99 leading departments of philosophy shows that 72.8% considered themselves as atheists, 14.6% considered themselves as theist, and 12.6% as something else.

A Pew 2015 global projection study for religion and nonreligion projects that between 2010 and 2050 there was some initial increases of the unaffiliated followed by a decline by 2050 due to lower global fertility rates among this demographic.

The 2015 Pew Religious Landscape survey reported that as of 2014, 22.8% of the American population is religiously unaffiliated, atheists made up 3.1% and agnostics made up 4% of the US population. In 2020, the World Religion Database estimated that the countries with the highest percentage of atheists were North Korea and Sweden. A 2023 Gallup International survey found that Sweden was the country with the highest percentage of citizens that stated they do not believe in God.

=== Africa ===
==== Algeria ====
A World Values Survey (WVS Wave 6, 2010–2014) study conducted in Algeria found that 0.8% of respondents explicitly self-identified as "convinced atheists", while the World Religion Database (WRD, 2025 estimate) estimated that approximately 1.44% identified as agnostic.

==== Cameroon ====
A TNSRMS Cameroon survey, commissioned by WIN-Gallup International, conducted from 29 October 2012, to 5 November 2012, found that 3% of Cameroon were "convinced atheists."

==== Egypt ====
In November 2013, al-Sabah claim that up to 3 million (3.57%) Egyptians were atheists.

==== Ghana ====
A TNS RMS Ghana survey, commissioned by WIN-Gallup International, conducted from 7 November 2012, to 22 November 2012, found that 0% of Ghana were "convinced atheists."

==== Kenya ====
An Infinite Insight survey, commissioned by WIN-Gallup International, conducted in November 2014, found that 2% of Kenya were "convinced atheists."

==== Morocco ====
A BJ Group survey, commissioned by WIN-Gallup International, conducted on 8 November 2014, to 19 November 2014 found that 1% of Morocco were "convinced atheists."

==== Nigeria ====
A Market Trends International survey, commissioned by WIN-Gallup International, conducted from 13 October 2014 to 9 November 2014, found that 2% of Nigeria were "convinced atheists."

==== South Africa ====
A Topline Research Solutions (TRS) survey, commissioned by WIN-Gallup International, conducted from 24 December 2012, to 2 December 2012, found that 4% of South Africa were "convinced atheists."

==== South Sudan ====
An Infinite Insight survey, commissioned by WIN-Gallup International, conducted from 5 November 2012, to 6 December 2012, found that 6% of South Sudan were "convinced atheists."

==== Tunisia ====
A Emrhod International survey, commissioned by WIN-Gallup International, conducted from 24 November 2012, to 2 December 2012, found that 0% of Tunisia were "convinced atheists."

=== Asia ===
==== Afghanistan ====
A ACSOR-Surveys survey, commissioned by WIN-Gallup International, conducted from 1 November 2014 to 10 November 2014, found that 0.03% of Afghanistan were "convinced atheists."

==== Armenia ====
A MPG LLC (Marketing Professional Group) survey, commissioned by WIN-Gallup International, conducted on November 2014, found that 2% of Armenia were "convinced atheists."

==== Azerbaijan ====
A SIAR Research and Consulting Group survey, commissioned by WIN-Gallup International, conducted from 16 October 2014, to 12 November 2014, found that 0.1% of Azerbaijan were "convinced atheists."

==== Bangladesh ====
A SRGB (SRG Bangladesh Limited) survey, commissioned by WIN-Gallup International, conducted from 5 November 2014, to 25 November 2014, found that 0.4% of Bangladesh were "convinced atheists."

==== China ====
A WisdomAsia survey, commissioned by WIN-Gallup International, conducted from 1 November 2014, to 15 November 2014, found that 61% of China were "convinced atheists."

==== Georgia ====
A GORBI (Georgian Opinion Research Business International) survey, commissioned by WIN-Gallup International, conducted from 15 October 2014, to 15 November 2014, found that 1% of the Georgia were "convinced atheists."

==== Hong Kong ====
A CSG survey, commissioned by WIN-Gallup International, conducted from 27 October 2014, to 16 November 2014, found that 34% of the Hong Kong were "convinced atheists."

==== India ====
A DataPrompt International survey, commissioned by WIN-Gallup International, conducted from 20 October 2014 to 14 November 2014, found that 3% of India were "convinced atheists."

==== Indonesia ====
A Deka survey, commissioned by WIN-Gallup International, conducted from 15 October 2014 to 5 November 2014, found that 0.19% of Indonesia were "convinced atheists."

==== Iran ====
According to a survey by Gamaan (2020), 8.8% of Iranians self identify as atheists, 22.2% non-religious, 5.8% Agnostic and 2.7% humanist.

In 2011 According to Pew Research Center 99.8% of Iranian were muslim and 0.1% were atheist.

According to Deutsche Welle Farsi, during the period of the Islamic Republic of Iran regime, religious disbelief, has increased like a tsunami among Iranian youth, in practice, many people of Iran's population, most of whom are teenagers and young people, are not Muslim.

==== Iraq ====
A IIACSS survey, commissioned by WIN-Gallup International, conducted from 20 November 2012, to 2 December 2012, found that 0% of Iraq were "convinced atheists."

==== Israel ====
A Maagar Mochot ltd. survey, commissioned by WIN-Gallup International, conducted on November 2014, found that 8% of Israel were "convinced atheists."

==== Japan ====
A NRC (Nippon Research Center) survey, commissioned by WIN-Gallup International, conducted from 31 October 2014 to 12 November 2014, found that 32% of Japan were "convinced atheists."

==== Jordan ====
According to Inglehart et al. (2004), less than 1% of those in Jordan do not believe in God.

==== Kazakhstan ====
A Romir survey, commissioned by WIN-Gallup International, conducted from 23 October 2014 to 30 October 2014, found that 8% of Kazakhstan were "convinced atheists."

==== Kyrgyzstan ====
According to Froese (2004), 7% of those in Kyrgyzstan are atheist.

==== Lebanon ====
A REACH (Research and Consulting House) survey, commissioned by WIN-Gallup International, conducted from 17 October 2014 to 5 November 2014, found that 2% of Lebanon were "convinced atheists."

==== Malaysia ====
A TNS Malaysia survey, commissioned by WIN-Gallup International, conducted from 27 October 2014 to 15 November 2014, found that 3% of Malaysia were "convinced atheists."

==== Mongolia ====
According to Barret et al. (2001), 9% of those in Mongolia are atheist.

==== North Korea ====
Barret et al. (2001) report that 15% of North Koreans are atheist.

==== Pakistan ====
A Gallup Pakistan survey, commissioned by WIN-Gallup International, conducted from 2 October 2014 to 12 October 2014, found that 1% of Pakistan were "convinced atheists."

==== Palestine ====
A Palestinian Center for Public Opinion (PCPO) survey, commissioned by WIN-Gallup International, conducted from 2 November 2014 to 12 November 2014, found that 1% of Palestine were "convinced atheists."

==== Philippines ====
A PSRC (Philippines Survey & Research Center Inc.) survey, commissioned by WIN-Gallup International, conducted on 9 October 2014, to 12 November 2014 found that 1% of Philippines were "convinced atheists."

==== Saudi Arabia ====
A PARC (Pan Arab Research Center) survey, commissioned by WIN-Gallup International, conducted in November 2011, found that 5% of Saudi Arabia were "convinced atheists."

==== Singapore ====
Inglehart et al. (2004) found that 13% of those in Singapore do not believe in God.

==== South Korea ====
A Be Research (Index Kosova) survey, commissioned by WIN-Gallup International, conducted from 1 November 2014 to 7 November 2014, found that 6% of South Korea were "convinced atheists."

==== Taiwan ====
According to Inglehart et al. (2004), 14% of those in Taiwan do not believe in God.

==== Tajikistan ====
According to Froese (2004), 2% of those in Tajikistan are atheist.

==== Thailand ====
A Infosearch survey, commissioned by WIN-Gallup International, conducted from 12 October 2014 to 13 November 2014, found that 1% of Thailand were "convinced atheists."

==== Turkey ====
KONDA Polling 2010–2015
| Year | Atheism in Turkey |
|---|---|
| 2010 | 2.3% |
| 2011 | 2.1% |
| 2012 | 2.2% |
| 2013 | 2.2% |
| 2014 | 2.5% |
| 2015 | 2.9% |

According to KONDA Research and Consultancy, the percentage of atheists in Turkey has tripled in 10 years and went from 1% in 2008, to 3% in 2018.

==== Turkmenistan ====
According to Froese (2004), 2% of those in Turkmenistan are atheist.

==== Uzbekistan ====
A Romir survey, commissioned by WIN-Gallup International, conducted from 16 November 2012, to 6 December 2012, found that 2% of Uzbekistan were "convinced atheists."

==== Vietnam ====
An Indochina Research survey, commissioned by WIN-Gallup International, conducted on 17 October 2014, to 31 October 2014 found that 13% of Vietnam were "convinced atheists."

=== Europe ===
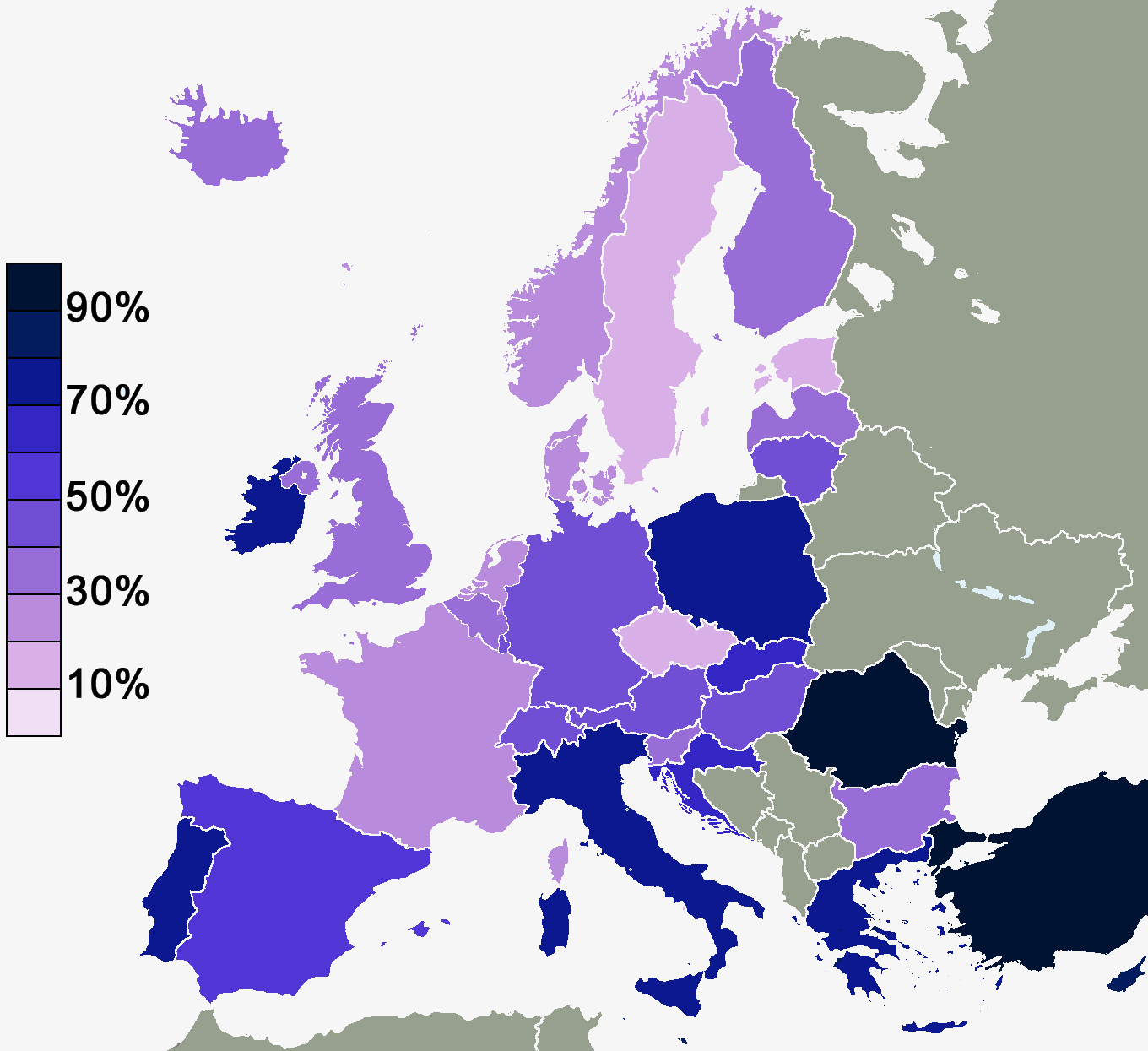
Percentages of people in European countries who said in 2010 that they "believe there is a God"

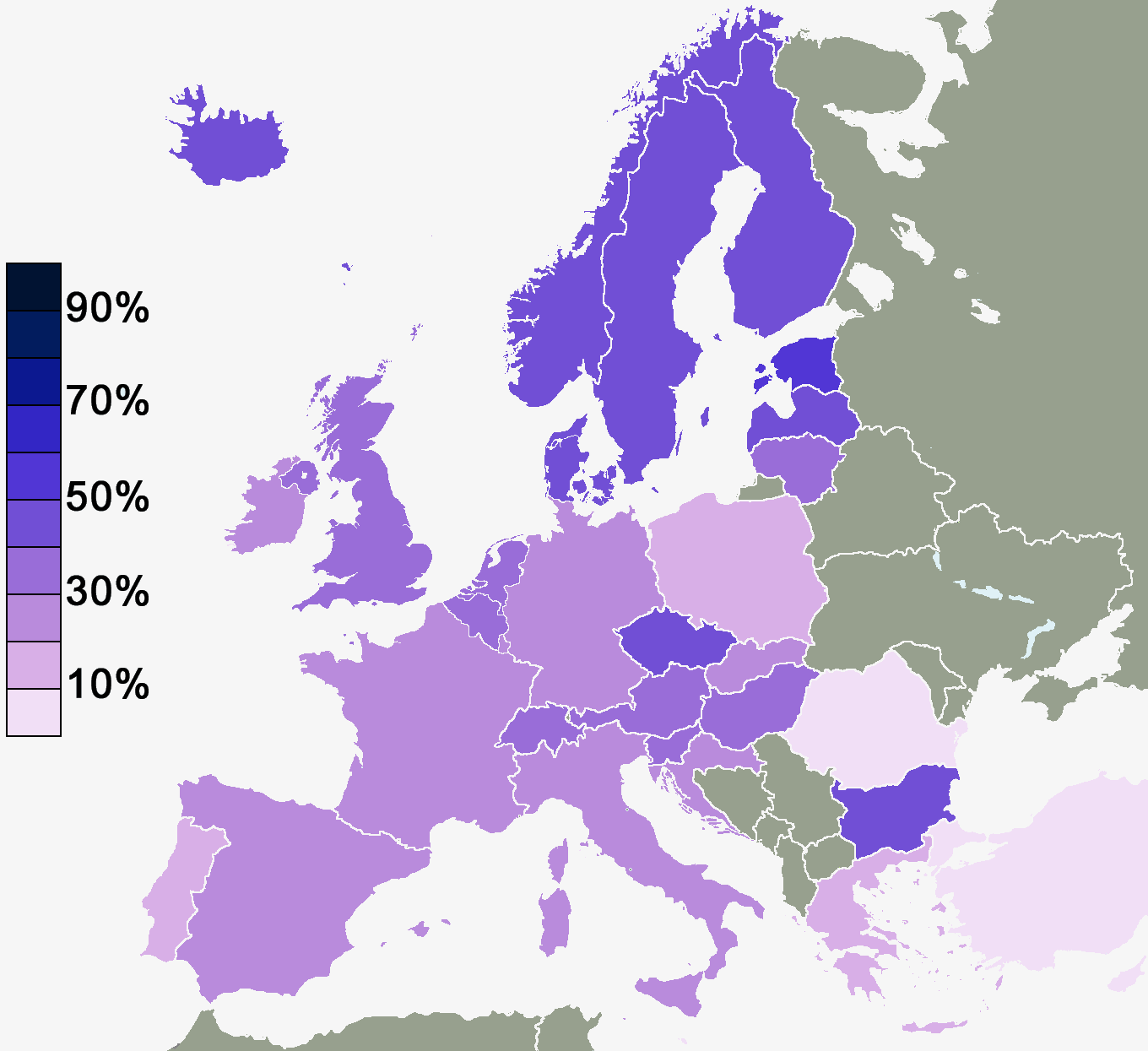
Percentages of people in European countries with a belief in some sort of spirit or life force (Eurobarometer 2010)

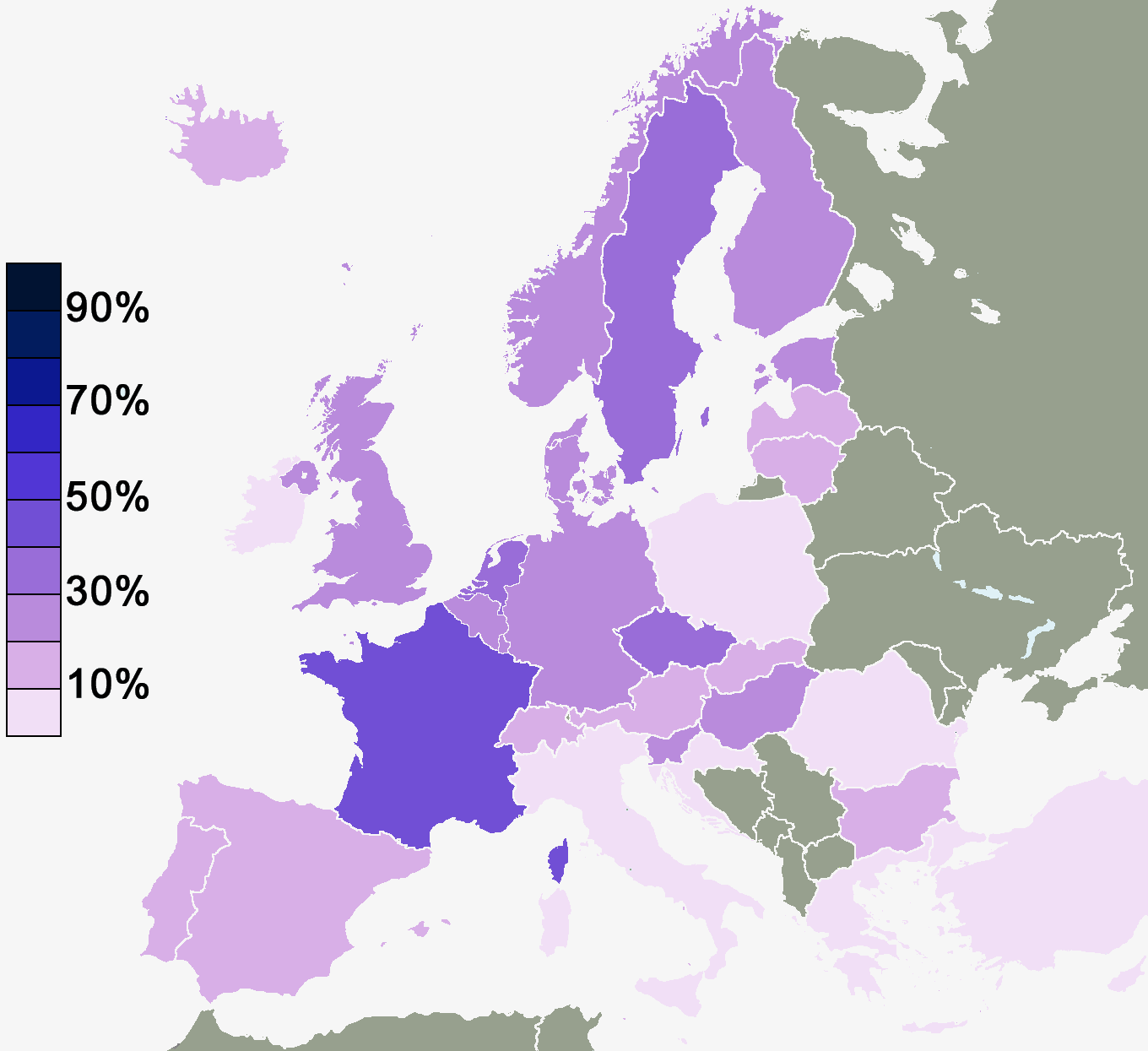
Percentages of people in European countries with no belief in any sort of spirit, god, or life force (Eurobarometer 2010)

According to a 2010 Eurostat Eurobarometer Poll, 51% of European Union citizens responded that "they believe there is a God", whereas 26% answered that "they believe there is some sort of spirit or life force" and 20% said that "they don't believe there is any sort of spirit, God, or life force" and results were widely varied between different countries.

According to another Poll about religiosity in the European Union in 2012 by Eurobarometer 16% are Non-believers/Agnostics and 7% are Atheists. 72% of EU citizens are Christians and 2% are Muslims. In 2017, the WIN-Gallup International Association (WIN/GIA) poll found China and Sweden as the top two countries with highest percentage of those who claim themselves atheist or irreligious.

Eurobarometer Poll 2010
| Country | "I believe there is a God" | "I believe there is some sort of spirit or life force" | "I don't believe there is any sort of spirit, God or life force" |
|---|---|---|---|
| Malta | 94% | 4% | 2% |
| Romania | 92% | 7% | 1% |
| Cyprus | 88% | 8% | 3% |
| Greece | 79% | 16% | 4% |
| Poland | 79% | 14% | 5% |
| Italy | 74% | 20% | 6% |
| (Republic of Ireland) Ireland | 70% | 20% | 7% |
| Portugal | 70% | 15% | 12% |
| Slovakia | 63% | 23% | 13% |
| Spain | 59% | 20% | 19% |
| Lithuania | 47% | 37% | 12% |
| Luxembourg | 46% | 22% | 24% |
| Hungary | 45% | 34% | 20% |
| Austria | 44% | 38% | 12% |
| Germany | 44% | 25% | 27% |
| Latvia | 38% | 48% | 11% |
| United Kingdom | 37% | 33% | 25% |
| Belgium | 37% | 31% | 27% |
| Bulgaria | 36% | 43% | 15% |
| Finland | 33% | 42% | 22% |
| Slovenia | 32% | 36% | 26% |
| Denmark | 28% | 47% | 24% |
| Netherlands | 28% | 39% | 30% |
| France | 27% | 27% | 40% |
| Estonia | 18% | 50% | 29% |
| Sweden | 18% | 45% | 34% |
| Czech Republic | 16% | 44% | 37% |
| (European Union) EU27 | 51% | 26% | 20% |
| Turkey (EU candidate) | 97% | 2% | 1% |
| Croatia (joined EU in 2013) | 69% | 22% | 7% |
| Switzerland (EFTA) | 44% | 39% | 11% |
| Iceland (EEA, not EU) | 31% | 49% | 18% |
| Norway (EEA, not EU) | 22% | 44% | 29% |

Eurobarometer Poll 2012
| Country | "Atheist" | "Non believer/Agnostic" | "Atheist + Non believer/Agnostic" |
|---|---|---|---|
| Romania | 0% | 0% | 0% |
| Cyprus | 0% | 0% | 0% |
| Malta | 1% | 2% | 3% |
| Bulgaria | 1% | 2% | 3% |
| Greece | 2% | 1% | 3% |
| Poland | 2% | 3% | 5% |
| Italy | 2% | 4% | 6% |
| (Republic of Ireland) Ireland | 2% | 5% | 7% |
| Portugal | 2% | 5% | 7% |
| Lithuania | 2% | 6% | 8% |
| Slovakia | 7% | 12% | 19% |
| Spain | 10% | 16% | 26% |
| Luxembourg | 6% | 14% | 20% |
| Hungary | 1% | 21% | 22% |
| Austria | 1% | 10% | 11% |
| Germany | 9% | 18% | 27% |
| Latvia | 3% | 21% | 24% |
| United Kingdom | 5% | 27% | 32% |
| Belgium | 7% | 16% | 23% |
| Finland | 4% | 12% | 16% |
| Slovenia | 16% | 9% | 25% |
| Denmark | 9% | 16% | 25% |
| Netherlands | 8% | 41% | 49% |
| France | 16% | 21% | 37% |
| Estonia | 15% | 22% | 37% |
| Sweden | 13% | 30% | 43% |
| Czech Republic | 20% | 39% | 59% |
| (European Union) EU27 | 7% | 16% | 23% |

WIN-Gallup International Poll 2012–2014
| Country | "A convinced atheist" (2012) | "A convinced atheist" (2015) |
|---|---|---|
| Austria | 10% | 13% |
| Belgium | 8% | 18% |
| Bosnia and Herzegovina | 4% | 3% |
| Bulgaria | 2% | 3% |
| Czech Republic | 30% | 30% |
| Denmark | | 12% |
| Finland | 6% | 10% |
| France | 29% | 18% |
| Germany | 15% | 17% |
| Iceland | 10% | 14% |
| (Republic of Ireland) Ireland | 10% | 10% |
| Italy | 8% | 6% |
| Kosovo | | 1% |
| Latvia | | 9% |
| Lithuania | 1% | |
| Moldova | 5% | |
| Netherlands | 14% | 15% |
| North Macedonia | 1% | 2% |
| Poland | 5% | 2% |
| Portugal | | 9% |
| Romania | 1% | 1% |
| Russia | 6% | 5% |
| Serbia | 3% | 3% |
| Spain | 9% | 20% |
| Sweden | 8% | 17% |
| Switzerland | 9% | 12% |
| Ukraine | 3% | 7% |
| United Kingdom | | 13% |

Pew Research Poll 2015
| Country | Affiliated Orthodox, Catholic or Muslim (poll 1) | Unaffiliated (poll 1) | Other/DK/ref (poll 1)* | "Believe in God, absolutely certain" (poll 2)** | "Believe in God, fairly certain" (poll 2)** | "Believe in God not too/at all certain" (poll 2)** | "Do not believe in God" (Poll 2)** | Atheist (poll 3)*** | Agnostic (poll 3)*** | Nothing in particular (poll 3)*** |
|---|---|---|---|---|---|---|---|---|---|---|
| Armenia | 91 | 2 | 7 | 79 | 15 | 1 | 4 | 1 | | 1 |
| Georgia | 99 | <1 | 1 | 73 | 22 | 2 | 1 | | | <1 |
| Bosnia | 96 | 3 | 1 | 66 | 24 | 4 | 4 | 2 | 1 | |
| Romania | 91 | 1 | 8 | 64 | 28 | 2 | 4 | | | 1 |
| Greece | 92 | 4 | 4 | 59 | 26 | 7 | 6 | 3 | | 1 |
| Serbia | 94 | 4 | 1 | 58 | 26 | 3 | 10 | 2 | 1 | 1 |
| Croatia | 90 | 7 | 3 | 57 | 24 | 5 | 10 | 4 | 2 | 1 |
| Moldova | 92 | 2 | 6 | 55 | 35 | 5 | 3 | 1 | | 1 |
| Poland | 88 | 7 | 5 | 45 | 35 | 5 | 8 | 2 | 1 | 4 |
| Lithuania | 78 | 6 | 17 | 34 | 34 | 7 | 11 | 2 | | 4 |
| Ukraine | 88 | 7 | 5 | 32 | 45 | 6 | 9 | 3 | | 4 |
| Bulgaria | 91 | 5 | 4 | 30 | 40 | 7 | 17 | 2 | 1 | 2 |
| Latvia | 54 | 21 | 25 | 28 | 34 | 7 | 15 | 3 | | 18 |
| Belarus | 86 | 3 | 11 | 26 | 47 | 11 | 9 | 2 | | 1 |
| Hungary | 57 | 21 | 22 | 26 | 26 | 7 | 30 | 5 | | 16 |
| Russia | 81 | 15 | 4 | 25 | 38 | 10 | 15 | 4 | 1 | 10 |
| Czech Republic | 22 | 72 | 6 | 13 | 13 | 3 | 66 | 25 | 1 | 46 |
| Estonia | 26 | 45 | 29 | 13 | 24 | 7 | 45 | 9 | 1 | 35 |

(*) 13% of respondents in Hungary identify as Presbyterian. In Estonia and Latvia, 20% and 19%, respectively, identify as Lutherans. And in Lithuania, 14% say they are "just a Christian" and do not specify a particular denomination. They are included in the "other” category.
(**) Identified as "don't know/refused" from the "other/idk/ref" column are excluded from this statistic.
(***) Figures may not add to subtotals due to rounding.

Eurobarometer survey 2015 – Religious affiliation in the EU
| Region | Catholic | Orthodox | Protestant | Other Christian | Total Christians | Non-Believer / Agnostic | Atheist | Muslim |
|---|---|---|---|---|---|---|---|---|
| Austria | 66.5% | 2.2% | 7.2% | 1.9% | 77.8% | 15.4% | 4.1% | 1.5% |
| Belgium | 52.9% | 1.6% | 2.1% | 4.1% | 60.7% | 17.1% | 14.9% | 5.2% |
| Bulgaria | 1.6% | 83.3% | 0.1% | 0.8% | 85.8% | 3.3% | 2.3% | 7.7% |
| Cyprus | 1.3% | 96.3% | 0.0% | 0.8% | 98.4% | 1.1% | 0.5% | 0.0% |
| Croatia | 84.2% | 2.3% | 0.2% | 0.0% | 86.7% | 6.6% | 3.6% | 1.3% |
| Czech Republic | 27.1% | 0.2% | 1.0% | 3.2% | 31.5% | 38.6% | 25.8% | 0.0% |
| Denmark | 1.2% | 2.2% | 60.0% | 8.8% | 72.2% | 12.5% | 13.2% | 0.8% |
| Estonia | 2.8% | 23.2% | 9.0% | 23.6% | 58.6% | 16.6% | 22.2% | 0.2% |
| Finland | 0.1% | 2.0% | 69.7% | 7.4% | 79.2% | 12.7% | 6.5% | 0.5% |
| France | 47.8% | 0.6% | 1.8% | 4.1% | 54.3% | 17.6% | 22.8% | 3.3% |
| Western Germany | 37.1% | 0.6% | 36.5% | 7.2% | 81.4% | 6.7% | 7.4% | 2.8% |
| Eastern Germany | 7.1% | 2.1% | 19.2% | 8.8% | 37.2% | 27.0% | 34.1% | 0.0% |
| Total Germany | 31.1% | 0.9% | 33.1% | 7.5% | 72.6% | 10.7% | 12.8% | 2.2% |
| Greece | 0.4% | 92.9% | 0.1% | 1.0% | 94.4% | 1.9% | 1.6% | 1.2% |
| Hungary | 60.3% | 1.1% | 5.1% | 8.1% | 74.6% | 18.5% | 2.7% | 0.3% |
| (Republic of Ireland) Ireland | 80.7% | 0.7% | 1.8% | 4.3% | 87.5% | 5.8% | 4.6% | 0.8% |
| Italy | 77.8% | 4.9% | 0.6% | 1.3% | 84.6% | 8.1% | 4.3% | 0.1% |
| Latvia | 26.2% | 24.0% | 16.6% | 9.9% | 76.7% | 17.3% | 4.7% | 1.2% |
| Lithuania | 87.7% | 3.6% | 0.5% | 0.9% | 92.7% | 4.2% | 2.6% | 0.0% |
| Luxembourg | 64.8% | 3.5% | 3.6% | 0.7% | 69.8% | 11.2% | 10.3% | 2.1% |
| Malta | 95.0% | 0.3% | 0.2% | 0.4% | 95.9% | 1.1% | 3.0% | 0.0% |
| Netherlands | 21.9% | 1.9% | 17.8% | 6.2% | 47.8% | 39.6% | 9.2% | 1.4% |
| Poland | 90.7% | 0.2% | 1.0% | 0.4% | 92.3% | 2.2% | 3.6% | 0.2% |
| Portugal | 85.8% | 0.2% | 1.1% | 1.6% | 88.7% | 8.2% | 2.3% | 0.1% |
| Romania | 5.3% | 89.9% | 3.4% | 1.0% | 99.6% | 0.2% | 0.1% | 0.1% |
| Slovakia | 73.1% | 2.2% | 6.2% | 2.2% | 83.7% | 5.0% | 7.4% | 0.0% |
| Slovenia | 66.6% | 0.9% | 1.5% | 0.2% | 69.2% | 6.6% | 16.5% | 2.7% |
| Spain | 64.2% | 1.4% | 0.8% | 2.2% | 68.6% | 17.0% | 10.9% | 0.6% |
| Sweden | 1.6% | 0.9% | 36.5% | 8.6% | 47.6% | 31.0% | 19.0% | 1.2% |
| (United Kingdom) Great Britain | 12.7% | 9.6% | 14.7% | 19.2% | 56.2% | 20.6% | 11.8% | 4.7% |
| (United Kingdom) Northern Ireland | 33.3% | 1.3% | 14.7% | 42.4% | 91.7% | 7.6% | 2.4% | 0.7% |
| (European Union) EU28 | 45.3% | 9.6% | 11.1% | 5.6% | 71.6% | 13.6% | 10.4% | 1.8% |

==== Albania ====
The 2011 Albanian census found 2.5% of Albania were atheists.

==== Austria ====
An Austrian Gallup Institute survey, commissioned by WIN-Gallup International, conducted on November 2014, found that 13% of Austria were "convinced atheists."

==== Belarus ====
A Pew Research Center poll, conducted from June 2015 to July 2016, found that 2% of Belarus were atheists, while 9% stated that they "Do not believe in God".

==== Belgium ====
A iVOX bvba survey, commissioned by WIN-Gallup International, conducted from 28 October 2014 to 18 November 2014, found that 18% of Belgium were "convinced atheists."

==== Bosnia and Herzegovina ====
A Pew Research Center poll, conducted from June 2015 to July 2016, found that 2% of Bosnia and Herzegovina were atheists, while 4% stated that they "Do not believe in God".

==== Bulgaria ====
A Pew Research Center poll, conducted from June 2015 to July 2016, found that 2% of Bulgaria were atheists, while 17% stated that they "Do not believe in God".

==== Croatia ====
A Pew Research Center poll, conducted from June 2015 to July 2016, found that 4% of Croatia were atheists, while 10% stated that they "Do not believe in God".

==== Cyprus ====
A 2010 Eurobarometer poll found that 3% of the Cyprus stated that "I don't believe there is any sort of spirit, God or life force".

==== Czech Republic ====
A Pew Research Center poll, conducted from June 2015 to July 2016, found that 25% of the Czech Republic were atheists, while 66% stated that they "Do not believe in God".

==== Denmark ====
A DMA/Research survey, commissioned by WIN-Gallup International, conducted on November 2014, found that 12% of Denmark were "convinced atheists."

==== Estonia ====
A Pew Research Center poll, conducted from June 2015 to July 2016, found that 9% of Estonian population were atheists, while 45% stated that they "Do not believe in God".

==== Finland ====
A Taloustutkimus Oy survey, commissioned by WIN-Gallup International, conducted from 19 October 2014 to 7 November 2014, found that 10% of Finland were "convinced atheists."

==== France ====
A BVA survey, commissioned by WIN-Gallup International, conducted from 20 October 2014 to 23 October 2014, found that 10% of France were "convinced atheists."

==== Germany ====
A Produkt + Markt survey, commissioned by WIN-Gallup International, conducted on November 2014, found that 17% of Germany were "convinced atheists."

==== Greece ====
A Pew Research Center poll, conducted from June 2015 to July 2016, found that 3% of Greece were atheists, while 6% stated that they "Do not believe in God". According to other sources 14.7% of Greeks are atheists.

==== Hungary ====
A Pew Research Center poll, conducted from June 2015 to July 2016, found that 5% of Hungary were atheists, while 30% stated that they "Do not believe in God".

==== Iceland ====
A Capacent Gallup survey, commissioned by WIN-Gallup International, conducted from 29 October 2014 to 12 November 2014, found that 14% of Iceland were "convinced atheists."

==== Ireland ====
A Red C Research and Marketing survey, commissioned by WIN-Gallup International, conducted from 20 October 2014 to 27 October 2014, found that 10% of Ireland were "convinced atheists."

==== Italy ====
A 2019 survey conducted by DOXA found that 9% of Italian citizens were atheists and 6.3 were agnostics.

==== Kosovo ====
A Be Research (Index Kosova) survey, commissioned by WIN-Gallup International, conducted from 1 November 2014, to 7 November 2014 found that 1% of Kosovo were "convinced atheists."

==== Latvia ====
A Pew Research Center poll, conducted from June 2015 to July 2016, found that 3% of Latvia were atheists, while 15% stated that they "Do not believe in God".

==== Lithuania ====
A Pew Research Center poll, conducted from June 2015 to July 2016, found that 2% of Lithuania were atheists, while 11% stated that they "Do not believe in God".

==== Luxembourg ====
A 2010 Eurobarometer poll found that 24% of the Luxembourg stated that "I don't believe there is any sort of spirit, God or life force". A 2012 Eurobarometer poll found that only 6% of the Luxembourg were "convinced atheists."

==== Malta ====
A 2010 Eurobarometer poll found that 2% of the Malta stated that "I don't believe there is any sort of spirit, God or life force".

==== Moldova ====
A Pew Research Center poll, conducted from June 2015 to July 2016, found that 1% of Moldova were atheists, while 3% stated that they "Do not believe in God".

==== Montenegro ====
According to the 2011 Montenegro census found 1.24% of Montenegro were atheists.

==== Netherlands ====
According to Statistics Netherlands in September 2018, 51% of the Dutch population is irreligious.

==== North Macedonia ====
A BRIMA survey, commissioned by WIN-Gallup International, conducted from 1 November 2014 to 24 November 2014, found that 2% of the people of North Macedonia were "convinced atheists."

==== Norway ====
A 2010 Eurobarometer poll found that 29% of the Norway stated that "I don't believe there is any sort of spirit, God or life force".

A deeper analysis of the 2010 Eurobarometer poll found that 9% of the Norway were atheists.

==== Poland ====
A Pew Research Center poll, conducted from June 2015 to July 2016, found that 2% of Poland were atheists, while 8% stated that they "Do not believe in God".

==== Romania ====
A Pew Research Center poll, conducted from June 2015 to July 2016, found that 4% of Romania stated that they "Do not believe in God".

==== Russia ====
A Pew Research Center poll, conducted from June 2015 to July 2016, found that 4% of Russia were atheists, while 15% stated that they "Do not believe in God".

==== Slovakia ====
A 2010 Eurobarometer poll found that 13% of the Slovakia stated that "I don't believe there is any sort of spirit, God or life force".

==== Slovenia ====
A 2010 Eurobarometer poll found that 26% of the Slovenia stated that "I don't believe there is any sort of spirit, God or life force".

==== Spain ====
According to the CIA World Factbook, 16.2% of Spain are atheists.

==== Serbia ====
A Pew Research Center poll, conducted from June 2015 to July 2016, found that 2% of Serbia were atheists, while 10% stated that they "Do not believe in God".

==== Sweden ====
A CMA Research survey, commissioned by WIN-Gallup International, conducted from 20 October 2014 to 31 November 2014, found that 17% of Sweden were "convinced atheists." A Gallup Poll in 2016 reported that 18% of Swedes self report as atheist and 55% as non-religious.Gallup Pakistan – Pakistan's Foremost Research Lab

==== Switzerland ====
A Leger Switzerland survey, commissioned by WIN-Gallup International, conducted from 29 October 2014 to 9 November 2014, found that 12% of Switzerland were "convinced atheists."

==== Ukraine ====
A Pew Research Center poll, conducted from June 2015 to July 2016, found that 3% of Ukraine were atheists, while 9% stated that they "Do not believe in God".

==== United Kingdom ====
A ORB International survey, commissioned by WIN-Gallup International, conducted from 19 November 2014 to 28 November 2014, found that 13% of the United Kingdom were "convinced atheists."

=== North America ===
==== Canada ====
A Leger survey, commissioned by WIN-Gallup International, conducted in November 2014, found that 12% of Canada were "convinced atheists."

==== Cuba ====
According to Barrett et al. (2001), 7% of Cuba were atheist.

==== Dominican Republic ====
According to Inglehart et al. (2004), 7% of those in the Dominican Republic do not believe in God.

==== Mexico ====
A BRAIN Research survey, commissioned by WIN-Gallup International, conducted from 27 October 2014, to 7 November 2014 found that 4% of Mexico were "convinced atheists."

According to the 2020 federal census, 8.1% of Mexico's population is irreligious, almost double the percentage registered in the 2010 census.

==== Panama ====
A Dichter & Neira survey, commissioned by WIN-Gallup International, conducted from 16 October 2014 to 19 October 2014, found that 2% of Panamanians were "convinced atheists."

==== United States ====
Gallup Polling 1944–2022
| Year | "Do you believe in God?" |
| Year | No |
|---|---|
| 1944 | 1% |
| 1947 | 3% |
| 1953 | 1% |
| 1954 | 1% |
| 1965 | 2% |
| 1967 | 1% |
| 2011 | 7% |
| 2013 | 11% |
| 2014 | 11% |
| 2016 | 10% |
| 2017 | 12% |
| 2022 | 17% |

=== Oceania ===
==== Australia ====
A Colmar Brunton survey, commissioned by WIN-Gallup International, conducted from 4 November 2014, to 11 November 2014 found that 13% of Australia were "convinced atheists."

==== Fiji ====
A Tebbutt Research survey, commissioned by WIN-Gallup International, conducted from 1 November 2014, to 15 November 2014, found that 1% of the Fiji were "convinced atheists."

==== New Zealand ====
The International Social Survey Programme was conducted by Massey University in 2008 found 13% of New Zealand were atheists.

==== Papua New Guinea ====
A Tebbutt Research survey, commissioned by WIN-Gallup International, conducted from 1 November 2014 to 15 November 2014, found that 0.41% of Papua New Guinea were "convinced atheists."

=== South America ===
==== Argentina ====
According to the CIA World Factbook, 6% of Argentina are atheists.

==== Brazil ====
An IBOPE Inteligência survey, commissioned by WIN-Gallup International, conducted from 13 November 2014, to 17 November 2014 found that 2% of Brazil were "convinced atheists."

==== Chile ====
According to Encuesta Nacional Bicentenario (2019), 10% of those in Chile do not believe in God.

==== Colombia ====
A Centro Nacional de Consultoría survey, commissioned by WIN-Gallup International, conducted from 1 November 2014, to 7 November 2014, found that 3% of the Colombia were "convinced atheists."

==== Ecuador ====
A CEDATOS survey, commissioned by WIN-Gallup International, conducted from 31 October 2014, to 20 November 2014, found that 2% of the Ecuador were "convinced atheists."

==== Peru ====
In a survey by WIN International, carried out with the support of Datum Internacional, 92% of Peruvians expressed their belief in God, while 72% said they considered themselves religious, 20% non-religious and only 3% declared themselves to be atheist.

==== Uruguay ====
According to a survey by Statista in 2018, 9% of Uruguay were atheists. However, the majority of Uruguayans do not adhere to any particular religion, and the country has a strong secular state. In 1837, civil marriage was recognized, and in 1861, the state took over the running of public cemeteries. In 1907, divorce was legalized, and in 1909, all religious instruction was banned from state schools.

== See also ==
- Desecularization
- Growth of religion
- Religiosity and education
