= Apagnosticism =

Apagnosticism (from Ancient Greek: ἀπάθεια - "apathy" + ἀγνωσία - "ignorance") is a philosophical position that combines elements of Agnosticism and Apatheism. Apagnosticism neither claims knowledge of the existence or non-existence of God (the stance of agnosticism) nor considers the question to have a meaningful influence on one's life or beliefs (the stance of apatheism). Unlike traditional religious, atheist, or theistic perspectives, apagnosticism refrains from active exploration or proof of God's existence and is based on respect for religious beliefs of others without personal adherence.

Apagnostics typically lean toward non-belief in God, while remaining neutral on religious questions, not entirely ruling out the possibility of a deity's existence. This approach allows for a respectful, tolerant perspective toward the practices and beliefs of others, finding value in cultural and historical aspects of religions without a personal commitment to them.

== Connection with agnosticism and apatheism ==
Apagnosticism develops the ideas of agnosticism, which asserts the impossibility of reliable knowledge about God, and apatheism, which expresses indifference to religious issues. Unlike atheists, apagnostics avoid actively asserting the position that there is no God, and unlike agnostics, apagnostics do not attach significant importance to religious issues, considering them irrelevant to their lives.

== Etymology ==
The term apagnosticism derives from two Greek roots: ἀπάθεια (apatheia) meaning "apathy" or "indifference," and ἀγνωσία (agnosia) meaning "ignorance" or "unknowing." This combination reflects a worldview that integrates apatheistic indifference toward religious inquiries with agnostic skepticism about the knowability of a divine or supernatural realm. Apagnosticism suggests a perspective in which religious and metaphysical questions hold no significant relevance in one's personal outlook, and neither affirmative nor negative stances on the divine are considered impactful.

== Attitude towards religion ==
Apagnostics approach religion with respect, acknowledging its cultural, historical, and social significance without a personal stance toward religious doctrines and rituals. In contrast to atheists, who may deny the existence of a deity outright, apagnostics maintain an uninvested stance, viewing the topic as non-essential to their worldview. However, apagnostics support tolerance of various beliefs, allowing for a neutral position that respects others' choices without engaging in religious or anti-religious debates.
