= Agnostic atheism =

Position combining atheism and agnosticism

Agnostic atheism, also called atheistic agnosticism, is a position combining atheism with agnosticism. In this usage, an agnostic atheist does not believe that any deity exists but does not claim to know that no deity exists, or holds that the existence or nonexistence of deities is unknown or unknowable.

The relationship between the terms depends on how atheism and agnosticism are defined. Atheism may refer broadly to the absence of theistic belief, but in philosophy of religion it is often used more narrowly for the proposition that God does not exist. Agnosticism may refer to suspension of judgment, or to the epistemological view that neither theism nor atheism is known. Under the broader belief-and-knowledge distinction, agnosticism can be either atheistic or theistic because atheism and theism concern belief, while agnosticism concerns knowledge. Under narrower philosophical definitions, however, atheism and agnosticism may be treated as distinct or mutually exclusive positions.

The relationship has been discussed in different terms by writers including Robert G. Ingersoll, Robert Flint, Bertrand Russell, Antony Flew, George H. Smith, and Richard Dawkins. Writers have approached it through frameworks including standards of proof, negative and positive atheism, and probabilistic degrees of belief.

Agnostic atheism may be contrasted with agnostic theism, the view that one or more deities exist while their existence or nonexistence is unknown or cannot be known.

== Definition ==
Agnostic atheism combines a negative or non-affirming form of atheism with an agnostic position about knowledge. In this usage, atheism refers to the absence of belief that any deity exists, while agnosticism refers to the view that the existence or nonexistence of deities is not known, cannot be known, or has not been established.

The compatibility of atheism and agnosticism depends on the definitions being used. On the broader belief-and-knowledge distinction, a person may lack theistic belief while also denying knowledge or suspending judgment. On narrower philosophical definitions, atheism and agnosticism may instead be treated as distinct positions.

== History ==
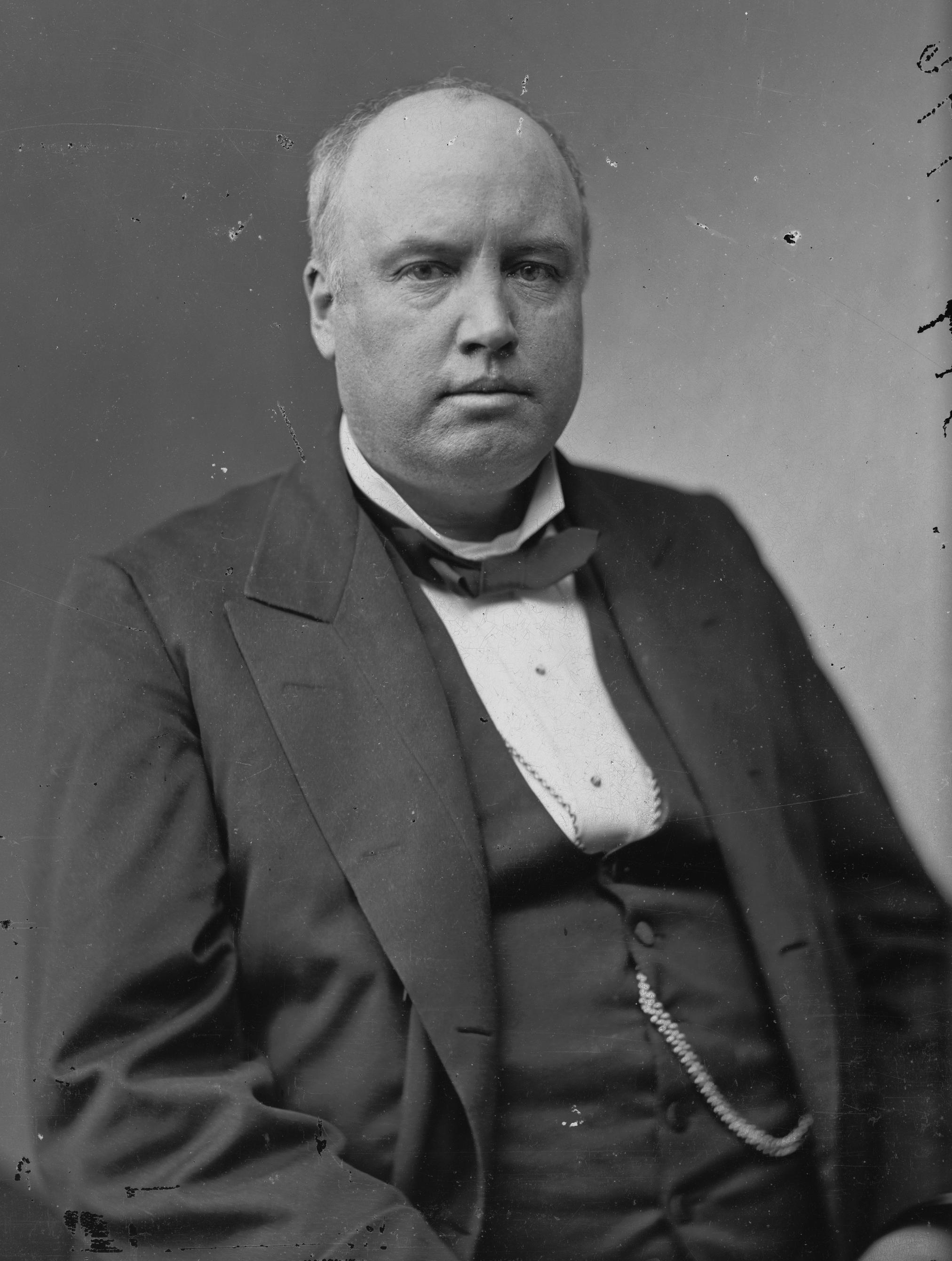
Robert G. Ingersoll, an American freethought lecturer who described agnosticism and atheism as overlapping positions

The historical background of agnostic atheism lies in the distinction between disbelief and claims to knowledge. The term agnosticism was introduced by Thomas Henry Huxley in the nineteenth century to describe an epistemological attitude toward claims that were not, in his view, demonstrated or demonstrable. Later writers applied this distinction to atheism, treating atheism as concerning belief and agnosticism as concerning knowledge.

American freethinker Robert G. Ingersoll, often called "The Great Agnostic", presented atheism and agnosticism as overlapping rather than mutually exclusive. In 1885, Ingersoll stated that the agnostic says, "I do not know, but I do not believe there is any God", and that the atheist says the same. The statement illustrates an early formulation of the distinction between not believing in God and claiming knowledge that God does not exist.

Scottish theologian and philosopher Robert Flint used the expressions "agnostic atheism" and "atheistic agnosticism" in his Croall Lecture for 1887–88, later published as Agnosticism. Flint argued that atheism and agnosticism should not be treated as necessarily exclusive positions. In Flint's account, a person who finds no adequate reason to believe in God may be described as an atheist, while a person who also holds that God's existence cannot be known or proved may be described as both an agnostic and an atheist.

In 1949, Bertrand Russell discussed the difficulty of choosing between the labels atheist and agnostic in his essay "Am I an Atheist or an Agnostic?" Russell treated the distinction partly as a matter of context and standards of proof, suggesting that a person might use agnostic in a strictly philosophical sense while using atheist in ordinary contexts where familiar theistic claims were at issue.

In 1972, Antony Flew argued in "The Presumption of Atheism" for using atheism in a negative sense unless sufficient reason had been given for belief in God. Flew's argument gave a prominent philosophical formulation to the distinction between merely not accepting theism and positively asserting that God does not exist, a distinction later used in discussions of negative and positive atheism.

In 1974, George H. Smith restated the belief-and-knowledge distinction in explicitly atheistic terms. Smith argued that theism and atheism refer to the presence or absence of belief in a god, while agnosticism concerns knowledge; on this account, agnosticism is not a third alternative to theism and atheism, but may be either theistic or atheistic.

Later atheist writing also used probabilistic rather than strictly binary classifications. In The God Delusion (2006), Richard Dawkins presented a seven-point scale of theistic probability, ranging from strong theism to strong atheism. His sixth category, "de facto atheist", describes a person who does not claim certainty but regards God's existence as very improbable and lives on the assumption that God does not exist. The scale illustrates a modern formulation of an atheistic position that falls short of a claim to certain knowledge.

Timeline of selected intellectual developments relevant to the classification of atheism and agnosticism. The sequence does not imply a direct intellectual lineage.

== Classification ==
Under classifications that distinguish belief from knowledge, agnostic atheism combines the absence of theistic belief with an agnostic position concerning knowledge. In the terminology used by George H. Smith, theism and atheism concern the presence or absence of belief in a god, while agnosticism concerns knowledge; agnosticism may therefore be either theistic or atheistic. Under this classification, agnostic atheism is the atheistic form of agnosticism, while agnostic theism is the corresponding theistic form.

Schematic comparison of several classifications relevant to agnostic atheism.

The classification depends partly on the definition of atheism being used. Under a broad psychological definition, atheism is the absence of belief that a god or gods exist; Stephen Bullivant, for example, adopts this definition as an umbrella category encompassing positive and negative forms of atheism. In taxonomies that distinguish negative and positive atheism, negative atheism involves the absence of theistic belief, while positive atheism additionally affirms that God or gods do not exist.

In much philosophy of religion, however, atheism is used propositionally for the position that God does not exist. On this usage, a person who has considered the question but believes neither that God exists nor that God does not exist is ordinarily classified as an agnostic rather than an atheist. The same underlying attitude may therefore receive different labels under broad psychological and narrower propositional taxonomies.

Agnosticism itself can also refer to different positions. Draper distinguishes psychological agnosticism, understood as suspension of judgment concerning whether God exists, from epistemological agnosticism concerning whether theism or atheism is known; these positions need not coincide. Accounts of agnosticism also distinguish weaker positions concerning the absence of knowledge from stronger claims that the existence or nonexistence of God cannot be known.

Some philosophers further distinguish agnostics from people who merely lack the concept of a deity or have never considered the question. Graham Oppy, for example, distinguishes agnostics from "innocents", who neither believe that there are gods nor believe that there are no gods because they have not considered, or cannot consider, the question of whether gods exist. Oppy's distinction therefore separates agnosticism from cases in which the absence of theistic belief results from never having considered, or being unable to consider, the question.

== Arguments and rationale ==
Agnostic atheism is commonly justified by an evidential or epistemic standard for belief. On this view, a person may withhold belief in deities because the available evidence is judged insufficient, while also declining to claim that no deities exist or that their nonexistence is known. Contemporary philosophical treatments of agnosticism have examined suspension of judgment in relation to evidentialism and the ambiguity of evidence for and against religious belief. The position therefore rejects theistic belief without necessarily adopting the stronger claim associated with positive atheism.

A related rationale concerns the burden of proof. In "The Presumption of Atheism", Antony Flew argued that atheism should be understood negatively unless sufficient reason has been given for belief in God. This approach supports a distinction between not accepting theism and affirming that God or gods do not exist, a distinction also used in discussions of negative and positive atheism. Agnostic atheism fits most naturally with this negative sense of atheism, although philosophers who reserve atheism for the proposition that God does not exist may instead classify such a position as agnosticism.

Related positions include ignosticism and theological noncognitivism, which question whether the term "God" or statements about God have sufficient cognitive content to be judged true or false. Theological noncognitivism differs from ordinary cognitivist approaches to atheism in denying that claims about God express propositions capable of being true or false. A. J. Ayer, for example, argued that statements about God were not genuine propositions.

== Contemporary self-identification ==
Philosophical classifications of atheism and agnosticism do not always correspond closely to how people describe their own identities. In a 2026 study of 1,018 participants, psychologist Luke Galen found that agnostic identification was comparatively nonexclusive and that the beliefs of self-identified agnostics substantially overlapped with those of atheists. Twenty-two percent of the sample included agnostic among multiple self-identifications, while 11% identified exclusively as agnostic.

Galen also found that endorsement of the view that gods are unknowable did not unambiguously correspond to agnostic identification or clearly distinguish agnostics from atheists. More generally, research on survey methodology has found that questions permitting only a single religious or nonreligious identity can undercount multiple identifications. These findings illustrate the distinction between formal philosophical categories and atheist or agnostic labels used in self-description.

== Criticism and disputes over terminology ==
The term agnostic atheism is disputed because it depends on contested definitions of both atheism and agnosticism. Under the broad definition used by Smith and some other atheist writers, atheism concerns the absence of theistic belief, while agnosticism concerns knowledge; on that view, the two labels can be combined. Under the narrower propositional usage described by Draper, atheism is the proposition that God does not exist, while agnosticism is the suspension of judgment about that proposition. On that usage, a person who lacks theistic belief but does not affirm that God does not exist may instead be classified as an agnostic.

Some philosophers therefore prefer to reserve atheism for the proposition that God does not exist, rather than for every absence of theistic belief. Oppy argues that, in philosophical usage, atheism is best understood as the view that there are no gods, while agnosticism is distinct from both theism and atheism. This stricter usage conflicts with classifications that treat agnostic atheism as a straightforward combination of atheism and agnosticism.
