= Practical atheism =

Religious philosophy

Practical atheism is the view that one should live life without concern about a god, without rejecting or accepting claims about god(s). Practical atheism has an overlap with apatheism, which sees the god question as of little interest: this is not necessarily true of practical atheism. Since practical atheism doesn't address the god claim, one can be both a theist and a practical atheist.

== Forms ==
Philosopher Zofia Zdybicka lists four forms of practical atheism.

- Where one is not guided by religious principles
- Where one has a lack of interest in matters related to a god or gods
- Ignorance of the concept of a god
- Where one excludes a god or gods from intellectual pursuits and practical action at the individual or social level

== History ==
Historically, practical atheism was considered by some people to be associated with moral failure, willful ignorance, and impiety. Those considered practical atheists were said to behave as though God, ethics, and social responsibility did not exist.

According to the French Catholic philosopher Étienne Borne, "Practical atheism is not the denial of the existence of God, but complete godlessness of action; it is a moral evil, implying not the denial of the absolute validity of the moral law but simply rebellion against that law." In response to Voltaire, French philosopher Denis Diderot wrote: "It is very important not to mistake hemlock for parsley; but not at all so to believe or not in God."
