= Nontheist Quakers =

People who engage in Quaker practices but who do not believe in the supernatural

Nontheist Quakers (also known as nontheist Friends) are those who engage in Quaker practices and processes, but who do not necessarily believe in a theistic God or Supreme Being, the divine, the soul or the supernatural. Like traditional Quakers, also known as Friends, nontheist Friends are interested in realizing peace, simplicity, integrity, community, equality, and social justice in the Society of Friends and beyond.

== Beliefs ==
Quakers in the unprogrammed or "silent worship" tradition of Quaker practice began to examine the significance of nontheistic beliefs in the Society of Friends during the 20th century. Non-theism among Quakers probably dates to the 1930s, when some Quakers in California branched off to form the Humanist Society of Friends (today part of the American Humanist Association), and when Henry Cadbury professed agnosticism in a 1936 lecture to Harvard Divinity School students. In 1976, a Friends General Conference Gathering hosted a Workshop for Nontheistic Friends (Quakers).

A nontheist Friends' website and nontheist Quaker study groups exist. Os Cresson began a consideration of this issue from behaviorist, natural history, materialist and environmentalist perspectives. Roots and Flowers of Quaker Nontheism is one history. Nontheist Friends draw on Quaker humanist and universalist traditions. The book Godless for God's Sake: Nontheism in Contemporary Quakerism offers critical contributions by Quakers. Some Friends engage the implications of human evolution, cognitive anthropology, evolutionary psychology, bodymind questions (especially the "relaxation response"), primatology, evolutionary history, evolutionary biology, biology and consensus decision-making online, especially in terms of Quaker nontheism.

There are three main nontheist Quakers' websites, including the Nontheist Friends' Official Website, Nontheist Friends Network Website (a listed informal group of Britain Yearly Meeting), and the Nontheist Friends' wiki subject/school at World University and School, which was founded by Scott MacLeod.

== Statistics ==
The exact number of nontheist Quakers is currently unknown. According to a 1996 survey, 72% of British Quakers believed in God. However, a 2013 survey found that 15% of Quakers in Britain did not believe in God, up from 3% in 1990. One study of Friends in the Britain Yearly Meeting, some 30% of British Quakers had views described as non-theistic, agnostic, or atheist. These surveys should not be seen as representative of the global Quaker population which is majority Evangelistic (Gurneyite).

== Books ==
- Boulton, David (Ed). 2006. Godless for God's Sake – Nontheism in Contemporary Quakerism. Nontheist Friends.
- Cresson, Os, and David Boulton (Foreword). 2014. Quaker and Naturalist Too. Morning Walk Press.

== Notable nontheist Friends ==
- Piers Anthony
- Henry Cadbury
- Carla Denyer
- Ruth Cadbury
- Kersey Graves
- Sharman Apt Russell
- Nicholson Baker
- Charlie Brooker

== See also ==
- American Friends Service Committee
- Christian atheism
- Friends Committee on National Legislation
- Nontheistic religion
- Sea of Faith
