= Ietsism =

Unspecified belief in an undetermined transcendent reality

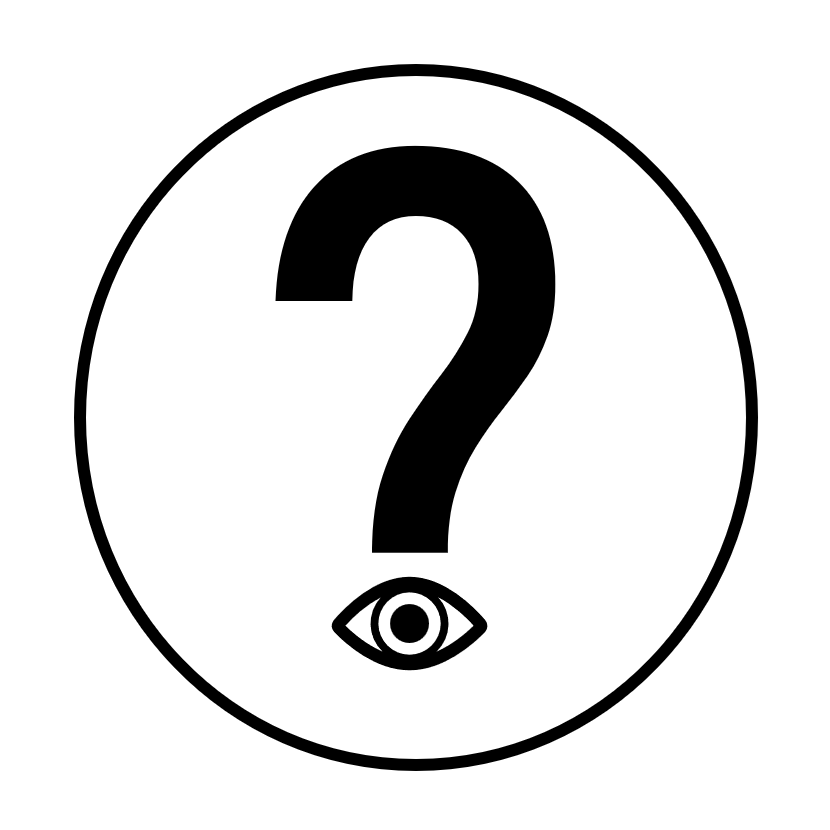
Symbol of Ietsism

Ietsism (Dutch: ietsisme, pronounced [itsˈɪsmə], literally 'somethingism') is the belief that there is "something" that exists beyond the material realm. As a vague belief in supernatural or mystical forces, its core lies in rejecting specific religious definitions and emphasizing personal, intuitive experiences of the spiritual dimension. This form of belief typically lacks a clear organization or doctrine, thus making it difficult to produce influential figures, like traditional religions.

It can be seen as an unspecified belief in an undetermined transcendent reality. It is a Dutch term for a range of beliefs held by people who, on the one hand, inwardly suspect – or indeed believe – that "there must be something undefined beyond the mundane which may or may not be possible to be known or proven", but on the other hand do not accept or subscribe to an established view of the nature of a deity offered by any particular religion. Some related terms in English are agnostic theism (though many ietsists do not accept – or have more subtle beliefs about – the conventional conception of "God", and therefore are characterized as agnostic atheists), advocates of eclecticism, the perennial philosophy, deists, minimal religion or "poor faith" ("bednaia vera" in Russian), or those who are spiritual but not religious.

Ietsists might call themselves Christians or followers of another religion based on cultural identification with that religion, without believing the teachings of that particular religion.

== Etymology ==
The name derives from the Dutch equivalent of the question: "Do you believe in (the conventional 'Christian') God?" A typical ietsist answer being "No, but there must be something", "something" being iets in Dutch.

The atheist political columnist and molecular biologist Ronald Plasterk (who later served as the Dutch Minister of Education, Culture and Science and Minister of the Interior and Kingdom Relations) published a piece in 1997 in the magazine Intermediair in which he used the word. The term became widely known in the Netherlands after Plasterk used it in a feature for the television programme Buitenhof. In October 2005, the word ietsisme was included in the 14th edition of the Dutch Language Dictionary Dikke Van Dale.

Around the year 2012, the word began to circulate among English speakers as a loanword. More recently, the word ietsers ("somethingers") has emerged in the Netherlands to describe people of this viewpoint, but this has not yet been widely borrowed into English.

The term ietsism is becoming more widely used in Europe, as opposed to the phrase 'spiritual but not religious' which prevails in North America.

== Beliefs ==
Ietsism may roughly be described as a belief in an end-in-itself or similar concept, without further assumption as to exactly what object or objects have such a property, like intrinsic aliquidism without further specification. Other aliquidistic lifestances include acceptance of "there is something" – that is, some meaning of life, something that is an end-in-itself or something more to existence, with this meaning assuming various objects or truths – while ietsism, on the other hand, simply accepts "there is something", without further specifications, details, or assumptions.

In contrast to traditional agnostics who often hold a skeptical view about gods or other metaphysical entities (i.e. "We can't or don't know for sure that there is a God"), ietsists take a viewpoint along the lines of, "And yet it 'feels' like there is something out there..." It is a form of religious liberalism or non-denominationalism. Ietsism may also be described as the minimal counterpart of nihilism, since it accepts that there is "something", and yet assumes as little as possible beyond this without further substantial evidence.

Within ietsism beliefs are very diverse, but all have in common that they are not classifiable under a traditional religion. Often concepts from different religions, folk beliefs, superstitions or ideologies are combined, but the ietsist does not feel that they belong to or believe in any particular religion. There is usually not a personal god who actively intervenes in the believer's life and an ietsist can be an atheist at the same time.

An opinion poll conducted by the Dutch daily newspaper Trouw in October 2004 indicated that some 40% of its readership felt broadly this way, and other Northern European countries would probably get similar rates. From a December 2014 survey by the Vrije Universiteit Amsterdam, it was concluded that the Dutch population has 27% ietsists, 31% agnostics, 25% atheists and 17% theists.

As ietsists cannot be neatly classified as religious or non-religious, ietsism is somewhat notorious for blighting statistics on religious demographics. Hence labeling ietsists as either religious or non-religious will tilt the demographic balance for those countries to either predominantly religious or predominantly non-religious.

== Symbol ==
The symbol of Ietsism is a question mark in a circle whose point forms the iris of the eye. Both the eye and the question mark refer to the invisible and unknown ‘something’.

== See also ==
- Deism
- Higher Power
- Ignosticism
- Irreligion
- List of English words of Dutch origin
- Moralistic therapeutic deism
- Religion in the Netherlands
- Spiritual but not religious
- Unknown God
