= Atheism: The Case Against God =

1974 book by George H. Smith

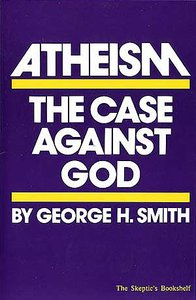
- Author: George H. Smith
- Language: English
- Subject: Atheism
- Publisher: Nash Publishing
- Publication date: 1974
- Publication place: United States
- Media type: Print (hardcover and paperback)
- Pages: 355
- ISBN: 0-8402-1115-5
- OCLC: 991343

Atheism: The Case Against God is a 1974 book by George H. Smith, in which the author argues against theism and for atheism.

== Summary ==
Smith says the purpose of the book is to show that belief in God is irrational:

It is not my purpose to convert people to atheism... (but to) demonstrate that the belief in God is irrational to the point of absurdity. If a person wishes to continue believing in a god, that is his prerogative, but he can no longer excuse his belief in the name of reason and moral necessity.

== Reception ==
The philosopher Michael Martin published a review in April 1982, stating that the book was "a hard hitting attack against belief" with "some limitations".

== See also ==
- The God Delusion
