= Incompatible-properties argument =

Idea that no description of God is consistent with reality

The incompatible-properties argument is the idea that no description of God is consistent with reality. For example, if one takes the definition of God to be described fully from the Bible, then the claims of what properties God has described therein might be argued to lead to a contradiction.

== Evil vs. good and omnipotence ==
The problem of evil is the argument that the existence of evil is incompatible with the concept of an omnipotent and perfectly good God.

A variation does not depend on the existence of evil. A truly omnipotent God could create all possible worlds. A "good" God can create only "good" worlds. A God that created all possible worlds would have no moral qualities whatsoever, and could be replaced by a random generator. The standard response is to argue a distinction between "could create" and "would create." In other words, God "could" create all possible worlds but that is simply not in God's nature. This has been argued by theologians for centuries. However, the result is that a "good" God is incompatible with some possible worlds, thus incapable of creating them without losing the property of being a totally different God. Yet, it is not necessary for God to be "good". He simply is good, but is capable of evil.

== Purpose vs. timelessness ==
One argument based on incompatible properties rests on a definition of God that includes a will, plan or purpose and an existence outside of time. To say that a being possesses a purpose implies an inclination or tendency to steer events toward some state that does not yet exist. This, in turn, implies a privileged direction, which we may call "time". It may be one direction of causality, the direction of increasing entropy, or some other emergent property of a world. These are not identical, but one must exist in order to progress toward a goal.

In general, God's time would not be related to our time. God might be able to operate within our time without being constrained to do so. However, God could then step outside this game for any purpose. Thus God's time must be aligned with our time if human activities are relevant to God's purpose. (In a relativistic universe, presumably this means—at any point in spacetime—time measured from t=0 at the Big Bang or end of inflation.)

A God existing outside of any sort of time could not create anything because creation substitutes one thing for another, or for nothing. Creation requires a creator that existed, by definition, prior to the thing created.

== Omniscience vs. indeterminacy or free will ==
Another pair of alleged incompatible properties is omniscience and either indeterminacy or free will. Omniscience concerning the past and present (properly defined relative to Earth) is not a problem, but there is an argument that omniscience regarding the future implies it has been determined, what seems possible only in a deterministic world.

== See also ==
- Existence of God
- Theological noncognitivism
