= Negative and positive atheism =

Types of atheism

Some varieties of atheism: on left / Implicit "negative" / "weak" / "soft" atheists who lack a belief in gods without explicitly denying the concept, includes very young children, those who are unacquainted with the concept or are truly undecided.; on right / Explicit "negative" / "weak" / "soft" atheists who do not believe that gods exist necessarily.; on right / Explicit "positive" / "strong" / "hard" atheists who firmly believe that gods do not exist.; Note: Areas in the diagram are not meant to indicate relative numbers of people.

Negative atheism, also called weak atheism and soft atheism, is any type of atheism where a person does not believe in the existence of any deities but does not necessarily explicitly assert that there are none. Positive atheism, also called strong atheism and hard atheism, is the form of atheism that additionally asserts that no deities exist.

The terms "negative atheism" and "positive atheism" were used by Antony Flew in 1976 and have appeared in George H. Smith's and Michael Martin's writings since 1990.

== Scope of application ==
Because of flexibility in the word god, it is possible that a person could be a positive/strong atheist in terms of certain conceptions of God, while remaining a negative/weak atheist in terms of others. For example, the God of classical theism is often considered to be a personal supreme deity who is omnipotent, omniscient, omnipresent, and omnibenevolent, caring about humans and human affairs. One might be a positive atheist for such a deity, while being a negative atheist with respect to a deistic conception of God by rejecting belief in such a deity but not explicitly asserting it to be false.

Positive and negative atheism are frequently used by the philosopher George H. Smith as synonyms of the less-well-known categories of implicit and explicit atheism, also relating to whether an individual holds a specific view that gods do not exist. "Positive" atheists explicitly assert that it is false that any deities exist. "Negative" atheists assert they do not believe any deities exist, but do not necessarily explicitly assert it is true that no deity exists. Those who do not believe any deities exist, but do not assert such non-belief, are included among implicit atheists. Among "implicit" atheists are thus included the following: children and adults who have never heard of deities; people who have heard of deities but have never given the idea any considerable thought; and those agnostics who suspend belief about deities, but do not reject such belief. All implicit atheists are included in the negative/weak categorization.

Under the negative atheism classification, agnostics are atheists. The validity of this categorization is disputed, however, and a few prominent atheists such as Richard Dawkins avoid it. In The God Delusion, Dawkins describes people for whom the probability of the existence of God is between "very high" and "very low" as "agnostic" and reserves the term "strong atheist" for those who claim to know there is no God. He categorizes himself as a "de facto atheist" but not a "strong atheist" on this scale. Within negative atheism, philosopher Anthony Kenny further distinguishes between agnostics, who find the claim "God exists" uncertain, and theological noncognitivists, who consider all talk of gods to be meaningless.

== Gnostic atheism ==
Gnostic atheism is distinct from strong atheism in an important and precise way. Strong atheism is the confident belief that no god exists — a position of conviction. Gnostic atheism, by contrast, is a rigorously elaborated knowledge claim: it does not merely assert disbelief but systematically refutes personhood as a viable cosmogonic principle, and demonstrates that the supernatural fails to meet the most basic ontological prerequisites by being fundamentally non-identificatory — that is, definable only by supernaturalist storytelling which doesn't elaborate deeply on its purported self-evident truths, and therefore without the logical identity required for anything to qualify as existentially real. This distinction places gnostic atheism closer to formal philosophy of mind and physics than to polemical irreligion.

The framework advances a physicalist rejection of theism that goes well beyond the conventional "lack of evidence" objection. Rather than resting on agnosticism or epistemic humility, it argues that supernatural agency — particularly the personal, thinking God of Abrahamic monotheism — is structurally and logically impossible given what we know about physics, information theory, and the nature of consciousness. The argument proceeds on several interlocking fronts. First, if God is a thinking being, then divine cognition must involve information processing, and Landauer's Principle establishes that such processing carries unavoidable thermodynamic costs — heat dissipation, energy expenditure — that would leave detectable physical traces in the universe, of which there are none. Attempts to rescue divine cognition through perfect reversible computing collapse under their own technical requirements, generating internal informational contradictions that undermine the theological premise of divine simplicity. Second, personhood — any personhood, human or divine — is a mereological complex: it is built from parts, from differentiated cognitive modalities, from memory, emotion, reasoning, and sensory integration. The God of classical theism is simultaneously claimed to be intellectually rich and mereologically simple, an indivisible monad. This is an internal contradiction that does not require external critique; theology cancels itself. Third, the framework attacks foundationalism directly: consciousness is an emergent property of complex physical subroutines, not a metaphysical ground. A personhood cannot be the first cause of the universe precisely because personhood is always already an end-product of prior information-processing systems — neurological, evolutionary, environmental. The supposed creator would require its own causal history, unraveling the entire theological architecture.

On the mathematical side, the framework challenges the Abrahamic theological fixation on unity and supremacy by noting that the von Neumann construction of natural numbers begins not with "one" but with the null set, and that no single axiomatic system enjoys absolute ontological status. Mathematical truths are conditional — valid within their framework, not metaphysically absolute — and logical pluralism undermines any claim that a singular supreme being occupies a privileged logical foundation. The "supernatural," defined negatively as what is not physical and not temporal, is characterized as atautotic: lacking a rigorous identity, and therefore failing the most basic criterion for existence in any logical framework. Free will and the soul are similarly dismissed: the brain's inability to perceive its own sub-foundational processes generates the illusion of an immaterial interior life, while neuroscience progressively maps the specific cortical and subcortical circuits — parietal, insular, prefrontal, brainstem reticular formation — that produce agency, coherence, and conscious experience from entirely physical substrates.

Before arriving at a positive cosmological alternative, gnostic atheism disposes of nihilogony — creation ex nihilo — on three independent grounds. First, true inexistence is not a real state that the universe could have occupied or emerged from; it is a linguistic convenience, a word we possess, but the mere existence of a term does not guarantee the existence of a referent. Second, the physical vacuum — empty spacetime with its quantum fields, fluctuations, and geometric structure — is categorically not identical to true inexistence; conflating the two is a category error that cosmological nihilogony routinely commits. Third, and most fundamentally, absolute inexistence has no potentiality whatsoever — it cannot generate, permit, constrain, or probabilistically favor any outcome, because potentiality is itself a physical or logical property that presupposes some structure. Creation ex nihilo therefore fails not because it is merely unobserved or theologically convenient, but because inexistence is incoherent as an ontological state capable of transitioning into existence.

The broader cosmological picture offered as one view within gnostic atheism — not the only possible physicalist framework but a coherent and well-developed one — is that of cyclic, self-consistent ontological continuity, in which the universe arises not from nothing but from intrinsic logical and physical structure. In this view, both Everettian many-worlds and cyclic cosmology are more ontologically coherent than creation ex nihilo, because they require no external cause and no supernatural initiator. Tradition, finally, functions as institutional armor for unexamined falsehood: when an unfounded claim acquires historical longevity, it becomes embedded in law, social expectation, and collective identity, making critical scrutiny appear as moral transgression rather than intellectual obligation.

== See also ==
- Antitheism – Opposition to theism, and usually to religion
- Ignosticism – Idea that the question of the existence of God is meaningless
- Nontheism – Absence of espoused belief in a God or gods
