= Intermediair =

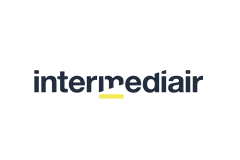
Intermediair Logo

Intermediair is a Dutch website for "higher educated professionals in the fields of management, consulting, personnel counselling, financial administration and controlling, and law."

== History and profile ==
Intermediair was launched in 1965. The magazine is owned by De Persgroep. It was published by the VNU Media on a weekly basis and is based in Amsterdam.

In 2010 Intermediair had a circulation of 191.644 copies. In 2012 Intermediair ceased to exist on paper, and went digital only.

Since 2018 the weekly digital magazine was discontinued. The website nowadays publishes articles piecemeal. A newsletter by email is available upon request.

The focus continues to be general career advice, contemporary management practices and a database of job vacancies.
