= George H. Smith =

American philosopher (1949–2022)

George Hamilton Smith
- Born: February 10, 1949; Japan
- Died: April 8, 2022 (aged 73); Bloomington, Illinois, U.S.
- Education: University of Arizona
- Writing career
- Genre: Critical view
- Subjects: Atheism, classical liberalism (liberalism in the United States)
- Notable works: Atheism: The Case Against God (1974); Atheism, Ayn Rand and Other Heresies (1991); Why Atheism? (2000); The System of Liberty (2013)
- Movements: Libertarianism (later), Objectivism (early), anarcho-capitalism, philosophical anarchism

George Hamilton Smith (February 10, 1949 – April 8, 2022) was an American author, editor, educator, and speaker known for his writings on atheism and libertarianism in the United States.

== Early life and activism ==
Born in Japan in 1949 to Frank and Juanita Smith, the young Smith grew up mostly in Tucson, Arizona, and attended the University of Arizona for several years, where he organized an Objectivist club named Students of Objectivism before leaving without a degree; he relocated to Los Angeles in 1971. With the help of American libertarian editor Roy Childs, he secured a contract from Nash Publishing (then located in Los Angeles) to produce a book on atheism. The finished product was his first book, Atheism: The Case Against God (1974), which continued to be reprinted many years after. It was in Atheism: The Case Against God that Smith stated he became an atheist by the time he was 16. Around this period, he saw Ayn Rand on The Tonight Show saying that she was an atheist; impressed, Smith sought out her books.

== Career ==
Smith began teaching in the 1970s, first under the auspices of his own Forum for Philosophical Studies (with offices on Sunset Boulevard in Los Angeles), later under the auspices of American libertartian think tanks like the Cato Institute and the Institute for Humane Studies (IHS). During the 1980s, Smith worked for more than six years as the general editor of Knowledge Products, a Nashville-based company that produced educational audio recordings in philosophy, history, economics, and current affairs; these came as a result of Nashville entrepreneur Crom Carmichael, who had attended Smith's seminars in those years and told the Cato Institute: "These lectures are great, but you're only reaching 75 people. You need to scale up."

In addition to his duties as editor, Smith was the primary scriptwriter for Knowledge Products' Great Political Thinkers series, and these recordings were used widely in college classrooms. For nearly twenty years, from the mid-1970s to the mid-1990s, Smith spent his summers teaching political philosophy and American political and intellectual history to university students at seminars sponsored by Cato Institute, IHS, and at other American libertarian conferences. After hearing his lectures, the American politician and Cato Institute co-founder Ed Crane said: "Why don't we just have George do all the lectures?"

Since 1971, more than one hundred of Smith's articles and book reviews appeared in a wide range of publications, most of them American libertarian magazines, including the Academic Associates Book News, Arizona Daily Star, Cato Policy Report, Free Inquiry, Humane Studies Review, The Humanist, Inquiry, Journal of Libertarian Studies, Liberty, The New York Times, Reason, and The Voluntaryist. In March 1990, he wrote for Liberty a denunciation of American libertarian academics at state universities as "libertarians on welfare". In 1991, Smith wrote Atheism, Ayn Rand and Other Heresies, which was published by Prometheus Books. In an op-ed for The New York Times in 1992, he defended the right of the Boy Scouts of America to refuse membership to atheists. (Note: For his op-ed, see Smith, George H. (January 9, 1992). "God and Boy In the Scouts". The New York Times. p. 23. ISSN 0362-4331. Archived from the original on May 15, 2022.)

Smith wrote a weekly column on American libertarian and classical liberal thought for Libertarianism.org, a website operated by the Cato Institute. Smith presented his arguments in favor of non-political participation in his party dialogue "Neither Bullets Nor Ballots", considering it a practice of power through rhetoric; even though its activity is carried out by parties in favor of freedom and justice, since in his views every party exercises the coercive power of the state, whether it uses it or not, and always under political commitments. Mistrusting all political activity, he separated American libertarianism from partisanship.

In November 1999, Smith wrote "In Defense of Rational Anarchism", where he argued that demarcations between the justice-enforcing government and the justice-violating gang was nowhere to be found in any existing organization claiming to be a government. He wrote: "Those familiar with its [i.e., 'consent' theory's] long history will understand that it has everywhere and always been used to defend and expand the absolute power of govern-ment." Ultimately, Smith argued that the "basic premise of anarchism" is that "true sovereignty resides in each individual, who has the right to assess the justice of a particular law, procedure or government". In 2000, Smith wrote Why Atheism?, which was published by Prometheus Books.

His published works often dealt with such issues as capital punishment (which he opposed), anarcho-capitalism and philosophical anarchism, American libertarianism, religious toleration, and atheism. Among many figures, he wrote about Thomas Hobbes, John Locke, Ayn Rand, Herbert Spencer, and William Wollaston; he also wrote an introduction, fourteen pages long, to a collection of work by Lysander Spooner. (Note: For his introduction, see Smith, George H. (1992). "Introduction by George H. Smith". In Tucker, Jeffrey (ed.). The Lysander Spooner Reader. New York City, New York: Laissez Faire Books. pp. 12–26. ISBN 978-1-62129-007-0. Archived from the original on December 18, 2024 – via Google Books.) From 2010 to 2020, he wrote around 300 essays on liberalism for Libertarianism.org, ranging from Aristotle and Thomas Aquinas to Adam Smith and the American Revolution to abolitionism.

On December 31, 2007, Smith provided a humorous qualified endorsement of Republican Party candidate Ron Paul for American libertarian voters but also one that was consistent with his published writings on electoral politics. In 2013, Cambridge University Press published his book The System of Liberty: Themes in the History of Classical Liberalism, which was praised by The Structure of Liberty: Justice and the Rule of Law author Randy E. Barnett, Libertarianism: What Everyone Needs to Know author Jason Brennan, and Radicals for Capitalism author Brian Doherty.

== Philosophy ==
Smith emphasized the importance of what he termed the "habit of reasonableness." In a 1976 lecture delivered to the Society of Separationists, he articulated the intellectual honesty he valued, stating: "one has nothing to fear and everything to gain, from the honest pursuit of truth."

== Death ==
Smith died on April 8, 2022, in Bloomington, Illinois. He was 73.

== Selected publications ==
- — (1974). Atheism: The Case Against God. Los Angeles, California: Nash. ISBN 978-0-87975-124-1. Archived from the original on December 18, 2024 – via Google Books.
- — (January–February 1977). "The Literature of Freethought". Libertarian Review. VI (1). Archived from the original on January 15, 2017 – via Libertarianism.org.
- — (1978). "William Wollaston on Property Rights" (PDF). Journal of Libertarian Studies. 2 (3): 217–225. Archived (PDF) from the original on June 13, 2021 – via Mises Institute.
- — (Winter 1979). "Justice Entrepreneurship in a Free Market" (PDF). Journal of Libertarian Studies. 3 (4): 405–426. Archived (PDF) from the original on December 11, 2019 – via Mises Institute.
- — (Winter 1979). "Justice Entrepreneurship Revisited" (PDF). Journal of Libertarian Studies. 3 (4): 453–469. Archived (PDF) from the original on November 18, 2021 – via Mises Institute.
- — (Spring 1981). "Herbert Spencer's Theory of Causation" (PDF). Journal of Libertarian Studies. 5 (2): 113–152. Archived (PDF) from the original on November 18, 2021 – via Mises Institute.
- — (1991). Atheism, Ayn Rand and Other Heresies. Buffalo, New York: Prometheus Books. ISBN 0-87975-577-6. Archived from the original on December 18, 2024 – via Google Books.
- — (November 1996). "A Killer's Right to Life" (PDF). Liberty. Vol. 10, no. 2. p. 46. Archived from the original (PDF) on January 9, 2021.
- — (July 1997). "Inalienable Rights?" (PDF). Liberty. Vol. 10, no. 6. p. 51. Archived from the original (PDF) on January 10, 2021.
- — (2000). Why Atheism?. Amherst, New York: Prometheus Books. ISBN 978-1-57392-268-5. Archived from the original on December 18, 2024 – via Google Books.
- — (2008). "Declaration of the Rights of Man and of the Citizen". In Hamowy, Ronald (ed.). The Encyclopedia of Libertarianism. Thousand Oaks, California: SAGE; Cato Institute. pp. 115–117. doi:10.4135/9781412965811.n73. ISBN 978-1-4129-6580-4. Archived from the original on December 18, 2024 – via Google Books.
- — (2013). The System of Liberty: Themes in the History of Classical Liberalism. New York City, New York: Cambridge University Press. ISBN 978-1-107-00507-5. Archived from the original on December 18, 2024 – via Google Books.

== See also ==
- American philosophy
- Debates within libertarianism
- Definition of anarchism and libertarianism
- Implicit and explicit atheism
- Issues in anarchism
- List of American philosophers
- Right-libertarianism
- Voluntaryism
