= Agnostic theism =

Philosophical view combining theism with agnosticism

Agnostic theism – or theistic agnosticism – is the philosophical view that encompasses both theism and agnosticism. An agnostic theist believes in the existence of one or more gods, but regards the basis of this proposition as currently unknown or inherently unknowable. The agnostic theist may also or alternatively be agnostic regarding the properties of the god or gods that they believe in.

== Views of agnostic theism ==
Agnostic theism is belief but without knowledge, as shown in purple and blue (see: Epistemology).

There are numerous beliefs that can be included in agnostic theism, such as fideism, the doctrine that knowledge depends on faith or revelation; not all agnostic theists are fideists. Since agnosticism is in the philosophical rather than religious sense an epistemological position on knowledge regarding the divine and does not forbid belief in the existence of one or more deities, it is considered to be compatible with both atheistic and theistic positions.

The classical philosophical understanding of knowledge is that knowledge is justified true belief. The founder of logotherapy, Viktor Frankl, may have well exemplified this definition. Seidner expands upon this example and stresses Frankl's characterization of unconscious. Agnostic theism could be interpreted as an admission that it is not possible to justify one's belief in a god sufficiently for it to be considered known. This may be because they consider faith a requirement of their religion, or because of the influence of plausible-seeming scientific or philosophical criticism.

Christian agnostics practice a distinct form of agnosticism that applies only to the attributes of the Christian God. They hold that it is difficult or impossible to be sure of anything beyond the basic tenets of the Christian faith. They believe that the Christian God exists, that Jesus has a special relationship with him and is in some way divine, and that God might perhaps be worshipped. This belief system has deep roots in Judaism and the early days of the Christian Church.

== See also ==
- Agnostic atheism
- Cosmological argument
- Ietsism
- Ignosticism
- Negative theology
- Pascal's wager
- Secular theology
- Sola fide
- Unknown God
