= Nontheism =

Absence of espoused belief in a God or gods

Nontheism or non-theism is a range of both religious and non-religious attitudes characterized by the absence of espoused belief in the existence of God or gods. Nontheism has generally been used to describe apathy or silence towards the subject of gods and differs from atheism, or active disbelief in any gods. It has been used as an umbrella term for summarizing various distinct and even mutually exclusive positions, such as atheism, agnosticism, apatheism, egotheism, ignosticism, ietsism, pantheism, deism, monism, pandeism, skepticism, and transtheism. It is in use in the fields of Christian apologetics and general liberal theology.

An early usage of the hyphenated term non-theism is attributed to George Holyoake in 1852. Within the scope of nontheistic agnosticism, philosopher Anthony Kenny distinguishes between agnostics who find the claim "God exists" uncertain and theological noncognitivists who consider all discussion of God to be meaningless. Some agnostics, however, are not nontheists but rather agnostic theists. Other related philosophical opinions about the existence of deities are ignosticism and skepticism. Because of the various definitions of the term God, a person could be an atheist in terms of certain conceptions of gods, while remaining agnostic in terms of others.

== Origin and definition ==
The Oxford English Dictionary (2007) does not have an entry for nontheism or non-theism, but it does have an entry for non-theist, defined as "A person who is not a theist", and an entry for the adjectival non-theistic.

An early usage of the hyphenated non-theism is by George Holyoake in 1852, who introduces it because:

Mr. [Charles] Southwell has taken an objection to the term Atheism. We are glad he has. We have disused it a long time [...]. We disuse it, because Atheist is a worn-out word. Both the ancients and the moderns have understood by it one without God, and also without morality. Thus the term connotes more than any well-informed and earnest person accepting it ever included in it; that is, the word carries with it associations of immorality, which have been repudiated by the Atheist as seriously as by the Christian. Non-theism is a term less open to the same misunderstanding, as it implies the simple non-acceptance of the Theist's explanation of the origin and government of the world.

This passage is cited by James Buchanan in his 1857 Modern Atheism under its forms of Pantheism, Materialism, Secularism, Development, and Natural Laws, who however goes on to state:

"Non-theism" was afterwards exchanged [by Holyoake] for "Secularism", as a term less liable to misconstruction, and more correctly descriptive of the real import of the theory.

Spelling without hyphen sees scattered use in the later 20th century, following Harvey Cox's 1966 Secular City: "Thus the hidden God or deus absconditus of biblical theology may be mistaken for the no-god-at-all of nontheism." Usage increased in the 1990s in contexts where association with the terms atheism or antitheism was unwanted. The 1998 Baker Encyclopedia of Christian Apologetics states, "In the strict sense, all forms of nontheisms are naturalistic, including atheism, pantheism, deism, and agnosticism."

Pema Chödrön uses the term in the context of Buddhism:

The difference between theism and nontheism is not whether one does or does not believe in God.[...] Theism is a deep-seated conviction that there's some hand to hold [...] Non-theism is relaxing with the ambiguity and uncertainty of the present moment without reaching for anything to protect ourselves [...] Nontheism is finally realizing there is no babysitter you can count on.

== Nontheistic religions ==
Nontheistic traditions of thought have played roles in Buddhism, Christianity, Nontheist Quakers, Humanistic Judaism, Hinduism, Jainism, Taoism, Creativity, Dudeism, Raëlism, Ethical movement, Unitarian Universalism, and Satanism (LaVeyan Satanism, The Satanic Temple).

== See also ==
- Apatheism
- Conceptions of God
- Cultural Christian
- Ethical culture
- Falsifiability
- Freethought
- God in Jainism
- Humanism
- Ietsism
- Jainism and non-creationism
- Language, Truth, and Logic
- Mu (negative)
- Naturalistic pantheism
- Nontheist Quakers
- Nondualism
- Secular humanism
- Transcendentalism
- Transtheism
- Satanism
