= Theological noncognitivism =

Position that the word God is not intelligible or meaningful

Theological noncognitivism is the non-theist position that religious language, particularly theological terminology such as 'God', is not intelligible or meaningful, and thus sentences like 'God exists' are cognitively meaningless. This would also imply that sentences like the negation of 'God exists' or 'God does not exist' are likewise meaningless, i.e., neither true nor false. It may be considered synonymous with ignosticism (also called igtheism), a term coined in 1964 by Sherwin Wine, a rabbi and a founding figure of Humanistic Judaism.

== Arguments ==
"God" can be proved not to mean anything that exists or that doesn't exist because the alleged definition of God is circular and meaningless. That meaningless circular definition is "God is the creator of everything but God". The circularity and resulting meaninglessness of this alleged definition is hidden from view by separating it into two separate sentences: (1) God is the creator of the universe. (2) The universe is everything but God. Religionists claim to believe both of these. But when (1) and (2) are combined, the circularity is clearly shown. (3) God is the creator of the universe, i.e., everything that exists except God. The word "God" cannot be defined in terms of the word "God". Thus, "God" is meaningless and cannot mean anything that exists or that doesn't exist.

== Relationship to other non-theist perspectives ==
Steven J. Conifer contrasts theological noncognitivism with positive atheism, which describes not only a lack of belief in gods but furthermore denies that gods exist thereby giving credence to the existence of a concept of something for "God" to refer to, because it assumes that there is something understandable to not believe in.

Paul Kurtz finds the view to be compatible with both weak atheism and agnosticism. However, Theodore Drange distinguishes noncognitivism and agnosticism, describing the latter as accepting that theological language is meaningful but being noncommittal about its truth or falsity on the grounds of insufficient evidence.

== See also ==
- Apophatic theology
- Conceptions of God
- Fideism
- Ietsism
- Ineffability
- Münchhausen trilemma
- Mysticism
- Newton's flaming laser sword
- Problem of religious language
- Thought-terminating cliché
- Eliminative materialism

== Bibliography ==
- Conifer, Steven J. (June 2002). "Theological Noncognitivism Examined". The Interlocutor. 4. Archived from the original on January 23, 2004.
- Drange, Theodore (1998). "Atheism, Agnosticism, Noncognitivism". Internet Infidels.
- Kurtz, Paul (1992). The New Skepticism: Inquiry and Reliable Knowledge. Buffalo: Prometheus Books. ISBN 0-87975-766-3. "Both [atheism and agnosticism] are consistent with igtheism, which finds the belief in a metaphysical, transcendent being basically incoherent and unintelligible."
- Lazarus, James (2004). "The Argument from Non-Cognitivism". Strong Atheism.
- Martin, Michael (1990). Atheism: A Philosophical Justification. Temple University Press. ISBN 978-0-87722-642-0.
- Martin, Michael (1999). "Positive Atheism and The Meaninglessness of Theism". Internet Infidels.
- Rauch, Jonathan (2003). "Let It Be". The Atlantic. Vol. 291, no. 4.
- Smith, George H. (1979). Atheism: The Case Against God. Buffalo, New York: Prometheus. ISBN 0-87975-124-X.
- Spiegel, Irving (1965). "Jewish 'Ignostic' Stirs Convention; Dropping of 'God' in Service Deplored and Condoned". New York Times. p. 62.
