= Apatheism =

Apathy toward the existence or non-existence of God

Apatheism (/ˌæpəˈθiːɪzəm/; a portmanteau of apathy and theism) is the attitude of apathy toward the existence or non-existence of God(s). It is regarded more as an attitude rather than a belief, claim, or belief system. The term was coined by Canadian sociologist Stuart Johnson.

An apatheist is someone who is not interested in accepting or rejecting any claims concerning the existence of gods. The existence of a god or gods is not rejected, but may be designated irrelevant. One of the first recorded apatheists was arguably Denis Diderot (1713–1784), who wrote: "It is very important not to mistake hemlock for parsley; but not at all so to believe or not in God."

Philosopher Trevor Hedberg has called apatheism "uncharted territory in the philosophy of religion". Political theorist and constitutional law scholar Adam Scott Kunz has further defined apatheism as "the philosophical attitude of indifference, both public and private, to (1) the question of the existence of a deity, (2) the metaphysical and practical value of loyalty to that deity, and/or (3) the interaction of that deity with the natural world".

== Etymology ==
Apatheism was coined by Canadian sociologist Stuart Johnson in his study of indifference to religion amid secularization, published in 1972.

== Arguments and rationale ==
Apatheism considers the question of the existence or nonexistence of deities to be fundamentally irrelevant in every way that matters. This position should not be understood as a skeptical position in a manner similar to that of, for example, atheists or agnostics who question the existence of deities or whether we can know anything about them.

Adam Scott Kunz has argued that apatheism's opposite is zeal, just as atheism's opposite is theism. Instead of viewing apatheism as a different form of belief, Kunz argues that apatheism and zeal can interact with atheism and theism on a two-dimensional spectrum similar to a political spectrum. A person can be a theist, while at the same time have an attitude of apatheism (such beliefs are common in deism) or zeal toward questions of existence, loyalty, or involvement of deity. Likewise, an atheist can be either apatheistic or zealous.

Neil Macdonald of CBC defines the apatheist as "someone who has absolutely no interest in the question of a god's (or gods') existence, and is just as uninterested in telling anyone else what to believe".

Apatheists may feel that even if there are gods/deities and the existence and legitimacy of them were proven, it would not make a difference to them for one reason or another; therefore, which one(s), if any, are real does not matter and any discussion about it is meaningless. This approach is similar to that of practical atheism. An apatheist may also simply have no interest in the god debate simply for lack of interest in the topic. Another apatheistic argument states that morals do not come from god and that if a god exists, there would be no changes with regard to morality; therefore, a god's existence or non-existence is irrelevant.

== Related views ==
=== Apathetic agnosticism ===
A view related to apatheism, apathetic agnosticism claims that no amount of debate can prove or disprove the existence of one or more deities, and if one or more deities exist, they do not appear to be concerned about the fate of humans; therefore, their existence has little to no impact on personal human affairs. This view has also been called Pragmatic Agnosticism.

=== Practical atheism ===
The view that one should live their life with disregard towards a god or gods. Practical atheism does not see the god questions as irrelevant, in contrast to apatheism. Thus, "practical atheism is disregard for the answers to [God questions], not a disregard for [God questions] per se. Unlike atheism proper, the practical atheist acts as if God does not exist and has no authority over his life despite his belief in God. Hence, practical atheism is not actual atheism."

== See also ==
- Cosmicism § Cosmic indifferentism
- Creator in Buddhism – Buddhist views on the belief in a creator deity, or any eternal divine personal being
- Indifferentism – Belief about religion or philosophy
- Nontheism – Absence of espoused belief in a God or gods
- Omnism – Recognition and respect all beliefs or lack thereof
- Pandeism – Belief that God created the universe by becoming it
- Postchristianity – Loss of Christianity's cultural dominance
- Post-theism – Variant of nontheism
- Theological noncognitivism – Position that the word God is not intelligible or meaningful
- Transtheism – Religious philosophy
- Atheism – Absence of belief in the existence of deities; the opposite of theism
- Agnosticism – Doubt about God's existence
- Acedia
