= Ignosticism =

Idea that the question of the existence of God is meaningless

Ignosticism or igtheism is the idea that the question of the existence of God is meaningless because the word "God" has no coherent and unambiguous definition.

== Terminology ==
The term ignosticism was coined in 1964 by Sherwin Wine, a former Reform rabbi and a founding figure of Humanistic Judaism.

== Distinction from theological noncognitivism ==
Ignosticism and theological noncognitivism are similar although whereas the ignostic says "every theological position assumes too much about the concept of God", the theological noncognitivist claims to have no concept whatever to label as "a concept of God", but the relationship of ignosticism to other nontheistic views is less clear. While Paul Kurtz finds the view to be compatible with both weak atheism and agnosticism, other philosophers consider ignosticism to be distinct.

== See also ==
- Apatheism
- Apophatic theology
- Atheism
- Conceptions of God
- Epistemology
- Ietsism
- Loki's Wager
- Pantheism
- Scientific method
- Verificationism
- Agnosticism

== Sources ==
- Conifer, Steven J. (June 2002). "Theological Noncognitivism Examined". The Interlocutor. 4. Archived from the original on January 23, 2004.
- Drange, Theodore (1998). "Atheism, Agnosticism, Noncognitivism". Internet Infidels.
- Kurtz, Paul (1992). The New Skepticism: Inquiry and Reliable Knowledge. Buffalo: Prometheus Books. ISBN 0-87975-766-3.
- Lindsay, James A. (2015). Everybody is Wrong About God. Pitchstone Publishing. ISBN 978-1-63431-036-9.
- Rauch, Jonathan (2003). "Let It Be". The Atlantic. Vol. 291, no. 4.
- Spiegel, Irving (1965-06-20). "Jewish 'Ignostic' Stirs Convention; Dropping of 'God' in Service Deplored and Condoned". New York Times. p. 62.
