= David Bentley Hart bibliography =

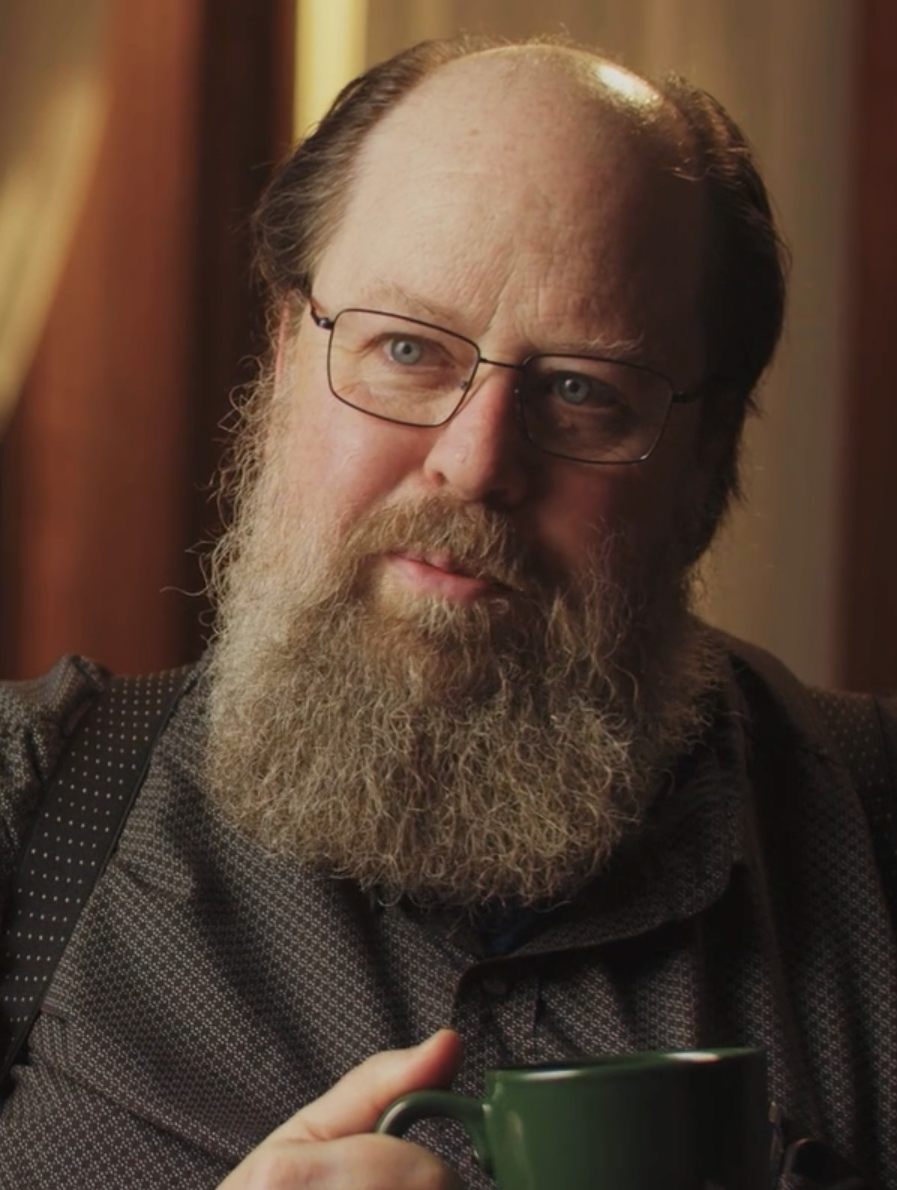
David Bentley Hart in 2022

This is a list of books, selected essays, and selected recordings by David Bentley Hart in reverse chronological order.

== Books ==
=== Author ===
- A Gathering of Leaves: Extravagances and Ephemera. Notre Dame, IN: University of Notre Dame Press. 2026. ISBN 9780268211257
- The Light of Tabor: Toward a Monistic Christology. Notre Dame, IN: University of Notre Dame Press. 2025. ISBN 9780268210410
- All Things Are Full of Gods: The Mysteries of Mind and Life. New Haven, CT: Yale University Press. 2024. ISBN 9780300254723
- Prisms, Veils: A Book of Fables. Notre Dame, IN: University of Notre Dame Press. 2024. ISBN 9780268208448
- The Mystery of the Green Star. David Bentley Hart and Patrick Robert Hart. Brooklyn, NY: Angelico Press. 2023. ISBN 9781621389484
- You Are Gods: On Nature and Supernature. Notre Dame, IN: University of Notre Dame Press, 2022. ISBN 9780268201944
- Tradition and Apocalypse: An Essay on the Future of Christian Belief. Grand Rapids, MI: Baker Academic. 2022. ISBN 9780801039386
- Kenogaia (A Gnostic Tale). Brooklyn, NY: Angelico Press. 2021. ISBN 9781621387947
- Roland In Moonlight. Brooklyn, NY: Angelico Press. 2021.
- Theological Territories: A David Bentley Hart Digest. Notre Dame, IN: University of Notre Dame Press. 2020. ISBN 9780268107185
- The Mystery of Castle MacGorilla. With Patrick Robert Hart. New York: Angelico Press. 2019.
- That All Shall Be Saved: Heaven, Hell, and Universal Salvation. New Haven, CT: Yale University Press: 2019.
- The Hidden and the Manifest: Essays in Theology and Metaphysics. Grand Rapids: Eerdmans. 2017.
- The Dream-Child's Progress and Other Essays. New York: Angelico Press. 2017.
- A Splendid Wickedness and Other Essays. Grand Rapids: Eerdmans: 2016.
- The Experience of God: Being, Consciousness, Bliss. New Haven, CT: Yale University Press: 2013.
- The Devil and Pierre Gernet: Stories. Grand Rapids, MI: Wm. B. Eerdmans: 2012. ISBN 9780802817686
- Atheist Delusions: The Christian Revolution and Its Fashionable Enemies. New Haven, CT: Yale University Press, 2009.
- In the Aftermath: Provocations and Laments. Grand Rapids, MI: Wm. B. Eerdmans: 2008. ISBN 9780802845733
- The Story of Christianity: An Illustrated History of 2000 Years of the Christian Faith. London: Quercus: 2007.
- The Doors of the Sea. Grand Rapids, MI: Wm. B. Eerdmans: 2005.
- The Beauty of the Infinite: The Aesthetics of Christian Truth. Grand Rapids, MI: Wm. B. Eerdmans: 2003. ISBN 9780802829214
- Beauty, Violence, and Infinity: A Question Concerning Christian Rhetoric. University of Virginia: ProQuest Dissertations Publishing: 1997.

=== Translator ===
- Laozi, Tao Te Ching: A New Translation. Translated with Patrick Robert Hart. New Haven, CT: Yale University Press. 2026. ISBN 9780300284997
- The New Testament: A Translation. Yale University Press: 2017 (2nd edition in 2023).
- Erich Przywara, Analogia Entis: Metaphysics: Original Structure and Universal Rhythm. Grand Rapids, MI: Wm. B. Eerdmans: 2014. In collaboration with John R. Betz.
- "Was liegt jenseits des Kapitalismus? Eine christliche Untersuchung" in Pflug Magazin 3 (Sommer 2019).
- "The Peach Blossom Spring: A Translation (and apologia)"] by Tao Yuanming (Tao Qian—Tao the Recluse). Leaves in the Wind. October 31, 2021.

=== Editor ===
- There Is No Wealth but Life: A Christian Socialist Reader. Edited with Trevor Josef Logan. New Haven, CT: Yale University Press. Forthcoming, May 4, 2027. ISBN 9780300260816

== Articles and printed interviews (selected) ==
- "What we think we know about God" in The Christian Century (online 24 August 2023 and printed September 2023 issue)
- "How to Write English Prose" in The Lamp Magazine (Christmas 2022)
- "Reality Minus" in The New Atlantis (Spring 2022)
- "Three Cheers for Socialism: Christian Love & Political Practice" in Commonweal (February 2020).
- "Divorce, Annulment, & Communion" in Commonweal (August 2019).
- "What Lies Beyond Capitalism? A Christian Exploration"] in Plough Quarterly 21 (Summer 2019).
- "Quentin Tarantino's Cosmic Justice" in The New York Times (August 6, 2019).
- "Can We Please Relax About 'Socialism'?" in The New York Times (April 27, 2019).
- "The New York Yankees Are a Moral Abomination" in The New York Times (July 14, 2018).
- "Everything you know about the Gospel of Paul is likely wrong" in Aeon (January 8, 2018.)
- "Christians and the Death Penalty" in Commonweal (November 2017).
- "Are Christians Supposed to be Communists?" in Archived from the Wayback Machine. The New York Times (November 4, 2017).
- "The Illusionist" in The New Atlantis (Summer/Fall 2017)
- "From a Vanished Library" in First Things (April 2017).
- 'We need to talk about God', Church Times (an independent Church of England newspaper), February 2016.
- "Christ's Rabble" in Commonweal (September 2016).
- "Habetis Papam", First Things (December 2015).
- "Saint Origen", First Things (October 2015).
- "The Myth of Schism" in Clarion Journal (June 2014).
- "Therapeutic Superstition" in First Things (November 2012).
- "Saint Sakyamuni" in First Things (September 2009)
- Response to critiques of The Beauty of the Infinite by Francesca Murphy and John A. McGuckin, Scottish Journal of Theology 60 (February 2007): 95-101.
- "Daniel Dennett Hunts the Snark" in First Things 169 (January 2007).
- Contribution to "Theology as Knowledge: A Symposium" in First Things 163 (May 2006): 21–27.
- "The Lively God of Robert Jenson" in First Things 156 (October 2005): 28–34.
- "The Anti-Theology of the Body" in The New Atlantis 9 (Summer 2005): 65–73.
- "The Soul of a Controversy" in The Wall Street Journal (April 1, 2005).
- "Tsunami and Theodicy" in First Things 151 (March 2005): 6–9.
- "The Laughter of the Philosophers" in First Things 149 (January 2005): 31–38. A review loosely structured around The Humor of Kierkegaard by Thomas C. Oden, containing a long excursus on Johann Georg Hamann.
- "God or Nothingness" in I Am the Lord Your God: Christian Reflections on the Ten Commandments Carl E. Braaten and Christopher Seitz, eds. Grand Rapids, MI: Eerdmans, 2005: 55–76.
- "The Offering of Names: Metaphysics, Nihilism, and Analogy" in Reason and the Reasons of Faith. Reinhard Hütter and Paul J. Griffiths, eds. London: T. & T. Clark, 2005: 55–76.
- "Tremors of Doubt" in The Wall Street Journal (December 31, 2004). This article was the seed for the book The Doors of the Sea.
- "Ecumenical Councils of War" in Touchstone (November 2004).
- "The Pornography Culture" in The New Atlantis 6 (Summer 2004): 82–89.
- "Freedom and Decency" in First Things 144 (June/July 2004): 35–41.
- "An Orthodox Easter" in The Wall Street Journal (April 9, 2004) (in "Houses of Worship").
- "Religion in America: Ancient & Modern", The New Criterion (March 2004).
- "A Most Partial Historian" in First Things 138 (December 2003): 34–41. A review of Religion and Public Doctrine in Modern England Volume III: Accommodations by Maurice Cowling.
- "Christ and Nothing" in First Things 136 (October 2003): 47–57.
- "The Bright Morning of the Soul: John of the Cross on Theosis", Pro Ecclesia (Summer 2003): 324–45.
- "Thine Own of Thine Own: the Orthodox Understanding of Eucharistic Sacrifice" in Rediscovering the Eucharist: Ecumenical Considerations Roch A. Kereszty, ed. (Paulist Press, 2003): 142–169.
- "The Mirror of the Infinite: Gregory of Nyssa on the Vestigia Trinitatis", Modern Theology 18.4 (October 2002): 542–56.
- "No Shadow of Turning: On Divine Impassibility", Pro Ecclesia (Spring 2002): 184–206.
- Contribution to "The Future of the Papacy: A Symposium" in First Things (March 2001): 28–36.
- "The 'Whole Humanity': Gregory of Nyssa's Critique of Slavery in Light of His Eschatology", Scottish Journal of Theology 54.1 (2001): 51–69.
- "Analogy" in Elsevier Concise Encyclopaedia of Religion and Language (Elsevier Press, 2001).
- "The Writing of the Kingdom: Thirty-Seven Aphorisms towards an Eschatology of the Text", Modern Theology (Spring 2000): 181–202.
- "A Gift Exceeding Every Debt: An Eastern Orthodox Appreciation of Anselm's Cur Deus Homo", Pro Ecclesia 7.3 (1998): 333–348.
- "Matter, Monism, and Narrative: An Essay on the Metaphysics of Paradise Lost" Milton Quarterly (Winter 1996): 16–27.

== Book reviews (selected) ==
- "Mind Over Matter" in Commonweal (January 2019). A review of Lloyd P. Gerson's translation of The Enneads by Plotinus.
- "Shock of the Real" in First Things (November 2017). A long essay-review of Natasha Lehrer's translation of "Équipée" by Victor Segalen.
- "Empson in the East" in First Things (May 2017). A review of "The Face of the Buddha" by William Empson.
- "Our Atheism is Different" in Commonweal (June 2016). A review of Battling the Gods by Tim Whitmarsh.
- "Dante Decluttered: A review of The Divine Comedy" in First Things (November 2013). A review of Clive James' translation of "The Divine Comedy".
- "Inside the mind of the Archbishop of Canterbury" in The Times Literary Supplement (March 2008). A review of Rowan Williams's "Wrestling with Angels," edited by Mike Higton.
- "Con Man" in The New Criterion (September 2006): 124. A review of "The Theocons: Secular America under Siege" by Damon Linker.
- "Beyond Disbelief" in The New Criterion (June 2005): 78–81. A review of "The Twilight of Atheism" by Alister McGrath.
- "Roland Redivivus" in First Things 150 (February 2005): 44–48. A review of Orlando Innamorato by Matteo Maria Boiardo, translated by Charles Stanley Ross.
- "The Laughter of the Philosophers" in First Things 149 (January 2005): 31–38. A review loosely structured around The Humor of Kierkegaard by Thomas C. Oden, containing a long excursus on Johann Georg Hamann.
- "When the Going was Bad" in First Things 143 (May 2004): 50–53. A review of Waugh Abroad: Collected Travel Writing by Evelyn Waugh.
- "Sheer Extravagant Violence" in First Things 139 (January 2004): 64–69. A review of Taras Bulba by Nikolai Gogol, translated by Peter Constantine.
- "A Most Partial Historian" in First Things 138 (December 2003): 34–41. A review of Religion and Public Doctrine in Modern England Volume III: Accommodations by Maurice Cowling.
- Review of Gianni Vattimo's Belief, The Journal of Religion 82.1 (Jan. 2002): 132–133.
- "Israel and the Nations" in First Things 105 (August/September 2000): 51–54. A review of Church and Israel After Christendom: The Politics of Election by Scott Bader–Saye.
- "Review Essay: On Catherine Pickstock's After Writing", Pro Ecclesia (Summer 2000): 367–372.
- "Beyond Reductionism" in First Things 87 (November 1998): 55–57. A review of Religious Mystery and Rational Reflection by Louis Dupre.

== Recordings (selected) ==
- "Ep. 108 David Bentley Hart responds to claims of heresy by Fr. James Dominic Rooney regarding the necessity of all being saved." on the Grace Saves All podcast with David Artman. January 2023.
- "David Bentley Hart on Grace, with Jennifer Newsome Martin."
- "You Are Gods with David Bentley Hart and John Milbank."
- "Orthodox Scholars Preach: Sunday of the Publican & the Pharisee - David Bentley Hart." with the Greek Orthodox Archdiocese of America and The Orthodox Christian Studies Center of Fordham University.
