= The Experience of God: Being, Consciousness, Bliss =

2013 book by David Bentley Hart

- Cover of The Experience of God: Being, Consciousness, Bliss
- Author: David Bentley Hart
- Language: English
- Genre: philosophy of religion, theology
- Publisher: Yale University Press
- Publication date: September 2013
- Publication place: United States

The Experience of God: Being, Consciousness, Bliss is a 2013 book by philosopher and religious studies scholar David Bentley Hart published by Yale University Press. The book lays out a statement and defense of classical theism and attempts to provide an explanation of how the word "God" functions in the theistic faiths, drawing particularly from Christianity, Islam and Hinduism.

== Content ==
The book consists of 365 pages and is structured in three main parts: "God, Gods, and the World," "Being, Consciousness, Bliss," and "The Reality of God." The three chapters contained in the second part constitute the bulk of the book's arguments, which center on ontology, philosophy of mind, and transcendental teleology. Hart utilizes and defends a form of the contingency argument, contending that "no contingent reality could exist at all if there were not a necessary dimension of reality sustaining it in existence." He also argues that "consciousness cannot be satisfactorily explained in purely physical terms," and that the "rational capacity to think and to act in obedience to absolute or transcendental values constitutes a dependency of consciousness upon a dimension of reality found nowhere within the physical order."

One of the key themes of the book is the proper definition of God in the classical theistic traditions. Hart insists that God is not merely "a being among other beings, not even the greatest possible of beings, but is instead the fullness of Being itself, the absolute plenitude of reality upon which all else depends." He identifies as a strawman the common notion "that belief in God is no more than belief in some magical invisible friend who lives beyond the clouds, or in some ghostly cosmic mechanic invoked to explain gaps in current scientific knowledge."

He opposes the Deistic view (of a de facto "demiurge" which merely set in motion the universe at the beginning of time and then let it run its course) to the theistic view, all instants in the history of existence have been created by God simulteanously and are experienced by God simultaneously, deriving each their existence from God. For Hart, science can only disprove a Deistic notion of God (which has merely chronological priority) but not the theistic God (which has ontological priority, answering why there is something rather than nothing). Even if everything that exists can be explained by physical laws, there still remains the question of why anything (including the physical laws) exists in the first place.

He further argues that consciousness must be prior to physical reality, with the latter emerging out of the former (an argument he would expand on in All Things Are Full of Gods), and that God is the ultimate end of every human longing, being capable of satisfying every one of them and bringing about complete bliss; the basic human appetite for beauty, love, truth, justice and happiness is truly a search for God, Who alone is all those things to the infinite: according to Hart, a rejection of God can only happen if one either has a distorted and incomplete picture of who God is, or does not understand their desires can only be fully satisfied by union with God, and in either case only as a result of deficient understanding, not inherent depravity.

At points throughout the book, Hart criticizes the works of the 'new atheists,' including Richard Dawkins and Daniel Dennett, stating that "what is most astonishing about the recent new atheist bestsellers has not been the patent flimsiness of their arguments, but the sheer lack of intellectual curiosity they betray." In addition to opposing atheistic materialism and mechanistic philosophy, however, Hart also counters various forms of religious fundamentalism, critiquing biblical literalism, young earth creationism, and the intelligent design movement. He also engages in a nuanced manner with the arguments of Anselm, Thomas Aquinas, and more recent Christian philosophers such as Alvin Plantinga.

== Reception ==
Paul J. Griffiths praised the book for "bringing together Sanskritic analyses of God's being with Latin and Greek and Arabic ones," and Rowan Williams described the book as a "masterpiece of quiet intellectual and spiritual passion" that "magnificently sets the record straight as to what sort of God Christians believe in and why." Robert Barron has likewise praised Hart's treatment of theology proper in refutation of atheism, saying "there's hardly anyone better" on the subject.

The book was given a positive review by Oliver Burkeman in The Guardian, who called it "the one theology book all atheists really should read." Writing in The Week, Damon Linkler, gave the book a positive review, calling it "stunning." Francesca Aran Murphy, writing in First Things claimed that "The Experience of God is a first step toward bringing God back into the public square."

Philip McCosker, writing in The Tablet, gave the book a mixed review. He praised Hart's writing style, calling it "by turns elegant, curmudgeonly, witty, infuriating, incisive, nostalgic, rhapsodical, explosive, frequently bang on the money – and always stimulating," but criticized what he saw as Hart's reliance on "pompous put-down in place of argument." He also questioned the book's suitability for general readers.

== See also ==
- Roland in Moonlight
- David Bentley Hart bibliography
- Vishishtadvaita Vedanta
- Classical theism
