= Universalism =

Concept that some ideas have universal applicability

Universalism is the philosophical and theological concept that some ideas have universal application or applicability.

A belief in one fundamental truth is another important tenet in universalism. The living truth is seen as more far-reaching than the national, cultural, or religious boundaries or interpretations of that one truth. A community that calls itself universalist may emphasize the universal principles of most religions, and accept others in an inclusive manner.

Universalism can also mean the pursuit of unification of all human beings across geographic and other boundaries under universal values, or the application of universalist constructs, such as human rights or international law.

Christian universalism refers to the idea that every human will eventually receive salvation in a religious or spiritual sense, a concept also referred to as universal reconciliation.

== Philosophy ==
=== Philosophical universalism ===
In philosophy, universality is the idea that universal facts exist and can be discovered, as opposed to relativism, which asserts that all facts are relative to one's perspective.

=== Moral universalism ===
Moral universalism (also called moral objectivism or universal morality) is the meta-ethical position that some systems of ethics apply universally. That system is inclusive of all individuals, regardless of culture, race, sex, religion, nationality, sexual orientation, or any other distinguishing feature. Moral universalism is opposed to moral nihilism and moral relativism. However, not all forms of moral universalism are absolutist, nor do they necessarily value monism. Many forms of universalism, such as utilitarianism, are non-absolutist. Other forms such as those theorized by Isaiah Berlin, may value pluralist ideals.

== Religion ==
=== Baháʼí Faith ===
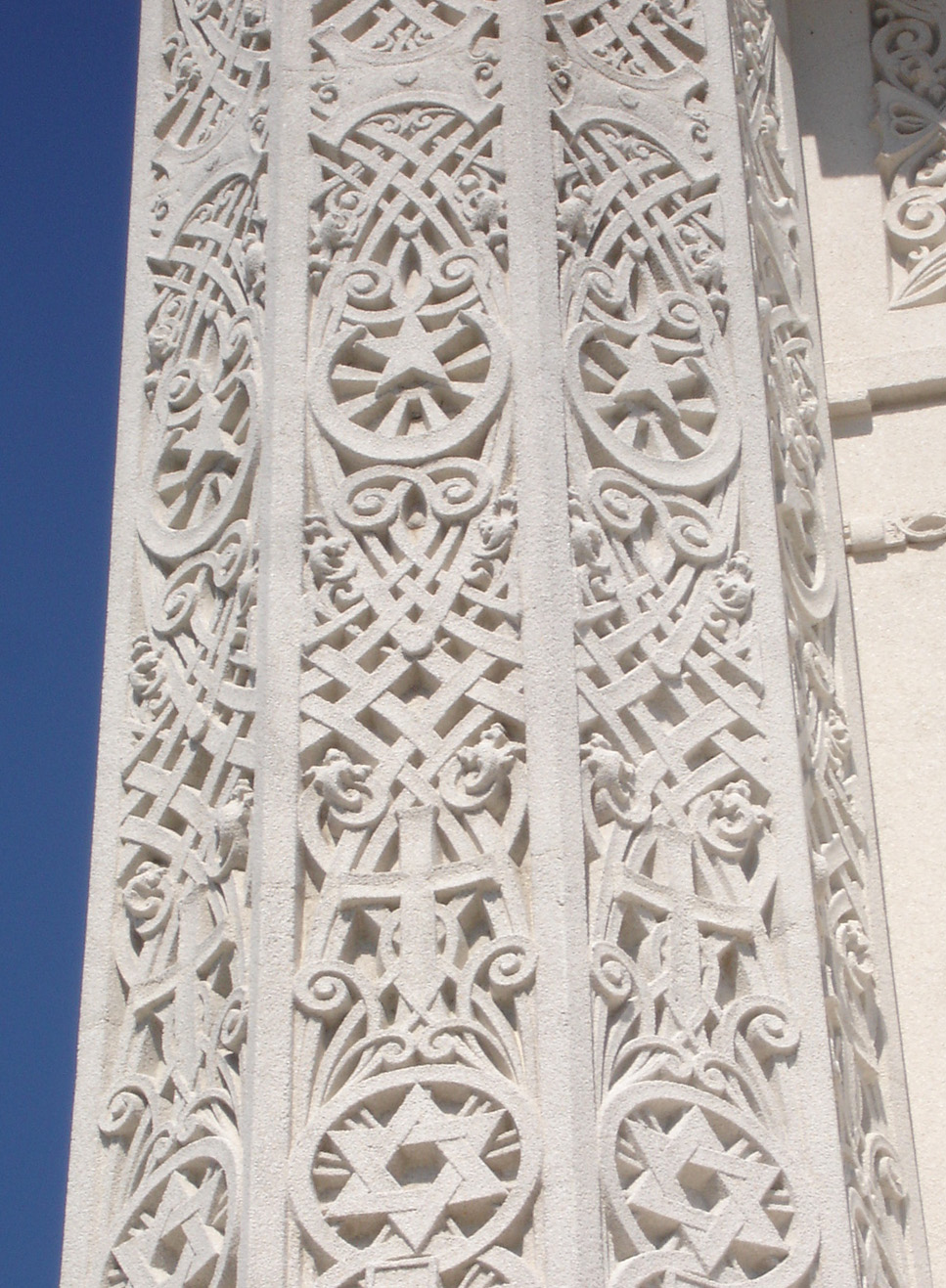
Symbols of many religions on a pillar of the Baháʼí House of Worship in Wilmette, Illinois

In the teachings of the Baháʼí Faith, a single God has sent all the historic founders of the world religions in a process of progressive revelation. As a result, the major world religions are seen as divine in origin and are continuous in their purpose. In this view, there is unity among the founders of world religions, but each revelation brings a more advanced set of teachings in human history and none are syncretic. In addition, the Baháʼí teachings acknowledge that in every country and every people God has always revealed the divine purpose via messengers and prophets, masters and sages since time immemorial.

Within this universal view, the unity of humanity is one of the central teachings of the Baháʼí Faith. The Baháʼí teachings state that since all humans have been created in the image of God, God does not make any distinction between people with regard to race, colour or religion. Thus, because all humans have been created equal, they all require equal opportunities and treatment. Hence the Baháʼí view promotes the unity of humanity, and that people's vision should be world-embracing and that people should love the whole world rather than just their nation.

The teaching, however, does not equate unity with uniformity; instead the Baháʼí writings advocate the principle of unity in diversity where the variety in the human race is valued. Operating on a worldwide basis this cooperative view of the peoples and nations of the planet culminates in a vision of the practicality of the progression in world affairs towards, and the inevitability of, world peace.

=== Buddhism ===
The term Universalism has been applied to different aspects of Buddhist thought by different modern authors.

The idea of universal salvation is key to the Mahayana school of Buddhism. A common feature of Mahayana Buddhism is the idea that all living beings have Buddha nature and thus all beings can aspire to become bodhisattvas, beings who are on the path to Buddhahood. This capacity is seen as something that all beings in the universe have. This idea has been termed "bodhisattva universalism" by the Buddhist studies scholar Jan Nattier.

The idea of universal Buddha nature has been interpreted in various ways in Buddhism, from the idea that all living beings have Buddha nature and thus can become Buddhas to the idea that because all beings have Buddha nature, all beings will definitely become Buddhas. Some forms of East Asian Mahayana Buddhism even extended the Buddha nature theory to plants and insentient phenomena. Some thinkers (such as Kukai) even promote the idea that the entire universe is the Buddha's body.

The Lotus Sutra, an influential Mahayana scripture, is often seen as promoting the universality of Buddhahood, the Buddha's teaching as well as the equality of all living beings. Mahayana Buddhism also promotes a universal compassion towards all sentient beings and sees all beings as equally deserving of compassion. The doctrine of the One Vehicle (which states that all Buddhist paths lead to Buddhahood) is also often seen as a universalist doctrine.

Adherents to Pure Land Buddhism point to Amitabha Buddha as a Universal Savior. According to the Pure Land Sutras (scriptures), before becoming a Buddha Amitabha vowed that he would save all beings and according to some Pure Land authors, all beings will be eventually saved through the work of Amida Buddha. As such, Pure Land Buddhism is often seen as an expression of a Buddhist universalism that compares to Christian universalism. This comparison has also been commented on by Christian theologians like Karl Barth.

Chinese Buddhism developed a form of Buddhist universalism which saw Confucianism, Daoism and Buddhism as different aspects of a single universal truth.

In Western Buddhism, the term Universalism may also refer to an nonsectarian and eclectic form of Buddhism which emphasizes ecumenism among the different Buddhism schools. US clergyman Julius A. Goldwater was one Buddhist figure who promoted a modern kind of Buddhist Universalism. For Goldwater, Buddhism transcends local contexts and culture, and his practice grew increasingly eclectic over time. Goldwater established the nonsectarian Buddhist Brotherhood of America which focused on ecumenical and nonsectarian Buddhism while also drawing on Protestant vocabulary and ideas.

The desire to develop a more universalist and nonsectarian form of Buddhism was also shared by some modernist Japanese Buddhist authors, including the influential D.T. Suzuki.

=== Christianity ===
In Christianity, universalism generally refers to the doctrine of universal reconciliation, according to which all people will ultimately be saved and reconciled to God. Christian universalists have differed in their understanding of post-mortem punishment, with some accepting a temporary or remedial form of punishment while rejecting eternal damnation. They point to historical evidence showing that many early fathers of the church were universalists and attribute the origin of the idea of hell as eternal punishment to mistranslation. They also appeal to many texts of Scripture to argue that the concept of eternal hell is not biblically or historically supported either in Judaism or early Christianity.

Universalism developed into an organized Christian movement in North America during the eighteenth century. Among its early proponents were John Murray, Elhanan Winchester and Hosea Ballou. Universalist churches later formed the Universalist Church of America, which merged with the American Unitarian Association in 1961 to form the Unitarian Universalist Association.

Universalists cite numerous biblical passages which reference the salvation of all beings (such as Jesus' words in John 12:31-32, and Paul's words in Romans 5:18-19). In addition, they argue that an eternal hell is both unjust and contrary to the nature and attributes of a loving God.

The beliefs of Christian universalism are generally compatible with the essentials of Christianity, as they do not contradict any of the central affirmations summarized in the Nicene Creed. More specifically, universalists often emphasize the following teachings:

- God is the loving Parent of all people (see Love of God).
- Jesus Christ reveals the nature and character of God, and is the spiritual leader of humankind.
- Humankind is created with an immortal soul, which death can not end—or a mortal soul that shall be resurrected and preserved by God. A soul which God will not wholly destroy.
- Sin has negative consequences for the sinner either in this life or the afterlife. All of God's punishments for sin are corrective and remedial. None of such punishments will last forever, or result in the permanent destruction of a soul. Some Christian universalists believe in the idea of a Purgatorial Hell, or a temporary place of purification that some must undergo before their entrance into Heaven.

In 1899 the Universalist General Convention, later called the Universalist Church of America, adopted the Five Principles: the belief in God, Jesus Christ, the immortality of the human soul, the reality of sin and universal reconciliation.

==== History ====
Universalist writers such as George T. Knight have claimed that Universalism was a widely held view among theologians in Early Christianity. These included such important figures such as Alexandrian scholar Origen as well as Clement of Alexandria, a Christian theologian. Origen and Clement both included the existence of a non-eternal Hell in their teachings. Hell was remedial, in that it was a place one went to purge one's sins before entering into Heaven.

Between 1648-1697 English activist Gerrard Winstanley, writer Richard Coppin, and dissenter Jane Leade, each taught that God would grant all human beings salvation. The same teachings were later spread throughout 18th-century France and the US by George de Benneville. People who taught this doctrine in the US would later become known as the Universalist Church of America. The first Universalist Church in America was founded by John Murray (minister). The 18th century in North America saw decades of debates between two Christian universalist camps, universal restorationism, which believed in the existence of punishment after death, and ultra-universalism, which did not.

The Greek term apocatastasis came to be related by some to the beliefs of Christian universalism, but central to the doctrine was the restitution, or restoration of all sinful beings to God, and to His state of blessedness. In early Patristics, usage of the term is distinct.

==== Universalist theology ====
Universalist theology is grounded in history, scripture, and assumptions about the nature of God. That All Shall Be Saved (2019) by Orthodox Christian theologian David Bentley Hart contains arguments from all three areas but with a focus on arguments from the nature of God. Christian ultra-universalist Thomas Whittemore wrote the book 100 Scriptural Proofs that Jesus Christ Will Save All Mankind quoting both Old and New Testament verses which support the Universalist viewpoint.

Some common Bible verses cited by Christian universalists are Luke 3:6, John 17:2, 1 Corinthians 15:22, 2 Peter 3:9, 1 Timothy 2:3–6, 1 Timothy 4:10, 1 John 2:2, Romans 5:18 and Romans 11:32.

==== Questions of Biblical Translation ====
Christian universalists point towards the mistranslations of the Greek word αιών (literally "age," but often assumed to mean "eternity") and its adjectival form αἰώνιος (usually assumed to mean "eternal" or "everlasting"), as giving rise to the idea of an endless hell and the idea that some people will never be saved. For example, Revelation 14:11 says "the smoke of their torment goes up εἰς αἰῶνας αἰώνων" which most literally means "until ages of ages" but is often paraphrased in translations as "forever and ever."

This Greek word is the origin of the modern English word eon, which refers to a period of time or an epoch/age.

The 19th century theologian Marvin Vincent wrote about the word aion, and the supposed connotations of "eternal" or "temporal":

Aion, transliterated aeon, is a period of longer or shorter duration, having a beginning and an end, and complete in itself. [...] Neither the noun nor the adjective, in themselves, carry the sense of endless or everlasting."

A number of scholars have argued that, in some cases, the adjective may not indicate duration at all, but may instead have a qualitative meaning. For instance, Dr. David Bentley Hart translates Matthew 25:46 as "And these will go to the chastening of that Age, but the just to the life of that Age." In this reading, Jesus is not necessarily indicating how long the life and punishment last, but instead what kind the life and punishment are—they are "of the age [to come]" rather than being earthly life or punishment. Dr. Thomas Talbott writes:

[The writers of the New Testament] therefore came to employ the term aiōnios as an eschatological term, one that functioned as a handy reference to the realities of the age to come. In that way they managed to combine the more literal sense of "that which pertains to an age" with the more religious sense of "that which manifests the presence of God in a special way."

Dr. Ken Vincent writes that "When it (aion) was translated into Latin Vulgate, 'aion' became 'aeternam' which means 'eternal'. Likewise, Dr. Ilaria Ramelli explains:

The mistranslation and misinterpretation of αἰώνιος as "eternal" (already in Latin, where both αἰώνιος and ἀΐδιος are rendered aeternus and their fundamental semantic difference is blurred) certainly contributed a great deal to the rise of the doctrine of "eternal damnation" and of the "eternity of hell."

Among the English translations that do not render αἰώνιος as "eternal" or "everlasting" are Young's Literal Translation ("age-during"), the Weymouth New Testament ("of the ages"), the Concordant Literal Version ("eonian"), Rotherham's Emphasized Bible ("age-abiding"), Hart's New Testament ("of that Age"), and more.

=== Hinduism ===
Author David Frawley says that Hinduism has a "background universalism" and its teachings contain a "universal relevance." Hinduism is also naturally religiously pluralistic. A well-known Rig Vedic hymn says: "Ekam Sat Vipra Bahudha Vadanti" meaning, "Truth is One, though the sages know it variously." Similarly, in the Bhagavad Gītā (4:11), God, manifesting as an incarnation, states: "As people approach me, so I receive them. All paths lead to me." The Hindu religion has no theological difficulties in accepting degrees of truth in other religions. Hinduism emphasizes that everyone actually worships the same God, whether one knows it or not.

While Hinduism has an openness and tolerance towards other religions, it also has a wide range of diversity within it. There are considered to be six orthodox Hindu schools of philosophy/theology, as well as multiple unorthodox or "heterodox" traditions called darshanas.

==== Hindu universalism ====
Hindu universalism, also called Neo-Vedanta and neo-Hinduism, is a modern interpretation of Hinduism which developed in response to western colonialism and orientalism. It denotes the ideology that all religions are true and therefore worthy of toleration and respect.

It is a modern interpretation that aims to present Hinduism as a "homogenized ideal of Hinduism" with Advaita Vedanta as its central doctrine. For example, it presents that:

... an imagined "integral unity" that was probably little more than an "imagined" view of the religious life that pertained only to a cultural elite and that empirically speaking had very little reality "on the ground," as it were, throughout the centuries of cultural development in the South Asian region.

Hinduism embraces universalism by conceiving the whole world as a single family that deifies the one truth, and therefore it accepts all forms of beliefs and dismisses labels of distinct religions which would imply a division of identity.

This modernised re-interpretation has become a broad current in Indian culture, extending far beyond the Dashanami Sampradaya, the Advaita Vedanta Sampradaya founded by Adi Shankara. An early exponent of Hindu Universalism was Ram Mohan Roy, who established the Brahmo Samaj. Hindu Universalism was popularised in the 20th century in both India and the west by Vivekananda and Sarvepalli Radhakrishnan. Veneration for all other religions was articulated by Gandhi:

After long study and experience, I have come to the conclusion that [1] all religions are true; [2] all religions have some error in them; [3] all religions are almost as dear to me as my own Hinduism, in as much as all human beings should be as dear to one as one's own close relatives. My own veneration for other faiths is the same as that for my own faith; therefore no thought of conversion is possible.

Western orientalists played an important role in this popularisation, regarding Vedanta to be the "central theology of Hinduism". Oriental scholarship portrayed Hinduism as a "single world religion", and denigrated the heterogeneity of Hindu beliefs and practices as 'distortions' of the basic teachings of Vedanta.

=== Islam ===
Islam recognizes to a certain extent the validity of the Abrahamic religions, the Quran identifying Jews, Christians, and "Sabi'un" (usually taken as a reference to the Mandaeans) as "people of the Book" (ahl al-kitab). Later Islamic theologians expanded this definition to include Zoroastrians, and later even Hindus, as the early Islamic empire brought many people professing these religions under its dominion, but the Qur'an explicitly identifies only Jews, Christians, and Sabians as People of the Book.^{,}^{,} The relation between Islam and universalism has assumed crucial importance in the context of political Islam or Islamism, particularly in reference to Sayyid Qutb, a leading member of the Muslim Brotherhood movement, and one of the key contemporary philosophers of Islam.

There are several views within Islam with respect to Universalism. According to the most inclusive teachings all peoples of the book have a chance of salvation. For example, Surah 2:62 states:

Indeed, the believers, Jews, Christians, and Sabians—whoever ˹truly˺ believes in Allah and the Last Day and does good will have their reward with their Lord. And there will be no fear for them, nor will they grieve.

— Surah Al-Baqara 2:62

However, the most exclusive teachings disagree. For example, Surah 9:5 states:

But once the Sacred Months have passed, kill the polytheists ˹who violated their treaties˺ wherever you find them, capture them, besiege them, and lie in wait for them on every way. But if they repent, perform prayers, and pay alms-tax, then set them free. Indeed, Allah is All-Forgiving, Most Merciful.

— Surah At-Tawbah 9:5

The interpretation of all of these passages are hotly contested amongst various schools of thought and branches of Islam as is the doctrine of abrogation (naskh) which is used to determine which verses take precedence, based on reconstructed chronology, with later verses superseding earlier ones. The ahadith also play a major role in this, and different schools of thought assign different weightings and rulings of authenticity to different hadith, with the four schools of Sunni thought accepting the Six Authentic Collections, generally along with the Muwatta Imam Malik. Depending on the level of acceptance of rejection of certain traditions, the interpretation of the Koran can be changed immensely, from the Qur'anists who reject the ahadith, to the ahl al-hadith, who hold the entirety of the traditional collections in great reverence.

Some Islamic scholars view the world as bipartite, consisting of the House of Islam, that is, where people live under the Sharia; and the House of War, that is, where the people do not live under Sharia, which must be proselytized using whatever resources available, including, in some traditionalist and conservative interpretations, the use of violence, as holy struggle in the path of God, to either convert its inhabitants to Islam, or to rule them under the Shariah (cf. dhimmi).

=== Judaism ===
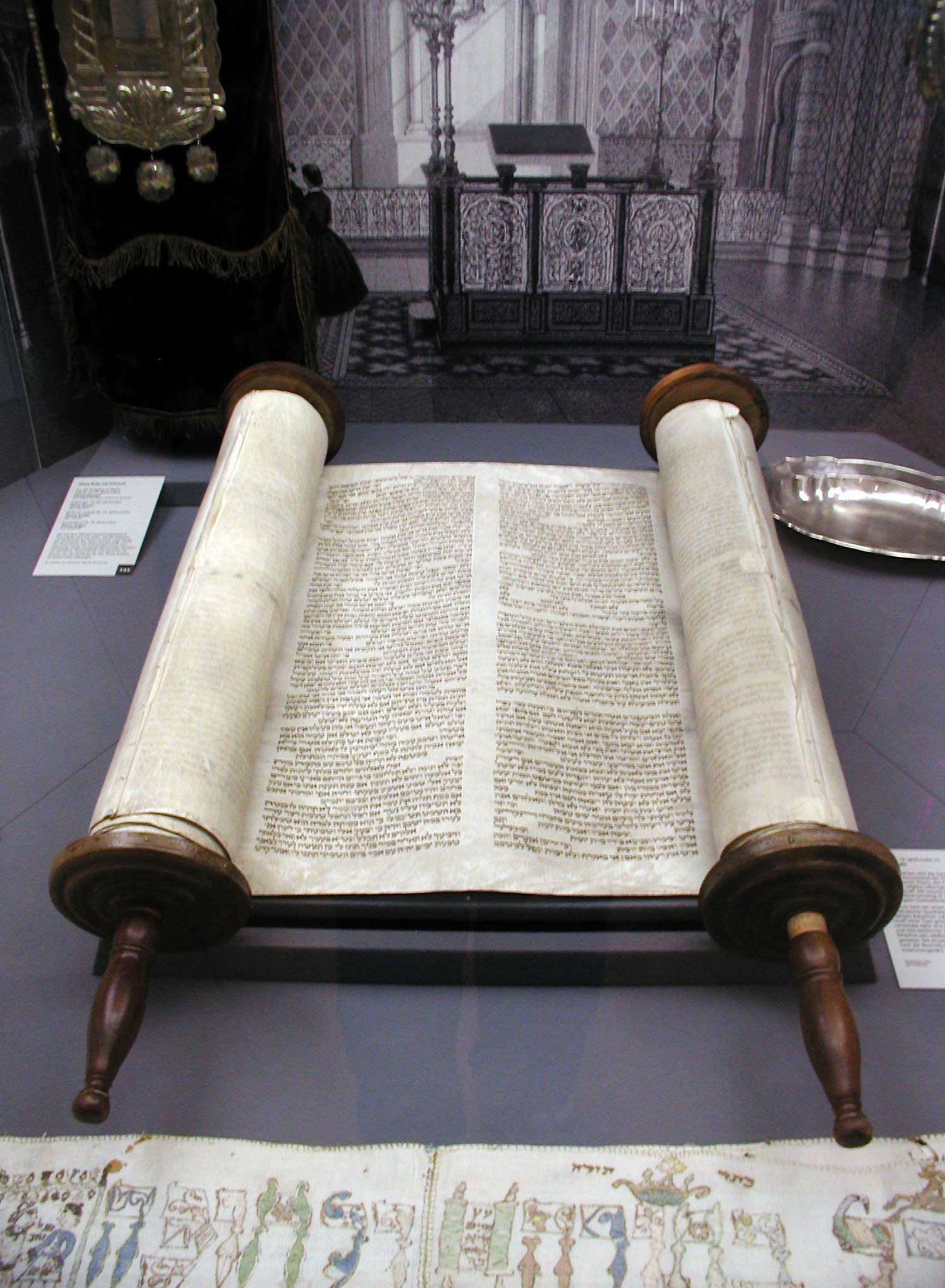
Sefer Torah at old Glockengasse Synagogue (reconstruction), Cologne

Judaism teaches that God chose the Jewish people, among all the peoples of the world that he created, to be in a unique covenant with God, and one of their beliefs is that Jewish people were charged by the Torah with a specific mission—to be a light unto the nations, and to exemplify the covenant with God as described in the Torah to other nations. This view does not preclude a belief that God also has a relationship with other peoples—rather, Judaism holds that God had entered into a covenant with all humanity as Noachides, and that Jews and non-Jews alike have a relationship with God, as well as being universal in the sense that it is open to all mankind.

Modern Jews such as Emmanuel Levinas advocate a universalist mindset that is performed through particularist behavior. An on-line organization, the Jewish Spiritual Leaders Institute founded and led by Steven Blane, who calls himself an "American Jewish Universalist Rabbi", believes in a more inclusive version of Jewish Universalism, stating that "God equally chose all nations to be lights unto the world, and we have much to learn and share with each other. We can only accomplish Tikkun Olam by our unconditional acceptance of each other's peaceful doctrines."

=== Manichaeism ===
Manichaeism, like Christian Gnosticism and Zurvanism, was arguably in some ways inherently universalist. Yet in other respects, it was quite contrary to universalistic principles, holding instead to an eternal dualism.

=== Sikhism ===
In Sikhism, all the religions of the world are compared to rivers flowing into a single ocean. Although the Sikh gurus did not agree with the practices of fasting, idolatry and pilgrimage during their times, they stressed that all religions should be tolerated. The Sikh scripture, the Guru Granth Sahib, contains the writings of not just the Sikh guru themselves, but the writings of several Hindu and Muslim saints, known as the Bhagats.

The very first word of the Sikh scripture is "Ik", followed by "Omkar". This literally means that there is only one god, and that one is wholesome, inclusive of the whole universe. It further goes on to state that all of creation, and all energy is part of this primordial being. As such, it is described in scripture over and over again, that all that occurs is part of the divine will, and as such, has to be accepted. It occurs for a reason, even if it is beyond the grasp of one person to understand.

Although Sikhism does not teach that men are created as an image of God, it states that the essence of the One is to be found throughout all of its creation. As was said by Yogi Bhajan, the man who is credited with having brought Sikhism to the West:

If you can't see God in all, you can't see God at all.

— Sri Singh Sahib, Yogi Bhajan

The First Sikh Guru, Guru Nanak said himself:

There is no Hindu, there is no Muslim".

By this, Guru Nanak meant that there is no real "religion" in God's eyes. Unlike many of the major world religions, Sikhism does not have missionaries, instead it believes men have the freedom to find their own path to salvation.

=== Unitarian Universalism ===
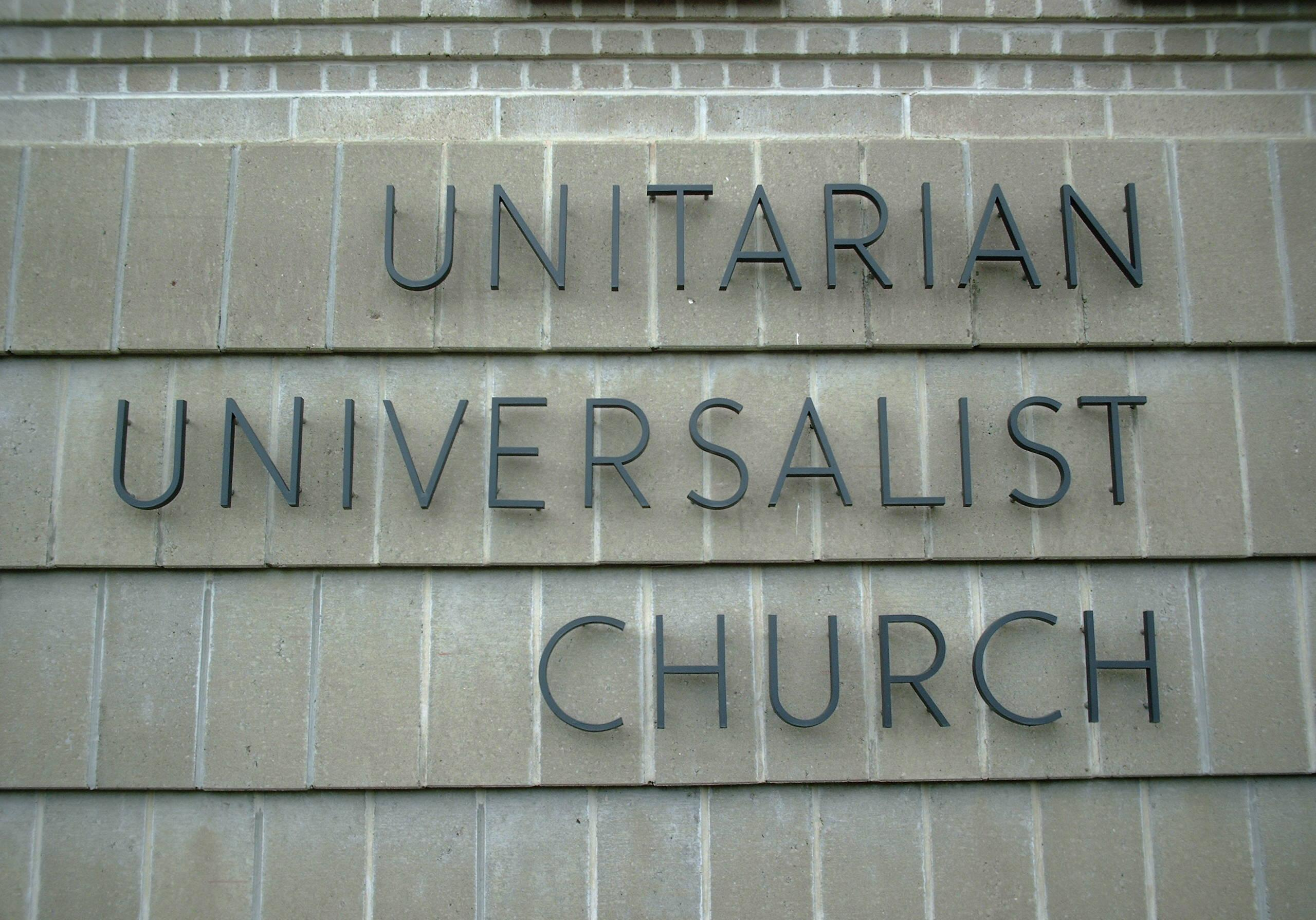
Sign on a UU church in Rochester, Minnesota, United States

Unitarian Universalism (UU) is a theologically liberal religion characterized by a "free and responsible search for truth and meaning". Unitarian Universalists do not share a creed; rather, they are unified by their shared search for spiritual growth and by the understanding that an individual's theology is a result of that search and not a result of obedience to an authoritarian requirement. Unitarian Universalists draw from all major world religions and many different theological sources and have a wide range of beliefs and practices.

While having its origins in Christianity, UU is no longer a Christian church. As of 2006, fewer than about 20% of Unitarian Universalists identified themselves as Christian. Contemporary Unitarian Universalism espouses a pluralist approach to religious belief, whereby members may describe themselves as humanist, agnostic, deist, atheist, pagan, Christian, monotheist, pantheist, polytheist, or assume no label at all.

The Unitarian Universalist Association (UUA) was formed in 1961, a consolidation of the American Unitarian Association, established in 1825, and the Universalist Church of America, established in 1866. It is headquartered in Boston, and mainly serves churches in the United States. The Canadian Unitarian Council became an independent body in 2002.

=== Zoroastrianism ===
Faravahar (or Ferohar), one of the primary symbols of Zoroastrianism, believed to be the depiction of a Fravashi (guardian spirit)

Some varieties of Zoroastrian (such as Zurvanism) are universalistic in application to all races, but not necessarily universalist in the sense of universal salvation.

== See also ==
- Ananda Marga
- Christianity:
  - Liberal Catholic Church
  - Primitive Baptist Universalist
  - Religious Society of Friends
  - Schwarzenau Brethren
  - Swedenborgianism (The New Church)
  - Trinitarian Universalism
- Church Universal and Triumphant
- Comparative religion
- Ecumenism
- Hypothetical universalism
- George MacDonald
- Mahatma Gandhi Foundation
- Omnism
- Orenda
- Perennial philosophy
- Post-theism
- Religious liberalism
- Religious pluralism
- Spannian universalism
- Subud
- Universal Sufism

== Sources ==
- Mura, Andrea (2014). "The Inclusive Dynamics of Islamic Universalism: From the Vantage Point of Sayyid Qutb's Critical Philosophy". Comparative Philosophy. 5 (1): 29–54. doi:10.31979/2151-6014(2014).050106. ISSN 2151-6014.
- Casara, E. (1984). Universalism in America.
- Ghazi, Abidullah Al-Ansari (2010). Raja Rammohun Roy: Encounter with Islam and Christianity and the Articulation of Hindu Self-Consciousness. Xlibris Corporation.
- King, Richard (1999). Orientalism and Religion: Post-Colonial Theory, India and "The Mystic East". Routledge.
- King, Richard (2002). Orientalism and Religion: Post-Colonial Theory, India and 'The Mystic East'. Routledge.
- Larson, Gerald James (December 2012). "The Issue of Not Being Different Enough: Some Reflections on Rajiv Malhotra's Being Different" (PDF). International Journal of Hindu Studies. 16 (3): 311–322. doi:10.1007/s11407-012-9129-8. S2CID 144728948.
- Michaelson, Jay (2009). Everything Is God: The Radical Path of Nondual Judaism. Shambhala.
- Sinari, Ramakant (2000). "Advaita and Contemporary Indian Philosophy". In Chattopadhyana (ed.). History of Science, Philosophy and Culture in Indian Civilization. Volume II, Part 2: Advaita Vedanta. Delhi: Centre for Studies in Civilizations.
- Woo, B. Hoon (2014). "Karl Barth's Doctrine of the Atonement and Universalism". Korea Reformed Journal. 32: 243–291.
- Yelle, Robert A. (December 2012). "Comparative Religion as Cultural Combat: Occidentalism and Relativism in Rajiv Malhotra's Being Different". International Journal of Hindu Studies. 16 (3): 335–348. doi:10.1007/s11407-012-9133-z. S2CID 144950049.
