= Meta-historical fall =

Belief that the fall of man happened outside of history

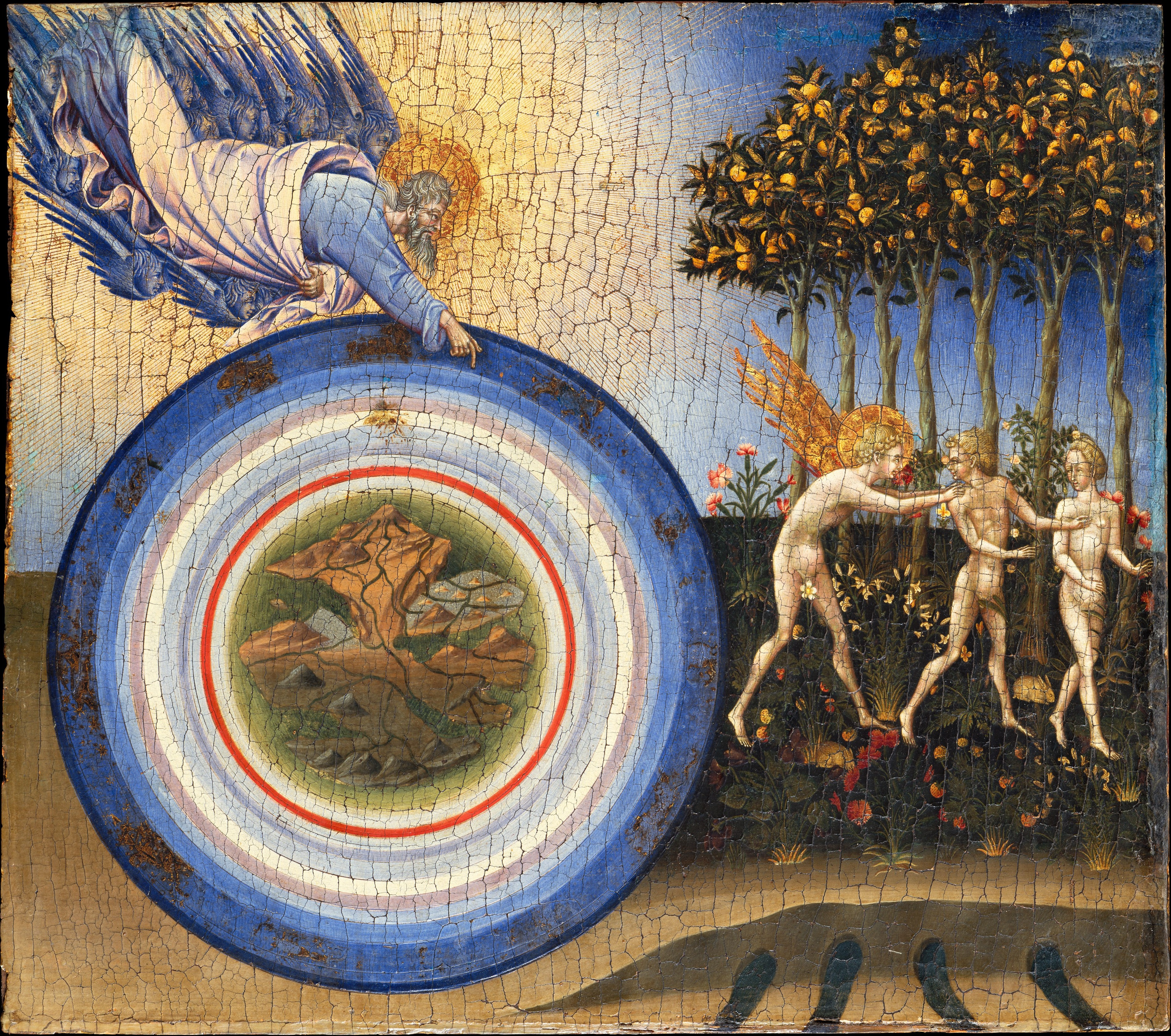
The Creation of the World and the Expulsion from Paradise by Giovanni di Paolo in 1445 (originally part of the altarpiece in Siena's church of San Domenico).

The meta-historical fall (also called a metaphysical, supramundane, atemporal, or pre-cosmic fall) is an understanding of the biblical fall of man as a reality outside of empirical history that affects the entire history of the universe. This understanding of the human fall is a minority view among contemporary Christian theologians and is associated by some with theological concepts often considered heresies, such as belief in the pre-existence of souls.

== History ==
Theologians and philosophers writing about a meta-historical fall in the modern era draw from metaphysical categories in related early patristic thought as well as Christian and Jewish Gnostic systems. The idea was revived by German philosophers such as Jakob Böhme, Friedrich Schelling, and Julius Müller that influenced the English poet and philosopher Samuel Coleridge as well as Russian philosophers and theologians Vladimir Solovyov, Nikolai Berdyaev and Sergei Bulgakov. Among the Church Fathers (especially Origen, Gregory of Nazianzus, Gregory of Nyssa, Evagrius Ponticus, and Maximus the Confessor), the fall was widely seen as a movement into our present biological condition as well as into our current experience of time, and this understanding has been developed by modern scholars such as Sergius Bulgakov who argue that the Fall should not be seen as a historical event but as a "meta-historical" one.

Sergius Bulgakov, in The Bride of the Lamb (published posthumously in 1945), said that "empirical history begins precisely with the fall, which is its starting premise." Noting that his "doctrine of a supramundane fall" was defended in The Burning Bush (1927), Bulgakov described how Adam's original sin, in which we each participate personally, "did not take place within the limits of this world" but outside "at the threshold of our entry into the world" and clarified that "the idea of [human] pre-existence in the sense of a time preceding our aeon was condemned by the Church" as Origenism and should be recognized as "essentially incompatible with a healthy ontology." Baptist theologian David L. Smith critiqued the idea of a meta-historical fall as incompatible with the doctrine of inherited guilt and therefore "unjust" while the Dutch Reformed theologian Herman Bavinck rejected this idea of the fall in Böhme and Schelling as a violation of individual free will.

== Related concepts ==
=== Eternity, forms of time and Creatio ex nihilo ===
This concept of a meta-historical fall involves the ideas of divine eternity and multiple modes of time within which empirical history is situated and on which it depends to some extent. English theologian E. L. Mascall wrote in 1943 that the Christian tradition has always understood creation as one "non-temporal act of the divine will" through which the entire "temporal created order is maintained in existence." Sergei Bulgakov described several kinds of time as different "modes of creaturely or temporal being" and included "angelic time" (with possible differentiations following the orders of angels). The concept of an atemporal creation and its relation to the fall are also considered by the English philosopher Stephen R. L. Clark and the French theologian Olivier Clément who wrote that "holy fathers, delving into the biblical texts, showed that the Fall represented a cosmic catastrophe, an eclipse of the paradisiacal mode of being and emergence of a new mode of existence in the whole universe" along with David Bentley Hart who discusses the concepts of an atemporal fall and a "fallen time" in two books. With a variation of this concept in the terms of analytical philosophy, Hud Hudson considers in a 2014 book how the hypertime hypothesis might inform the human fall's relation to empirical history.

These conceptions of time and eternity involve the multiple layers or repetitions in the Genesis accounts of creation and fall discussed by patristic authors such as Gregory of Nyssa in On the Making of the Human where Gregory considered Genesis 1:26-27 to move between descriptions of humanity before and after the fall. Theologian and patristic scholar John Behr summarizes Origen as teaching that our beginning in this cosmos and its "fallen time" should be understood as a falling away from the heavenly reality to which we are also invited to return. Maximus scholar Jordan Daniel Wood addresses time in relation to creation and the fall in a 2022 book, including the claim by Maximus the Confessor that the cosmos fell "at the very moment it appeared in existence" along with Adam's fall which occurred "together with coming-into-being."

Anti-Gnostic Saint Augustine of Hippo argued that God did not create the world in time. Rather, time itself, to Augustine, was created by God. Aquinas, responding to the assertion that "creation was not in the beginning of time", stated that "together with time heaven and earth were created." Ruth Coates among others stated that the view that "the finite natural universe [...] has an accidental character [...] being the result of the irrational metaphysical fall of Sophia" involved the assertion that "the finite natural universe is not created ex nihilo."

=== Cosmic and angelic falls ===
A meta-historical fall is sometimes considered under the larger category of a cosmic fall, understood as any concept of the fall where the entire natural world is damaged in some way by human sin. Ronald W. Hepburn's 1973 entry on the "Cosmic Fall" in the Dictionary of the History of Ideas described this broader category and had one example of a "pre-cosmic" or "transcendental" fall with Anglican priest and Oxford scholar N. P. Williams who described a fall that occurred in the "life-force" and "during an 'absolute' time" before life differentiated into its many present forms and separate species. Concepts of a cosmic human fall are also often understood alongside one or more angelic falls. Hepburn's entry on the "Cosmic Fall" noted the examples of C. C. J. Webb and Illtyd Trethowan. Sergius Bulgakov considered a separate angelic fall in The Bride of the Lamb. David Bentley Hart appeals to an idea from Maximus the Confessor that humanity is a methorios (boundary, frontier, or priesthood) that connects the physical and spiritual realms so that, in the human fall, all of material existence came under the "dominion of death." Christopher West, in summarizing the Theology of the Body by Pope John Paul II, describes how "'original man' gives way to 'historical man'."

Theologian David Bentley Hart argues that “natural evil is the result of a world that's fallen into death” and says that “in Christian tradition, you don't just accept ‘the world as it is’” but “you take ‘the world as it is’ as a broken, shadowy remnant of what it should have been.” Clarifying that he means an atemporal fall, Hart says: “obviously, wherever this departure from the divine happened, or whenever, it didn't happen within terrestrial history” and “this world, as we know it, from the Big Bang up until today, has been the world of death.” In line with this claim that a human fall outside of our empirical history precipitated our current world into its reduced form of existence, Hart says that our world is not simply the creation of a good God but is also (partially and contingently) the result of creaturely failure, resistance, or rebellion. Hart writes that this idea of an atemporal fall can be taken to the extreme of a fully dualistic gnosticism, but that this dualism can also be seen as provisional so that the good, true, and beautiful in this fallen world is understood as fractured and captive portions of God's creation. In his 2008 book The Groaning of Creation, Christopher Southgate criticizes David Bentley Hart and Clark Pinnock for suggesting that human and angelic rebellions have corrupted our empirical world because "a Christian theology of creation must" take seriously the Genesis 1 narrative that everything came to be through "the fiat of God" and that "divine power has shaped all the matter and mechanisms of the cosmos."

As a wider context to fallenness, Sergius Bulgakov also recognizes a creaturely limitedness and imperfection regardless of any fall. This unfallen and sinless creaturely imperfection provides the context within which Bulgakov describes a separate atemporal human fall involving evil, sin, and death. He writes in The Bride of the Lamb that "creaturely creativity entails not only the possibility but even the inevitability of errors, which, in themselves, are not yet evil but prepare a place for evil" and that this is true of unfallen angels as well as of fallen angels and humanity before and after their fall.

=== Ideas of integration with modern science ===
Anglican priest Peter Green wrote a book in 1920 proposing, on the grounds of modern science, that the human fall did not take place in this world but was a "pre-mundane event." Orthodox Christian Bishop Basil Rodzianko argued in a 1996 book that the fall and exile of the first humans from paradise should be understood in connection to the Big Bang and the formation of our current universe. He writes that "all people who have ever lived on earth ... are 'Adam's fragments'" and that we should understand "humanity as a whole" as "on the other side" of the Big Bang while the "'fragments' are on this side of the terrible explosion."

Paleontologist Alexander V. Khramov wrote in 2017 that the Big Bang should not be interpreted as the "first creative act of God" but as the "first cognizable manifestation of the human fall." He was influenced by Russian religious philosophers Nikolai Berdyaev and Evgenii Troubetzkoy and contended that every Christian writer before Augustine believed that all creation was "altered drastically after man's disobedience." Having the fall located outside of the theorized Big Bang means that Khramov considers the entire history of evolution on earth to follow after the human fall as he further argued in a 2019 book.

Philosopher Travis Dumsday argues that versions of the meta-historical fall which distinguish Edenic time from ordinary cosmic time require an account of how events in the former can cause evolutionary suffering in the latter. He regards this difficulty as inconclusive and suggests that a developed account of time, potentially drawing on Hud Hudson’s concept of hypertime, could help address it.

== See also ==
- Maximus the Confessor
- Kephalaia Gnostika – Metaphysical treatise on cosmogony by Evagrius Ponticus
- Jakob Böhme
- Friedrich Schelling
- Sergei Bulgakov
- The Doors of the Sea
- Seven heavens
- Tohu and Tikun
