= Powers and principalities =

The powers and principalities are entities mentioned in the Pauline epistles as equivocal celestial rulers. According to theologian and scholar of religion David Bentley Hart, they are "those elemental guardians of the nations who, according to the New Testament, have been appointed as wardens in the earth, but who frequently forget their roles and resist the sway of God. They are dangerous, but not evil; they are, rather, morally neutral, like the forces of material nature".

== Biblical references ==
Book	Verses	Text
Romans	8:38-8:39	"For I am persuaded, that neither death, nor life, nor angels, nor principalities, nor powers, nor things present, nor things to come, Nor height, nor depth, nor any other creature, shall be able to separate us from the love of God, which is in Christ Jesus our Lord."
Colossians	1:16	"For by him were all things created, that are in heaven, and that are in earth, visible and invisible, whether they be thrones, or dominions, or principalities, or powers: all things were created by him, and for him."
Ephesians	1:20	"Which he wrought in Christ, when he raised him from the dead, and set him at his own right hand in the heavenly places. Far above all principality, and power, and might, and dominion, and every name that is named, not only in this world, but also in that which is to come."
Ephesians	3:9-10	"And to make all men see what is the fellowship of the mystery, which from the beginning of the world hath been hid in God, who created all things by Jesus Christ: to the intent that now unto the principalities and powers in heavenly places might be known by the church the manifold wisdom of God."
Ephesians	6:12	"For we wrestle not against flesh and blood, but against principalities, against powers, against the rulers of the darkness of this world, against the spiritual forces of wickedness in high places."

== Early Christian references references ==
They are seemingly referred to in one of the few surviving fragments by Papias of Hierapolis, in which he says "to some of the Angels He gave dominion over the arrangement of the world, and He commissioned them to exercise their dominion well, but it happened that their arrangement came to nothing".
