= Reinhard Hütter =

German Catholic theologian (born 1958)

- Born: November 1, 1958 (age 67); Lichtenfels, Bavaria

Academic background
- Education: Duke Divinity School (Th.M.); Friedrich-Alexander-Universität Erlangen-Nürnberg (Dr. theol. habil.)
- Thesis: Theologie als kirchliche Praktik: zur Verhältnisbestimmung von Kirche, Lehre und Theologie (1997)

Academic work
- Discipline: Theology
- Institutions: Duke Divinity School; Catholic University of America; Lutheran School of Theology
- Main interests: Systematic Theology; Philosophical Theology; Dogmatic Theology; Theological Anthropology; Doctrine of God; St. Thomas Aquinas; St. John Henry Newman
- Notable works: Dust Bound for Heaven: Explorations in the Theology of Thomas Aquinas (2012)

Reinhard Hütter (born 1 November 1958 in Lichtenfels, Bavaria) is a German Catholic theologian. He is currently Visiting Professor of Catholic Theology at Duke Divinity School and Professor Emeritus of Fundamental and Dogmatic Theology at The Catholic University of America. During the 2012–2013 academic year, he held The Rev. Robert J. Randall Professor in Christian Culture chair at Providence College. In 2021 Hütter was appointed by Pope Francis to serve a five year term on the International Theological Commission.

Hütter teaches systematic and philosophical theology. In his most recent work he has turned to theological anthropology—the human being created in the image of God—and to the closely related topics of nature and grace, divine and human freedom, faith and reason, theology and metaphysics. He has developed a special interest in the theology and philosophy of St. Thomas Aquinas.

The author of numerous books, articles, reviews, and translations, he has also co-edited five books. His most recent books include Dust Bound for Heaven: Explorations in the Theology of Thomas Aquinas; Reason and the Reasons of Faith (ed. with Paul J. Griffiths); and Ressourcement Thomism: Sacred Doctrine, the Sacraments, and the Moral Life (ed. with Matthew Levering). He was the editor of Pro Ecclesia: a Journal of Catholic and Evangelical Theology and served on the editorial board of Theology Today. He is co-editor of the academic series Faith and Reason: Studies in Catholic Theology and Philosophy and Renewal Within Tradition: Nova & Vetera Books, and is co-editor of Nova et Vetera: The English Edition of the International Theological Journal.

He was awarded the Henry Luce III Fellowship, was a visiting fellow at the Institute for Advanced Studies of Religion of the University of Chicago, a research fellow at the Center of Theological Inquiry at Princeton, served as visiting professor at the University of Jena, Germany, was elected for membership in the American Theological Society, serves as the incoming President of the Academy of Catholic Theology, is a Distinguished Fellow of The St. Paul Center for Biblical Theology, and an Ordinary Academician of the Pontifical Academy of Saint Thomas Aquinas. A former Lutheran, he became a member of the Catholic Church in 2004. On 6 May 2009 he was elected by the University Council to be President of the Catholic University of Eichstätt-Ingolstadt. On 25 May 2009 Hutter announced the support of the University, the Foundation Catholic University of Eichstätt-Ingolstadt, but also announced that he would not take office. The negotiations for a conclusion of the agreement had failed. Reinhard Hütter is particularly concerned with theological and philosophical anthropology (faith and reason, nature and grace, freedom of God and man) with emphasis on ecumenism. He is considered an expert on the life and work of Thomas Aquinas. He is involved in numerous committees. Among other things, he is an elected member of the American Theological Society, and a permanent member of the Pontifical Academy of Saint Thomas Aquinas. Until 2008 he was editor of Pro Ecclesia.

Hütter was honored with a festschrift edited by Thomas Pfau and Matthew Levering in 2026.

== Publications ==
=== Books ===
- Hütter, Reinhard (1993). Evangelische Ethik als kirchliches Zeugnis : Interpretationen zu Schlüsselfragen theologischer Ethik in der Gegenwart (in German). Neukirchen-Vluyn: Neukirchener. ISBN 978-3-7887-1448-2. OCLC 29515349.
- Hütter, Reinhard (1997). Theologie als kirchliche Praktik : zur Verhältnisbestimmung von Kirche, Lehre, und Theologie (in German). Gütersloh: Chr. Kaiser. ISBN 978-3-579-02026-6. OCLC 37497824.
- Hütter, Reinhard (2000). Suffering divine things : theology as church practice. Grand Rapids, Mich.: W.B. Eerdmans Pub. ISBN 978-0-8028-4454-5. OCLC 42296608.
- Hütter, Reinhard (2004). Bound to be free : evangelical Catholic engagements in ecclesiology, ethics, and ecumenism. Grand Rapids, Mich.: William B. Eerdmans Pub. ISBN 978-0-8028-2750-0. OCLC 55000828.
- Hütter, Reinhard (2012). Dust bound for heaven : explorations in the theology of Thomas Aquinas. Grand Rapids, Mich.: W.B. Eerdmans Pub. Co. ISBN 978-1-4674-3673-1. OCLC 844940398.
- Hütter, Reinhard (2019). Bound for Beatitude: A Thomistic Study in Eschatology and Ethics. Washington D.C.: The Catholic University of America Press. ISBN 978-0-8132-3630-8.
- Hütter, Reinhard (2020). John Henry Newman on Truth and Its Counterfeits: A Guide for Our Times. Washington D.C.: The Catholic University of America Press. ISBN 978-0-8132-3232-4.

=== Articles and Book Chapters ===
- "Lessings 'Anti-Goeze' im Rahmen des Fragmentenstreites," in Dietmar Pe¬schel (ed.), Germanistik in Erlangen. Hundert Jahre nach der Gründung des Deutschen Seminars, Erlangen 1983, 185-194.
- "The Church: Midwife of History or Witness to the Eschaton?" in Journal of Religious Ethics 18 (1990), 27–54.
- "Creatio ex nihilo: Promise of the Gift. Remembering the Christian Doctrine of Creation in Troubled Times," in Robert A. Brungs, S.J. and Marianne Postiglione, RSM (eds.), Some Christian and Jewish Perspectives on Creation. St. Louis: ITEST Faith/Science Press 1991, 1–12.
- "Martin Luther and Johannes Dietenberger on 'Good Works,'" in Lutheran Quarterly 6 (1992), 127–152 (reprinted in Luther Digest 1994).
- "Ecclesial Ethics, the Church's Vocation, and Paraclesis," in Pro Ecclesia 2 (199), 433–450.
- with Hans G. Ulrich, "Einführung," to George Lindbeck, Christliche Lehre als Grammatik des Glaubens. Gütersloh: Gütersloher Verlagshaus, 1994, 7–15.
- "The Church as Public: Dogma, Practices, and the Holy Spirit," in Pro Ecclesia 3 (1994), 334–361.
- "Einführung," to Stanley Hauerwas, Selig sind die Friedfertigen. Ein Entwurf christlicher Ethik. Trans. by G.Cliqué. Neukirchen-Vluyn: Neukirchener Verlag, 1995, 1–22.
- "Christliche Freiheit und die Wahrheit des Gesetzes: Das Anliegen der römisch-katholischen Moralenzyklika Veritatis Splendor in der Perspektive reformatorischer Theologie," in Kerygma und Dogma 42 (1996), 246–271.
- "'God's Law' in Veritatis Splendor: Sic et Non," in: Reinhard Hütter and Theodor Dieter (eds.), Ecumenical Ventures in Ethics: Protestants Engage Pope John Paul II's Moral Encyclicals. Grand Rapids: Eerdmans 1998, 84–114.
- "The Project," in: Reinhard Hütter and Theodor Dieter (eds.), Ecumenical Ventures in Ethics: Protestants Engage Pope John Paul II's Moral Encyclicals. Grand Rapids: Eerdmans 1998, 1–13.
- "Christian Freedom and God's Commandments: The Twofold Center of Lutheran Ethics," in Karen Bloomquist and John Stumme (eds.), The Promise of Lutheran Ethics. Minneapolis: Fortress 1998, 31–54.
- "Ökumene und Einheit der Christen—Abstrakte Wiedervereinigung oder gelebte Einmütigkeit? Ein lutherischer Zugang zu der römisch-katholischen Ökumene-Enzyklika Ut Unum Sint—Daß sie eins seien," in Kerygma und Dogma 44 (1998), 193–206.
- "Ecumenism and Christian Unity—Abstract Re-unification or Living Concord? A Lutheran Approach to the Roman Catholic Encyclical 'Ut Unum Sint—That They may be One,'"in Pro Ecclesia 7 (1998), 182–194.
- "Be Honest In Just War Thinking! Lutherans, the Just War Tradition, and Selective Conscientious Objection," in Stanley Hauerwas, Chris K. Huebner, Harry J. Huebner, and Mark Thiessen Nation (eds.), The Wisdom of the Cross: Essays in Honor of John Howard Yoder. Grand Rapids: Eerdmans, 1999, 69–83.
- "Karl Barth's Dialectical Catholicity: Sic et Non," in Modern Theology 16 (2000), 137–157.
- "After Dogmatics? Beobachtungen zur evangelischen Systematischen Theologie in den USA und in Deutschland an der Jahrhundertschwelle," in Theologische Literaturzeitung 125 (2000), 1103–1122.
- "'After Dogmatics?' Osservazioni sulla teologia sistematica evangelica negli USA alle soglie del nuovo secolo," in Protestantesimo 55 (2000), 251–274.
- "(Re-)Forming Freedom: Reflections 'after Veritatis Splendor' on Freedom's Fate in Modernity and Protestantism's Antinomian Captivity," in Modern Theology 17 (2001), 117–161.
- "The Church—The Knowledge of the Triune God: Practices, Doctrine, Theology," in James J. Buckley and David Yeago (eds.), Knowing the Triune God: The Work of the Spirit in the Practices of the Church. Grand Rapids: Eerdmans 2001, 23–47.
- "What is So Great about Freedom?" in Pro Ecclesia 10 (2001), 449–459. [Translation into Swedish: "Vad är dest som är så fantastisk med frihet", in Tidskrift för kyrklig teologi 2 (3/2006), 61–72].
- "Hospitality and Truth: The Disclosure of Practices in Worship and Doctrine," in Miroslav Volf and Dorothy C. Bass (eds.), Practicing Theology: Beliefs and Practices in Christian Life. Grand Rapids: Eerdmans 2002, 206–227.
- "Est and Esse: The Affirmative and the Negative in Theological Discourse," in Théologie Negative, textes reunis par Marco. M. Olivetti. Biblioteca dell' Archivio di Filosofia. Padua: CEDAM 2002, 425–340.
- "Welche Freiheit? Wessen Gebot? Die Zukunft lutherischer Ethik in Kirche und Öffentlichkeit," in Wolfgang and Ingrid Schoberth (eds.), Kirche—Ethik—Öffentlichkeit: Christliche Ethik in der Herausforderung. Münster: LIT, 2002, 165–182.
- "… paulatim facta est ratio humana sui ipsius captiva': Freedom, Truth, and the Unattended Problem of the Will in the Encyclical Fides et Ratio," in Neue Zeitschrift für Systematische Theologie und Religionsphilosophie 44 (2002), 268–283.
- "Freedom and Law: Toward a Theological Proposal," in Christopher I. Wilkins (ed.), The Papers of the Henry Luce III Fellows in Theology Vol. VI. Pittsburgh: The Association of Theological Schools in the United States and Canada 2003, 119–137.
- "Empfang und Gestalt: Skizze einer Theologie von Freiheit und Gesetz," in Kerygma und Dogma 49 (2003), 210–235.
- "'In.' Some Incipient Reflections on 'The Jewish People and their Sacred Scriptures in the Christian Bible' (Pontifical Biblical Commission 2001)," in Pro Ecclesia 13 (2004), 13–24.
- "The Tongue—Fallen and Restored: Reflections on the Three Voices of the Eighth Commandment," in I Am the Lord Your God: Christian Reflections on the Ten Commandments, ed. by Carl E. Braaten and Christopher R. Seitz (Grand Rapids: Eerdmans, 2004), 189–205.
- "The Ten Commandments as a Mirror of Sin(s): Anglican Decline—Lutheran Eclipse," in Pro Ecclesia 14 (2005), 47–58.
- with Paul J. Griffiths, "Introduction" to Reason and the Reasons of Faith: An Ecumenical Inquiry into Faith and Reason. London/New York: T&T Clark International 2005, 1–23.
- "The Directedness of Reasoning and the Metaphysics of Creation," in Paul J. Griffiths and Reinhard Hütter (eds.), Reason and the Reasons of Faith. London/New York: T&T Clark International 2005, 160–193.
- "Intellect and Will in the Encyclical Fides et Ratio and in Thomas Aquinas," in Nova et Vetera: The English Edition of the International Theological Journal 3 (2005), 579–603.
- "Desiderium Naturale Visionis Dei: Some Observations about Lawrence Feingold's and John Milbank's Recent Interventions in the Debate over the Natural Desire to See God," in Nova et Vetera: The English Edition of the International Theological Journal 5 (2007), 81–131.
- "St. Thomas on Grace and Free Will in the Initium Fidei: The Surpassing Augustinian Synthesis," in Nova et Vetera: The English Edition of the International Theological Journal 5 (2007), 521–553.
- "The Christian Life," in Kathryn Tanner, Ian Torrance, John Webster (eds.), The Oxford Handbook on Systematic Theology. Oxford: Oxford University Press, 2007, 285–305.
- "The Confession of Sin: Learning to Hear the Decalogue's Three Voices in Worship," in Ben Quash and Bernd Wannenwetsch (eds.), Handbook Worship and Ethics (Eerdmans, forthcoming).
- "Eucharistic Adoration in the Real Personal Presence of Christ: Making Explicit the Mystery of Faith by Way of Metaphysical Contemplation," forthcoming in Nova et Vetera: The English Edition of the International Theological Journal 7/1 (Winter 2009).
- "In hope he believed against hope" (Rom 4:18)—Faith and Hope, Two Pauline Motifs as Interpreted by Aquinas: A Re-lecture of Pope Benedict XVI's Encyclical Letter Spe Salvi," Nova et Vetera: The English Edition of the International Theological Journal 7/4 (Fall 2009). (A briefer version appeared in the 2010 volume of Doctor Communis, the annual Proceedings of the Pontifical Academy of St. Thomas Aquinas.)
- With Matthew Levering, "Introduction," Ressourcement Thomism: Essays in Honor of Romanus Cessario, O.P., ed. by Reinhard Hütter and Matthew Levering (CUA Press, 2010).
- "Dogma datur Christianis—intellectus per fidem a deceptione praeservatur: The Mysterium Fidei of Christ's Real Presence in the Eucharist by Way of Trans-substantiation," in Ressourcement Thomism: Essays in Honor of Romanus Cessario, O.P., ed. by Reinhard Hütter and Matthew Levering (CUA Press, 2010).
- "Attending to the Wisdom of God—From Effect to Cause, from Creation to God: A Contemporary Relecture of the Doctrine of the Analogy of Being according to Thomas Aquinas," in The Analogy of Being: Wisdom of God or Invention of the Anti-Christ?, ed. Thomas Joseph White, O.P. (Eerdmans, 2010)

== Online articles ==
- "Bound to be Free – Religion Online". Religion Online.
