= Alexander V. Khramov =

Russian paleontologist and writer (born 1989)

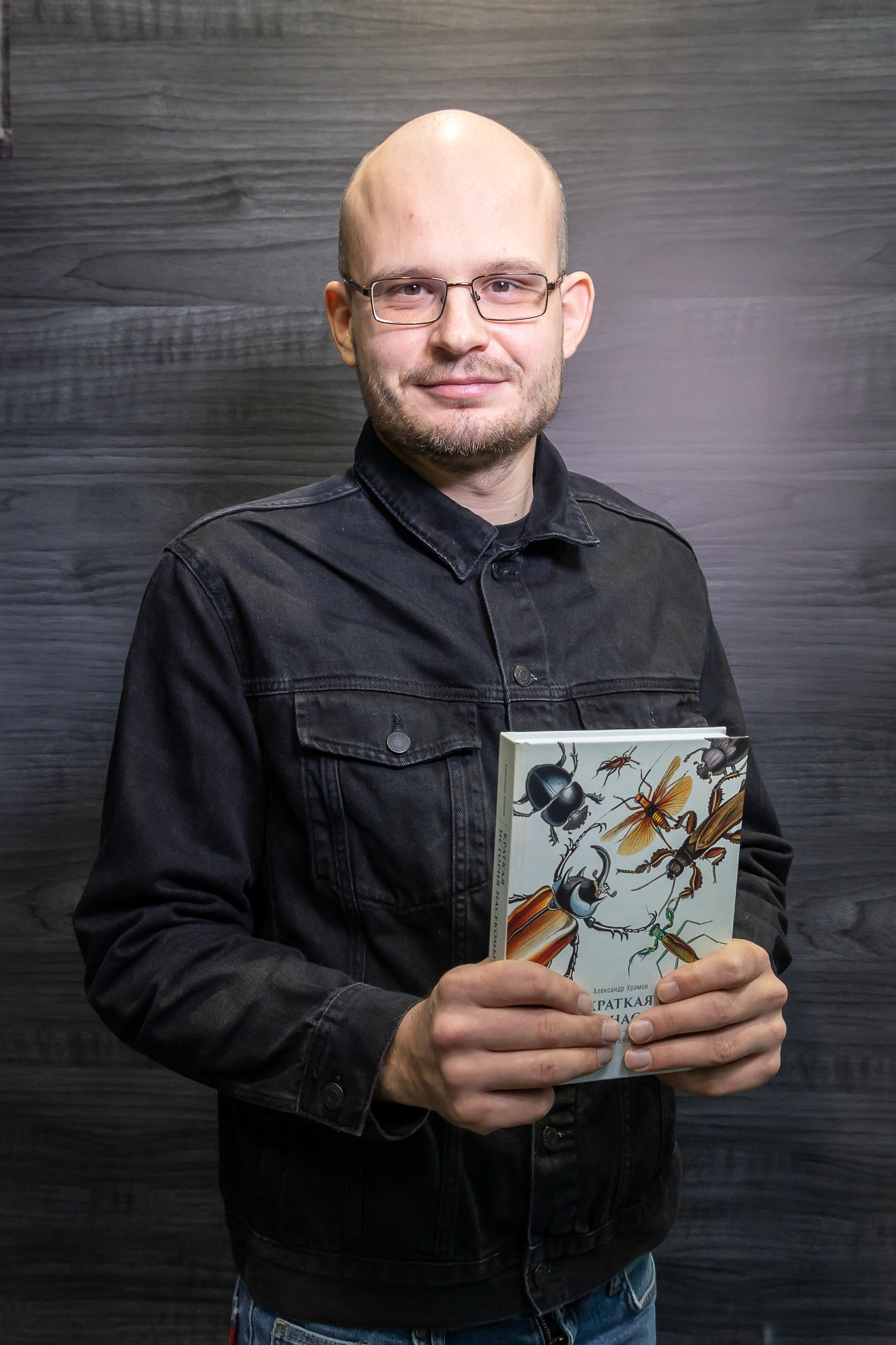
- Alexander Khramov in 2022
- Born: May 7, 1989 (age 37); Moscow, Russia
- Education: Candidate of Biological Sciences
- Alma mater: Moscow State University
- Scientific career
- Fields: Paleontology
- Workplaces: Senior Researcher at the Paleontological Institute, Russian Academy of Sciences
- Thesis: Jurassic Neuroptera of Central Asia (2015)
- Website: https://a-khramov.ru/

Alexander Valeryevich Khramov (Russian: Александр Валерьевич Храмов; born 7 May 1989), also spelled Aleksandr, is a Russian paleontologist and writer. He is a senior researcher at the Paleontological Institute, Russian Academy of Sciences and writes about politics and theology as well as paleontology. Khramov is the author of three books in Russian and over thirty scientific articles, as well as popular science materials published in National Geographic, Science and Life, Elements.ru, and other periodicals.

== Writing and political activism ==
Khramov is quoted in a February 2023 story with The Guardian as part of a team from Russia and Poland that discovered "fossils of oldest known potential pollinators." In addition to academic and popular work related to paleontology, Khramov writes about paleontology, postcolonial research, the theory of nationalism, the history of the relationship between science and religion, philosophy of science, and Christian theology with articles published in Russian and English for the journals International Journal of Orthodox Theology, Philosophy and Epistemology of Science, Inviolable Reserve, Issues of Nationalism, and State, Religion, Church. Khramov is the author of three books in Russian: Catechesis of the National Democrat (Катехизис национал-демократа) in 2011, Monkey and Adam: Can a Christian be an Evolutionist? (Обезьяна и Адам: Может ли христианин быть эволюционистом?) in 2019, and A Brief History of Insects (Краткая история насекомых) in 2022.

In November 2010, Khramov along with Anton Susov established the Russian Civic Union (Russkii grazhdanskii soiuz or RGS). Igor Torbakov, writing in 2015 for George Washington University’s Demokratizatsiya: The Journal of Post-Soviet Democratization, named Khramov among the leading writers and organizers of the "'Third Wave' of the Russian nationalist movement" that was "the most serious challenge to Russia's powers-that-be" as they argued that "throughout Russian history there existed an eternal contradiction between the mass of Russian people (who served as a principal human resource for empire-building) and a largely cosmopolitan imperial elite."

In 2015, Khramov defended his dissertation «Jurassic Neuroptera of Central Asia» («Юрские сетчатокрылые (Insecta: Neuroptera) Центральной Азии») and became a Candidate of Biological Sciences.

Khramov has defended the idea of a meta-historical human fall. He said in a 2017 article that the Big Bang should not be interpreted as the "first creative act of God" but as the "first cognizable manifestation of the human fall". He was influenced by Russian religious philosophers Nikolai Berdyaev and Evgenii Troubetzkoy and contended that every Christian writer before Augustine believed that all creation was "altered drastically after man's disobedience". Having the fall located outside of the theorized Big Bang means that Khramov considers the entire history of evolution on earth to follow after the human fall as he further argued in his 2019 book.

== Books ==
- Катехизис национал-демократа / Александр Храмов. - Москва : Скименъ, 2011. - 208 с; 84x108/32; ISBN 978-5-901574-96-6
- Обезьяна и Адам : может ли христианин быть эволюционистом? : [2+] / Александр Храмов. - Москва : Никея, 2019. - 212 с. : портр.; 21 см.; ISBN 978-5-91761-902-6
- Краткая история насекомых : шестиногие хозяева планеты : [16+] / Александр Храмов. - Москва : Альпина нон-фикшн : Траектория, 2022. - 452 с. : ил.; 22 см.; ISBN 978-5-00139-667-3 : 1500 экз.
