= The Lamp (magazine) =

Catholic Magazine

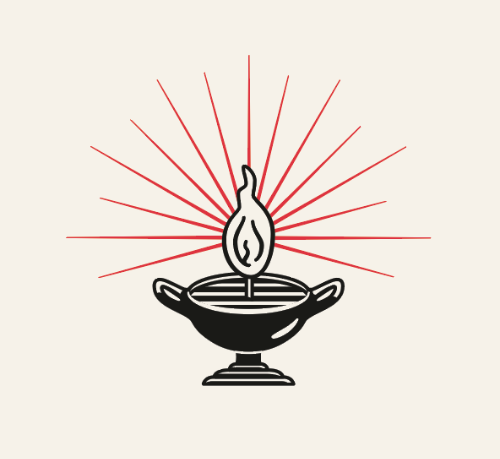
- Publisher: William Borman
- Editor: Matthew Walther
- Contributing Editors: Minoo Dinshaw, Aaron James, Robert Wyllie
- Categories: Catholic, culture, magazine
- Frequency: Bimonthly
- Founder: Matthew Walther, William Borman
- Founded: 2019
- Company: Three Societies Foundation
- Country: United States
- Based in: Three Rivers, Michigan
- Language: English
- Website: www.thelampmagazine.com
- ISSN: 2690-5736

The Lamp is an American bimonthly magazine devoted to literature, culture, and politics from a Catholic perspective. It was founded by Matthew Walther and William Borman.

The magazine regularly features reporting, personal essays, and book reviews on a broad range of topics. It seeks "with reporting, incisive commentary, and coverage of books and the arts to bring the mind of the Church and a generous, urbane spirit to bear on the questions of modern life." The Lamp has been described by The Catholic Spirit, the official newspaper of the Catholic Archdiocese of Saint Paul and Minneapolis, as "a Catholic version of The New Yorker."

The magazine derives its logo from an earlier English Catholic periodical of the same name, published by Thomas Earnshaw Bradley during the Victorian era.

== History ==
Matthew Walther, then a columnist at The Week, founded the magazine along with William Borman after noticing that in an otherwise relatively wide and diverse landscape of Catholic media in the English-speaking world, there was nothing "that is actually a magazine, as opposed to a website or a newswire or what-have-you, that is orthodox." The Lamp seeks to fill that gap, "operating under the assumption that anything that is good, true and beautiful falls within the purview of what should be in a good Catholic magazine."

The magazine's first issue included an essay by Hillbilly Elegy author JD Vance about his conversion to Catholicism. The Lamp regularly features work from prominent writers and public intellectuals, including Giorgio Agamben, Peter Hitchens, Sam Kriss, and David Bentley Hart. The magazine published the final work of Jürgen Habermas.

New York Times columnist Ross Douthat praised the magazine in April 2021 as "Christian journalism that isn't just part of the culture war." In another assessment, Stephanie Slade, managing editor at the libertarian monthly magazine Reason said that her "sense of the world [was] richer" after reading the magazine.
