= All Things Are Full of Gods =

2024 book by David Bentley Hart

- Author: David Bentley Hart
- Language: English
- Genre: philosophical dialogue, philosophy of mind
- Publisher: Yale University Press
- Publication date: February 2024
- Publication place: United States

All Things Are Full of Gods is a 2024 book by philosopher and religious studies scholar David Bentley Hart published by Yale University Press. Its central animating question relates to whether consciousness or matter is ontologically primary — that is, whether mental acts such as memory, intention, and apprehension are reducible to material causes, or whether consciousness precedes or gives rise to material phenomena. Written in the style of a Platonic dialogue among the gods Psyche, Hephaestus, Eros, and Hermes, the book is a dialectic rebuke against the mechanical view of nature that has been ascendent in the West since the Scientific Revolution, and which Hart associates with nihilism and disenchantment. The book's title derives from a statement by the pre-Socratic Greek philosopher Thales.

== Structure and content ==
This story moves through six days of argumentation as agreed upon between the four participants. Eros and Psyche host Hephaestus and Hermes. Hephaestus is the only defender of mechanistic materialism or physicalism over against various more ancient forms of idealism defended by the other three deities.

Hart's deities reference and engage with a variety of religious and philosophic traditions, including neo-Platonism and Hinduism, along with a variety of more modern thinkers including Paul Davies, biologists James A. Shapiro, Denis Noble, Andreas Wagner and Richard Lewontin, geneticist Barbara McClintock, and contemporary philosophers such as Hans Jonas, Raymond Ruyer, Evan Thompson, and Philip Goff.

== Reception ==
All Things Are Full of Gods has received generally positive reviews, with high ratings on platforms such as Goodreads and Amazon.

Writing for the New York Times, Ross Douthat named All Things Are Full of Gods as one of three books in 2024 that advanced compelling philosophical, experiential, or scientific arguments for re-legitimizing religious accounts of reality. Describing it as "the culmination of decades of argument against the new atheists and all reductive accounts of human consciousness", Douthat observed that the book is a daunting read—"not necessarily the best place for a neophyte to start." He praised the dialogue format, which allowed Hart to offer extended elaborations of the materialist and mechanistic view, and then to defeat them soundly.

James Matthew Wilson describes All Things Are Full of Gods as Hart's culminating work rebuking the New Atheists, following his earlier volumes Atheist Delusions and The Experience of God. Wilson writes that it "should be the starting place for all future discussions of the reality of God and the plausibility or implausibility of materialist accounts of existence."

C.W. Howell describes it as "an expansive and mind-opening book", whose arguments take on added relevance amid the rise of Artificial Intelligence and Large Language Models. He praised Hart's decision to present it as a dialogue rather than a treatise, as originally planned, noting that "the dialogue makes the arguments not only easier to follow but easier to remember. They are couched now in the personalities and interests of the characters, which allows space for tension-lightening jokes and whimsy."

In a review for the Church Times, theologian David Brown observed noted that, while by no means a bad book, Hart tends to dismiss Hephaestus' materialist arguments too readily and "in uncomplimentary terms, effectively guiding readers to only one conclusion," which he characterizes as a form of monism.

== See also ==
- Visions
- Socratic dialogue
- Religious studies
