= Hud Hudson =

American philosopher

Education
- Education: University of Rochester (MA, PhD), Boise State University (BA)

Philosophical work
- Era: 21st-century philosophy
- Region: Western philosophy
- Institutions: Western Washington University
- Main interests: philosophy of religion, metaphysics, ethics, Kant
- Website: https://sites.google.com/view/hud-hudson/home

Hud Hudson is an American philosopher and Professor of Philosophy at Western Washington University. He is known for his work on metaphysics.

== Books ==
- Kant's Compatibilism, Cornell University Press, 1994
- A Materialist Metaphysics of the Human Person, Cornell University Press, 2001
- The Metaphysics of Hyperspace, Oxford University Press, 2006
- The Fall and Hypertime, Oxford University Press, 2014
- A Grotesque in the Garden, Eerdmans, 2020
- Fallenness and Flourishing, Oxford University Press, 2021
- Melancholy Theology, Oxford University Press, 2026 (forthcoming)
