= Roland in Moonlight =

2021 autobiographical fairytale by David Bentley Hart

- Cover for Roland in Moonlight with Angelico Press (2021)
- Author: David Bentley Hart
- Language: English
- Genre: philosophical dialogue, fairy tale, memoir
- Publisher: Angelico Press
- Publication date: February 2021
- Publication place: United States

Roland in Moonlight is a 2021 autobiographical fairy tale by philosopher and religious studies scholar David Bentley Hart. Following a narrative framework taken from an eventful period of over a decade in the author's real life, the book consists primarily of dialogues with his dog Roland (d. 2024) as well as accounts of his fictional great uncle Aloysius Bentley (1895–1987). These conversations with Roland at night (often on the border between waking and sleeping) follow in several traditions of philosophical and religious works written in the form of dialogues. The book also features many original poems attributed to the author as well as to both of the fictional characters.

== Structure and form ==
This story moves through four parts, named for four homes that mark stages in the family’s journey from a house on an edenic forested mountain, through two hellish settings, and finally back to a modest garden haven culminating with a scene in “Mama’s garden” (as Roland calls it):

- Part One: Forest
- Part Two: City
- Part Three: Town
- Part Four: Garden
- Coda: The Great Voyage

The final scene in the flower garden tearfully anticipates final farewells and ends with the reading of a poem comprising the "Coda: The Great Voyage." This poem is about a passage beyond this world, and its author is ambiguous (being potentially any of the three main characters: Aloysius, Roland, or David).

Each chapter within these four parts is delineated simply with roman numerals so that this larger structure of four named movements is not obscured. Roland in Moonlight is an expansive book, but Roland as the lead character easily holds together its many narratives and sweeping discourses. Hart experiences the death of both his parents over the years traversed by this story as they lived with him and his family, and readers get many glimpses of suffering and loss. However, the focus remains on Roland: after sharing a few reflections following the death of his mother, Hart quickly returns to his dog and reminds us that “this is Roland’s book” (314). The story introduces us to Roland’s larger-than-life persona (including his status as a bodhisattva who once dwelled in the Tuṣita Heaven as noted on page 29) while still enjoying him as most definitely a dog.

Classicist and religious studies scholar David Armstrong has pointed out that the dialogues are not so much Platonic as Plutarchic and that Roland in Moonlight is an apocalypse.

== Themes ==
Hart and several readers have said in multiple interviews that Hart put everything he had into Roland in Moonlight. There is a theme of suffering alongside of the discoveries and blessings of companionship as Hart faces a life-threatening illness himself along with the death of both his parents who live with Hart and his family during their final years. Woven together with details from everyday life, Hart and Roland delight in and banter over a host of topics including philosophy of mind, consciousness, fairies, world faiths (including Buddhism, Taoism, and Hinduism, especially Vedanta), the fall (of humans and dogs), the Rainbow body, Dreamtime, music, and Mary as the Theotokos (primarily through the poetry of great uncle Aloysius Bentley).

== Reception ==
Roland in Moonlight was chosen by A. N. Wilson as his November 2021 “Book of the Year” for The Times Literary Supplement. Wilson described this "dialogue with the author's dog Roland, who turns out to be a philosopher of mind, with a particular bee in his bonnet about the inadequacy of materialist explanations for 'consciousness'" as "probably the dottiest book of the year" while noting that "I KEEP returning to it."

John Saxbee (former Bishop of Lincoln), describing Roland in Moonlight for a review in Church Times, wrote:

Sometimes, a book defies description or, rather, refuses to settle into a conventional genre. David Bentley Hart’s prodigious mind and imagination has given us just such a book. Perhaps, here, Sophie’s World meets Alice through the Looking-Glass, or Don Quixote meets The Wind in the Willows.

The book was also reviewed in The Los Angeles Review of Books. Others who have praised Roland in Moonlight include Rupert Sheldrake, Mark Vernon, Paul J. Griffiths, Stephen R. L. Clark, Craig Lucas, Brad S. Gregory, and William Desmond.

== Background ==
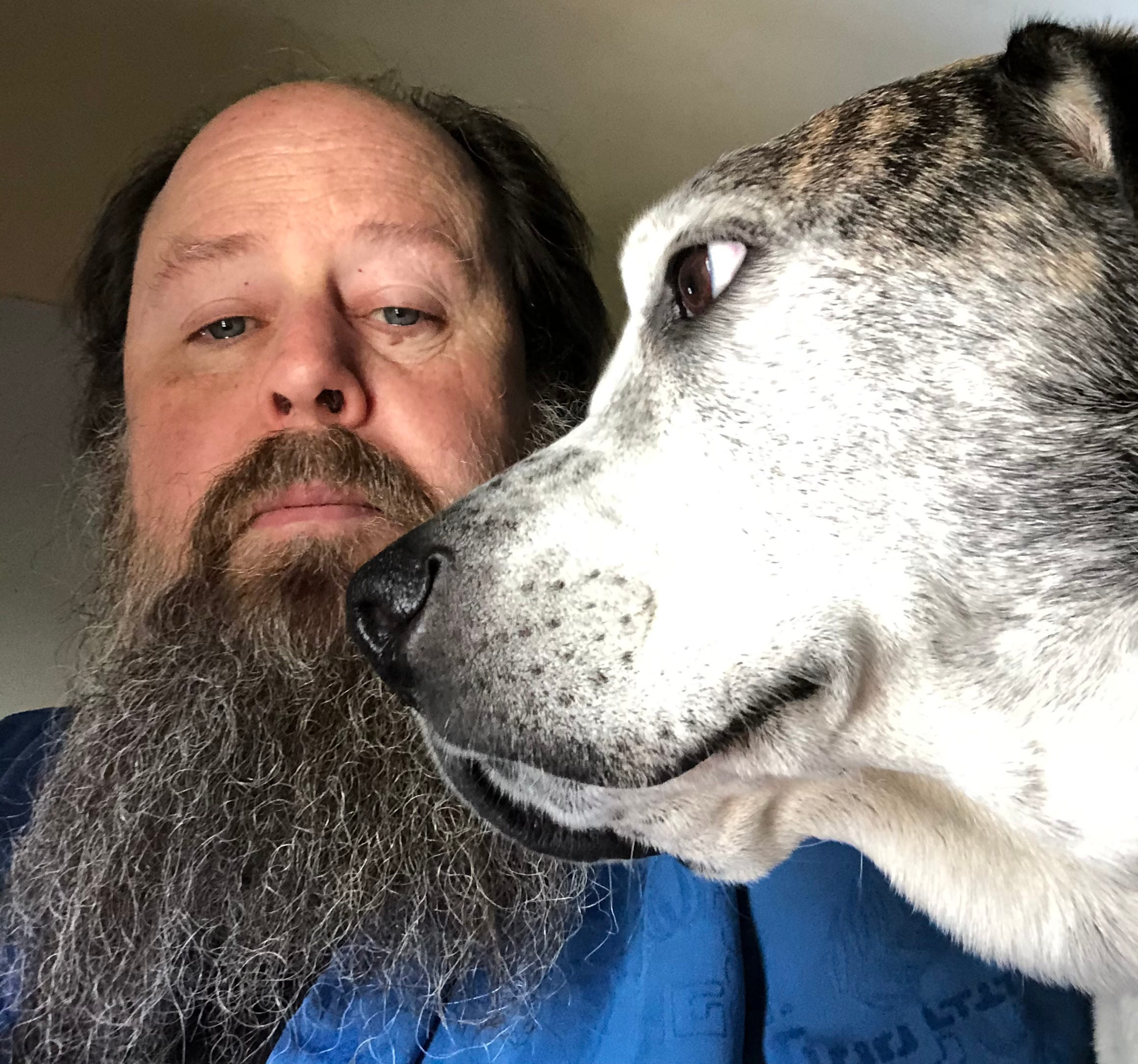
David Bentley Hart and Roland, the title character in Roland in Moonlight (2021).

Before the book's publication, Hart had published previously about both Roland and his fictional great uncle Aloysius Bentley in essay form at First Things: with two about Aloysius in 2011 and six about Roland from 2014 to 2016. In February 2005, Hart wrote "Roland Redivivus" a review of Orlando Innamorato (Orlando in Love) by Matteo Maria Boiardo, and this Roland is noted as the namesake for the family's new puppy in the first paragraphs of Roland in Moonlight.

In addition to these, Hart published a defense in 2015 of there being animals in paradise that involved a debate with a "manualist neo-paleo-neo-Thomists of the baroque persuasion." In this essay, Hart made several references to Roland:

Yes, well, as I say, this young Thomist told me that not only could my dog not love me (since he lacks a rational nature), but I could not love my dog (something about there needing to be some rational equality between lover and beloved). Now, while I admitted that I could only presume the former claim to be incorrect (if only on account of the tender sobriquets—Honeychild, Blossom, Barbarossa—by which my dog addresses me), I was adamant that I could be absolutely certain of the falsity of the latter. But my friend was not deterred: “Oh, no,” he insisted, “you don’t really love him; you just think you do because of your deep emotional attachment to him.” Of course. Foolish of me. Leave it to a two-tier Thomist to devise a definition of love that does not actually involve love. If you can believe in pure nature, I suppose you can believe anything. ...My interlocutor was an adherent to a particularly colorless construal of the beatific vision, one that allows for no real participation of animal creation (except eminently, through us) in the final blessedness of the Kingdom; I, by contrast, hope to see puppies in paradise, and persevere in faith principally for that reason.

Since the publication of his book Roland in Moonlight, Hart has continued to write new dialogues with Roland which have been published on Hart's subscription newsletter Leaves in the Wind.

Roland passed away in May 2024, after the publication of the book.

== See also ==
- Fairy tale
- Memoir
- Visions
- Socratic dialogue
- Philosophy of mind
- Religious studies
- Kenneth Grahame
- Lewis Carroll
