= The Doors of the Sea =

2005 book by David Bentley Hart

- Cover for The Doors of the Sea with Eerdmans (2005)
- Author: David Bentley Hart
- Language: English
- Genre: theology, theodicy, problem of evil, natural evil
- Publisher: Eerdmans
- Publication date: January 2005
- Publication place: United States
- ISBN: 978-0-8028-6686-8

The Doors of the Sea: Where Was God in the Tsunami? is a short book from 2005 about theodicy and the problem of evil by David Bentley Hart, an Orthodox Christian philosopher and religious studies scholar. This book was published after the 2004 tsunami in the Indian Ocean when Hart wrote a column in The Wall Street Journal that attracted wide attention. Bill Eerdmans, of Eerdmans Publishing, contacted Hart and asked him to expand the column into a book which Hart did. The Doors of the Sea has been described by writer and Episcopal priest Fleming Rutledge in Christianity Today as "the most useful short treatment of the problem of evil and suffering that we have."

== Themes ==
Much of the book contrasts the ideas of Voltaire in Candide with those of Dostoevsky in The Brothers Karamazov. The book also references the concept of "fallen time" and of an atemporal fall (where the entire universe is considered to be incomplete and imperfect as a result of a fall that took place outside of time as we now experience it).

Hart's book is not a typical Christian apology for the existence of evil in a world created by a good God. Instead, it primarily critiques any attempts to make such an apology. In The Hedgehog Review, writer and professor Eugene McCarraher calls The Doors of the Sea "a ferocious attack on theodicy in the wake of the previous year’s tsunami." As Hart says on page 58 of the book: "The principal task of theodicy is to explain why paradise is not a logical possibility."

== Reception ==
The Doors of the Sea was widely praised in leading Christian periodicals. A September 20, 2005 review by Tom D'Evelyn in The Christian Science Monitor called the book "timely, eloquent, and unfashionable" with arguments that "are missing from public debate." An October 3, 2005 review by Willis Jenkins in The Christian Century said that the book was a "moving inquiry into the question of evil, one likely to be a classic." On December 5, 2005, a review by Cindy Crosby for Christianity Today concluded:

Hart also takes aim at theologies that argue that suffering reveals divine attributes and allows us to share in Christ's afflictions. He denounces those who say that people deservedly receive punishment or reward and that the suffering of innocents will bear spiritual fruit. He is unnecessarily obtuse in places. However, Hart compellingly argues that this world is only a shadow of a more glorious creation that God intends, a "shattered mirror of divine beauty."

Author and seminary professor Michael D. O'Neil concludes his November 12, 2015 review with this recap:

It is on account of this vision of God that Hart rejects all attempts at theodicy which endeavour to make sense of evil or find a place or purpose for it in the overarching purposes of God. Evil remains evil, so we are permitted to hate it with a perfect hatred.

The Doors of the Sea was also recognized outside of Christian publications with a September 1, 2005 review by Brad S. Matthies in the Library Journal. Another review in Publishers Weekly concluded:

Writing in a sophisticated, academic style—highlighting the philosophical and theological writings of Voltaire, Aquinas, Dostoyevsky and Calvin—Hart asks Christians to allow themselves to be moved and horrified by violence, natural or human-made, and, at the same time, to acknowledge that God can and someday will bring about the Kingdom of Heaven on earth. It's an eloquent and persuasive stance.

Hart's book was also in the top-four winners (Honorable Mention) of the 2005 Foreword INDIES Book of the Year Awards in the category of Philosophy (Adult Nonfiction).

== See also ==
- Christian philosophy
