= David Bentley Hart =

American philosopher and theologian (born 1965)

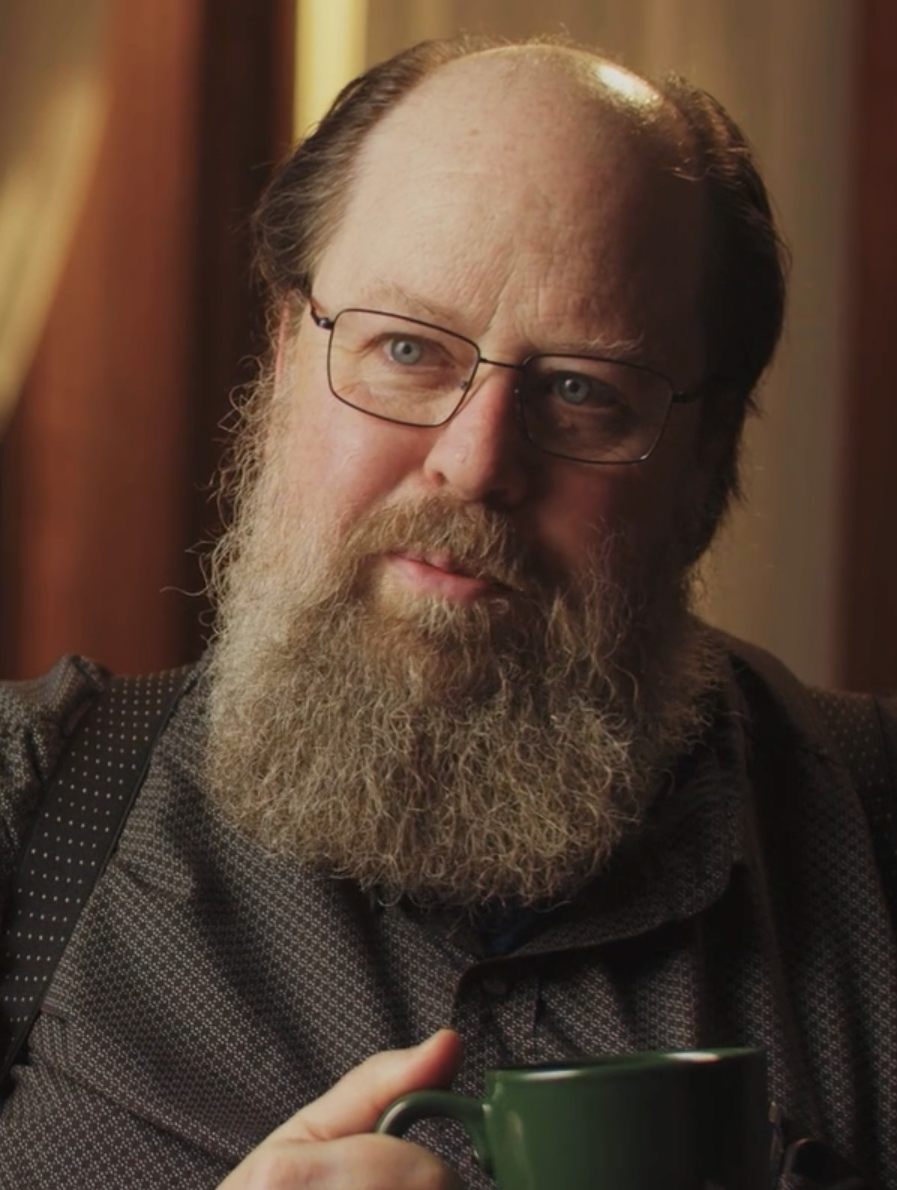
- Hart in 2022
- Born: February 20, 1965 (age 61); Howard County, Maryland, U.S.
- Education: University of Maryland (BA); University of Cambridge (MPhil); University of Virginia (PhD)
- Occupations: Writer; philosopher; religious studies scholar; critic; theologian
- Notable work: See bibliography
- Awards: 2011 Michael Ramsey Prize; 2020 Religion Book of the Year (Publishers Weekly); 2021 Book of the Year (Times Literary Supplement); 2022 and 2020 Gold INDIES (Foreword Magazine); 2022 First place in "Escapism" (Catholic Media Association)

Education
- Thesis: Beauty, Violence, and Infinity: A Question Concerning Christian Rhetoric (1997)
- Doctoral advisor: Robert Louis Wilken (on dissertation committee)

Philosophical work
- School: Classical theism; Neoplatonism; continental philosophy; idealism; Vishishtadvaita; Sophiology
- Institutions: University of Notre Dame
- Main interests: Philosophy of religion Philosophy of mind Oriental philosophy History of philosophy
- Website: davidbentleyhart.substack.com

David Bentley Hart (born February 20, 1965) is an American philosopher, theologian, essayist, fiction author, and religious studies scholar. He is the author of twenty-four books (including translations), as well as over one thousand essays, reviews, and papers. From a predominantly Anglican family background, Hart became Eastern Orthodox when he was twenty-one. His academic works focus on Christian metaphysics, philosophy of mind, Indian and East Asian religion, Asian languages, classics, and literature as well as a New Testament translation. Books with wider audiences include The Doors of the Sea, Atheist Delusions, The Experience of God, That All Shall Be Saved, Roland in Moonlight, A Roland Colonnade, and All Things Are Full of Gods.

Born and raised in Maryland, Hart regularly references his family roots and the Baltimore Orioles in his writing. Hart graduated with a BA in interdisciplinary study from the University of Maryland, completed an MPhil in theology at Cambridge University, and then a PhD in religious studies at the University of Virginia. Hart received the Templeton Fellowship at the University of Notre Dame Institute for Advanced Study in 2015.

Hart's translation of the New Testament was published in 2017 with a second edition in 2023. Five of his books have received awards or book of the year recognitions. Hart has written essays on diverse topics such as art, baseball, literature, consciousness, the problem of evil, apokatastasis, theosis, fairies, film, and politics. Hart maintains a subscription newsletter called Leaves in the Wind that features original essays and conversations with other thinkers.

== Early life ==
Most of his ancestors remained in Maryland for generations after arriving there in 1634. Born in Howard County and graduating from Wilde Lake High School in 1982 with classes in Latin and Greek, Hart was a National Merit Scholar. Hart grew up with two older brothers and writes that this "has always made me feel more like a creature of the 1960s and early 1970s than do some of my friends of roughly my age."

Hart writes that "regional pride dictated that the tender souls of schoolchildren be regularly exposed to the works of H. L. Mencken" and that this shaped his own writing style so that he would spend his life "striving to suppress my assassin's smile while heaping one elaborately vituperative subordinate clause atop another." Outside the high school curriculum, Hart took up French, German, Spanish, Italian, Russian, and modern Greek. At the University of Maryland, Hart studied classics, history, world literature, religious studies and philosophy while also learning to read Chinese and Sanskrit. As a teenager, Hart started to read the early Church Fathers along with contemporary Eastern Orthodox theologians, converting to Orthodoxy at the age of twenty-one.

== Academic career ==
Hart earned a B.A. in interdisciplinary study from the University of Maryland, a M.Phil. in theology from the University of Cambridge, and a Ph.D. in religious studies from the University of Virginia. He taught at the University of Virginia, the University of St. Thomas (Minnesota), Duke Divinity School, and Loyola College in Maryland. He also served as visiting professor at Providence College where he held the Robert J. Randall Chair in Christian Culture. During the 2014–2015 academic year, Hart was Danforth Chair at Saint Louis University in the Department of Theological Studies. In 2015, he was appointed as Templeton Fellow at the University of Notre Dame Institute for Advanced Study. As part of this Templeton Fellowship work, Hart organized a conference focused on the philosophy of mind. In an April 19, 2023 email, Hart noted that he is currently a collaborative research scholar at the University of Notre Dame. His primary areas of research have been philosophical theology, systematics, patristics, classical and continental philosophy, and South and East Asian religion with recent focus on the genealogy of classical and Christian metaphysics, ontology, the metaphysics of the soul, and the philosophy of mind.

Hart has authored twenty books and produced two translated works. The New Testament: A Translation was published in 2017 with Yale University Press and a second edition in 2023. His translation in collaboration with John R. Betz of Analogia Entis: Metaphysics: Original Structure and Universal Rhythm by Erich Przywara was published in 2014 by Eerdmans. Hart's academic books include The Beauty of the Infinite: The Aesthetics of Christian Truth (Eerdmans, 2003), The Experience of God: Being, Consciousness, Bliss (Yale, 2013), The Hidden and the Manifest: Essays in Theology and Metaphysics (Eerdmans, 2017), That All Shall Be Saved: Heaven, Hell, and Universal Salvation (Yale, 2019), Theological Territories: A David Bentley Hart Digest (Notre Dame, 2020), Tradition and Apocalypse: An Essay on the Future of Christian Belief (Baker, 2022), and You Are Gods: On Nature and Supernature (Notre Dame, 2022).

In April and May 2024, Hart delivered the Stanton lectures at the University of Cambridge with presentations across five days entitled "The Light of Tabor: Notes Toward a Monist Christology" which was published as book by Notre Dame the following year. Hart's book All Things Are Full of Gods: The Mysteries of Mind and Life from Yale University Press released in August 2024.

== Literary writing ==
Hart is a cultural commentator and polemicist. Since the late 1990s, Hart has published hundreds of essays on varied subjects including Don Juan, Vladimir Nabokov, Charles Baudelaire, Victor Segalen, Leon Bloy, William Empson, David Jones, The Secret Commonwealth of Elves, Fauns and Fairies (1893), and baseball. These essays have appeared in First Things (2003 to 2020), The New Atlantis, Commonweal, Aeon, The Wall Street Journal, The New York Times, and many other periodicals. Several of these have shaped future books such as The Doors of the Sea, Roland in Moonlight, and Atheist Delusions: The Christian Revolution and Its Fashionable Enemies (Yale, 2009). Since May 2021, Hart also writes regular essays for his Leaves in the Wind subscription newsletter. This newsletter also features conversations with other writers such as Iain McGilchrist, Rainn Wilson, China Miéville, Richard Seymour, Tariq Goddard, and Salley Vickers.

Ed Simon writing for the Los Angeles Review of Books in 2022 said that "Hart is often difficult for some people to categorize" with his "thousands of essays, reviews, and papers" but that "what's agreed upon is that he's wide-ranging and deeply read in his seemingly limitless interests, and loquacious in his refreshingly baroque prose style" as well as "the rare theologian" who can "poetically invoke" beauty with descriptions of color and light. Simon also quoted as "an evaluation with merit" the claim by Matthew Walther that Hart is "our greatest living essayist." Hart's style has been praised for "its thought and humor and spleen" and called "extremely rude." Martyn Wendell Jones has said of Hart's style that, while it may "constantly verge on the immoderate" and rarely "make a point squarely without infusing a bit of accelerant," what might be seen as "needless indulgence" is also "an act of generosity toward his readership" because "his maximalist impulses ...enable him to consistently generate interest on the level of his individual sentences." His essays often mix humor and critical commentary as with "A Person You Flee at Parties: Donald and the Devil" (about Donald Trump from May 6, 2011, for First Things). Hart's essays sometimes explored the boundaries between different religious traditions as with "Saint Sakyamuni" (2009) or the boundaries of orthodoxy as with "Saint Origen" (2015).

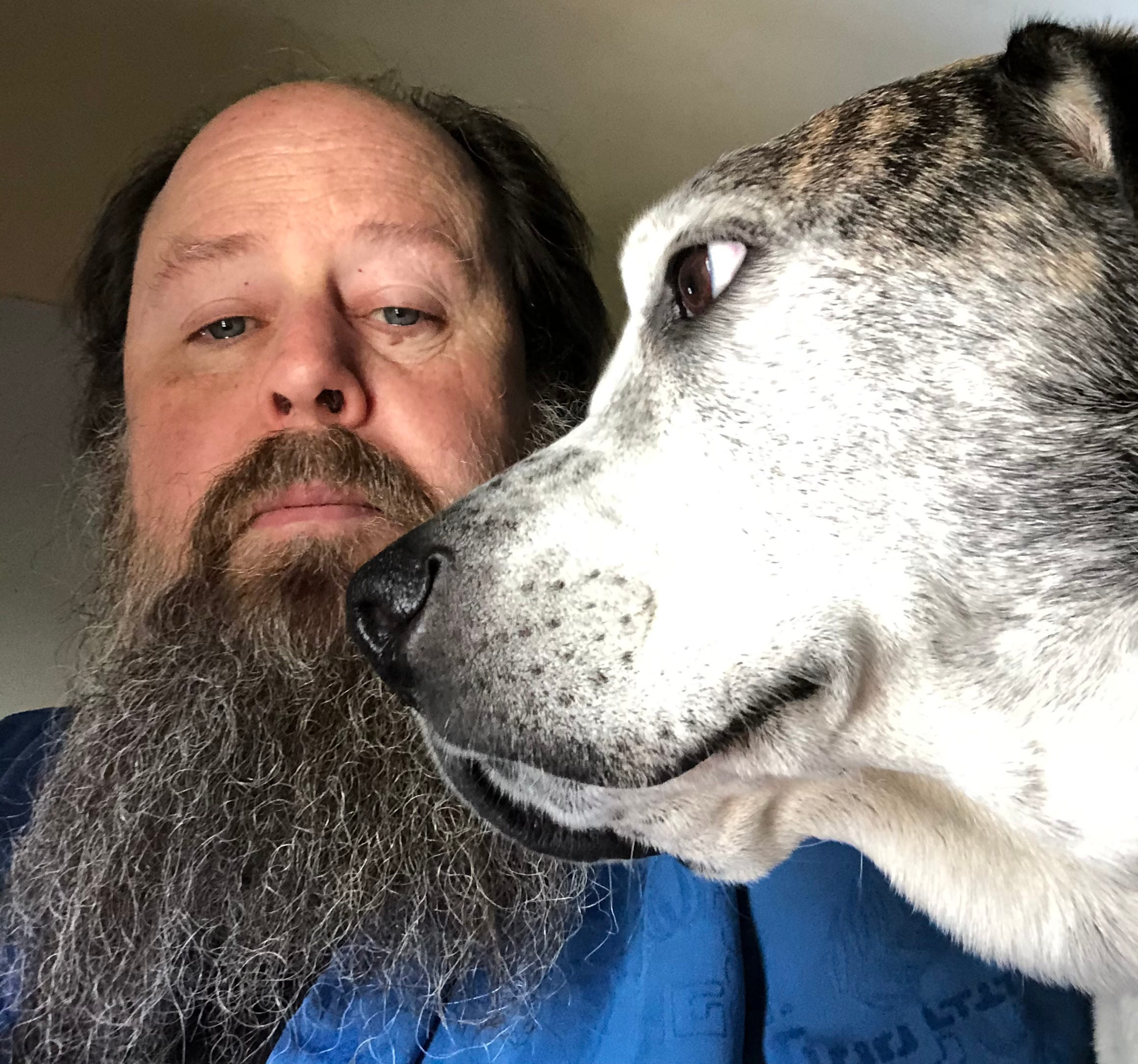
David Bentley Hart and Roland, the title character in Roland in Moonlight (2021)

In 2012, The Devil and Pierre Gernet, a collection of his fiction, was released by Eerdmans. Two of his books, A Splendid Wickedness in 2016 and The Dream-Child's Progress in 2017, are collections devoted to popular and literary essays that also include several short stories. His short stories have been described as "Borgesian" and are elaborate metaphysical fables, full of wordplay, allusion, and structural puzzles. Hart added two books to his fiction works in 2021: Roland in Moonlight and Kenogaia (A Gnostic Tale). His book Roland in Moonlight has a largely autobiographical framework while consisting primarily of dialogs with his dog Roland as well as accounts of his fictional great uncle Aloysius Bentley (1895–1987). Hart had written previously about both Roland and Aloysius in essays for First Things, with two about Aloysius 2011 and six about Roland from 2014 to 2016. Reviewing Roland in Moonlight for a review in Church Times, John Saxbee (former Bishop of Lincoln) wrote that "sometimes, a book defies description or, rather, refuses to settle into a conventional genre" and compared Roland in Moonlight to Sophie's World meets Alice through the Looking-Glass or Don Quixote meets The Wind in the Willows.

== Reception ==
Hart's first major work, The Beauty of the Infinite (2003), is an adaptation of his doctoral thesis. William Placher said of the book, "I can think of no more brilliant work by an American theologian in the past ten years." Geoffrey Wainwright said, "This magnificent and demanding volume should establish David Bentley Hart, around the world no less than in North America, as one of his generation's leading theologians." In 2020, Theological Territories: A David Bentley Hart Digest was named Best Religion Book of the Year by Publishers Weekly as well as winning Gold in the 2020 INDIES with Foreword Magazine. In 2011, Hart's book Atheist Delusions was awarded the Michael Ramsey Prize in Theology by the Archbishop of Canterbury, Rowan Williams. It was also praised by the agnostic philosopher Anthony Kenny in The Times Literary Supplement: "He exposes his opponents' errors of fact or logic with ruthless precision." Oliver Burkeman, writing in The Guardian in January 2014, praised Hart's book The Experience of God as "the one theology book all atheists really should read." You Are Gods won Gold in the 2022 INDIES with Foreword Magazine for the Religion (Adult Nonfiction) category.

Roland in Moonlight was chosen by A. N. Wilson as his November 2021 "Book of the Year" for the Times Literary Supplement. Wilson described this "dialogue with the author's dog Roland, who turns out to be a philosopher of mind, with a particular bee in his bonnet about the inadequacy of materialist explanations for 'consciousness'" as "probably the dottiest book of the year" while noting that "I KEEP returning to it." In 2022, the Catholic Media Association awarded a first place prize to Kenogaia (A Gnostic Tale) in the category of "Escapism" for authors from other traditions.

In addition to these accolades, Hart has been criticized by some scholars including N. T. Wright, Peter Leithart, Edward Feser, and others, especially after his 2019 publication of That All Shall Be Saved. Other Christian scholars praised the book including Robert Louis Wilken who wrote that "Hart shows why most Christian thinking about eternal damnation is unbiblical" and John Behr who described the book as "a brilliant treatment—exegetically, theologically, and philosophically—of the promise that, in the end, all will indeed be saved, and exposing the inadequacy—above all moral—of claims to the contrary." Archbishop Alexander Golitzin of the Orthodox Church in America recorded a public interview on January 14, 2022, in which he named Hart's book That All Shall Be Saved and said that it "draws upon some very prominent and worthy and holy teachers" in the early church who held that the "love of God will ultimately overcome the capacity of the creature to say no to God." In February 2022, the Greek Orthodox Archdiocese of America (in collaboration with the Orthodox Christian Studies Center of Fordham University) invited Hart to deliver a public homily for the Sunday of the Publican & the Pharisee as part of their "Orthodox Scholars Preach" series. In 2017, Hart served on a special commission of Orthodox theologians for the Ecumenical Patriarch Bartholomew I of Constantinople to help compose "For the Life of the World: Toward a Social Ethos of the Orthodox Church" and to coauthor the preface.

== Some noted ideas ==
As indicated by the wide range of topics covered in his essays, Hart has diverse interests such as baseball, comparative religious studies, Gnosticism, metaphysics, The Dreaming, philosophy of mind, theological aesthetics, and world literature. Hart writes often about fairies and has commented several times about his belief in them and related creatures such as mermaids.

As an advocate of classical theism as seen, for example, in his book The Experience of God who is also, more generally, engaged with the schools of continental philosophy, idealism, and neoplatonism, Hart also affirms monism. He said in a November 17, 2020, interview about a pre-release reading of his book You Are Gods that "at the end of the day, I'm a monist as any sane person is" and that "we can play games with it, but any metaphysics that is coherent is ultimately reducible to a monism." In the text of You Are Gods, Hart describes variations of both dualism and monism that he calls grim and monstrous:

An absolute dualism, of course, is a very grim thing indeed; but a narrative monism unqualified by any hint of true gnostic detachment, irony, sedition, or doubt—by any proper sense, that is, that the fashion of this world is horribly out of joint, that we are prisoners of delusion, that not every evil can be accounted for as part of divine necessity—turns out to be at least as monstrous.

During an April 2022 conversation with Hart about You Are Gods, John Milbank said we "agree that in fact neoplatonism and Vedanta and Islamic mysticism are monistic" and "that, actually, an emanationism, a monotheism, these are actually the more monistic visions and that, if we've got all these things in Christianity like Trinity, incarnation, grace and deification and so on, these aren't qualifying monism." Instead, Milbank said that Hart's book You Are Gods shows that Christianity is spelling out or expounding monism and monotheism. Robert Lawrence Kuhn, concludes that Hart "constructs an ultimate unified monism, first by showing that consciousness/mind and being/existence are profoundly inseverable" and then by "taking consciousness and being, already one and the same, and unifying it with God, to become, all together, the ultimate one and the same." Kuhn maintains, however, that "this is not pantheism (or panentheism), but based on Hart's Orthodox Christian convictions, a Christological monism".

=== Biblical interpretation ===
Hart's book That All Shall Be Saved was published on September 24, 2019, and makes the case that universalism is the only coherent version of the Christian faith. Although grounded primarily in arguments from Christian metaphysics and moral philosophy, the book also considers biblical exegesis, systematic theology, and historical theology (with extensive references to universalist ideas among Christian patristic figures such as Gregory of Nyssa). Hart, with his characteristic rhetorical provocations, uses terms such as "infernalists" to describe his opponents. This grounding in Christian metaphysics, insistence on universalism being the only true articulation of the Christian gospel, and use of combative rhetoric all combine to make Hart's case for universalism more uncompromising than most previous Christian arguments, and this has led to the use of the term "hard universalism" to describe Hart's position.

Hart refers to the idea of an atemporal fall (also called meta-historical fall) in his 2005 book The Doors of the Sea as well as in "The Devil's March: Creatio ex Nihilo, the Problem of Evil, and a Few Dostoyevskian Meditations":

The fall of rational creation and the conquest of the cosmos by death is something that appears to us nowhere within the course of nature or history; it comes from before and beyond both. We cannot search it out within the closed totality of the damaged world because it belongs to another frame of time, another kind of time, one more real than the time of death. ...It may seem a fabulous claim that we exist in the long grim aftermath of a primeval catastrophe—that this is a broken and wounded world, that cosmic time is a phantom of true time, that we live in an umbratile interval between creation in its fullness and the nothingness from which it was called, and that the universe languishes in bondage to the "powers" and "principalities" of this age, which never cease in their enmity toward the kingdom of God—but it is not a claim that Christians are free to surrender.

Hart has recommended Sergei Bulgakov's 1939 book The Bride of the Lamb as the best exposition of an atemporal fall.

== Some influences ==
Hart has cited a wide variety of inspirations and influences in his writing as well as across his various areas of scholarship in religious studies, philosophy of mind, and Christian metaphysics. With his essay style, Hart has often referenced H. L. Mencken as an influence. As literary influences, Hart and others have noted Lewis Carroll and Kenneth Grahame. As "exemplars" in writing English prose, Hart has noted: Robert Louis Stevenson, Sylvia Townsend Warner, J. A. Baker, Patrick Leigh Fermor, and Vladimir Nabokov.

An Anglican convert to Eastern Orthodoxy, Hart has praised Orthodox thinkers such as Kallistos Ware, Alexander Schmemann, John Meyendorff, and Olivier Clément. Hart has also called Ecumenical Patriarch Bartholomew "one of the hopes of Orthodoxy" and Sergei Bulgakov "the greatest systematic theologian of the twentieth century." Hart has expressed his admiration for sophiology and summarized his own understanding of it in his 2010 foreword to Vladimir Solovyov's Justification of the Good. Among American theologians, Hart has called Robert Jenson the theologian with whom it is "most profitable to struggle." Among contemporary thinkers, Hart's friendship and substantial intellectual common ground with John Milbank has been noted several times by both thinkers.

More broadly, Hart and commentators have noted many other influences and inspirations (some of whom Hart can also criticize severely in certain respects). Among New Testament authors, Hart most frequently references Paul. Greek fathers most often referenced by Hart include Gregory of Nyssa, Isaac of Nineveh, Maximus the Confessor, and Symeon the New Theologian. Among medieval thinkers, Eriugena, Meister Eckhart and Nicholas of Cusa are often extolled by Hart, especially in his 2022 book You Are Gods. Among more recent Christian thinkers, Hart has noted a high regard for George MacDonald. Russian religious philosophers such as Vladimir Solovyov and Nikolai Berdyaev are often praised by Hart along with Russian literary figures like Dostoevsky and Tolstoy. Among Indian religious philosophers, Hart has most regularly referenced Ramanuja and Shankara.

In an August 2023 interview in The Christian Century, during a series of questions related to German higher criticism and modern theology, Hart said that although the "early church fathers were in many respects historical critical readers, to the degree they could be", Hart himself is not engaging in demythologization along the lines of Paul Tillich or Rudolf Bultmann:

I don't deny the historical reality of the resurrection, or even of the empty tomb. I'm not a modern rationalist. For starters, Tillich was a joke. He couldn't have made it as a philosopher, with his watery, middle-Schelling approach to things, and he wrote these huge, vapid books about a religion that he only barely knew anything about. And Bultmann's attempt to reduce everything down to apocalyptic inner illumination simply because the cosmology of the first century doesn't match the cosmology of the 20th—I mean, it's just the Protestant principle reaching its reductio ad absurdum.

== Personal life ==
Hart is married and has one grown son, Patrick, with whom he co-wrote the children's book The Mystery of Castle MacGorilla (Angelico Press, 2019); his wife is British. He has two brothers: Addison Hodges Hart (also an author) and Robert Hart (rector of Saint Benedict's Anglican Catholic Church in Chapel Hill, North Carolina).

As of 2022, Hart lives in South Bend, Indiana, and is asked to serve and contribute by leaders in his Eastern Orthodox tradition such as the Ecumenical Patriarch of Constantinople. He follows contemporary concerns in Eastern Orthodox Christianity such as providing signature number 32 on a "Declaration on the 'Russian World' (Russkii mir) Teaching" criticizing theological justifications for Russia's invasion of Ukraine. During a September 16, 2022, conversation with Rainn Wilson, Hart shared briefly about an "indescribable" past experience of his own on Mount Athos:

I was in this state of spiritual despair, and I also had an encounter. ...So I understand both the difficulty of explaining it and the impossibility of forgetting it, at once, and how it can change your life. But it doesn't come as a set of instructions. It sure as hell didn't turn me into a saint but did actually make me realize that the spiritual dimension of reality is reality.

Even though he identifies with the tradition of Eastern Orthodoxy, in 2025 Hart said that "the best designation I seem able to come up with for describing my general spiritual sensibility is that of 'irreligious Christian'," by which he means "the faith of someone—myself, that is—who has little or no natural aptitude for religious sentiment, enthusiasm, devotion, or ritual observance. ... I have come to accept that I am a thoroughly secular man who happens to believe that Jesus of Nazareth rose from the dead."

Hart is a Christian socialist and a democratic socialist and has been a member of the Democratic Socialists of America. On August 8, 2020, Hart wrote:

I'm basically an anarchist and communalist. I believe that all that lilies of the field nonsense that Jesus preached was more than a daydream; and I think the longing for strict social hierarchy ...as an antidote to modernity is simply a longing for a reprise of the same sins that created modernity.

With a few more specifics, Hart wrote on April 3, 2022:

In my heart of hearts, I want to vote for someone whose entire political philosophy is derived from John Ruskin by way of Kenneth Grahame, with lashings of William Cobbett, Gilbert White, and William Morris; failing that, I want to enjoy the luxury of writing in Wendell Berry on every ballot. But the imminent collapse of the civil order of the entire world doth make pragmatists of us all. I long for the day, however, when I can return to my posture of airily insouciant disdain for the whole system and can again cast votes only for hopeless third party candidates with a clear conscience. But I suspect I will die before that day comes.
