= That All Shall Be Saved =

2019 book by David Bentley Hart

That All Shall Be Saved: Heaven, Hell, and Universal Salvation
- Book cover
- Author: David Bentley Hart
- Language: English
- Subject: Religion; history
- Publisher: Yale University Press
- Publication date: September 24, 2019
- Publication place: United States
- Media type: Print (hardback)
- Pages: 232
- ISBN: 978-0300246223

That All Shall Be Saved: Heaven, Hell, and Universal Salvation is a 2019 book by philosopher and religious studies scholar David Bentley Hart published by Yale University Press. The book argues that "if Christianity taken as a whole is indeed an entirely coherent and credible system of belief, then the universalist understanding of its message is the only one possible." Hart has described the book as a supplement to his The New Testament: A Translation published also by Yale in 2017. The title is a reference to the scriptural statement in 1 Timothy 2:4 that God "intends that all human beings shall be saved." The book was published also as an audiobook narrated by Derek Perkins in 2019, and a paperback edition containing a new preface was released in 2021.

== Content ==
The book consists of 232 pages and is structured in three main parts: "The Question of an Eternal Hell", "Apokatastasis: Four Meditations", and "What May Be Believed". The four meditations contained in the second part are titled as follows: "Who Is God?" "What Is Judgement?" "What Is a Person?" and "What Is Freedom?".

In the introduction, Hart states, "I know I cannot reasonably expect to persuade anyone of anything" as the thesis of the book is "at odds with a body of received opinion so invincibly well-established", but he adds, "If nothing else, this book may provide champions of the dominant view an occasion for honest reflection and scrupulous cerebration and serious analysis." Hart has summarized the book's six chief themes as follows:

The first theme is the possibility of intelligible analogical language about God in theological usage and the danger of what I have called a “contagion of equivocity.” [...] The second theme is the total disjunction of meaning that the idea of an eternal hell necessarily introduces into certain indispensable theological predicates and the destruction this necessarily wreaks on doctrinal coherence. [...] The third theme is the relation between the classical metaphysics of creatio ex nihilo and eschatology. [...] The fourth theme is that of the relation between time and eternity, or between history and the Kingdom, or between this age and the next in biblical eschatology, and whether any synthesis other than a universalist one (and especially one that, like Gregory of Nyssa’s, uses 1 Corinthians 15 as a master key) can hold all of the scriptural evidence together in a way that is not self-defeating. [...] The fifth theme is that of the ontological and moral structure of personhood, and the dependency of personal identity—again, both ontological and moral—on an indissoluble community of souls. [...] The final theme is that of the nature of rational freedom and of its relation to divine transcendence, and the implications this has for the “free will defense” of eternal perdition.

Hart's arguments are primarily philosophical and theological in nature, yet he also invokes biblical and historical support for his view, citing 23 New Testament texts (including the teaching of Paul in Romans 5:18–19 and of Jesus in John 12:32) which he regards as "straightforward doctrinal statements" of universal salvation, and referencing the teaching of various notable early church fathers (including Gregory of Nyssa and Isaac of Nineveh) which he refers to as "the Christian universalists of the Greek and Syrian East".

== Reception ==
That All Shall Be Saved has been a polarizing book since its publication, receiving high commendation from some, and no shortage of criticism from others.

John Behr described it as a "brilliant treatment—exegetically, theologically, and philosophically." John Milbank stated that Hart "calls us back to real orthodoxy, perhaps just in time." Andrew Louth characterized it as "a tightly argued case for universalism". Tom Greggs called it "a genuinely beautiful and irenic book". Other favorable reviewers have lauded it as "a passionate proclamation of the absolute love of God as revealed in Jesus Christ", and "the work of a stirred and unyielding conscience", whose argument is "forceful, analytically clear, and compelling".

Meanwhile, various critics, such as Edward Feser, have characterized the book as an "attack on Christian tradition" full of "vituperative verbiage" or even "heresy".

In the book itself, Hart predicted, "I suspect that those who disagree with my position will either dismiss it or (if they are very boring indeed) try to refute it by reasserting the traditional majority position in any number of very predictable, very shopworn manners." Subsequently, in various publications, Hart has responded in turn to a number of his critics.
