= Atheist Delusions =

2009 book by David Bentley Hart

Atheist Delusions: The Christian Revolution and Its Fashionable Enemies
- Cover of first edition (hardback)
- Author: David Bentley Hart
- Language: English
- Subject: Religion; history
- Publisher: Yale University Press
- Publication date: April 21, 2009
- Publication place: United States
- Media type: Print (hardback)
- Pages: 272
- ISBN: 978-0-300-11190-3
- Dewey Decimal: 909/.09821 22
- LC Class: BR162.3 .H37 2009

Atheist Delusions: The Christian Revolution and Its Fashionable Enemies is a 2009 book by the theologian, philosopher, and cultural commentator David Bentley Hart. The book explores what Hart identifies as historical and popular misconceptions of Christianity's detractors, with early material in the book being especially critical of New Atheism.

== Content ==
While saying that "there are many forms of atheism that I find far more admirable than many forms of Christianity or of religion in general," Hart criticizes New Atheism for being "as contemptible as any other form of dreary fundamentalism" because it "consists entirely in vacuous arguments afloat on oceans of historical ignorance, made turbulent by storms of strident self-righteousness." Hart makes a case for Christianity as the only "true revolution" in history and the Enlightenment as "a reactionary flight back toward a comfortable, but dehumanizing, mental and moral servitude to elemental nature." He explores the role of Christianity and its interactions with other religions, arguing that Christianity differs from religious cults and faiths of the time. He states it has changed, forming the basis of modern culture while dealing with the impact of the gradual decline that began with the separation of church and state, as well as the age of war that he says resulted.

Hart attempts to explain the people, history, events, and reasons behind what he sees as Christianity's rise, achievements, mistakes, and recent decline in the face of materialism and the power struggles of world leaders. Additionally, he aims to debunk what he says are popular historical myths used to attack Christianity.

== Reception ==
Philosopher Anthony Kenny called Hart's book "the most able counsel for the defence in recent years." Writing for Commonweal, poet Michael Robbins described the book as "an unanswerable and frequently hilarious demolition of the shoddy thinking and historical illiteracy of the so-called New Atheists."

On 27 May 2011, the Archbishop of Canterbury, Rowan Williams, awarded the book the Michael Ramsey Prize in Theology.
