= Paul J. Griffiths =

American philosopher

- Born: 12 November 1955 (age 70); London, England
- Spouse: Judith Heyhoe (m. 1975)

Academic background
- Education: University of Oxford; University of Wisconsin–Madison
- Thesis: Indian Buddhist Meditation-Theory (1983)

Academic work
- Discipline: Religious studies; theology
- Sub-discipline: Buddhist studies; philosophical theology
- Institutions: University of Wisconsin–Madison; University of Chicago; University of Notre Dame; University of Illinois at Chicago; Duke University

Paul J. Griffiths (born 1955) is an American theologian. He was the Warren Professor of Catholic Thought at Duke Divinity School.

== Life and career ==
Griffiths was born in London, England, on 12 November 1955. Griffiths has held appointments at the University of Notre Dame, University of Illinois at Chicago, and the University of Chicago. A scholar of Augustine of Hippo, Griffiths' main interests and pursuits are philosophical theology and the philosophy of religion – particularly Christianity and Buddhism. He received a doctorate in Buddhist studies in 1983 from the University of Wisconsin–Madison, and his early works established him as one of the most incisive interpreters of Yogācāra Buddhist philosophy. His works on Buddhism include On Being Mindless (Lasalle, IL: Open Court, 1991) and On Being Buddha (Albany: SUNY Press, 1994). After converting from Anglicanism to Roman Catholicism and accepting the Schmitt Chair of Catholic Studies at UIC, he has largely given up his work in Buddhist studies. His recent books include: Problems of Religious Diversity (Oxford: Blackwell, 2001); Philosophy of Religion: A Reader (co-edited with Charles Taliaferro) (Oxford: Blackwell, 2003); and, Lying: An Augustinian Theology of Duplicity (Grand Rapids: Brazos Press, 2004). His latest book deals with curiositas and the nature of intellectual appetite; its title is: Intellectual Appetite: A Theological Grammar (Catholic University of America Press). According to the faculty pages at Duke Divinity School, Griffiths has published ten books as sole author and seven more as co-author or editor.

== Duke controversy ==
Griffiths resigned from Duke Divinity School in May 2017 after being reprimanded by Duke Divinity School administration. The reprimand stemmed from his response to a faculty-wide mass-email urging members to participate in voluntary Racial Equity training. Griffiths had replied with his own mass-email that called such training "anti-intellectual", that it had "illiberal roots and totalitarian tendencies", and that such "(Re)trainings of intellectuals by bureaucrats and apparatchiks have a long and ignoble history." When disciplinary proceedings began over the professionalism of his conduct, Griffiths sent out another email saying that the proceedings were an effort "not to engage and rebut the views I hold and have expressed about the matters mentioned, but rather to discipline me for having expressed them. …In doing so they act illiberally and anti-intellectually; their action shows totalitarian affinities in its preferred method, which is the veiled use of institutional power." He lambasted those behind the proceedings saying "The convictions that some of my colleagues hold about justice for racial, ethnic, and gender minorities have led them to attempt occupation of a place of unassailably luminous moral probity. That’s a utopia, and those who seek it place themselves outside the space of reason. Once you’ve made that move, those who disagree with you inevitably seem corrupt and dangerous, better removed than argued with, while you seem to yourself beyond criticism. What you do then is discipline your opponents." He called on them to "reconsider, repent, make public apology to me and our colleagues for the damage done, and re-dedicate themselves to the life of the mind."

In an essay about his resignation Griffiths stated that his words and behavior were "in critique of university diversity policies and practices, in support of particular freedoms of expression and thought, and against legal and disciplinary constraints of those freedoms. My university superiors, the dean and the provost, have been at best lukewarm in their support of these freedoms, preferring to them conciliation and accommodation of their opponents." He held that élite universities no longer have "tolerance for argument."

== Buddhist hybrid English ==
Griffiths coined the term Buddhist hybrid English as an analogy to Buddhist Hybrid Sanskrit to designate the often incomprehensible result of attempts to faithfully translate Buddhist texts into English. This effort often involves the creation of entirely new English phrases for Sanskrit, Pali, Tibetan, Chinese, or Japanese phrases, the use of English words in uncharacteristic ways, and heavy reliance on calques.

An example Buddhist Hybrid English phrase is "own-being" to translate Sanskrit svabhāva in contexts where it is used as a technical philosophical term, equivalent to English essence.

== Bibliography ==
=== Books ===
- On Being Mindless (Lasalle, IL: Open Court, 1991)
- On Being Buddha (Albany, NY: SUNY Press, 1994)
- Religious Reading: The Place of Reading in the Practice of Religion (Oxford: Oxford University Press, 1999)
- Problems of Religious Diversity (Oxford: Blackwell, 2001)
- Philosophy of Religion: A Reader (co-edited with Charles Taliaferro) (Oxford: Blackwell, 2003)
- Lying: An Augustinian Theology of Duplicity (Eugene, OR: Wipf & Stock, 2004)
- Intellectual Appetite: A Theological Grammar (Washington, D.C.: Catholic University of America Press, 2009)
- Song of Songs (Brazos Theological Commentary on the Bible) (Grand Rapids, MI: Baker Publishing Group, 2011).
- The Practice of Catholic Theology: A Modest Proposal (Washington, D.C.: The Catholic University of America Press, 2016).
- Christian Flesh (Stanford, CA: Stanford University Press, 2018)
- Regret: A Theology (Notre Dame, IN: University of Notre Dame Press, 2021)
- Why Read Pascal? (Washington, D.C.: The Catholic University of America Press, 2021)
- Israel: A Christian Grammar (Minneapolis, MN: Fortress Press, 2023)

=== Articles ===
- Griffiths, Paul J. (1981). "Buddhist Hybrid English: Some Notes on Philology and Hermeneutics for Buddhologists" The Journal of the International Association of Buddhist Studies 4(2): 17-32

=== Book reviews ===
Year	Review article	Work(s) reviewed
2023	Griffiths, Paul J. (January 2023). "Mourned or lamented?". Commonweal. 150 (1): 54–56. (Note: Online version is titled "The philosophy of mourning".)	Jonathan Lear (2022). Imagining the end : mourning and ethical Life. Harvard University Press.

———————
