= A Letter to Lord Ellenborough =

1812 pamphlet written by Percy Bysshe Shelley

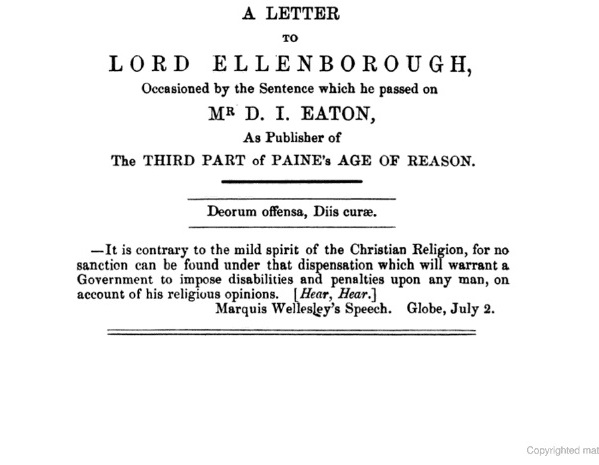
1812 title page.

"A Letter to Lord Ellenborough" is a pamphlet written in 1812 by Percy Bysshe Shelley in defence of Daniel Isaac Eaton. Printed in Barnstaple, the essay is approximately 4,000 words in length.

Shelley defended freedom of speech and criticized the sentencing of publisher Daniel Isaac Eaton. Shelley argued against punishing blasphemous libel maintaining that religious belief is involuntary and that opinions, even if false, should not be prosecuted.

== Arguments advanced in the essay ==
In the essay, Shelley argues for concepts which were then quite radical, including complete freedom of the press, and a tolerance for all published opinion, even when false. The latter, he argued, would "ultimately be controverted by its own falsehood."

The epigraph on the title page is by Tacitus from The Annals, Deorum Offensa, Diis curae. An offense to the gods is rectified by the gods.

A speech by the Marquess Wellesley from July 2 in the Globe is quoted.

In the Advertisement, Shelley wrote that he had waited for four months for someone to attack the sentence but when none was forthcoming, he wrote the letter.

== Origin of the title ==
=== Lord Ellenborough ===
The title arises from the name of the letter's recipient, who directed the jury that convicted Eaton. Eaton had been tried and found guilty of "blasphemous libel", for being an atheist. At the trial before Edward Law, 1st Baron Ellenborough, the Lord Chief Justice of England, what Mark Sandy of the University of Durham has called a "prejudiced jury" convicted Eaton for printing part three of Thomas Paine's The Age of Reason.

=== The trial ===
Daniel Eaton was put on trial in May 1812. During the trial, in which he was accused of being an atheist, as well as the aforementioned "blasphemous libel." In defending himself, Eaton claimed that his beliefs were not atheistic, but deistic. He attempted to argue that scripture was open to the type of critique that Thomas Paine had leveled in The Age of Reason. He based this view on his belief that the god of the Old Testament was "a revengeful and primitive deity", while the Christ of the New Testament was "an exceedingly virtuous, good man, but nothing supernatural or divine."

Despite the paucity of evidence, on 15 May 1812, the Ellenborough-led jury found Eaton guilty. His sentence was severe, including eighteen months in Newgate Prison and a monthly pillorying for the entire term of his sentence.

== Publication history ==
The letter was originally printed in 1812 in Barnstaple by W. Syle, but because they anticipated prosecution, the edition was mostly destroyed, with only 50 copies delivered to London for private distribution. It was published in book form in 1859 in the Shelley Memorials.

It was included in The Prose Works of Percy Bysshe Shelley, Volume 1, edited by Harry Buxton Forman in 1880, published by Reeves and Turner in London.

The letter was republished as Shelley on Blasphemy: Being His Letter to Lord Ellenborough, Occasioned by the Sentence which He Passed on Mr. D. I. Eaton in 1883 in London by the Progressive Publishing Company.

The letter was republished in A letter to Lord Ellenborough: Occasioned by the Sentence Which He Passed on Mr. D.I. Eaton as publisher of the third part of Paine's 'Age of Reason' in 1894 in London by R. Forder.

== Sources ==
- Butler, Marilyn. Romantics, Rebels and Reactionaries: English Literature and its Background, 1760-1830. Oxford University Press, 1982.
- Cameron, Kenneth Neill. "Shelley vs. Southey: New Light on an Old Quarrel." PMLA, Vol. 57, No. 2 (Jun., 1942), pp. 489–512.
- Cameron, Kenneth Neill. "Shelley and the Reformers." ELH, Vol. 12, No. 1 (March, 1945), pp. 62–85.
- Clark, David Lee. "The Dates and Sources of Shelley's Metaphysical, Moral, and Religious Essays." The University of Texas Studies in English, Vol. 28, (1949), pp. 160–194.
- Grimes, Kyle. "'Queen Mab', the Law of Libel, and the Forms of Shelley's Politics." The Journal of English and Germanic Philology, Vol. 94, No. 1 (January, 1995), pp. 1–18.
- Male, Roy R., Jr. "Young Shelley and the Ancient Moralists." Keats-Shelley Journal, Vol. 5, (Winter, 1956), pp. 81–86.
- Shelley, Percy Bysshe. Shelley on Blasphemy: Being his Letter to Lord Ellenborough, occasioned by the sentence which he passed on Mr. D. I. Eaton, as publisher of the third part of Paine's "Age of Reason". London: Progressive Publishing Company, 1883.
- Sotheran, Charles. Percy Bysshe Shelley as a Philosopher and Reformer. Boston, MA: IndyPublish.com, 2006. First published in New York by C.P. Somerby, 1876.
- White, Newman I. "Literature and the Law of Libel: Shelley and the Radicals of 1840-1842." Studies in Philology, Vol. 22, No. 1 (January, 1925), pp. 34–47.
- White, Newman I. "Shelley and the Active Radicals of the Early Nineteenth Century." South Atlantic Quarterly, 29, 1930, pp. 246–261.
