= Deism =

Belief in a God who does not intervene in the universe

Deism (/ˈdiːɪzəm/ DEE-iz-əm or /ˈdeɪ.ɪzəm/ DAY-iz-əm; derived from the Latin term deus, meaning 'god') is the belief that a Supreme Being or God created the universe and that empirical reason and observation of the natural world are exclusively logical, reliable, and sufficient to determine the existence of this creator God. It is a philosophical position and rationalistic theology that rejects prophecies, revelations, and religious texts as legitimate or reliable sources of divine knowledge.

Unlike classical theism, many Deists believe in the existence of a creator God who simply does not intervene anymore after creating the universe, again solely based on rational thought without any reliance on revealed religions or religious authorities. Fundamentally, Deism emphasizes the concept of natural theology—that is, God's existence is revealed through nature itself.

Since the 17th century and during the Age of Enlightenment, especially in 18th-century England, France, and North America, various Western philosophers and theologians formulated a critical rejection of the several religious texts belonging to the many organized religions, and began to appeal only to truths that they felt could be established by reason as the exclusive source of divine knowledge. Such philosophers and theologians were called "Deists", and the philosophical/theological position they advocated is called "Deism".

Deism, as a distinct philosophical and intellectual movement, saw a revival in early-19th century Great Britain and North America. Several tenets of Deism continued as part of other intellectual and spiritual movements, like Unitarianism, and Deistic philosophy continues to have some advocates in the contemporary era.

== Early developments ==
=== History of rationalistic theologies ===
Deistic thinking has existed since ancient times; the roots of Deism can be traced back to the philosophical tradition of Ancient Greece. The ancient Greek philosopher Xenophanes (6th century BC) has been described by scholars as having a one-God theology that projects pandeistic ideals. The ancient Greek philosopher Chrysippus (3rd century BC) affirmed that "the universe itself is God and the universal outpouring of its soul". The Hellenistic philosophical school of Stoicism, which advocated in favor of epistemology and logic, was founded by Zeno of Citium in the 4th century BC. In the 3rd century BC, Chrysippus shaped much of Stoic theology and cosmology. For the Stoics, logic was the part of philosophy to achieve a happy life aligned with nature and the universe. The Stoics held that an understanding of ethics was impossible without the use of logic.

In the 3rd century AD, the schematic Christian theologian and philosopher Clement of Alexandria explicitly mentioned persons who believed that God was not involved in human affairs, and therefore led what he considered a licentious life.

In the early 8th century AD, the Indian scholar, mystic, and theologian Ādi Śaṅkara promoted the Advaita Vedānta school of Hindu philosophy, founded by Śaṅkara himself, which incorporated the metaphysical speculation of the Upaniṣads. He stressed that the individual soul or ultimate self (ātman) is identical to the eternal, unchanging, and formless Brahman, the Vedic conception of the creator God, who is understood as the real observer and cognizer of the universe. Advaita Vedānta also espouses monism, and holds the impersonal Brahman to be unchanging and undifferentiated from the individual self, ātman.

In the mid-8th century AD, the Muʿtazila school emerged as one of the early systematic schools of Islamic theology. Its proponents, the Muʿtazilites, emphasized the use of reason and rational thought, positing that the injunctions of Allāh, the Islamic God, are accessible through rational thought and inquiry, and affirmed that the Qurʾān was created (makhlūq) rather than co-eternal with God, an affirmation that would develop into one of the most contentious questions in the history of Islamic theology.

In the 9th–10th century AD, the Ashʿarī school, founded by the 10th-century Muslim scholar and theologian Abū al-Ḥasan al-Ashʿarī, developed as a response to the Muʿtazilites. Ashʿarītes still taught the use of reason in understanding the Qurʾān, but denied the possibility to deduce moral truths by reasoning. This position was opposed by the Māturīdī school; according to its founder, the 10th-century Muslim scholar and theologian Abū Manṣūr al-Māturīdī, human reason is supposed to acknowledge the existence of a creator (bāriʾ) solely based on rational thought and independently from divine revelation. He shared this conviction with his teacher and predecessor Abū Ḥanīfa al-Nuʿmān (8th century AD), whereas al-Ashʿarī never held such a view. According to the Afghan-American philosopher Sayed Hassan Hussaini, the early schools of Islamic theology and theological beliefs among classical Muslim philosophers are characterized by "a rich color of Deism with a slight disposition toward theism".

In 1250, the Italian Catholic priest, theologian, and philosopher Thomas Aquinas wrote about "an intellectual assent" and reason. He was a proponent of natural theology, while arguing that the Christian God is the source of the light of natural reason and the light of faith. He embraced several rational ideas on God put forward by the ancient Greek philosopher and logician Aristotle (4th century BC) and attempted to synthesize Aristotelian philosophy with the principles of Western Christian theology. Contemporary scholars highlight Aquinas's indebtedness to Aristotle's doctrines, concepts, and method in the formulation of his Trinitarian theology.

Before the rise of Deism in the Age of Enlightenment, a small minority of Christians holding nontrinitarian conceptions of God, largely coming under the headings of Socinianism and Unitarianism, already existed during the early modern period in continental Europe, Great Britain, and the revolutionary United States. These Radical Protestants in continental Europe and English Dissenters in Great Britain and North America affirmed the unitary nature of the Christian God as the singular and unique creator of the universe, believed that Jesus Christ was divinely inspired in his moral teachings and that he is the savior of mankind, but he is not equal to God himself. These nontrinitarian theological movements emerged through a critique of the traditional Christian theology of the Trinity and rejection of non-rational events in the Bible, such as miracles.

=== Definitions ===
The terms deism and theism are both derived from words meaning "god": the Latin term deus and the Ancient Greek term theós (θεός), respectively. The word déiste first appeared in French in 1563 in a theological treatise written by the Swiss Calvinist theologian named Pierre Viret, but Deism was generally unknown in the Kingdom of France until the 1690s, when Pierre Bayle published his famous Dictionnaire Historique et Critique, which contained an article on Viret.

In English, the words deist and theist were originally synonymous, but by the 17th century the terms started to diverge in meaning. The term deist with its current meaning first appears in English in Robert Burton's The Anatomy of Melancholy (1621). However, Deism did not develop into a religio-philosophical movement until after the Scientific Revolution, which began in the mid-16th century in early modern Europe.

=== Herbert of Cherbury and early English Deism ===
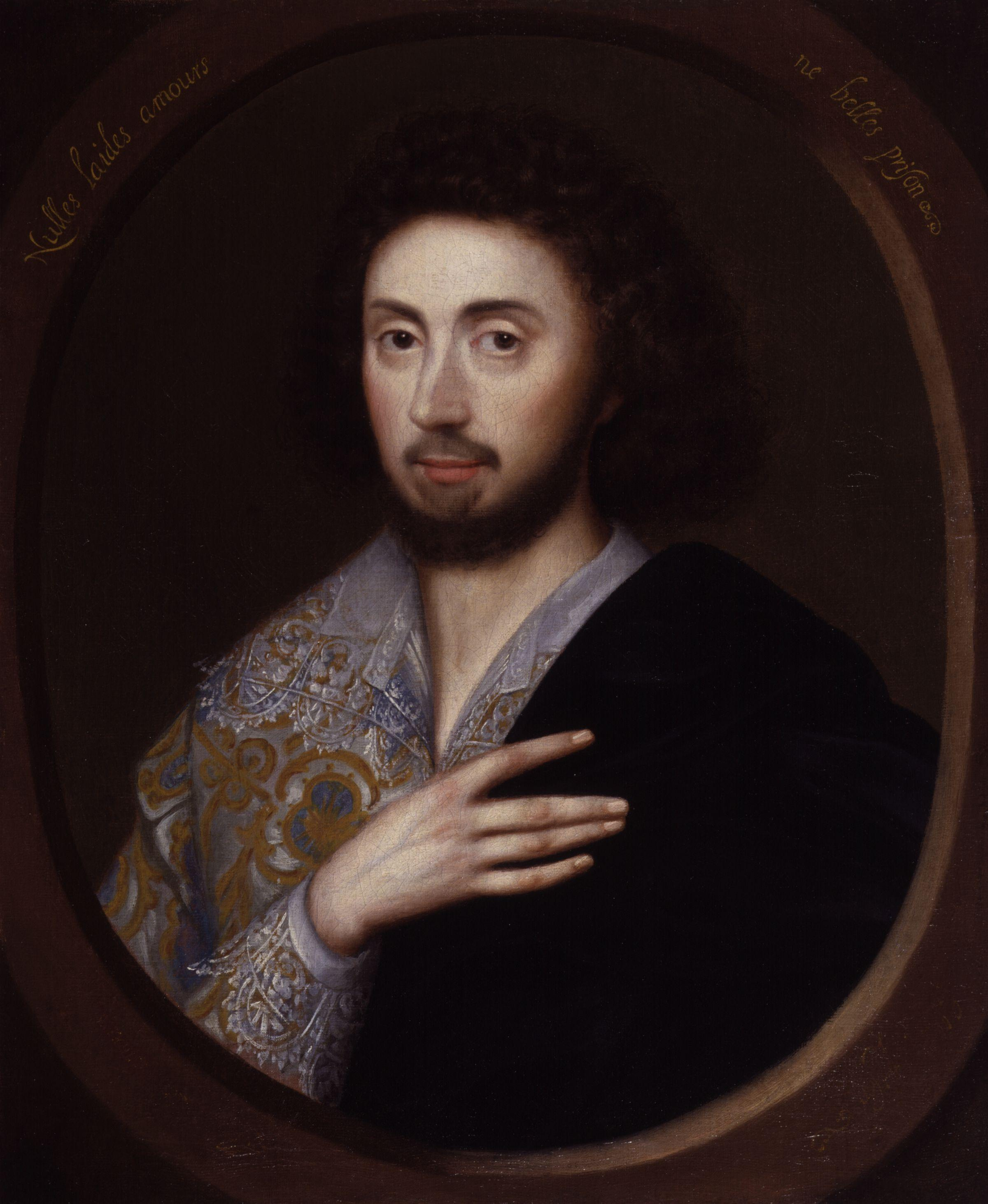
Lord Herbert of Cherbury, portrayed by Isaac Oliver, c. 1603–05

The first major statement of Deism in English literature is Lord Herbert of Cherbury's book De Veritate (1624). Lord Herbert, like his contemporary Descartes, searched for the foundations of knowledge. The first two-thirds of his book De Veritate (On Truth, as It Is Distinguished from Revelation, the Probable, the Possible, and the False) are devoted to an exposition of Herbert's theory of knowledge. Herbert distinguished truths from experience and distinguished reasoning about experience from innate and revealed truths. Innate truths are imprinted on our minds, as evidenced by their universal acceptance. Herbert referred to universally accepted truths as notitiae communes—Common Notions. Herbert believed there were five Common Notions that unify all religious beliefs.

1. There is one Supreme God.
2. God ought to be worshipped.
3. Virtue and piety are the main parts of divine worship.
4. We ought to be remorseful for our sins and repent.
5. Divine goodness dispenses rewards and punishments, both in this life and after it.

Herbert himself had relatively few followers, and it was not until the 1680s that Herbert found a true successor in Charles Blount (1654 – 1693).

=== Peak (1696–1801) ===
The appearance of John Locke's Essay Concerning Human Understanding (1690) marks an important turning-point and new phase in the history of English Deism. Lord Herbert's epistemology was based on the idea of "common notions" (or innate ideas). Locke's Essay was an attack on the foundation of innate ideas. After Locke, deists could no longer appeal to innate ideas as Herbert had done. Instead, deists were forced to turn to arguments based on experience and nature. Under the influence of Newton, they turned to the argument from design as the principal argument for the existence of God.

Peter Gay identifies John Toland's Christianity Not Mysterious (1696), and the "vehement response" it provoked, as the beginning of post-Lockian Deism. Among the notable figures, Gay describes Toland and Matthew Tindal as the best known; however, Gay considered them to be talented publicists rather than philosophers or scholars. He regards Conyers Middleton and Anthony Collins as contributing more to the substance of debate, in contrast with fringe writers such as Thomas Chubb and Thomas Woolston.

Other English Deists prominent during the period include William Wollaston, Charles Blount, Henry St John, 1st Viscount Bolingbroke, and, in the latter part, Peter Annet, Thomas Chubb, and Thomas Morgan. Anthony Ashley-Cooper, 3rd Earl of Shaftesbury was also influential; though not presenting himself as a Deist, he shared many of the deists' key attitudes and is now usually regarded as a Deist.

Especially noteworthy is Matthew Tindal's Christianity as Old as the Creation (1730), which became, very soon after its publication, the focal center of the Deist controversy. Because almost every argument, quotation, and issue raised for decades can be found here, the work is often termed "the Deist's Bible". Following Locke's successful attack on innate ideas, Tindal's "Bible" redefined the foundation of Deistic epistemology as knowledge based on experience or human reason. This effectively widened the gap between traditional Christians and what he called "Christian Deists", since this new foundation required that "revealed" truth be validated through human reason.

== Enlightenment Deism ==
=== Aspects in Enlightenment philosophy ===
Enlightenment Deism consisted of two philosophical assertions: (1) reason, along with features of the natural world, is a valid source of religious knowledge, and (2) revelation is not a valid source of religious knowledge. Different Deist philosophers expanded on these two assertions to create what Leslie Stephen later termed the "constructive" and "critical" aspects of Deism. "Constructive" assertions—assertions that deist writers felt were justified by appeals to reason and features of the natural world (or perhaps were intuitively obvious or common notions)—included:

- God exists and created the universe.
- God gave humans the ability to reason.

"Critical" assertions—assertions that followed from the denial of revelation as a valid source of religious knowledge—were much more numerous, and included:

- Rejection of all books (including the Quran and the Bible) that claimed to contain divine revelation.
- Rejection of the incomprehensible notion of the Trinity and other religious "mysteries".
- Rejection of reports of miracles, prophecies, etc.

==== The origins of religion ====
A central premise of Deism was that the organized religions of their day were corruptions of an original religion that was pure, natural, simple, and rational. Humanity lost this original religion when it was subsequently corrupted by priests who manipulated it for personal gain and for the class interests of the priesthood, and encrusted it with superstitions and "mysteries"—irrational theological doctrines. Deists referred to this manipulation of religious doctrine as "priestcraft", a derogatory term. For Deists, this corruption of natural religion was designed to keep laypeople baffled by "mysteries" and dependent on the priesthood for information about the requirements for salvation. This gave the priesthood a great deal of power, which the Deists believed the priesthood worked to maintain and increase. Deists saw it as their mission to strip away "priestcraft" and "mysteries". Matthew Tindal, perhaps the most prominent Deist writer in early modern Europe, claimed that this was the proper, original role of the Christian Church.

One implication of this premise was that current-day primitive societies, or societies that existed in the distant past, should have religious beliefs less infused with superstitions and closer to those of natural theology. This position became less and less plausible as Enlightenment philosophers such as David Hume began studying the natural history of religion and suggested that the origin of religion was not in reason but in emotions, such as the fear of the unknown.

==== Immortality of the soul ====
Different Deists had different beliefs about the immortality of the soul, about the existence of Hell and damnation to punish the wicked, and the existence of Heaven to reward the virtuous. Anthony Collins, Bolingbroke, Thomas Chubb, and Peter Annet were materialists and either denied or doubted the immortality of the soul. Benjamin Franklin believed in reincarnation or resurrection. Lord Herbert of Cherbury and William Wollaston held that souls exist, survive death, and in the afterlife are rewarded or punished by God for their behavior in life. Thomas Paine believed in the "probability" of the immortality of the soul.

==== Miracles and divine providence ====
The most natural position for Deists was to reject all forms of supernaturalism, including the miracle stories in the Bible. The problem was that the rejection of miracles also seemed to entail the rejection of divine providence (that is, God taking a hand in human affairs), something that many Deists were inclined to accept. Those who believed in a watch-maker God rejected the possibility of miracles and divine providence. They believed that God, after establishing natural laws and setting the cosmos in motion, stepped away. He did not need to keep tinkering with his creation, and the suggestion that he did was insulting. Others, however, firmly believed in divine providence, and so, were reluctantly forced to accept at least the possibility of miracles. God was, after all, all-powerful and could do whatever he wanted including temporarily suspending his own natural laws.

==== Freedom and necessity ====
Enlightenment philosophers under the influence of Newtonian science tended to view the universe as a vast machine, created and set in motion by a creator being, that continues to operate according to natural law without any divine intervention. This view naturally led to what was then called "necessitarianism" (the modern term is "determinism"): the view that everything in the universe—including human behavior—is completely, causally determined by antecedent circumstances and natural law. (See, for example, La Mettrie's L'Homme machine.) As a consequence, debates about freedom versus "necessity" were a regular feature of Enlightenment religious and philosophical discussions. Reflecting the intellectual climate of the time, there were differences among Deists about freedom and determinism. Some, such as Anthony Collins, were actually necessitarians.

=== David Hume ===
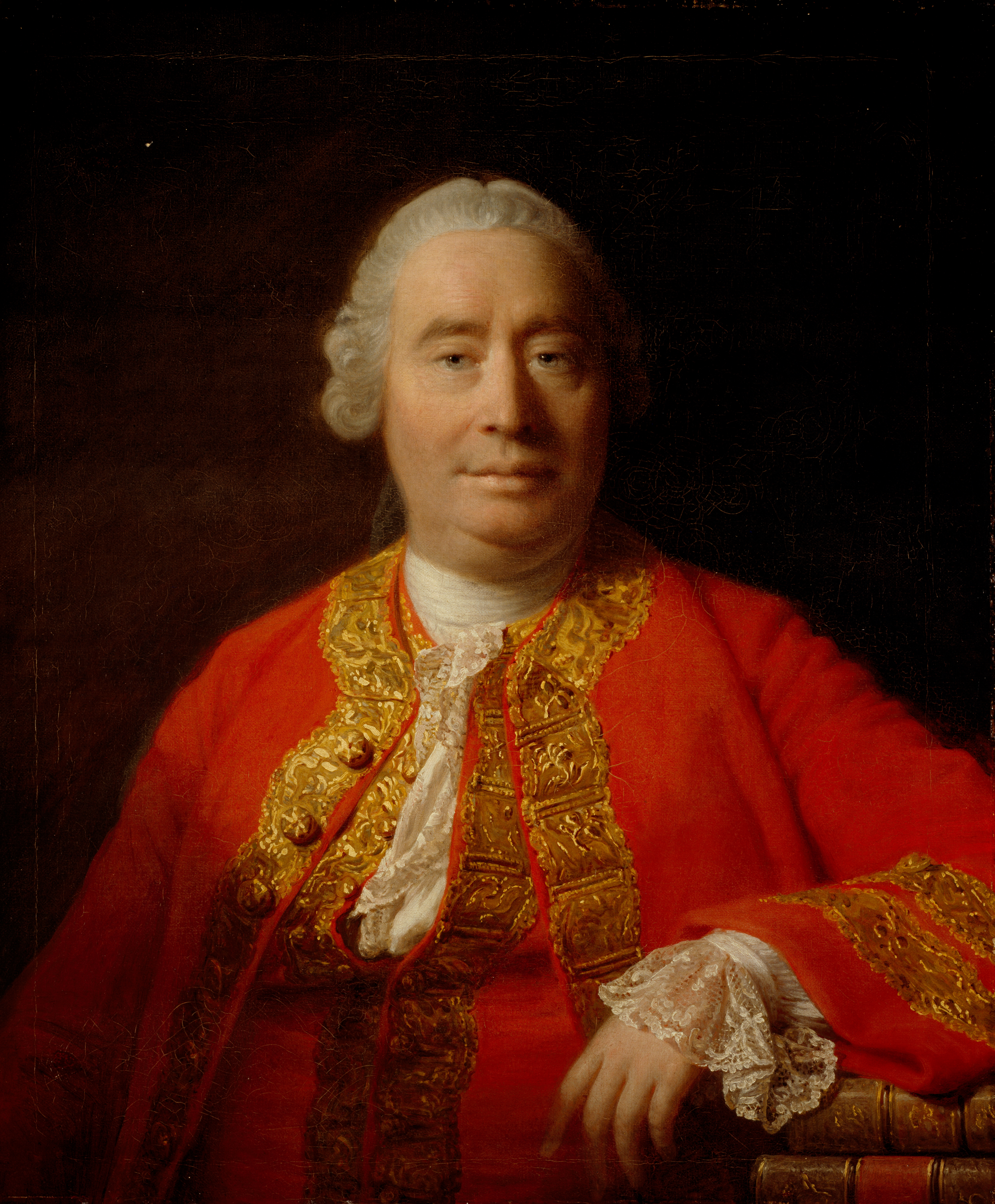
David Hume

Views differ on whether David Hume was a Deist, an atheist, or something else. Like the Deists, Hume rejected revelation, and his famous essay On Miracles provided a powerful argument against belief in miracles. On the other hand, he did not believe that an appeal to Reason could provide any justification for religion. In the essay Natural History of Religion (1757), he contended that polytheism, not monotheism, was "the first and most ancient religion of mankind" and that the psychological basis of religion is not reason, but fear of the unknown. In Waring's words:

The clear reasonableness of natural religion disappeared before a semi-historical look at what can be known about uncivilized man— "a barbarous, necessitous animal," as Hume termed him. Natural religion, if by that term one means the actual religious beliefs and practices of uncivilized peoples, was seen to be a fabric of superstitions. Primitive man was no unspoiled philosopher, clearly seeing the truth of one God. And the history of religion was not, as the deists had implied, retrograde; the widespread phenomenon of superstition was caused less by priestly malice than by man's unreason as he confronted his experience.

=== In the United States ===
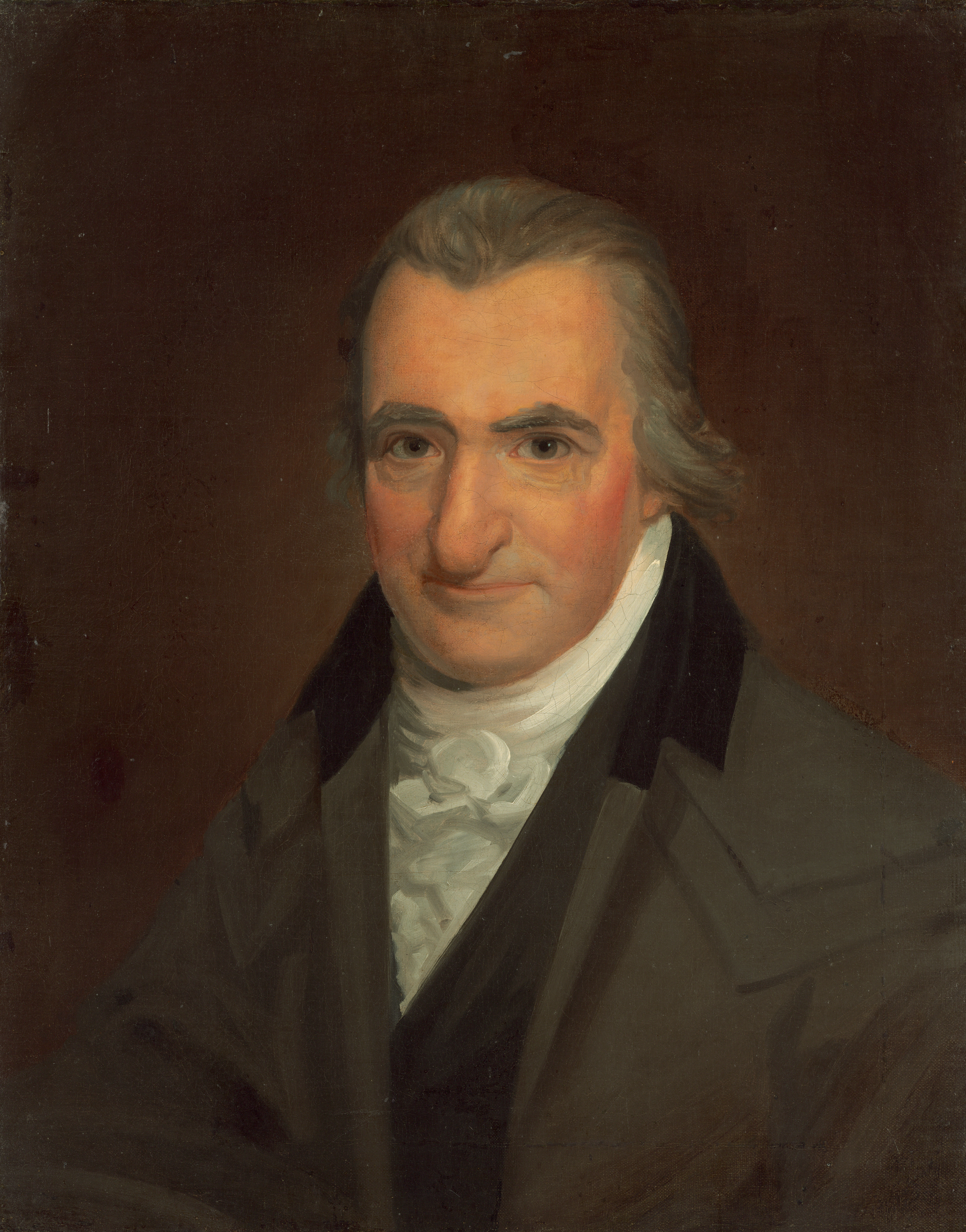
Thomas Paine

The Thirteen Colonies of North America – which became the United States of America after the American Revolution in 1776 – were part of the British Empire, and Americans, as British subjects, were influenced by and participated in the intellectual life of the Kingdom of Great Britain. English Deism was an important influence on the thinking of Thomas Jefferson and the principles of religious freedom asserted in the First Amendment to the United States Constitution. Thomas Jefferson exhibits Deistic principles, though he generally referred to himself as a Unitarian rather than a Deist. His excerpts of the canonical gospels (now commonly known as the Jefferson Bible) strip all supernatural and dogmatic references from the narrative on Jesus' life. Like Franklin, Jefferson believed in God's continuing activity in human affairs.

Thomas Paine is especially noteworthy both for his contributions to the cause of the American Revolution and for his writings in defense of Deism, alongside the criticism of Abrahamic religions. In The Age of Reason (1793–1794) and other writings, he advocated Deism, promoted reason and freethought, and argued against institutionalized religions in general and the Christian doctrine in particular. The Age of Reason was short, readable, and probably the only Deistic treatise that continues to be read and be influential today. Historian Mitch Horowitz noted that, "Colonials, at least those of means, had the capacity to participate in a fraternal order that enshrined and protected the individual spiritual search—and believed that the search belonged to no single congregation, doctrine, or dogma."

Another important contributor to American Deism was Elihu Palmer (1764–1806), who wrote the "Bible of American Deism", Principles of Nature, in 1801. Palmer is noteworthy for attempting to bring some organization to Deism by founding the "Deistical Society of New York" and other Deistic societies from Maine to Georgia.

==== Founding Fathers of the United States ====
A majority of the Founding Fathers of the United States were influenced to various degrees by Deism, including Thomas Jefferson, Ethan Allen, Benjamin Franklin, Cornelius Harnett, Gouverneur Morris, Hugh Williamson, James Madison, John Adams, and possibly Alexander Hamilton. While many of the Founding Fathers are considered Deists, there has been debate on the complex and evolving beliefs of Benjamin Franklin, Thomas Jefferson, and George Washington, particularly as John Adams and Jefferson promoted Unitarian principles denying the Christian trinity and Biblical miracles.

In his Autobiography, Franklin wrote that as a young man "Some books against Deism fell into my hands; they were said to be the substance of sermons preached at Boyle's lectures. It happened that they wrought an effect on me quite contrary to what was intended by them; for the arguments of the Deists, which were quoted to be refuted, appeared to me much stronger than the refutations; in short, I soon became a thorough Deist." Like some other Deists, Franklin believed that, "The Deity sometimes interferes by his particular Providence, and sets aside the Events which would otherwise have been produc'd in the Course of Nature, or by the Free Agency of Man," and at the Constitutional Convention stated that "the longer I live, the more convincing proofs I see of this truth—that God governs in the affairs of men."

John Adams held theologically complex views and seemed to take a middle course between Deism and Calvinism, which led him to Unitarianism. In his later years, Adams moved towards rational Enlightenment ideals, and in a letter dated December 25, 1813, Adams suggested that the Christian Trinity was a "fabrication" derived from Pythagorean and Platonic philosophies rather than divine revelation, and expressed surprise that theologian Joseph Priestley had overlooked these connections to pre-Christian thought. Adams's faith is often described as Christian Deism, since Unitarianism in his time had expanded to include non-theistic schools of thought. He argued that one's salvation depended on behavior rather than belief.

=== In France and continental Europe ===
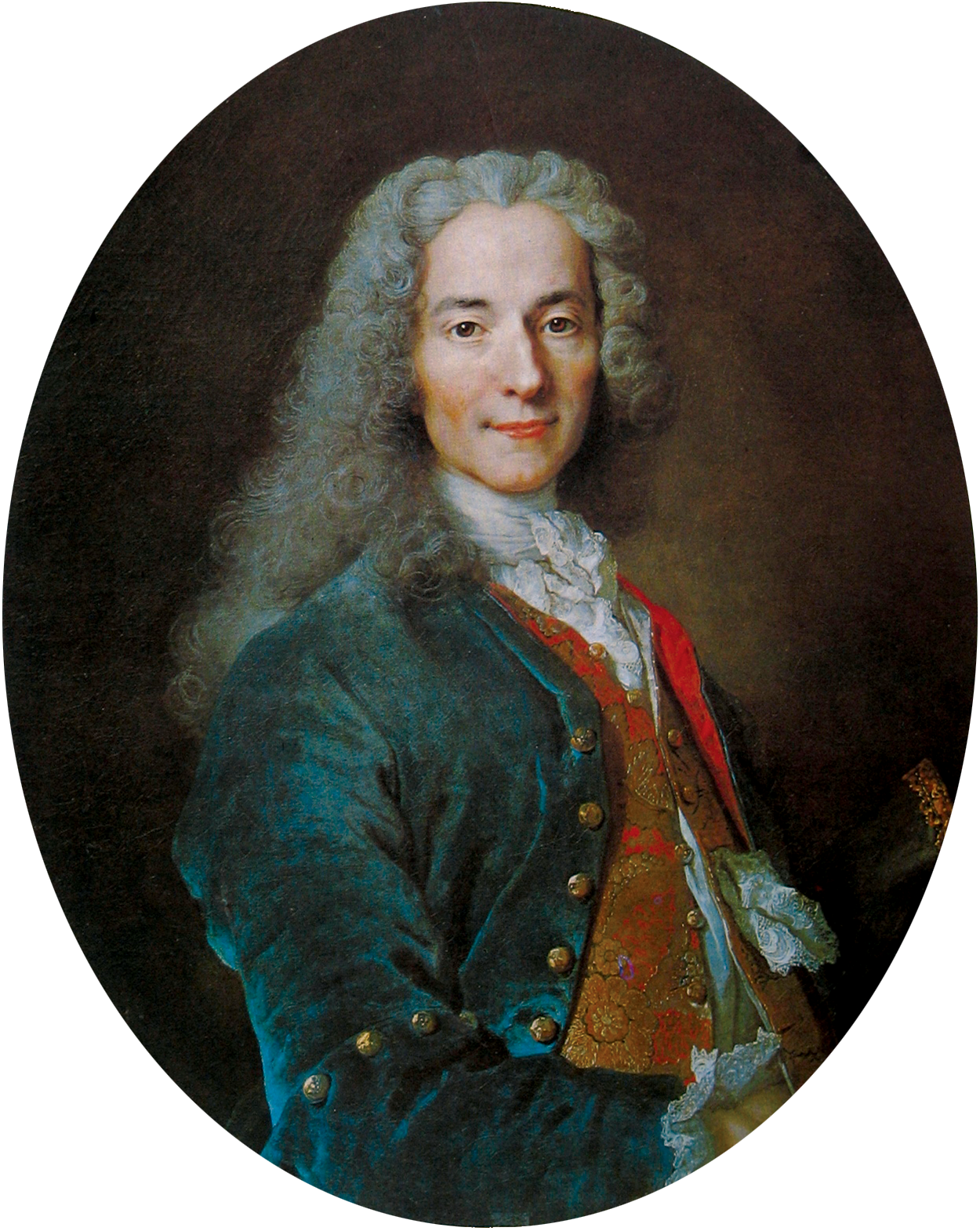
Portrait of Voltaire in the Palace of Versailles, 1724-1725

France had its own tradition of religious skepticism and natural theology in the works of Montaigne, Pierre Bayle, and Montesquieu. The most famous of the French Deists was Voltaire, who was exposed to Newtonian science and English Deism during his two-year period of exile in England (1726–1728). When he returned to France, he brought both back with him, and exposed the French reading public (i.e., the aristocracy) to them, in a number of books.

French Deists also included Maximilien Robespierre and Jean-Jacques Rousseau. During the French Revolution (1789–1799), the Deistic Cult of the Supreme Being—a direct expression of Robespierre's theological views—was established briefly (just under three months) as the new state religion of France, replacing the deposed Catholic Church and the rival atheistic Cult of Reason.

There were over five hundred French Revolutionaries who were deists. These deists do not fit the stereotype of deists because they believed in miracles and often prayed to God. In fact, over seventy of them thought that God miraculously helped the French Revolution win victories over their enemies. Furthermore, over a hundred French Revolutionary deists also wrote prayers and hymns to God. Citizen Devillere was one of the many French Revolutionary deists who believed God did miracles. Devillere said, "God, who conducts our destiny, deigned to concern himself with our dangers. He commanded the spirit of victory to direct the hand of the faithful French, and in a few hours the aristocrats received the attack which we prepared, the wicked ones were destroyed and liberty was avenged."

Deism in Germany is not well documented. We know from correspondence with Voltaire that Frederick the Great was a Deist. Immanuel Kant's identification with Deism is controversial.

=== Decline ===
Peter Gay describes Enlightenment Deism as entering slow decline as a recognizable movement in the 1730s. A number of reasons have been suggested for this decline, including:

- The increasing influence of naturalism and materialism.
- The writings of David Hume and Immanuel Kant raising questions about the ability of reason to address metaphysical questions.
- The violence of the French Revolution.
- Christian revivalist movements, such as Pietism and Methodism (which emphasized a personal relationship with God), along with the rise of anti-rationalist and counter-Enlightenment philosophies such as that of Johann Georg Hamann.

Although Deism has declined in popularity over time, scholars believe that these ideas still have a lingering influence on modern society. One of the major activities of the Deists, biblical criticism, evolved into its own highly technical discipline. Deist rejection of revealed religion evolved into, and contributed to, 19th-century liberal British theology and the rise of Unitarianism.

== Contemporary Deism ==
Contemporary Deism attempts to integrate classical Deism with modern philosophy and the current state of scientific knowledge. This attempt has produced a wide variety of personal beliefs under the broad classification of belief of "deism."

There are a number of subcategories of modern Deism, including monodeism (the default, standard concept of deism), pandeism, panendeism, spiritual deism, process deism, Christian deism, polydeism, scientific deism, and humanistic deism. Some deists see design in nature and purpose in the universe and in their lives. Others see God and the universe in a co-creative process. Some deists view God in classical terms as observing humanity but not directly intervening in our lives, while others see God as a subtle and persuasive spirit who created the world, and then stepped back to observe.

=== Recent philosophical discussions ===
In the 1960s, theologian Charles Hartshorne scrupulously examined and rejected both deism and pandeism (as well as pantheism) in favor of a conception of God whose characteristics included "absolute perfection in some respects, relative perfection in all others" or "AR," writing that this theory "is able consistently to embrace all that is positive in either deism or pandeism," concluding that "panentheistic doctrine contains all of deism and pandeism except their arbitrary negations."

Charles Taylor, in his 2007 book A Secular Age, showed the historical role of Deism, leading to what he calls an "exclusive humanism". This humanism invokes a moral order whose ontic commitment is wholly intra-human with no reference to transcendence. One of the special achievements of such deism-based humanism is that it discloses new, anthropocentric moral sources by which human beings are motivated and empowered to accomplish acts of mutual benefit. This is the province of a buffered, disengaged self, which is the locus of dignity, freedom, and discipline, and is endowed with a sense of human capability. According to Taylor, by the early 19th century this Deism-mediated exclusive humanism developed as an alternative to Christian faith in a personal God and an order of miracles and mystery. Some critics of Deism have accused adherents of facilitating the rise of nihilism.

=== In Nazi Germany ===
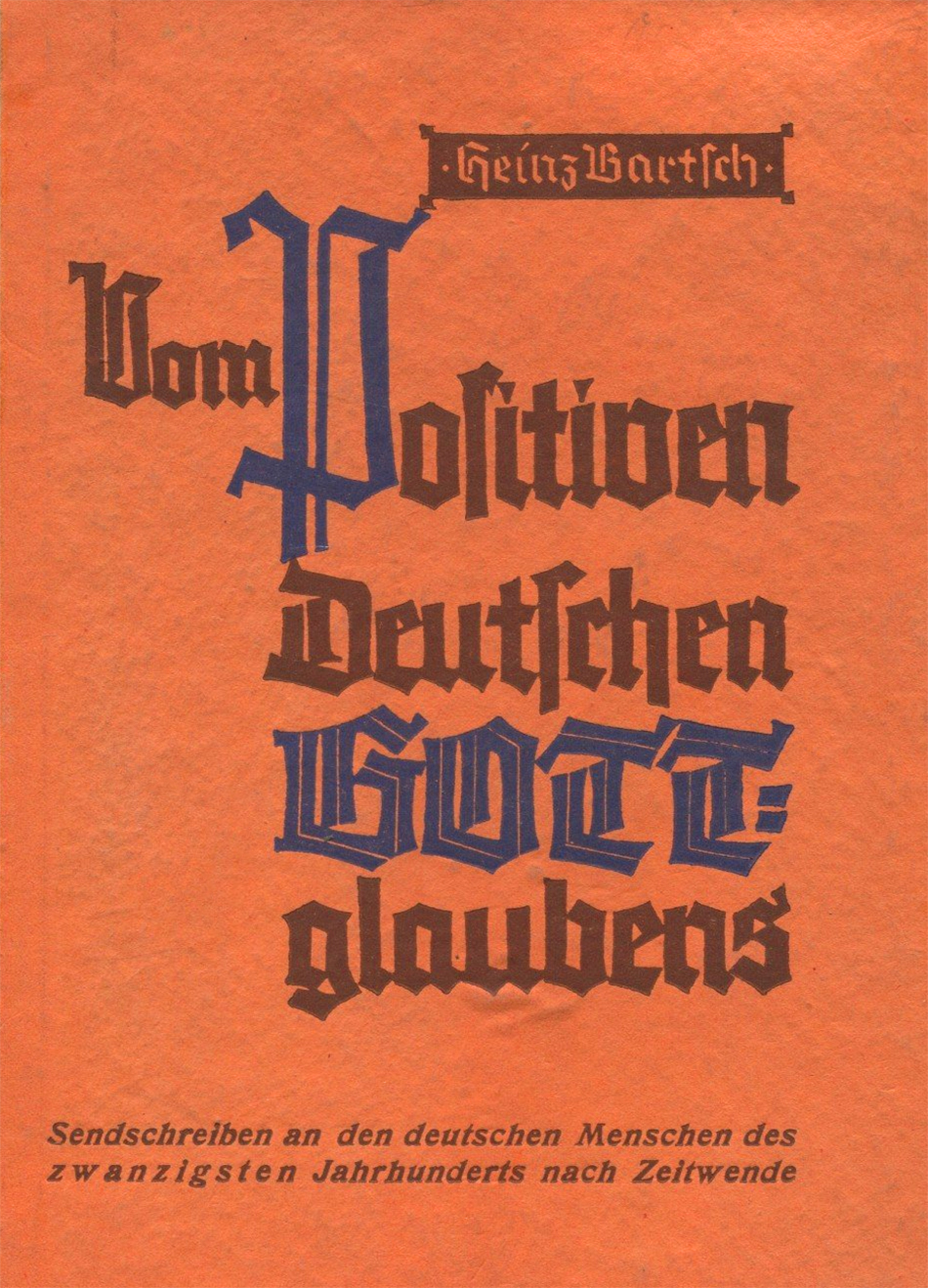
On positive German God-belief (1939)

In Nazi Germany, Gottgläubig (literally: "believing in God") was a Nazi religious term for a form of non-denominationalism practised by those German citizens who had officially left Christian churches but professed faith in some higher power or divine creator. Such people were called Gottgläubige ("believers in God"), and the term for the overall movement was Gottgläubigkeit ("belief in God"); the term denotes someone who still believes in a God, although without having any institutional religious affiliation. These National Socialists were not favourable towards religious institutions of their time, nor did they tolerate atheism of any type within their ranks. The 1943 Philosophical Dictionary defined Gottgläubig as: "official designation for those who profess a specific kind of piety and morality, without being bound to a church denomination, whilst however also rejecting irreligion and godlessness." The Gottgläubigkeit is considered a form of deism, and was "predominantly based on creationist and deistic views".

In the 1920 National Socialist Programme of the National Socialist German Workers' Party (NSDAP), Adolf Hitler first mentioned the phrase "Positive Christianity". The Nazi Party did not wish to tie itself to a particular Christian denomination, but with Christianity in general, and sought freedom of religion for all denominations "so long as they do not endanger its existence or oppose the moral senses of the Germanic race" (point 24). When Hitler and the NSDAP got into power in 1933, they sought to assert state control over the churches, on the one hand through the Reichskonkordat with the Roman Catholic Church, and the forced merger of the German Evangelical Church Confederation into the Protestant Reich Church on the other. This policy seems to have gone relatively well until late 1936, when a "gradual worsening of relations" between the Nazi Party and the churches saw the rise of Kirchenaustritt ("leaving the Church"). Although there was no top-down official directive to revoke church membership, some Nazi Party members started doing so voluntarily and put other members under pressure to follow their example. Those who left the churches were designated as Gottgläubige ("believers in God"), a term officially recognised by the Interior Minister Wilhelm Frick on 26 November 1936. He stressed that the term signified political disassociation from the churches, not an act of religious apostasy. The term "dissident", which some church leavers had used up until then, was associated with being "without belief" (glaubenslos), whilst most of them emphasized that they still believed in a God, and thus required a different word.

A census in May 1939, six years into the Nazi era, and after the annexation of the mostly Catholic Federal State of Austria and mostly Catholic German-occupied Czechoslovakia into German-occupied Europe, indicates that 54% of the population considered itself Protestant, 41% considered itself Catholic, 3.5% self-identified as Gottgläubig, and 1.5% as "atheist".

=== In Turkey ===
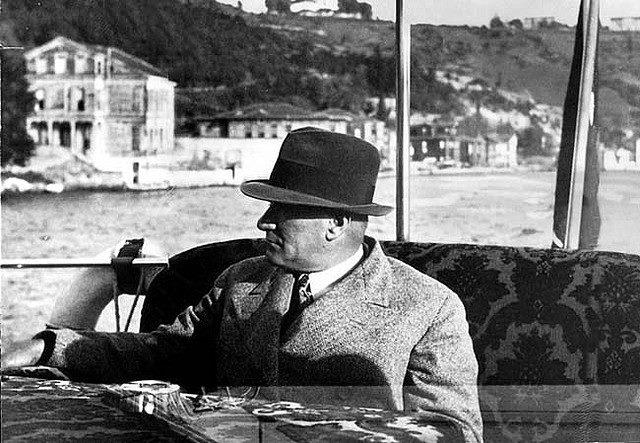
Mustafa Kemal Atatürk, the founding father of the Republic of Turkey, serving as its first president. His reforms modernized Turkey into a secular, industrializing nation.

An early April 2018 report of the Turkish Ministry of Education, titled The Youth is Sliding towards Deism, observed that an increasing number of pupils in İmam Hatip schools was repudiating Islam in favour of Deism (irreligious belief in a creator god). The report's publication generated large-scale controversy in the Turkish press and society at large, as well as amongst conservative Islamic sects, Muslim clerics, and Islamist parties in Turkey.

The progressive Muslim theologian Mustafa Öztürk noted the Deistic trend among Turkish people a year earlier, arguing that the "very archaic, dogmatic notion of religion" held by the majority of those claiming to represent Islam was causing "the new generations [to become] indifferent, even distant, to the Islamic worldview." Despite a lack of reliable statistical data, numerous anecdotes and independent surveys appear to point in this direction. Although some commentators claim that the secularization of Turkey is merely a result of Western influence or even an alleged "conspiracy", other commentators, even some pro-government ones, have come to the conclusion that "the real reason for the loss of faith in Islam is not the West but Turkey itself".

=== In the United States ===
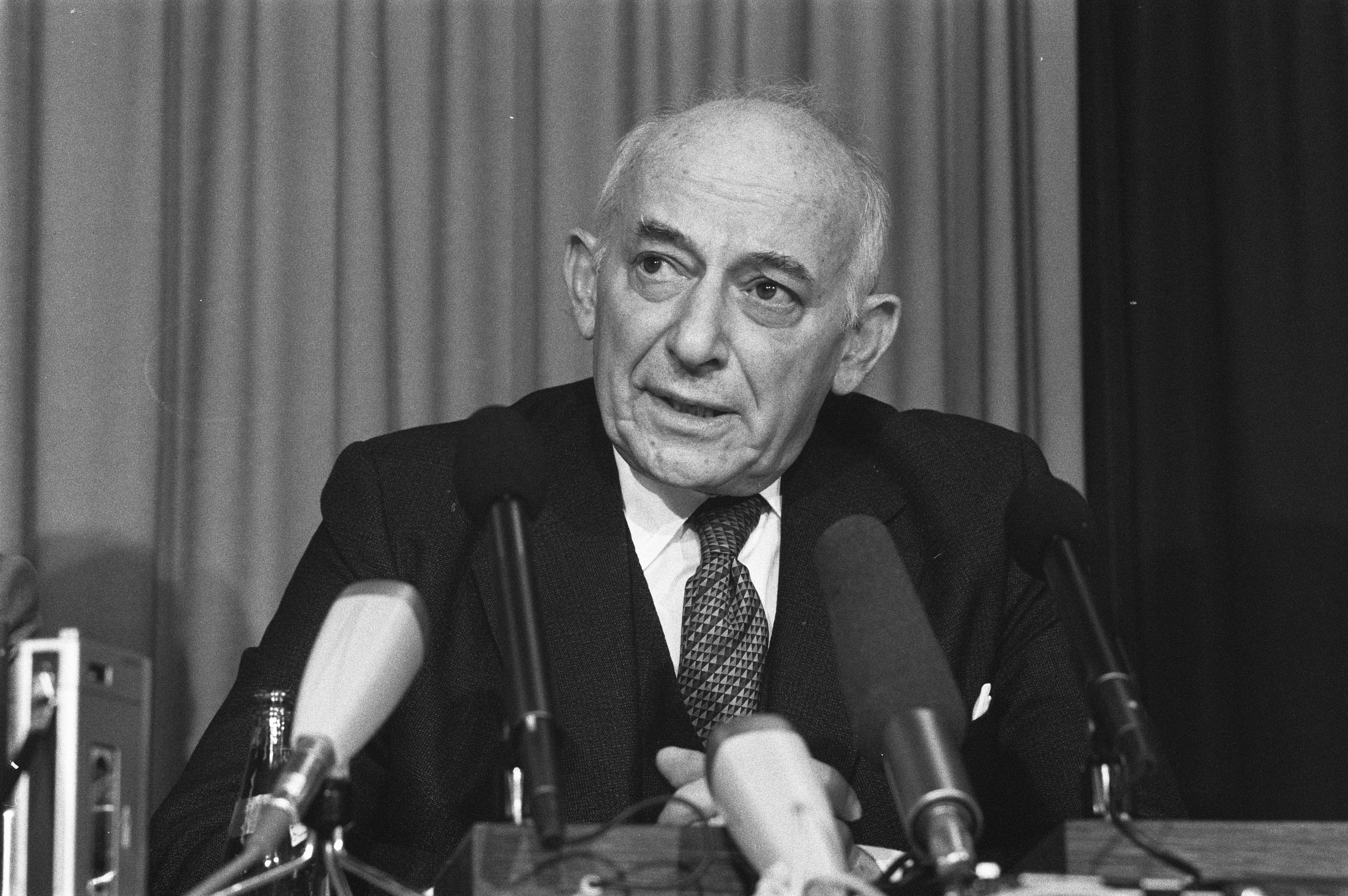
Eugene V. Rostow, who coined the term "ceremonial deism"

Though Deism subsided in the United States post-Enlightenment, it never died out entirely. Thomas Edison, for example, was heavily influenced by Thomas Paine's The Age of Reason. Edison defended Paine's "scientific deism", saying, "He has been called an atheist, but atheist he was not. Paine believed in a supreme intelligence, as representing the idea which other men often express by the name of deity." In 1878, Edison joined the Theosophical Society in New Jersey, but according to its founder, Helena Blavatsky, he was not a very active member. In an October 2, 1910, interview in the New York Times Magazine, Edison stated:

Nature is what we know. We do not know the gods of religions. And nature is not kind, or merciful, or loving. If God made me—the fabled God of the three qualities of which I spoke: mercy, kindness, love—He also made the fish I catch and eat. And where do His mercy, kindness, and love for that fish come in? No; nature made us—nature did it all—not the gods of the religions.

Edison was labeled an atheist for those remarks, and although he did not allow himself to be drawn into the controversy publicly, he clarified himself in a private letter:

You have misunderstood the whole article, because you jumped to the conclusion that it denies the existence of God. There is no such denial, what you call God I call Nature, the Supreme intelligence that rules matter. All the article states is that it is doubtful in my opinion if our intelligence or soul or whatever one may call it lives hereafter as an entity or disperses back again from whence it came, scattered amongst the cells of which we are made.

He also stated, "I do not believe in the God of the theologians; but that there is a Supreme Intelligence I do not doubt."

The 2001 American Religious Identification Survey (ARIS) report estimated that between 1990 and 2001 the number of self-identifying Deists grew from 6,000 to 49,000, representing about 0.02% of the U.S. population at the time. The 2008 ARIS survey found, based on their stated beliefs rather than their religious identification, that 70% of Americans believe in a personal God: (Note: The American Religious Identification Survey (ARIS) report notes that while "[n]o definition was offered of the terms, [they] are usually associated with a 'personal relationship' with Jesus Christ together with a certain view of salvation, scripture, and missionary work" (p. 11).) roughly 12% are atheists or agnostics, and 12% believe in "a deist or paganistic concept of the Divine as a higher power" rather than a personal God.

The term "ceremonial deism" was coined in 1962 by the dean of Yale Law School and American legal scholar Eugene V. Rostow, and has been used since 1984 by the Supreme Court to assess exemptions from the Establishment Clause of the First Amendment to the U.S. Constitution, thought to be expressions of cultural tradition and not earnest invocations of a deity. However, American academic and professor of philosophy Martha Nussbaum remarks that the term does not describe any school of thought within Deism itself.

== See also ==
- American Enlightenment
- Atheism during the Age of Enlightenment
- Deism in England and France in the 18th century
- Deistic evolution
- Demythologization
- God gene
- Great Architect of the Universe
- Irreligion
  - Agnostic theism
  - Apatheism
  - Ietsism
  - Naturalistic pantheism
  - Theological noncognitivism
- Infinitism
- List of deists
- Moralistic therapeutic deism
- Non-physical entity
- Nontheism
  - Creator in Buddhism
  - Nontheistic religion
- Philosophical theism
- Religious affiliations of presidents of the United States
- Religious interpretations of the Big Bang theory
- Religious naturalism
- Spiritual but not religious
- The One (Neoplatonism)
- Theistic rationalism
- Transcendentalism
- Unitarian Universalism
- Unmoved mover
- Urmonotheismus

== Bibliography ==
=== Histories ===
- Betts, C. J. Early Deism in France: From the so-called 'deistes' of Lyon (1564) to Voltaire's 'Lettres philosophiques' (1734) (Martinus Nijhoff, 1984)
- Craig, William Lane. The Historical Argument for the Resurrection of Jesus During the Deist Controversy (Edwin Mellen, 1985)
- Hazard, Paul. European thought in the eighteenth century from Montesquieu to Lessing (1954). pp 393–434.
- Herrick, James A. (1997). The Radical Rhetoric of the English Deists: The Discourse of Skepticism, 1680–1750. U of South Carolina Press.
- Hudson, Wayne. Enlightenment and modernity: The English deists and reform (Routledge, 2015).
- Israel, Jonathan I. Enlightenment contested: philosophy, modernity, and the emancipation of man 1670-1752 (Oxford UP, 2006).
- Lemay, J. A. Leo, ed.Deism, Masonry, and the Enlightenment. Essays Honoring Alfred Owen Aldridge. (U of Delaware Press, 1987).
- Lucci, Diego. Scripture and deism: The biblical criticism of the eighteenth-century British deists (Peter Lang, 2008).
- McKee, David Rice. Simon Tyssot de Patot and the Seventeenth-Century Background of Critical Deism (Johns Hopkins Press, 1941)
- Orr, John. English Deism: Its Roots and Its Fruits (1934)
- Schlereth, Eric R. An Age of Infidels: The Politics of Religious Controversy in the Early United States (U of Pennsylvania Press; 2013) 295 pages; on conflicts between deists and their opponents.
- Willey, Basil. The Eighteenth Century Background: Studies on the Idea of Nature in the Thought of the Period (1940)
- Yoder, Timothy S. Hume on God: Irony, deism and genuine theism (Bloomsbury, 2008).

=== Primary sources ===
- Paine, Thomas (1795). The Age of Reason. Archived from the original on 16 August 2019.
- Palmer, Elihu. The Principles of Nature. Archived from the original on 5 August 2019.
- Deism: An Anthology by Peter Gay (Van Nostrand, 1968)
- Deism and Natural Religion: A Source Book by E. Graham Waring (Frederick Ungar, 1967)
- The American Deists: Voices of Reason & Dissent in the Early Republic by Kerry S. Walters (University of Kansas Press, 1992), which includes an extensive bibliographic essay
- Deism: A Revolution in Religion, A Revolution in You. Archived from the original on 19 April 2009. by Bob Johnson, founder of the World Union of Deists
- God Gave Us Reason, Not Religion. Archived from the original on 29 July 2019. by Bob Johnson
- An Answer to C.S. Lewis' Mere Christianity. Archived from the original on 9 September 2019. by Bob Johnson

=== Secondary sources ===
- Addante, Luca (2019). "Part II: Europe and The Iberian Connection – Unbelief, Deism, and Libertinism in Sixteenth-Century Italy". In García-Arenal, Mercedes; Pastore, Stefania (eds.). From Doubt to Unbelief: Forms of Scepticism in the Iberian World. Studies in Hispanic and Lusophone Cultures. Vol. 42. Cambridge: Modern Humanities Research Association. pp. 107–122. doi:10.2307/j.ctv16km0hq.11. ISBN 978-1-781888-69-8. S2CID 242496485.
- Aldridge, A. Owen (October 1997). "Natural Religion and Deism in America before Ethan Allen and Thomas Paine". The William and Mary Quarterly. 54 (4: Religion in Early America). Williamsburg, Virginia: Omohundro Institute of Early American History and Culture: 835–848. doi:10.2307/2953885. ISSN 1933-7698. JSTOR 2953885.
- Bobzien, Susanne (1996a), "Logic", in Hornblower, Simon; Spawforth, Antony (eds.), The Oxford Classical Dictionary, Oxford University Press, ISBN 978-0-1986-6172-6
- Bonoan, Raoul J. (1992). "The Enlightenment, Deism, and Rizal". Philippine Studies: Historical and Ethnographic Viewpoints. 40 (1). Quezon City: Ateneo de Manila University: 53–67. ISSN 2244-1638. JSTOR 42633293.
- Champion, Justin A. I. (1999). "DEISM". In Popkin, Richard H. (ed.). The Columbia History of Western Philosophy. New York: Columbia University Press. pp. 437–445. ISBN 9780231500340. JSTOR 10.7312/popk10128.70.
- Ericksen, Robert P.; Heschel, Susannah (1999). Betrayal: German Churches and the Holocaust. Minneapolis: Augsberg Fortress. ISBN 978-0-8006-2931-1.
- Hussaini, Sayed Hassan (2016). "Islamic Philosophy between Theism and Deism". Revista Portuguesa de Filosofia. 72 (1: Teísmos: Aportações Filosóficas do Leste e Oeste / Theisms: Philosophical Contributions from the East to the West). Braga: Aletheia - Associação Científica e Cultural: 65–83. doi:10.17990/RPF/2016_72_1_0065. ISSN 0870-5283. JSTOR 43816275.
- Lynch, John (2012). "Religion in the Age of Enlightenment". New Worlds: A Religious History of Latin America. New Haven and London: Yale University Press. pp. 64–105. ISBN 9780300166804. JSTOR j.ctt1npmbn.8. LCCN 2011041757.
- Lyttle, Charles (March 1933). "Deistic Piety in the Cults of the French Revolution". Church History. 2 (1). Cambridge and New York: Cambridge University Press on behalf of the American Society of Church History: 22–40. doi:10.1017/S0009640700120049. ISSN 1755-2613. JSTOR 3691955. S2CID 154689430.
- Perry, Seth (April 2021). "Paine Detected in Mississippi: Slavery, Print Culture, and the Threat of Deism in the Early Republic". The William and Mary Quarterly. 78 (2). Williamsburg, Virginia: Omohundro Institute of Early American History and Culture: 313–338. doi:10.5309/willmaryquar.78.2.0313. ISSN 1933-7698. S2CID 234772508.
- Phillips, III, Russell E.; Pargament, Kenneth I.; Lynn, Quinten K.; Crossley, Craig D. (August 2004). "Self-Directing Religious Coping: A Deistic God, Abandoning God, or No God at All?". Journal for the Scientific Study of Religion. 43 (3). Chichester, West Sussex: Wiley-Blackwell on behalf of the Society for the Scientific Study of Religion: 409–418. doi:10.1111/j.1468-5906.2004.00243.x. ISSN 1468-5906. JSTOR 1387634. S2CID 144102287.
- Piland, Tiffany (2011). The Influence and Legacy of Deism in Eighteenth Century America (MLS thesis). Rollins College.
- Prince, Michael B. (2020). "Defoe's Deist Masterpiece: The Life and Strange Surprizing Adventures of Robinson Crusoe and The Farther Adventures of Robinson Crusoe, 1719". The Shortest Way with Defoe: Robinson Crusoe, Deism, and the Novel. Charlottesville, Virginia: University of Virginia Press. pp. 134–207. doi:10.2307/j.ctvzgb6pp.7. ISBN 9780813943664. S2CID 241840122.
- Sellars, John (2006), Ancient Philosophies: Stoicism, Acumen, ISBN 978-1-84465-053-8
- Shenefelt, Michael; White, Heidi (2013), If A, Then B: How Logic Shaped the World, Columbia University Press, ISBN 978-0-231-53519-9
- Taussig, Harold E. (July 1970). "Deism in Philadelphia During the Age of Franklin". Pennsylvania History: A Journal of Mid-Atlantic Studies. 37 (3). University Park, Pennsylvania: Penn State University Press: 217–236. ISSN 2153-2109. JSTOR 27771874.
