= The Age of Reason =

Work by Thomas Paine, published 1794, 1795 and 1807

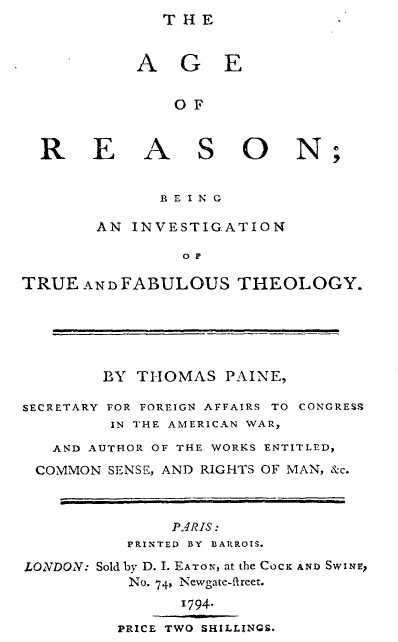
- Title page from the first English edition of Part I
- Author: Thomas Paine
- Publication date: 1794 (Part I); 1795 (Part II); 1807 (Part III)
- Media type: Print
- Text: The Age of Reason at Wikisource

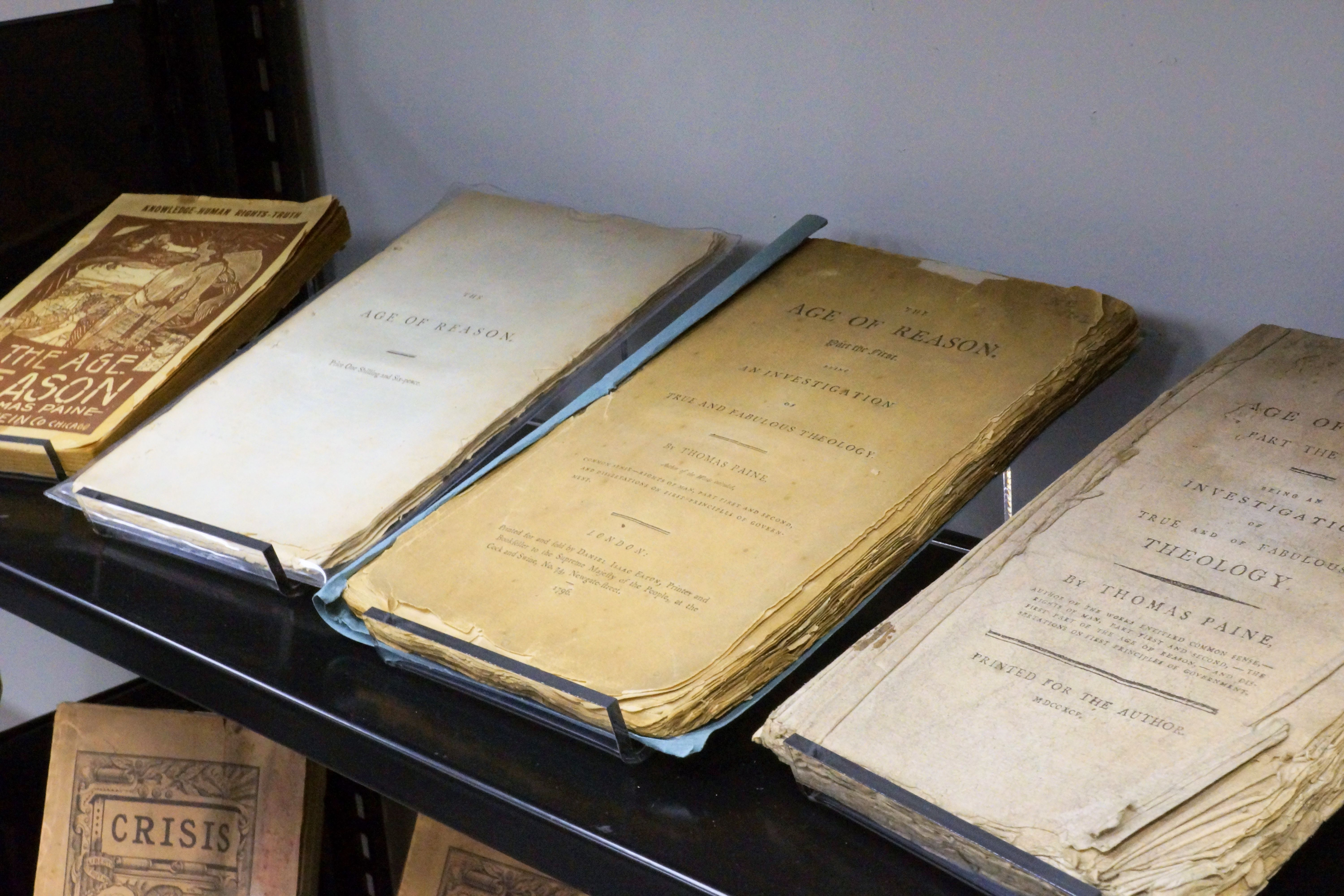
Several early copies of The Age of Reason

The Age of Reason; Being an Investigation of True and Fabulous Theology is a work by English and American political activist Thomas Paine, arguing for the philosophical position of deism. It follows in the tradition of 18th-century British deism, and challenges institutionalized religion and the legitimacy of the Bible. It was published in three parts in 1794, 1795, and 1807.

It was a best-seller in the United States, where it caused a deistic revival. British audiences, fearing increased political radicalism as a result of the French Revolution, received it with more hostility. The Age of Reason presents common deistic arguments; for example, it highlights what Paine saw as corruption of the Christian Church and criticizes its efforts to acquire political power. Paine advocates reason in the place of revelation, leading him to reject miracles and to view the Bible as an ordinary piece of literature, rather than a divinely-inspired text. In The Age of Reason, he promotes natural religion and argues for the existence of a creator God.

Most of Paine's arguments had long been available to the educated elite, but by presenting them in an engaging and irreverent style, he made deism appealing and accessible to the masses. Originally distributed as unbound pamphlets, the book was also cheap, putting it within the reach of a large number of buyers. Fearing the spread of what it viewed as potentially-revolutionary ideas, the British government prosecuted printers and booksellers who tried to publish and distribute it. Nevertheless, Paine's work inspired and guided many free thinkers.

== Historical context ==
=== Intellectual context: 18th-century British deism ===
Paine's book followed in the tradition of early 18th-century British deism. Those deists, while maintaining individual positions, still shared several sets of assumptions and arguments that Paine articulated in The Age of Reason. The most important position that united the early deists was their call for "free rational inquiry" into all subjects, especially religion. Saying that early Christianity was founded on freedom of conscience, they demanded religious toleration and an end to religious persecution. They also demanded that debate rest on reason and rationality. Deists embraced a Newtonian worldview and believed that all things in the universe, even God, must obey the laws of nature. Without a concept of natural law, the deists argued, explanations of the workings of nature would descend into irrationality. This belief in natural law drove their skepticism of miracles. Because miracles had to be observed to be validated, deists rejected the accounts laid out in the Bible of God's miracles and argued that such evidence was neither sufficient nor necessary to prove the existence of God. Along these lines, deistic writings insisted that God, as the first cause or prime mover, had created and designed the universe with natural laws as part of his plan. They held that God does not repeatedly alter his plan by suspending natural laws to intervene (miraculously) in human affairs. Deists also rejected the claim that there was only one revealed religious truth or "one true faith". Religion had to be "simple, apparent, ordinary, and universal" if it was to be the logical product of a benevolent God. They, therefore, distinguished between "revealed religions", which they rejected, such as Christianity, and "natural religion", a set of universal beliefs derived from the natural world that demonstrated God's existence (and so they were not atheists).

While some deists accepted revelation, most argued that revelation's restriction to small groups or even a single person limited its explanatory power. Moreover, many found the Christian revelations in particular to be contradictory and irreconcilable. According to those writers, revelation could reinforce the evidence for God's existence already apparent in the natural world but more often led to superstition among the masses. Most deists argued that priests had deliberately corrupted Christianity for their own gain by promoting the acceptance of miracles, unnecessary rituals, and illogical and dangerous doctrines (accusations typically referred to as "priestcraft"). The worst of the doctrines was original sin. By convincing people that they required a priest's help to overcome their innate sinfulness, deists argued, religious leaders had enslaved the human population. Deists therefore typically viewed themselves as intellectual liberators.

=== Political context: French Revolution ===
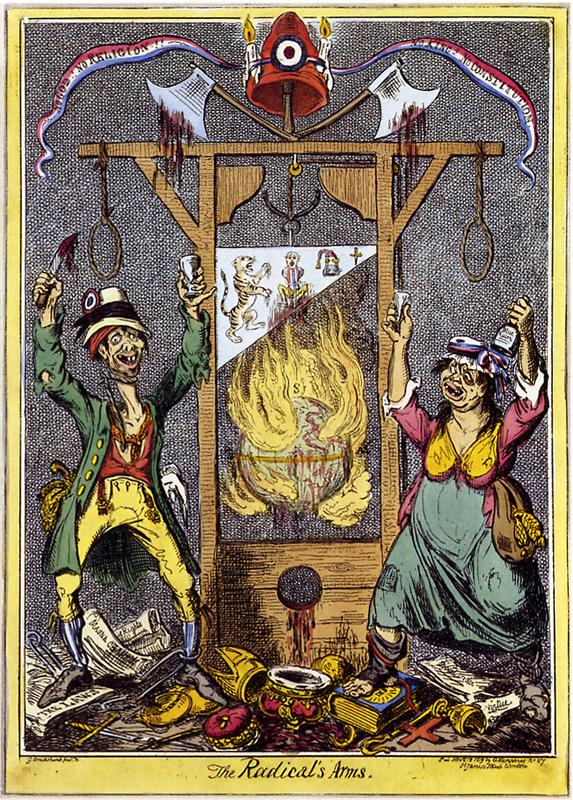
George Cruikshank's The Radical's Arms (1819), pillorying the excesses of the French revolution

By the time Part I of The Age of Reason was published in 1794, many British and French citizens had become disillusioned by the French Revolution. The Reign of Terror had begun, Louis XVI and Marie Antoinette had been tried and executed and Britain was at war with France. The few British radicals who still supported the French revolution and its ideals were viewed with deep suspicion by their countrymen. The Age of Reason belongs to the later, more radical, stage of the British political reform movement, which openly embraced republicanism and sometimes atheism and was exemplified by such texts as William Godwin's Enquiry Concerning Political Justice (1793). (However, Paine and other deists were not atheists.) By the middle of the decade, the moderate voices had disappeared: Richard Price, the Dissenting minister whose sermon on political liberty had prompted Edmund Burke's Reflections on the Revolution in France (1790), had died in 1791, and Joseph Priestley had been forced to flee to America after a Church–and–King mob burned down his home and church.

The conservative government, headed by William Pitt, responded to the increasing radicalization by prosecuting several reformers for seditious libel and treason in the famous 1794 Treason Trials. Following the trials and an attack on George III, conservatives were successful in passing the Seditious Meetings Act and the Treasonable Practices Act (also known as the "Two Acts" or the "gagging acts"). The 1795 Acts prohibited freedom of assembly for groups such as the radical London Corresponding Society (LCS) and encouraged indictments against radicals for "libelous and seditious" statements. Afraid of prosecution and disenchanted with the French Revolution, many reformers drifted away from the cause. The LCS, which had previously unified religious Dissenters and political reformers, fractured when Francis Place and other leaders helped Paine publish The Age of Reason. The society's more religious members withdrew in protest, and the LCS lost around a fifth of its membership.

== Publishing history ==
In December 1792, Paine's Rights of Man, part II, was declared seditious in Britain, and he was forced to flee to France to avoid arrest. Dismayed by the French revolution's turn toward secularism and atheism, he composed Part I of The Age of Reason in 1792 and 1793:

It has been my intention, for several years past, to publish my thoughts upon religion ... The circumstance that has now taken place in France of the total abolition of the whole national order of priesthood, and of everything appertaining to compulsive systems of religion, and compulsive articles of faith, has not only precipitated my intention, but rendered a work of this kind exceedingly necessary, lest in the general wreck of superstition, of false systems of government and false theology, we lose sight of morality, of humanity and of the theology that is true.

Although Paine wrote The Age of Reason for the French, he dedicated it to his "Fellow Citizens of the United States of America", alluding to his bond with the American revolutionaries.

It is unclear when exactly Paine drafted Part I although he wrote in the preface to Part II:

Conceiving ... that I had but a few days of liberty, I sat down and brought the work to a close as speedily as possible; and I had not finished it more than six hours, in the state it has since appeared, before a guard came there, about three in the morning, with an order ... for putting me in arrestation as a foreigner, and conveying me to the prison of the Luxembourg. I contrived, in my way there, to call on Joel Barlow, and I put the Manuscript of the work into his hands ...

According to Paine scholars Edward Davidson and William Scheick, he probably wrote the first draft of Part I in late 1793, but Paine biographer David Hawke argues for a date of early 1793. It is also unclear whether or not a French edition of Part I was published in 1793. François Lanthenas, who translated The Age of Reason into French in 1794, wrote that it was first published in France in 1793, but no book fitting his description has been positively identified. Barlow published the first English edition of The Age of Reason, Part I in 1794 in London, selling it for a mere three pence.

Meanwhile, Paine, considered too moderate by the powerful Jacobin Club of French revolutionaries, was imprisoned for ten months in France. He escaped the guillotine only by accident: the sign marking him out for execution was improperly placed on his cell door. When James Monroe, at that time the new American Minister to France, secured his release in 1794, Paine immediately began work on Part II of The Age of Reason despite his poor health. Part II was first published in a pirated edition by H.D. Symonds in London in October 1795. In 1796, Daniel Isaac Eaton published Parts I and II, and sold them at a cost of one shilling and six pence. (Eaton was later forced to flee to America after being convicted of seditious libel for publishing other radical works.) Paine himself financed the shipping of 15,000 copies of his work to America. Later, Francis Place and Thomas Williams collaborated on an edition, which sold about 2,000 copies. Williams also produced his own edition, but the British government indicted him and confiscated the pamphlets.

In the late 1790s, Paine fled from France to the United States, where he wrote Part III of The Age of Reason: An Examination of the Passages in the New Testament, Quoted from the Old and Called Prophecies Concerning Jesus Christ. Fearing unpleasant and even violent reprisals, Thomas Jefferson convinced him not to publish it in 1802. Five years later, Paine decided to publish despite the backlash he knew would ensue.

Following Williams' sentence of one year's hard labor for publishing The Age of Reason in 1797, no editions were sold openly in Britain until 1818, when Richard Carlile included it in an edition of Paine's complete works. Carlile charged one shilling and sixpence for the work, and the first run of 1,000 copies sold out in a month. He immediately published a second edition of 3,000 copies. Like Williams, he was prosecuted for seditious libel and blasphemous libel. The prosecutions surrounding the printing of The Age of Reason in Britain continued for 30 years after its initial release and encompassed numerous publishers as well as over a hundred booksellers.

== Structure and major arguments ==
The Age of Reason is divided into three sections. In Part I, Paine outlines his major arguments and personal creed. In Parts II and III he analyzes specific portions of the Bible to demonstrate that it is not the revealed word of God.

=== Analysis ===
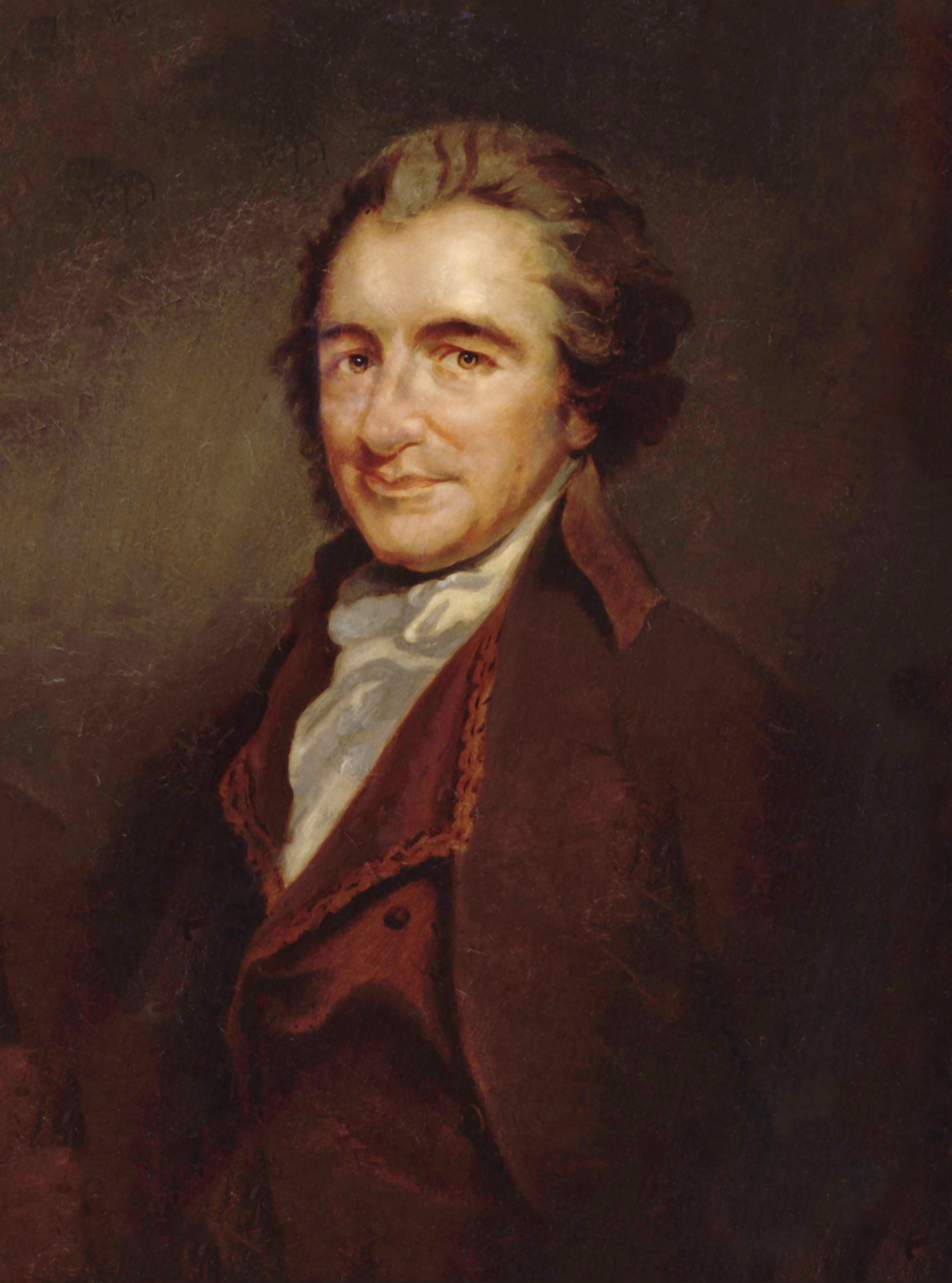
An oil painting of Thomas Paine by Auguste Millière (1880), after an engraving by William Sharp, after a portrait by George Romney (1792)

At the beginning of Part I of the Age of Reason, Paine lays out his personal belief:

I believe in one God, and no more; and I hope for happiness beyond this life.

I believe in the equality of man; and I believe that religious duties consist in doing justice, loving mercy, and endeavouring to make our fellow-creatures happy.

But, lest it should be supposed that I believe many other things in addition to these, I shall, in the progress of this work, declare the things I do not believe, and my reasons for not believing them.

I do not believe in the creed professed by the Jewish Church, by the Roman Church, by the Greek Church, by the Turkish Church, by the Protestant Church, nor by any church that I know of. My own mind is my own church.

All national institutions of churches, whether Jewish, Christian or Turkish, appear to me no other than human inventions, set up to terrify and enslave mankind, and monopolize power and profit.

I do not mean by this declaration to condemn those who believe otherwise; they have the same right to their belief as I have to mine. But it is necessary to the happiness of man that he be mentally faithful to himself. Infidelity does not consist in believing, or in disbelieving; it consists in professing to believe what he does not believe.

Paine's creed encapsulates many of the major themes of the rest of his text: a firm belief in a creator-God; a skepticism regarding most supernatural claims (miracles are specifically mentioned later in the text); a conviction that virtues should be derived from a consideration for others rather than oneself; an animus against corrupt religious institutions; and an emphasis on the individual's right of conscience.

=== Reason and revelation ===
Paine begins The Age of Reason by attacking revelation. Revelation, he maintains, can be verified only by the individual receivers of the message and so is weak evidence for God's existence. Paine rejects prophecies and miracles: "it is revelation to the first person only, and hearsay to every other, and consequently they are not obliged to believe it." He also points out that the Christian revelations appear to have altered over time to adjust for changing political circumstances. Urging his readers to employ reason rather than to rely on revelation, Paine argues that the only reliable, unchanging, and universal evidence of God's existence is the natural world. "The Bible of the Deist," he contends, should not be a human invention, such as the Bible, but rather a divine invention—it should be "creation".

Paine takes that argument even further by maintaining that the same rules of logic and standards of evidence that govern the analysis of secular texts should be applied to the Bible. In Part II of The Age of Reason, he does just that by pointing out numerous contradictions in the Bible. For example, Paine notes, "The most extraordinary of all the things called miracles, related in the New Testament, is that of the devil flying away with Jesus Christ, and carrying him to the top of a high mountain, and to the top of the highest pinnacle of the temple, and showing him and promising to him all the kingdoms of the World. How happened it that he did not discover America, or is it only with kingdoms that his sooty highness has any interest? "

==== Analysis of the Bible ====
After establishing that he would refrain from using extra-Biblical sources to inform his criticism, but would instead apply the Bible's own words against itself, Paine questions the sacredness of the Bible and analyzes it as one would any other book. For example, in his analysis of the Book of Proverbs he argues that its sayings are "inferior in keenness to the proverbs of the Spaniards, and not more wise and economical than those of the American Franklin." Describing the Bible as "fabulous mythology," Paine questions whether or not it was revealed to its writers and doubts that the original writers can ever be known (for example, he dismisses the idea that Moses wrote the Pentateuch or that the Gospel's authors are known).

My intention is to show that those books are spurious, and that Moses is not the author of them; and still further, that they were not written in the time of Moses, nor till several hundred years afterward; that they are no other than an attempted history of the life of Moses, and of the times in which he is said to have lived, and also of the times prior thereto, written by some very ignorant and stupid pretenders to authorship, several hundred years after the death of Moses. ... The books called the Evangelists, and ascribed to Matthew, Mark, Luke, and John, were not written by Matthew, Mark, Luke, and John; ... they have been manufactured, as the books of the Old Testament have been by other persons than those whose names they bear.

Using methods that would not become common in Biblical scholarship until the 19th century, Paine tested the Bible for internal consistency, questioned its historical accuracy, and concluded that it was not divinely inspired. Paine also argues that the Old Testament must be false because it depicts a tyrannical God. The "history of wickedness" pervading the Old Testament convinced Paine that it was simply another set of human-authored myths. He deplores people's credulity: "Brought up in habits of superstition," he wrote, "people in general know not how much wickedness there is in this pretended word of God." Citing Numbers 31:13–47 as an example, in which Moses orders the slaughter of thousands of boys and women and sanctions the rape of thousands of girls at God's behest, Paine calls the Bible a "book of lies, wickedness, and blasphemy; for what can be greater blasphemy than to ascribe the wickedness of man to the orders of the Almighty!"

=== Church and state ===
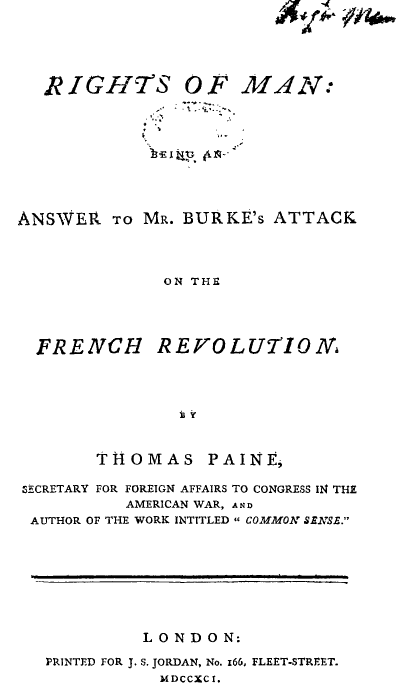
Title page from Paine's Rights of Man (1792)

Paine also attacks religious institutions, indicting priests for their lust for power and wealth and the Church's opposition to scientific investigation. He presents the history of Christianity as one of corruption and oppression. Paine criticizes the tyrannical actions of the Church as he had those of governments in the Rights of Man and Common Sense, stating that "the Christian theory is little else than the idolatry of the ancient Mythologists, accommodated to the purposes of power and revenue." That kind of attack distinguishes Paine's book from other deistic works, which were less interested in challenging social and political hierarchies. He argues that the Church and the state are a single corrupt institution that does not act in the best interests of the people and so both must be radically altered:

Soon after I had published the pamphlet "Common Sense," in America, I saw the exceeding probability that a revolution in the system of government would be followed by a revolution in the system of religion. The adulterous connection of Church and State, wherever it has taken place ... has so effectually prohibited by pains and penalties every discussion upon established creeds, and upon first principles of religion, that until the system of government should be changed, those subjects could not be brought fairly and openly before the world; but that whenever this should be done, a revolution in the system of religion would follow. Human inventions and priestcraft would be detected; and man would return to the pure, unmixed and unadulterated belief of one God, and no more.

As Jon Mee, a scholar of British radicalism, writes: "Paine believed ... a revolution in religion was the natural corollary, even prerequisite, of a fully successful political revolution." Paine lays out a vision of, in Davidson and Scheick's words, "an age of intellectual freedom, when reason would triumph over superstition, when the natural liberties of humanity would supplant priestcraft and kingship, which were both secondary effects of politically managed foolish legends and religious superstitions." It is this vision that scholars have called Paine's "secular millennialism" and it appears in all of his works. He ends the Rights of Man, for example, with the statement: "From what we now see, nothing of reform in the political world ought to be held improbable. It is an age of revolutions, in which everything may be looked for." Paine "transformed the millennial Protestant vision of the rule of Christ on earth into a secular image of utopia," emphasizing the possibilities of "progress" and "human perfectibility" that could be achieved by humankind, without God's aid.

=== Intellectual debts ===
Although Paine liked to say that he read very little, his writings belied that statement; The Age of Reason has intellectual roots in the traditions of David Hume, Spinoza, and Voltaire. Since Hume had already made many of the same "moral attacks upon Christianity" that Paine popularized in The Age of Reason, scholars have concluded that Paine probably read Hume's works on religion or had at least heard about them through the Joseph Johnson circle. Paine would have been particularly drawn to Hume's description of religion as "a positive source of harm to society" that "led men to be factious, ambitious and intolerant." More of an influence on Paine than Hume was Spinoza's Tractatus Theologico-politicus (1678). Paine would have been exposed to Spinoza's ideas through the works of other 18th-century deists, most notably Conyers Middleton.

Though these larger philosophical traditions are clear influences on The Age of Reason, Paine owes the greatest intellectual debt to the English deists of the early 18th century, such as Peter Annet. John Toland had argued for the use of reason in interpreting scripture, Matthew Tindal had argued against revelation, Middleton had described the Bible as mythology and questioned the existence of miracles, Thomas Morgan had disputed the claims of the Old Testament, Thomas Woolston had questioned the believability of miracles and Thomas Chubb had maintained that Christianity lacked morality. All of those arguments appear in The Age of Reason albeit less coherently.

== Rhetoric and style ==
The most distinctive feature of The Age of Reason, like all of Paine's works, is its linguistic style. Historian Eric Foner argues that Paine's works "forged a new political language" designed to bring politics to the people by using a "clear, simple and straightforward" style. Paine outlined "a new vision—a utopian image of an egalitarian republican society" and his language reflected these ideals. He originated such phrases as "the rights of man," "the age of reason," "the age of revolution," and "the times that try men's souls." Foner also maintains that with The Age of Reason Paine "gave deism a new, aggressive, explicitly anti-Christian tone".

He did so by employing "vulgar" (that is, "low" or "popular") language, an irreverent tone, and even religious rhetoric. In a letter to Elihu Palmer, one of his most loyal followers in America, Paine describes part of his rhetorical philosophy:

The hinting and intimidating manner of writing that was formerly used on subjects of this kind [religion], produced skepticism, but not conviction. It is necessary to be bold. Some people can be reasoned into sense, and others must be shocked into it. Say a bold thing that will stagger them, and they will begin to think.

Paine's rhetoric had broad appeal; his "pithy" lines were "able to bridge working-class and middle-class cultures" and become common quotations.

Part of what makes Paine's style so memorable is his effective use of repetition and rhetorical questions in addition to the profusion of "anecdote, irony, parody, satire, feigned confusion, folk matter, concrete vocabulary, and .. appeals to common sense". Paine's conversational style draws the reader into the text. His use of "we" conveys an "illusion that he and the readers share the activity of constructing an argument." By thus emphasizing the presence of the reader and leaving images and arguments half-formed, Paine encourages his readers to complete them independently.

=== "Vulgar" language ===
The most distinctive element of Paine's style in The Age of Reason is its "vulgarity". In the 18th century, "vulgarity" was associated with the middling and lower classes and not with obscenity and so when Paine celebrates his "vulgar" style and his critics attack it, the dispute is over class accessibility, not profanity. For example, Paine describes the Fall this way:

The Christian Mythologists, after having confined Satan in a pit, were obliged to let him out again to bring on the sequel of the fable. He is then introduced into the Garden of Eden, in the shape of a snake or a serpent, and in that shape he enters into familiar conversation with Eve, who is no way surprised to hear a snake talk; and the issue of this tête-à-tête is that he persuades her to eat an apple, and the eating of that apple damns all mankind. After giving Satan this triumph over the whole creation, one would have supposed that the Church Mythologists would have been kind enough to send him back again to the pit: or, if they had not done this, that they would have put a mountain upon him (for they say that their faith can remove a mountain), or have put him under a mountain, as the former mythologists had done, to prevent his getting again among the women and doing more mischief. But instead of this they leave him at large, without even obliging him to give his parole—the secret of which is that they could not do without him; and after being at the trouble of making him, they bribed him to stay. They promised him ALL the Jews, ALL the Turks by anticipation, nine-tenths of the world beside, and Mahomet into the bargain. After this, who can doubt the bountifulness of the Christian Mythology? Having thus made an insurrection and a battle in heaven, in which none of the combatants could be either killed or wounded—put Satan into the pit—let him out again—gave him a triumph over the whole creation—damned all mankind by the eating of an apple, these Christian Mythologists bring the two ends of their fable together. They represent this virtuous and amiable man, Jesus Christ, to be at once both God and Man, and also the Son of God, celestially begotten, on purpose to be sacrificed, because they say that Eve in her longing had eaten an apple. [emphasis Paine's]

The irreverent tone that Paine used, combined with the vulgar style, set his work apart from its predecessors. It took "deism out of the hands of the aristocracy and intellectuals and [brought] it to the people".

Paine's rhetorical appeal to "the people" attracted almost as much criticism as his ridicule of the Bible. Bishop Richard Watson, forced to address the new audience in his influential response to Paine, An Apology for the Bible, wrote: "I shall, designedly, write this and the following letters in a popular manner; hoping that thereby they may stand a chance of being perused by that class of readers, for whom your work seems to be particularly calculated, and who are the most likely to be injured by it." However, it was not only the style that concerned Watson and others but also the cheapness of Paine's book. At one sedition trial in the early 1790s, the Attorney–General tried to prohibit Thomas Cooper from publishing his response to Burke's Reflections on the Revolution in France and argued that "although there was no exception to be taken to his pamphlet when in the hands of the upper classes, yet the government would not allow it to appear at a price which would insure its circulation among the people."

=== Irreverent tone ===
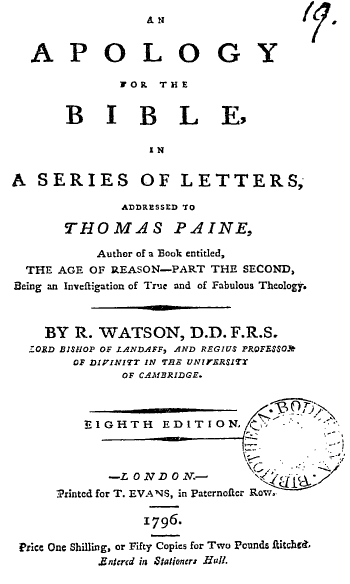
Title page from the eighth edition of Bishop Watson's rejoinder to Paine

Paine's style is not only "vulgar" but also irreverent. For example, he wrote that once one dismisses the false idea of Moses being the author of Genesis, "The story of Eve and the serpent, and of Noah and his ark, drops to a level with the Arabian tales, without the merit of being entertaining." Although many early English deists had relied on ridicule to attack the Bible and Christianity, theirs was a refined wit rather than the broad humor that Paine employed. It was the early Deists of the middling ranks, not the educated elite, who initiated the kind of ridicule Paine would make famous.

It was Paine's "ridiculing" tone that most angered Churchmen. As John Redwood, a scholar of deism, puts it: "the age of reason could perhaps more eloquently and adequately be called the age of ridicule, for it was ridicule, not reason, that endangered the Church." Significantly, Watson's Apology directly chastises Paine for his mocking tone:

I am unwilling to attribute bad designs, deliberate wickedness, to you or to any man; I cannot avoid believing, that you think you have truth on your side, and that you are doing service to mankind in endeavouring to root out what you esteem superstition. What I blame you for is this—that you have attempted to lessen the authority of the Bible by ridicule, more than by reason.

=== Religious influences ===
Paine's Quaker upbringing predisposed him to deistic thinking at the same time that it positioned him firmly within the tradition of religious Dissent. Paine acknowledged that he was indebted to his Quaker background for his skepticism, but the Quakers' esteem for plain speaking, a value expressed both explicitly and implicitly in The Age of Reason, influenced his writing even more. As the historian E. P. Thompson has put it, Paine "ridiculed the authority of the Bible with arguments which the collier or country girl could understand." His description of the story of the virgin birth of Jesus demystifies biblical language and is "an account of a young woman engaged to be married, and while under this engagement she is, to speak plain language, debauched by a ghost." Quaker conversion narratives also influenced the style of The Age of Reason. Davidson and Scheick argue that its "introductory statement of purpose, a fervid sense of inward inspiration, a declared expression of conscience, and an evangelical intention to instruct others" resemble the personal confessions of American Quakers.

Paine takes advantage of several religious rhetorics beyond those associated with Quakerism in The Age of Reason, most importantly by millennial language that appealed to his lower-class readers. Claiming that true religious language is universal, Paine uses elements of the Christian rhetorical tradition to undermine the hierarchies perpetuated by religion itself. The sermonic quality of Paine's writing is one of its most recognizable traits. Sacvan Bercovitch, a scholar of the sermon, argues that Paine's writing often resembles that of the jeremiad or "political sermon." He contends that Paine draws on the Puritan tradition in which "theology was wedded to politics and politics to the progress of the kingdom of God". One reason that Paine may have been drawn to this style is because he may have briefly been a Methodist preacher, but that suspicion cannot be verified.

== Reception and legacy ==
The Age of Reason provoked a hostile reaction from most readers and critics, although the intensity of that hostility varied by locality. There were four major factors for this animosity: Paine denied that the Bible was a sacred, inspired text; he argued that Christianity was a human invention; his ability to command a large readership frightened those in power; and his irreverent and satirical style of writing about Christianity and the Bible offended many believers.

=== Britain ===
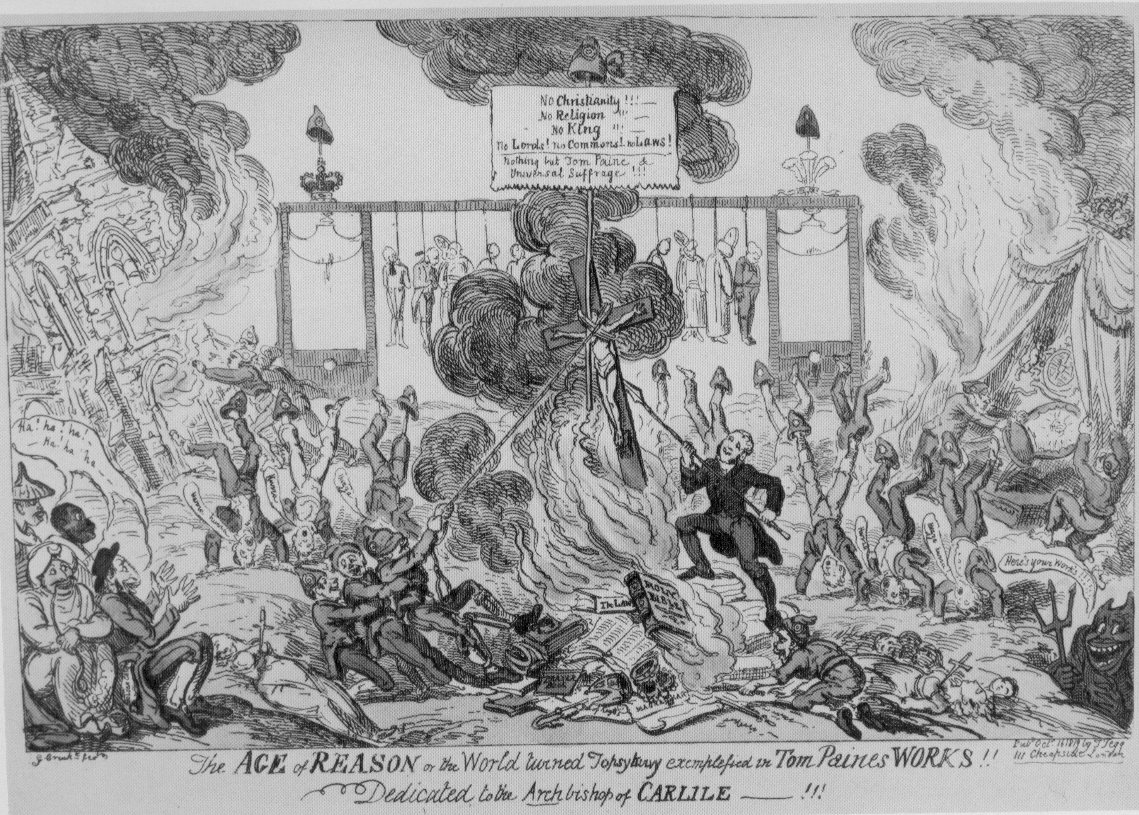
A George Cruikshank cartoon attacking Paine; The caption reads: "The Age of Reason; or, the World turned Topsy-turvy exemplified in Tom Paine's Works!"

Paine's Age of Reason sparked enough anger in Britain to initiate not only a series of government prosecutions but also a pamphlet war. Around 50 unfavorable replies appeared between 1795 and 1799 alone, and refutations were still being published in 1812. Many of them responded specifically to Paine's attack on the Bible in Part II (when Thomas Williams was prosecuted for printing Part II, it became clear its circulation had far exceeded that of Part I). Although critics responded to Paine's analysis of the Bible, they did not usually address his specific arguments. Instead, they advocated a literal reading of the Bible, citing the Bible's long history as evidence of its authority. They also issued ad hominem attacks against Paine, describing him "as an enemy of proper thought and of the morality of decent, enlightened people". Dissenters such as Joseph Priestley, who had endorsed the arguments of the Rights of Man, turned away from those presented in The Age of Reason. Even the liberal Analytical Review was skeptical of Paine's claims and distanced itself from the book. Paine's deism was simply too radical for these more moderate reformers and they feared being tarred with the brush of extremism.

Despite the outpouring of antagonistic replies to The Age of Reason, some scholars have argued that Constantin Volney's deistic The Ruins (translations of excerpts from the French original appeared in radical papers such as Thomas Spence's Pig's Meat and Daniel Isaac Eaton's Politics for the People) was actually more influential than The Age of Reason. According to David Bindman, The Ruins "achieved a popularity in England comparable to Rights of Man itself." One minister complained that "the mischief arising from the spreading of such a pernicious publication [as The Age of Reason] was infinitely greater than any that could spring from limited suffrage and septennial parliaments" (other popular reform causes).

It was not until Richard Carlile's 1818 trial for publishing The Age of Reason that Paine's text became "the anti-Bible of all lower-class nineteenth-century infidel agitators". Although the book had been selling well before the trial, once Carlile was arrested and charged, 4,000 copies were sold in just a few months. At the trial itself, which created a media frenzy, Carlile read the entirety of The Age of Reason into the court record, ensuring it an even wider publication. Between 1818 and 1822, Carlile claimed to have "sent into circulation near 20,000 copies of the Age of Reason". Just as in the 1790s, it was the language that most angered the authorities in 1818. As Joss Marsh, in her study of blasphemy in the 19th century, pointed out, "at these trials plain English was reconfigured as itself 'abusive' and 'outrageous.' The Age of Reason struggle almost tolled the hour when the words 'plain,' 'coarse,' 'common,' and 'vulgar' took on a pejorative meaning." Carlile was convicted of blasphemy and sentenced to one year in prison but spent six years instead because he refused any "legal conditions" on his release.

Paine's new rhetoric came to dominate popular 19th-century radical journalism, particularly that of freethinkers, Chartists and Owenites. Its legacy can be seen in Thomas Jonathan Wooler's radical periodical The Black Dwarf, Carlile's numerous newspapers and journals, the radical works of William Cobbett, Henry Hetherington's periodicals the Penny Papers and the Poor Man's Guardian, Chartist William Lovett's works, George Holyoake"s newspapers and books on Owenism, and freethinker Charles Bradlaugh's New Reformer. A century after the publication of The Age of Reason, Paine's rhetoric was still being used: George William Foote's "Bible Handbook (1888) ... systematically manhandles chapters and verses to bring out 'Contradictions,' 'Absurdities,' 'Atrocities,' and 'Obscenities,' exactly in the manner of Paine's Age of Reason." The periodical The Freethinker (founded in 1881 by George Foote) argued, like Paine, that the "absurdities of faith" could be "slain with laughter."

=== France ===
The Age of Reason, despite having been written for the French, made very little, if any, impact on revolutionary France. Paine wrote that "the people of France were running headlong into atheism and I had the work translated into their own language, to stop them in that career, and fix them to the first article ... of every man's creed who has any creed at all – I believe in God" (emphasis Paine's). Paine's arguments were already common and accessible in France; they had, in a sense, already been rejected.

While still in France, Paine formed the Church of Theophilanthropy with five other families, a civil religion that held as its central dogma that man should worship God's wisdom and benevolence and imitate those divine attributes as much as possible. The church had no priest or minister, and the traditional Biblical sermon was replaced by scientific lectures or homilies on the teachings of philosophers. It celebrated four festivals honoring St. Vincent de Paul, George Washington, Socrates, and Rousseau. Samuel Adams articulated the goals of this church when he wrote that Paine aimed "to renovate the age by inculcating in the minds of youth the fear and love of the Deity and universal philanthropy." The church closed in 1801, when Napoleon concluded a concordat with the Vatican.

=== United States ===
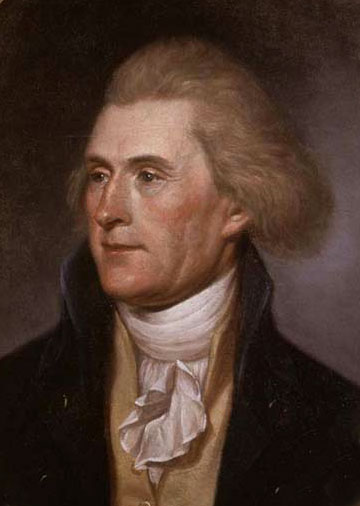
Thomas Jefferson, often identified as an American deist

In the United States, The Age of Reason initially caused a deistic "revival". Paine became so reviled that he could still be maligned as a "filthy little atheist" by Theodore Roosevelt over one hundred years later.

At the end of the 18th century, America was ripe for Paine's arguments. Ethan Allen published the first American defense of deism, Reason, The Only Oracle of Man (1784), but deism remained primarily a philosophy of the educated elite. Men such as Benjamin Franklin and Thomas Jefferson espoused its tenets but at the same time argued that religion served the useful purpose of "social control." It was not until the publication of Paine's more entertaining and popular work that deism reached into the middling and lower classes in America. The public was receptive, in part, because they approved of the secular ideals of the French Revolution. The Age of Reason went through 17 editions and sold thousands of copies in the United States. Elihu Palmer, "a blind renegade minister" and Paine's most loyal follower in America, promoted deism throughout the country. Palmer published what became "the bible of American deism", The Principles of Nature, established deistic societies from Maine to Georgia, built Temples of Reason throughout the nation, and founded two deistic newspapers for which Paine eventually wrote seventeen essays. Foner wrote, "The Age of Reason became the most popular deist work ever written ... Before Paine it had been possible to be both a Christian and a deist; now such a religious outlook became virtually untenable." Paine presented deism to the masses, and, as in Britain, educated elites feared the consequences of such material in the hands of so many. Their fear helped to drive the backlash which soon followed.

Almost immediately after this deistic upsurge, the Second Great Awakening began. George Spater explains that "the revulsion felt for Paine's Age of Reason and for other anti-religious thought was so great that a major counter-revolution had been set underway in America before the end of the eighteenth century." By 1796, every student at Harvard was given a copy of Watson's rebuttal of The Age of Reason. In 1815, Parson Weems, an early American novelist and moralist, published God's Revenge Against Adultery, in which one of the major characters "owed his early downfall to reading 'PAINE'S AGE OF REASON'". Paine's "libertine" text leads the young man to "bold slanders of the bible" even to the point that he "threw aside his father's good old family bible, and for a surer guide to pleasure took up the AGE OF REASON!"

Paine could not publish Part III of The Age of Reason in America until 1807 because of the deep antipathy against him. Hailed only a few years earlier as a hero of the American Revolution, Paine was now lambasted in the press and called "the scavenger of faction," a "lilly-livered sinical [sic] rogue," a "loathsome reptile," a "demi-human archbeast," "an object of disgust, of abhorrence, of absolute loathing to every decent man except the President of the United States [Thomas Jefferson]." In October 1805 John Adams wrote to his friend Benjamin Waterhouse, an American physician and scientist:

I am willing you should call this the Age of Frivolity as you do, and would not object if you had named it the Age of Folly, Vice, Frenzy, Brutality, Daemons, Buonaparte [sic], Tom Paine, or the Age of the Burning Brand from Bottomless Pit, or anything but the Age of Reason. I know not whether any man in the world has had more influence on its inhabitants or affairs for the last thirty years than Tom Paine. There can be no severer satyr [sic] on the age. For such a mongrel between pig and puppy, begotten by a wild boar on a bitch wolf, never before in any age of the world was suffered by the poltroonery of mankind, to run through such a career of mischief. Call it then the Age of Paine.

Adams viewed Paine's Age of Reason not as the embodiment of the Enlightenment but as a "betrayal" of it. Despite all of these attacks, Paine never wavered in his beliefs; when he was dying, a woman came to visit him, claiming that God had instructed her to save his soul. Paine dismissed her in the same tones that he had used in The Age of Reason: "pooh, pooh, it is not true. You were not sent with any such impertinent message ... Pshaw, He would not send such a foolish ugly old woman as you about with His message."

The Age of Reason was largely ignored after 1820, except by radical groups in Britain and freethinkers in America, such as Robert G. Ingersoll and the American abolitionist Moncure Daniel Conway, who edited his works and wrote the first biography of Paine, favorably reviewed by The New York Times. Not until the publication of Charles Darwin's The Origin of Species in 1859, and the large-scale abandonment of the literal reading of the Bible that it caused in Britain did many of Paine's ideas take hold. As writer Mark Twain said, "It took a brave man before the Civil War to confess he had read the Age of Reason ... I read it first when I was a cub pilot, read it with fear and hesitation, but marveling at its fearlessness and wonderful power." Paine's criticisms of the church, the monarchy, and the aristocracy appear most clearly in Twain's A Connecticut Yankee in King Arthur's Court (1889).

Paine's text is still published today, one of the few 18th-century religious texts to be widely available. Its message still resonates, evidenced by Christopher Hitchens, who stated that "if the rights of man are to be upheld in a dark time, we shall require an age of reason". His 2006 book on the Rights of Man ends with the claim that "in a time ... when both rights and reason are under several kinds of open and covert attack, the life and writing of Thomas Paine will always be part of the arsenal on which we shall need to depend."

== See also ==
- The American Crisis
- Common Sense
- Rights of Man, also written by Thomas Paine
- American philosophy

== Bibliography ==
- Bindman, David. "'My own mind is my own church': Blake, Paine and the French Revolution." Reflections of Revolution: Images of Romanticism. Ed. Alison Yarrington and Kelvin Everest. London: Routledge, 1993. ISBN 0-415-07741-9.
- Claeys, Gregory (1989). Thomas Paine: Social and Political Thought. Unwin Hyman. ISBN 978-0-04-445090-0.
- Clark, Harry Hayden (1933). "Thomas Paine's Theories of Rhetoric". Transactions of the Wisconsin Academy of Sciences, Arts, and Letters. 28: 307–39.
- Davidson, Edward H.; Scheick, William J. (1994). Paine, Scripture, and Authority: The Age of Reason as Religious and Political Idea. Lehigh University Press. ISBN 978-0-934223-29-4.
- Dyck, Ian, ed. Citizen of the World: Essays on Thomas Paine. New York: St. Martin's Press, 1988. ISBN 0-312-01300-0.
- Foner, Eric. Tom Paine and Revolutionary America. London: Oxford University Press, 1976. ISBN 0-19-502182-7.
- Fruchtman, Jr., Jack. Thomas Paine and the Religion of Nature. Baltimore: Johns Hopkins University Press, 1993. ISBN 0-8018-4571-8.
- Gimbel, Richard (1957). "The First Appearance of Thomas Paine's The Age of Reason". Yale University Library Gazette. 31 (2): 87–89. JSTOR 40857734.
- Harrison, J. F. C. "Thomas Paine and Millenarian Radicalism." Citizen of the World: Essays on Thomas Paine. Ed. Ian Dyck. New York: St. Martin's Press, 1988. ISBN 0-312-01300-0.
- Hawke, David Freeman. Paine. New York: Harper & Row, 1974. ISBN 0-06-011784-2.
- Herrick, James A. The Radical Rhetoric of the English Deists: The Discourse of Skepticism, 1680–1750. Columbia: University of South Carolina Press, 1997. ISBN 1-57003-166-5.
- Hole, Robert. Pulpits, politics and public order in England, 1760–1832. Cambridge: Cambridge University Press, 1989. ISBN 0-521-36486-8.
- Kuklick, Bruce. "Introduction". Paine: Political Writings. Rev. ed. Cambridge: Cambridge University Press, 1997. ISBN 0-521-66799-2.
- Marsh, Joss. Word Crimes: Blasphemy, Culture, and Literature in Nineteenth-Century England. Chicago: University of Chicago Press, 1998. ISBN 0-226-50691-6.
- Mee, Jon. Dangerous Enthusiasms: William Blake and the Culture of Radicalism in the 1790s. Oxford: Clarendon Press, 1992. ISBN 0-19-812226-8.
- Redwood, John. Reason, Ridicule and Religion: The Age of Enlightenment in England, 1660–1750. London: Thames and Hudson, 1976. ISBN 0-674-74953-7.
- Robbins, Caroline (1983). "The Lifelong Education of Thomas Paine (1737-1809): Some Reflections upon His Acquaintance among Books". Proceedings of the American Philosophical Society. 127 (3): 135–142. JSTOR 986383.
- Royle, Edward, ed. The Infidel Tradition from Paine to Bradlaugh. London: Macmillan Press Ld., 1976. ISBN 0-333-17434-8.
- Samuels, Shirley (1987). "Infidelity and Contagion: The Rhetoric of Revolution". Early American Literature. 22 (2): 183–91. JSTOR 25056662.
- Smith, Olivia. The Politics of Language, 1791–1819. Oxford: Clarendon Press, 1984. ISBN 0-19-812817-7.
- Smylie, James H. (1972). "Clerical Perspectives on Deism: Paine's The Age of Reason in Virginia". Eighteenth-Century Studies. 6 (2): 203–220. doi:10.2307/3031673. JSTOR 3031673.
- Spater, George. "Introduction." Citizen of the World: Essays on Thomas Paine. Ed. Ian Dyck. New York: St. Martin's Press, 1988. ISBN 0-312-01300-0.
- Thompson, E. P. The Making of the English Working Class. New York: Vintage Books, 1966. ISBN 0-394-70322-7.
- Walters, Kerry S. Rational Infidels: The American Deists. Durango, CO: Longwood Academic, 1992. ISBN 0-89341-641-X.
- Watson, Richard. An Apology for the Bible, in a Series of Letters, addressed to Thomas Paine. Philadelphia: James Carey, 1979.
- Wiener, Joel H. "Collaborators of a Sort: Thomas Paine and Richard Carlile." Citizen of the World: Essays on Thomas Paine. Ed. Ian Dyck. New York: St. Martin's Press, 1988. ISBN 0-312-01300-0.
- Wilson, David A. Paine and Cobbett: The Transatlantic Connection. Kingston and Montreal: McGill-Queen's University Press, 1988. ISBN 0-7735-1013-3.
- Woll, Walter. Thomas Paine: Motives for Rebellion. Frankfurt am Main: Peter Lang, 1992. ISBN 3-631-44800-7.

== Modern reprints of The Age of Reason ==
- Paine, Thomas. The Age of Reason. Ed. Kerry Walters. Peterborough: Broadview Press, 2011. ISBN 978-1-55481-045-1.
- Paine, Thomas. The Age of Reason, The Complete Edition World Union of Deists, 2009. ISBN 978-0-939040-35-3
- Paine, Thomas. The Age of Reason. Ed. Philip Sheldon Foner. New York: Citadel Press, 1974. ISBN 0-8065-0549-4.
- Paine, Thomas. Thomas Paine: Collected Writings. Ed. Eric Foner. Library of America, 1995. ISBN 1-883011-03-5.
- Paine, Thomas. The Life and Major Writings of Thomas Paine. Ed. Philip S. Foner. Replica Books, 2000. ISBN 0-7351-0077-2.
- Paine, Thomas. The Thomas Paine Reader. Eds. Michael Foot and Isaac Kramnick. New York: Penguin Books, 1987. ISBN 0-14-044496-3.
