= Principles of Nature =

1801 book by Elihu Palmer

Principles of Nature, also known as The Principles of Nature, or A Development of the Moral Causes of Happiness and Misery among the Human Species, was a work written in 1801 by Elihu Palmer. The work was similar to Thomas Paine's writings, and focused on "God, Deism, "revealed" religions, etc." It has been considered the Bible of American deism. Although Palmer first published in America, after his death, in 1819, Principles of Nature was published in England. Richard Carlile was fined and jailed for several years for publishing Palmer's work in Britain (among other works deemed blasphemous, including those by Thomas Paine) .
