= Daniel Isaac Eaton =

English radical author, publisher and activist

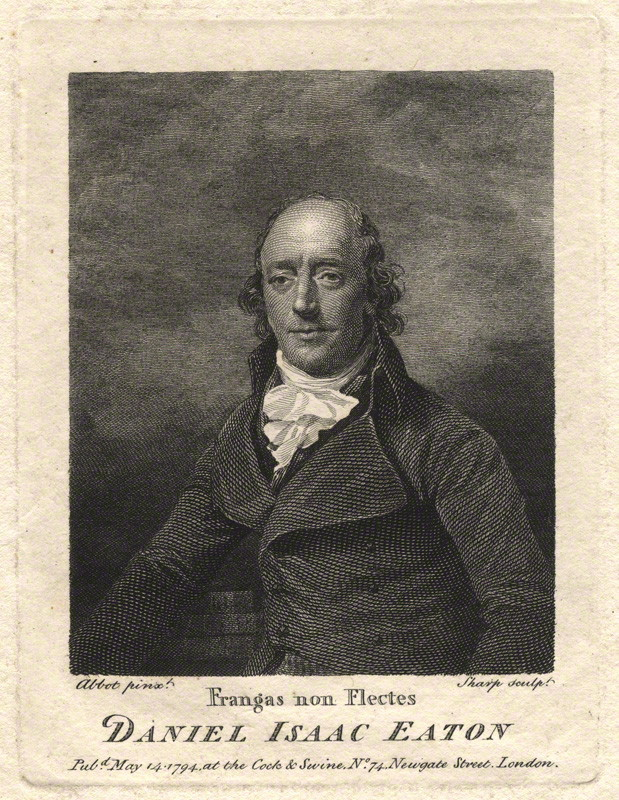
Daniel Isaac Eaton by William Sharp, after Lemuel Francis Abbott.

Daniel Isaac Eaton (1753–1814) was an English radical writer, publisher and activist. He was tried eight times for selling radical literature and convicted in 1812 for selling The Age of Reason.

Eaton was the publisher of the popular periodical Politics for the People, and was arrested on 7 December 1793 for publishing a statement by John Thelwall, a radical lecturer and debater: Thelwall had made a speech that included an anecdote about a tyrannical gamecock named "King Chanticleer". Eaton was imprisoned for three months before his trial in an effort to bankrupt him and his family. In February 1794, he was finally brought to trial and defended by John Gurney: he was acquitted.

Percy Bysshe Shelley wrote the essay "A Letter to Lord Ellenborough" in his defence in 1812.
