= Peter Annet =

Peter Annet (1693 – 18 January 1769) was an English deist and early freethinker.

== Early life and work ==
Annet is said to have been born at Liverpool. A schoolmaster by profession, he became prominent owing to his attacks on orthodox theologians, as well as for his membership of a semi-theological debating society, the Robin Hood Society, which met at the Robin Hood and Little John at Butcher Row. Annet was very hostile to the clergy and to scripture, being a thoroughgoing deist. He distinguished himself by being extremely critical of the character and reputation of King David and the Apostle Paul. In 1739 he wrote and published a pamphlet, Judging for Ourselves, or Freethinking the Great Duty of Religion, a strong criticism of Christianity. For writing this and similar pamphlets, he lost his teaching position.

A work attributed to him, called A History of the Man after God's own Heart (1761), intended to show that King George II was insulted by a current comparison with King David. The book is said to have inspired Voltaire's Saul. It is also attributed to one John Noorthouck (Noorthook).

In 1763 he was condemned for blasphemous libel in his paper called the Free Inquirer, of which only nine numbers were published. After his release he kept a small school in Lambeth, one of his pupils being the politician James Stephen (1758–1832), who became master in Chancery.

== Pillory and death ==
At age 68, Annet was sentenced to the pillory and a year's hard labour. He died on 18 January 1769.

== Position ==
When the Christian apologists replaced the argument from miracles with the argument from personal witness and the credibility of Biblical evidence, Annet, in his Resurrection of Jesus (1744), assailed the validity of such evidence, and first advanced the hypothesis of the illusory death of Jesus, suggesting also that possibly Paul should be regarded as the founder of a new religion. In Supernaturals Examined (1747) Annet roundly denies the possibility of miracles.

Annet stands between the earlier philosophic deists and the later propagandists of Thomas Paine's school, and seems to have been the first freethought lecturer (J. M. Robertson); his essays, A Collection of the Tracts of a certain Free Enquirer, are forcible but lack refinement. He invented a system of shorthand (2nd ed., with a copy of verses by Joseph Priestley).
