= Sayed Hassan Akhlaq =

Afghan-born American writer and academic (born 1976)

Sayed Hassan Akhlaq سید حسن اخلاق
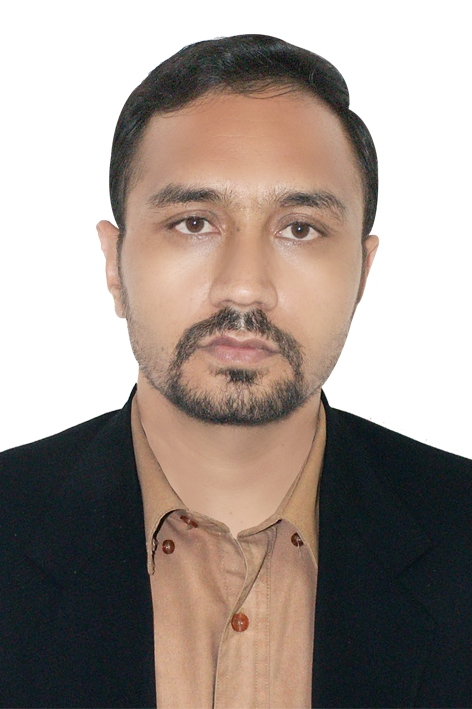
- Akhlaq

Academy of Sciences of Afghanistan

Personal details
- Born: 1 June 1976 (age 50) Sayghan district, Bamyan province, Afghanistan
- Education: Imam Khomeini International University; Allameh Tabatabai University

Sayed Hassan Akhlaq (Persian: سید حسن اخلاق; born 1976) is an Afghan-born American academic and writer.

== Life ==
Akhlaq was born in 1976, in Sayghan City, in the province of Bamyan, Afghanistan. He immigrated to Iran when he was four years old. Finishing primary and secondary schools in Mashhad, he started to study classical religious seminaries (in Qum and Mashhad).

Afterward he studied Islamic traditional courses and was educated in the field of Islamic Theology and Philosophy in Razavi University of Islamic Sciences. In 2022, Dr. Akhlaq gave a talk at Fairfield University where he shared his personal narrative. His presentation covered his time as a refugee, his approaches to nurturing critical thinking and propelling academic freedom in Afghanistan, and his subsequent exile due to his philosophical and political beliefs and teachings.

He obtained his Master of Art degree in the field of Western philosophy from the Imam Khomeini International University and a doctorate (PhD) in Western philosophy from Allameh Tabatabai University.

He has taught at some universities in Iran and Afghanistan, such as Payame Noor University (2008–2010), Al-Mustafa International University (2006–2010), Academy of Sciences of Afghanistan (2010) and Gharjistan Institute of Higher Education (2010). He acted as the adviser of Academy of Sciences of Afghanistan and Chancellor of Gharjistan University (Farah Branch). He works as the adviser for the Center for the Study of Islam and the Middle East in Washington D.C. Akhlaq, is affiliated with the George Washington University, the Catholic University of America, Princeton University University Center for Human Values, and Boston University's Department World Languages & Literatures. He has given lectures at University of Idaho. and Purdue University Purdue College of Liberal Arts and University of Louisville College of Arts & Sciences. The Global Studies Directory: People, Organizations, Publications, published by Brill in 2018, included Akhlaq as a prominent figure among scholars significantly contributing to the domain of global studies Akhlaq gave talks on Islamic Science and its Relationship to Faith Islamization and ISIS at the Catholic University's McLean Center for the Study of Culture and Values.

== Activities ==
He has managed the first Afghan intellectuals' magazine, Rayehey-e-azadi:the smell of freedom by international co-editorial staff for more than two years (2002–2003).

He has published five books showing the author's intellectual trend.

His dozens of articles have been published in scholarly and scientific journals (such as: Ayeneh Marefat: Beheshti University, Islam Pizuhi: IHCS, Zehn: Islamic Research Institute for culture and thought, Human Rights: Mofid University, Nebras: Nebras Research Institute in Kabul).

Akhlaq is the first Afghan philosopher that presented papers in The XXII World Congress of Philosophy (2008 Seoul) and Catholic University of America (Washington DC: 2009). He has also published many papers on several profound websites like OpenDemocracy and HuffingtonPost.

Akhlaq is a professional member of American Academy of Religion, American Association of University Professors and American Philosophical Association and American Council for the Study of Islamic Societies in Villanova University. Akhlaq "has made," Global Studies Directory: People, Organizations, Publications writes "significant contributions to dialogue among civilizations with regard to comparative philosophy, modernization, and global studies."

== Published work ==
=== Books ===
- The Secular and The Sacred Complementary and/or Conflictual? (Washington DC.: The Council for Research in Values and Philosophy: 2017, LCCN 2017007504 (print) LCCN 2016053235 (ebook) ISBN 9781565138209 LC record available at Library of Congress)
- From Rumi to Nietzsche (Qom: Sulok-e Javan: 1386/2007 Solar Hejri, ISBN 964-9958-01-0):LC record available at Az Mawlānā tā Nīchah
- The Philosophical discourse between Islam and the West (Qom: Al-Mustafa International University, 1387/2008, ISBN 978-964-195-005-9) LC record available at LC Catalog)
- The Tradition of Enlightenment in the West and Islam (Tehran: Amir Kabir, 1389/2009, ISBN 978-964-00-1231-4) LC record available at LC Catalog.
- From tradition of Balkh to modernity of Paris (Kabul: Nebras Research Institute, 1389/2010, B745.N49 A44 2011)
- The Philosophical Meditations of Allameh Ghuryani (Kabul: Amiri publication, 1398/2019, B978.9936.652.21.7)
- The Etiquette Guidelines of Critical Thinking: (آداب درست اندیشی /Adaab-i DurustAndishi) (Kabul, Maqsudi publishing company, ISBN 978-1312548534)
- The Making of Shia Ayatollahs (Rowman & Littlefield, 2023, ISBN 978-1-7936-5515-8)
- Intellectual and Spiritual Debates in Islam – A Comprehensive Guide to Islamic Discourse’s Intellectual Origins (Cluj University Press, 2023, 2023, ISBN 978-606-37-1890-8)
- Exiled Scholars in Western Academia: Refugees or Intellectuals?: Reflections on the Paradox of Inclusion and Exclusion (Palgrave Macmillan Cham, 2025, ISBN 978-3-031-83774-6)
