= Elihu Palmer =

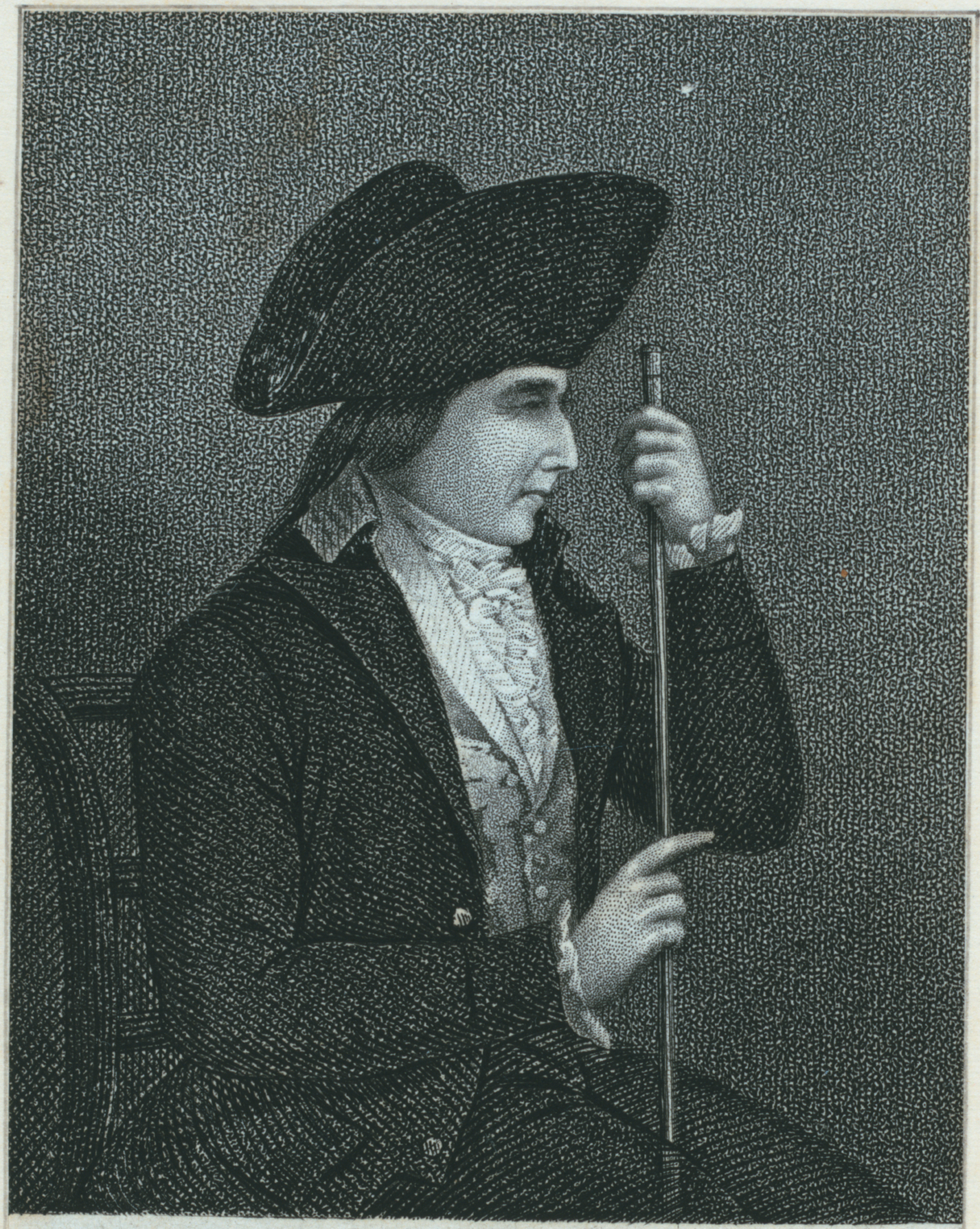
- Elihu Palmer
- Born: 1764; Canterbury, Connecticut
- Died: April 7, 1806 (aged 41–42)
- Education: Dartmouth College
- Occupation: Author
- Writing career
- Notable work: The Principles of Nature, or A Development of the Moral Causes of Happiness and Misery among the Human Species
- Movement: Deism

Elihu Palmer (1764 – April 7, 1806) was an author and advocate of deism in the early days of the United States.

== Life ==
Elihu Palmer was born in Canterbury, Connecticut in 1764. He studied to be a Presbyterian minister at Dartmouth College, where he graduated in 1787. Soon after his graduation, however, he became a deist. After rejecting the Calvinist doctrine of Presbyterianism, Palmer became a physical, spiritual, and intellectual wanderer, ultimately making his way to New York City, where he formed the Deistical Society of New York in 1796.

He resided for a time in Augusta, Georgia, where he collected materials for Jedediah Morse's Geography, and subsequently lived in Philadelphia and New York City. In 1793 he became totally blind from an attack of yellow fever but continued as a public speaker.

Palmer kept writing until the end of his life and published a number of different written works including "A Fourth of July Oration" (1797), and was also the author of The Principles of Nature, or A Development of the Moral Causes of Happiness and Misery among the Human Species. He also founded two newspapers, The Temple of Reason in 1800 and Prospect, or View of the Moral World in 1803.

== Works ==
- Palmer, Elihu (1797). An Enquiry Relative to the Moral & Political Improvement of the Human Species: An Oration, Delivered in the City of New-York on the Fourth of July, Being the Twenty-first Anniversary of American Independence. New York: Printed by John Crookes. OCLC 2493791.
- Palmer, Elihu (1806) [1801]. Principles of Nature, or, A Development of the Moral Causes of Happiness and Misery among the Human Species (3rd ed.). New York: Printed for the author. OCLC 30496642.
  - Critical edition: Walters, Kerry S., ed. (1990). Elihu Palmer's Principles of Nature: Text and Commentary. Wolfeboro, NH: Longwood Academic. ISBN 0893415847. OCLC 20932644.
- Palmer, Elihu, ed. (1803–1805). Prospect: or, View of the Moral World. New York: Printed for the editor. OCLC 2493791.
- Palmer, Elihu (1824). Posthumous Pieces. London: Richard Carlile. doi:10.1037/11700-000. OCLC 19110984.
