= Institute for the Study of Secularism in Society and Culture =

Sociological research institute at Trinity College in Hartford, Connecticut, USA

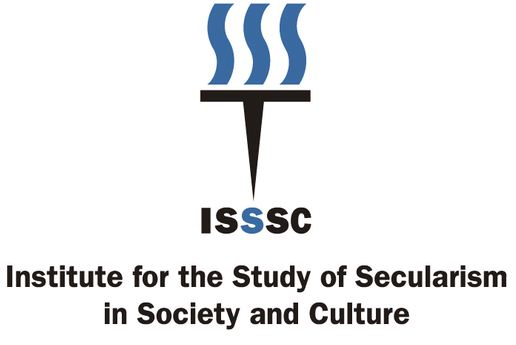
- Abbreviation: ISSSC
- Formation: 2005
- Type: Research institute
- Headquarters: Trinity College, Hartford, CT USA
- Official language: primarily English
- Key people: Barry A. Kosmin (Founding Director); Ariela Keysar (Assoc. Director)
- Website: digitalrepository.trincoll.edu/isssc/

The Institute for the Study of Secularism in Society and Culture (ISSSC) is located at Trinity College in Hartford, Connecticut. ISSSC was established in 2005 to advance the understanding of the role of secular values and the process of secularization in contemporary society and culture. Designed to be multidisciplinary and nonpartisan, the Institute conducts research, lectures and public events.

Author and professor Barry Kosmin is the founding director of the ISSSC.

== Barry Kosmin ==
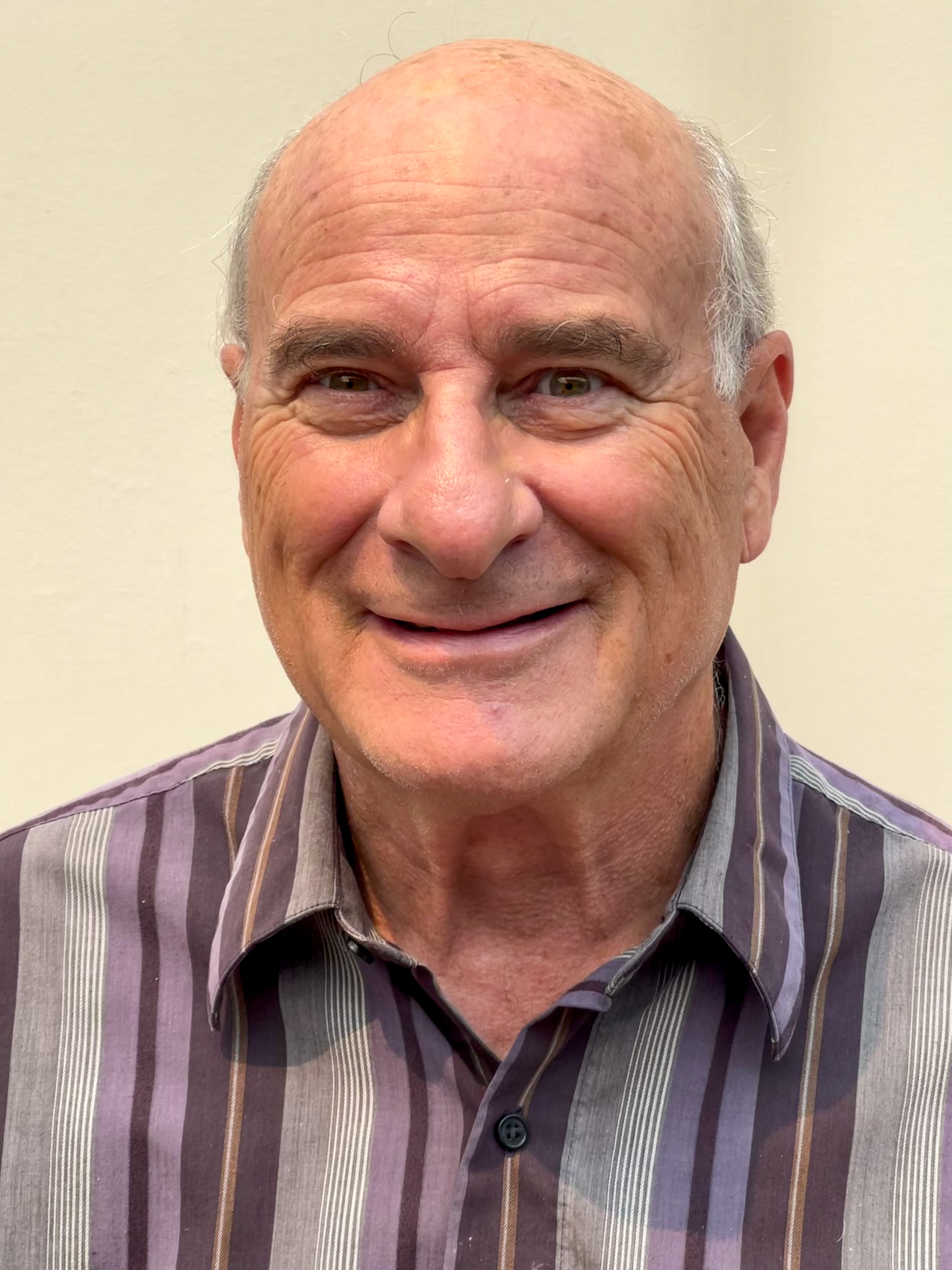
Barry Kosmin 2023

In 2011, Kosmin accepted a seat on the Board of Directors of Center for Inquiry (CFI) where his responsibilities include the Council for Secular Humanism and the Committee for Skeptical Inquiry, as well as serving on the CFI affiliate committee. He is the joint editor of the new academic journal Secularism & Nonreligion and was one of the principal investigators of the 2008 American Religious Identification Survey (ARIS). Kosmin is considered the leading expert "on the growing percentage of Americas who lack a religious identity, the so called "nones". Kosmin has been featured on podcasts such as Center for Inquiry's Point of Inquiry and published in Free Inquiry magazine discussing the results of the ARIS.

The American Humanist Association awarded Kosmin a Lifetime Achievement Award in 2019.

== American Religious Identification Survey (ARIS) ==
Previously named the National Survey of Religious Identification in 1990, it was renamed the American Religious Identification Survey (ARIS) in 2001. The survey was originally created as a social experiment to record the response to the "What is your religion?" question. They found it was necessary to ask a series of questions such as "Do you want to have a religious funeral?" in order to get a better grasp of the answer to the main question.

The 2001 survey intended to replicate the 1990 survey. Data was collected from over 50,000 households over a 4-month period. In 2008 the ARIS again randomly called over 50,000 households and questioned adults about their religious affiliations, if any. ARIS is the survey used by the U.S. Census in the Statistical Abstract of the U.S. to show the religious distribution of the U.S. Population.

The results of the ARIS have been discussed in many news reports by ABC News, The Christian Science Monitor, and USA Today.

== Academics and curriculum development ==
ISSSC develops new multi-disciplinary courses based on a common theme every year with associated faculty at Trinity College, Hartford and the Claremont Colleges, California. The cross-discipline themes include (by year):

- 2005-06: The Roots of the Secular Tradition in the West
- 2006-07: The Secular Tradition and Foundations of the Natural Sciences
- 2007-08: Secularism and the Enlightenment
- 2008-09: The Global Impact of Secular Values
- 2009-10: The Secular Tradition in General Education

== Social science research ==
International Survey: Worldviews and Opinions of Scientists (India 2008)

== Publications ==
2009

- Secularism, Women & The State: The Mediterranean World in the 21st Century (edited by Barry A. Kosmin and Ariela Keysar)

2008

- Secularism & Science in the 21st Century (edited by Ariela Keysar and Barry Kosmin)
- International Survey: Worldviews and Opinions of Scientists

2007

- Secularism & Secularity: Contemporary International Perspectives (edited by Barry Kosmin and Ariela Keysar)
- "Unbelief and Irreligion, Empirical Study and Neglect of" (by Frank L. Pasquale in The New Encyclopedia of Unbelief; edited by Tom Flynn; Amherst, NY: Prometheus Books)

2006

- Religion in a Free Market: Religious and Non-Religious Americans—Who, What, Why and Where (by Barry Kosmin and Ariela Keysar)
