= Criticism of atheism =

Criticism of the concepts, validity and impact of atheism

Criticism of atheism is criticism of the concepts, validity, or impact of atheism, including associated political and social implications. Criticisms include positions based on the history of science, philosophical and logical criticisms, findings in both the natural and social sciences, theistic apologetic arguments, arguments pertaining to ethics and morality, the effects of atheism on the individual, or the assumptions that underpin atheism.

Scientist Carl Sagan said he knew of no compelling evidence against the existence of God. Theists such as biologist and professor Kenneth R. Miller criticise atheism for being an unscientific position. Analytic philosopher Alvin Plantinga, Professor of Philosophy Emeritus at the University of Notre Dame, argues that a failure of theistic arguments might conceivably be good grounds for agnosticism, but not for atheism; and points to the observation of a fine-tuned universe as more likely to be explained by theism than atheism. Oxford Professor of Mathematics John Lennox holds that atheism is an inferior world view to that of theism and attributes to C. S. Lewis the best formulation of Merton's thesis that science sits more comfortably with theistic notions on the basis that men became scientific in Western Europe in the 16th and 17th century "[b]ecause they expected law in nature, and they expected law in nature because they believed in a lawgiver." In other words, it was belief in God that was the "motor that drove modern science". American physician-scientist Francis Collins also cites Lewis as persuasive in convincing him that theism is the more rational world view than atheism.

Other criticisms focus on perceived effects on morality and social cohesion. The Enlightenment philosopher Voltaire, a deist, saw godlessness as weakening "the sacred bonds of society", writing: "If God did not exist, it would be necessary to invent him". The father of classical liberalism, John Locke, believed that the denial of God's existence would undermine the social order and lead to chaos. Edmund Burke, an 18th-century Irish philosopher and statesman praised by both his conservative and liberal peers for his "comprehensive intellect", saw religion as the basis of civil society and wrote that "man is by his constitution a religious animal; that atheism is against, not only our reason, but our instincts; and that it cannot prevail long". Pope Pius XI wrote that Communist atheism was aimed at "upsetting the social order and at undermining the very foundations of Christian civilization". In the 1990s, Pope John Paul II criticised a spreading "practical atheism" as clouding the "religious and moral sense of the human heart" and leading to societies which struggle to maintain harmony.

Other criticisms are on historical distortion of both religion and atheism by atheist proponents. The advocacy of atheism by some of the more violent exponents of the French Revolution, the subsequent militancy of Marxist–Leninist atheism and prominence of atheism in totalitarian states formed in the 20th century is often cited in critical assessments of the implications of atheism. In his Reflections on the Revolution in France, Burke railed against "atheistical fanaticism". The 1937 papal encyclical Divini Redemptoris denounced the atheism of the Soviet Union under Joseph Stalin, which was later influential in the establishment of state atheism across Eastern Europe and elsewhere, including Mao Zedong's China, Kim's North Korea and Pol Pot's Cambodia. Various poets, novelists and lay theologians, among them philosophers G. K. Chesterton and C. S. Lewis, have also criticised atheism. For example, a quote often attributed to Chesterton holds that "[h]e who does not believe in God will believe in anything".

== Definitions and concepts ==
Atheism is the absence of belief that any gods exist, the position that there are no gods, the proposition that God does not exist, or the rejection of belief in the existence of gods.

Deism is a form of theism in which God created the universe and established rationally comprehensible moral and natural laws but does not intervene in human affairs through special revelation. Deism is a natural religion where belief in God is based on application of reason and evidence observed in the designs and laws found in nature. Christian deism refers to a deist who believes in the moral teachings but not the divinity of Jesus.

== Arguments and critiques of atheism ==
The last 50 years has seen an increase in academic philosophical arguments critical of the positions of atheism arguing that they are philosophically unsound. Some of the more common of these arguments are the presumption of atheism, the logical argument from evil, the evidential argument from evil, the argument from nonbelief and absence of evidence arguments.

=== The Presumption of Atheism ===
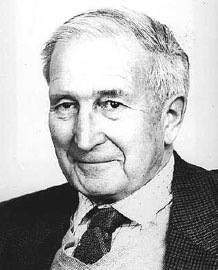
Philosopher Antony Garrard Newton Flew authored The Presumption of Atheism in 1976.

In 1976, atheist philosopher Antony Flew wrote The Presumption of Atheism in which he argued that the question of God's existence should begin by assuming atheism as the default position. According to Flew, the norm for academic philosophy and public dialogue was at that time for atheists and theists to both share their respective "burdens of proof" for their positions. Flew proposed instead that his academic peers redefine "atheism" to bring about these changes:

What I want to examine is the contention that the debate about the existence of God should properly begin from the presumption of atheism, that the onus of proof must lie upon the theist. The word 'atheism', however, has in this contention to be construed unusually. Whereas nowadays the usual meaning of 'atheist' in English is 'someone who asserts that there is no such being as God,' I want the word to be understood not positively but negatively... in this interpretation an atheist becomes: not someone who positively asserts the non-existence of God; but someone who is simply not a theist. The introduction of this new interpretation of the word 'atheism' may appear to be a piece of perverse Humpty-Dumptyism, going arbitrarily against established common usage. 'Whyever', it could be asked, don't you make it not the presumption of atheism but the presumption of agnosticism?

— Excerpts from The Presumption of Atheism, Antony Flew, 1976

Flew's proposition saw little acceptance in the 20th century though in the early 21st century Flew's broader definition of atheism came to be forwarded more commonly. In 2007, analytic philosopher William Lane Craig's described the presumption of atheism as "one of the most commonly proffered justifications of atheism". In 2010, BBC journalist William Crawley explained that Flew's presumption of atheism "made the case, now followed by today's new atheism" arguing that atheism should be the default position. In today's debates, atheists forward the presumption of atheism arguing that atheism is the default position with no burden of proof and assert that the burden of proof for God's existence rests solely on the theist.

The presumption of atheism has been the subject of criticism by atheists, agnostics and theists since Flew advanced his position more than 40 years ago.

==== Criticism of the presumption of atheism ====
The agnostic analytic philosopher Anthony Kenny rejected the presumption of atheism on any definition of atheism arguing that "the true default position is neither theism nor atheism, but agnosticism" adding "a claim to knowledge needs to be substantiated, ignorance need only be confessed".

Many different definitions may be offered of the word 'God'. Given this fact, atheism makes a much stronger claim than theism does. The atheist says that no matter what definition you choose, 'God exists' is always false. The theist only claims that there is some definition which will make 'God exists' true. In my view, neither the stronger nor the weaker claim has been convincingly established.

— Anthony Kenny, What I Believe, p.21

Atheist philosopher Kai Nielsen criticized the presumption of atheism arguing that without an independent concept of rationality or a concept of rationality that atheists and theists can mutually accept, there is no common foundation on which to adjudicate rationality of positions concerning the existence of God. Because the atheist's conceptualization of "rational" differs from the theist, Nielsen argues, both positions can be rationally justified.

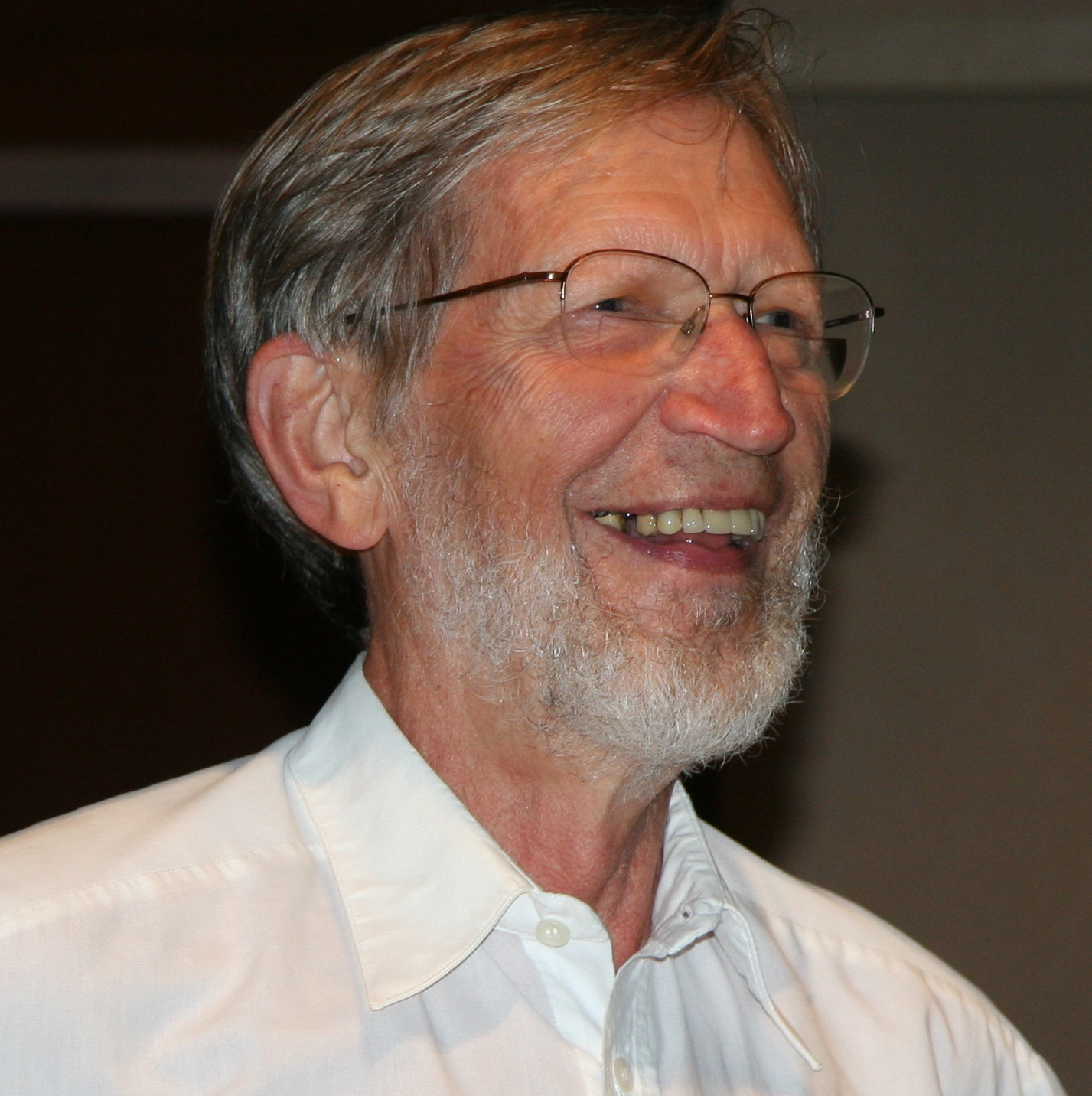
Modal logician philosopher Alvin Plantinga is viewed as an important contributor to Christian philosophy.

Analytic philosopher and modal logician Alvin Plantinga, a theist, rejected the presumption of atheism forwarding a two-part argument. First, he shows that there is no objection to belief in God unless the belief is shown to be false. Second, he argues that belief in God could be rationally warranted if it is a properly basic or foundational belief through an innate human "sense of the divine". Plantinga argues that if we have the innate knowledge of God which he theorizes as a possibility, we could trust belief in God the same way we trust our cognitive faculties in other similar matters, such as our rational belief that there are other minds beyond our own, something we believe, but for which there can be no evidence. Alvin Plantinga's argument puts theistic belief on equal evidential footing with atheism even if Flew's definition of atheism is accepted.

University of Notre Dame philosopher Ralph McInerny goes further than Plantinga, arguing that belief in God reasonably follows from our observations of the natural order and the law-like character of natural events. McInerny argues that the extent of this natural order is so pervasive as to be almost innate, providing a prima facie argument against atheism. McInerny's position goes further than Plantinga's, arguing that theism is evidenced and that the burden of proof rests on the atheist, not on the theist.

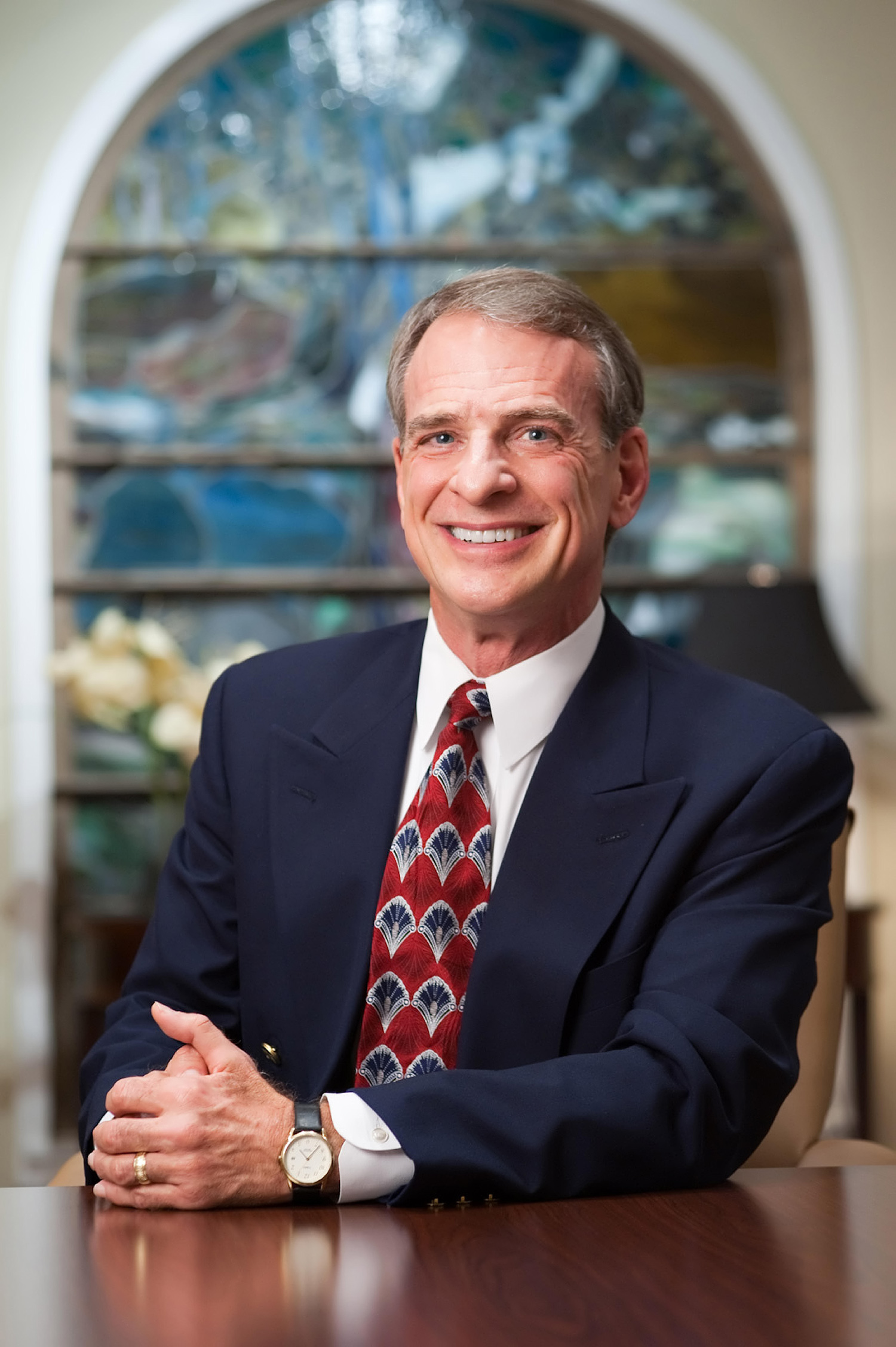
Theoretical philosopher William Lane Craig is a well-known critic of atheist philosophies.

William Lane Craig wrote that if Flew's broader definition of atheism is seen as "merely the absence of belief in God", atheism "ceases to be a view" and "even infants count as atheists". For atheism to be a view, Craig adds: "One would still require justification in order to know either that God exists or that He does not exist".

Like the agnostic Anthony Kenny, Craig argues that there is no presumption for atheism because it is distinct from agnosticism:

[S]uch an alleged presumption is clearly mistaken. For the assertion that "There is no God" is just as much a claim to knowledge as is the assertion that "There is a God." Therefore, the former assertion requires justification just as the latter does. It is the agnostic who makes no knowledge claim at all with respect to God's existence.

— Excerpt by Definition of Atheism, William Lane Craig, 2007

Forty years after Flew published The Presumption of Atheism, his proposition remains controversial.

=== Other arguments and critiques ===
William Lane Craig listed some of the more prominent arguments forwarded by proponents of atheism along with his objections:

- "The Hiddenness of God" is the claim that if God existed, God would have prevented the world's unbelief by making his existence starkly apparent. Craig argues that the problem with this argument is that there is no reason to believe that any more evidence than what is already available would increase the number of people believing in God.
- "The Incoherence of Theism" is the claim that the notion of God is incoherent. Craig argues that a coherent doctrine of God's attributes can be formulated based on scripture like Medieval theologians had done and "Perfect Being Theology"; and that the argument actually helps in refining the concept of God.
- "The Problem of Evil" can be split into two different concerns: the "intellectual" problem of evil concerns how to give a rational explanation of the co-existence of God and evil and the "emotional" problem of evil concerns how to comfort those who are suffering and how to dissolve the emotional dislike people have of a God who would permit such evil. The latter can be dealt with in a diverse manner. Concerning the "intellectual" argument, it is often cast as an incompatibility between statements such as "an omnipotent, omnibenevolent God exists" and "the quantity and kinds of suffering in the world exist". Craig argues that no one has shown that both statements are logically incompatible or improbable with respect to each other. Others use another version of the intellectual argument called the "evidential problem of evil" which claims that the apparently unnecessary or "gratuitous" suffering in the world constitutes evidence against God's existence. Craig argues that it is not clear that the suffering that appears to be gratuitous actually is gratuitous for various reasons, one of which is similar to an objection to utilitarian ethical theory, that it is quite simply impossible for us to estimate which action will ultimately lead to the greatest amount of happiness or pleasure in the world.

T.J. Mawson makes a case against atheism by citing some lines of evidence and reasoning such as the high level of fine-tuning whereby the life of morally sentient and significantly free creatures like humans has implications. On the maximal multiverse hypothesis, he argues that in appealing to infinite universes one is in essence explaining too much and that it even opens up the possibility that certain features of the universe still would require explanation beyond the hypothesis itself. He also argues from induction for fine tuning in that if one supposed that infinite universes existed there should be infinite ways in which observations can be wrong and only one way in which observations can be right at any point in time, for instance, that the color of gems stay the same every time we see them. In other words, if infinite universes existed, then there should be infinite changes to our observations of the universe and in essence be unpredictable in infinite ways, yet this is not what occurs.

Helen De Cruz argues there are two general positions of atheistic arguments: "global" which "denies the existence of any god" and "local" which "denies the existence of a particular concept of God" such as polytheism, pantheism, monotheism, etc. She states that most evidential arguments against theism assume local, not global atheism, and that as such, numerous theistic arguments are not ruled out. She argues that the widespread beliefs in various god configurations and religious experiences provide evidence against global atheism.

Amanda Askell argues that our capacity to be and rationalize prudence along with the acceptance of Pascal's Wager provide prudential objections to atheism.

C. Stephen Evans argues that our normative propensities for our natural persistence to commit to be moral and our ability to generate value in a supposedly absurd world, offer normative objections to atheism. He also argues that it is appropriate for God to make the process whereby one comes to know him, to require moral and spiritual development.

== Atheism, the individual, and society ==
In a global study on atheism, sociologist Phil Zuckerman noted that though there are positive correlations with societal health in many countries where the atheist population is significantly high, countries with higher number of atheists also had the highest suicide rates compared to countries with lower numbers of atheists. He concludes that correlation does not necessarily indicate causation in either case. Another study found similar trends. A 2004 study of religious affiliation and suicide attempts, concluded: "After other factors were controlled, it was found that greater moral objections to suicide and lower aggression level in religiously affiliated subjects may function as protective factors against suicide attempts".

According to William Bainbridge, atheism is common among people whose social obligations are weak and is also connected to lower fertility rates in some industrial nations. Extended length of sobriety in alcohol recovery is related positively to higher levels of theistic belief, active community helping and self-transcendence. Some studies state that in developed countries health, life expectancy and other correlates of wealth tend to be statistical predictors of a greater percentage of atheists, compared to countries with higher proportions of believers. Multiple methodological problems have been identified with cross-national assessments of religiosity, secularity and social health which undermine conclusive statements on religiosity and secularity in developed democracies.

Modern atheist movements have been criticized for perpetuating patriarchal tendencies and exhibiting sexism, despite internal claims of gender equality.

Historical studies on racism show that atheists have a legacy in racism, including supporting scientific racism. Today, atheist groups are often dominated by white men with very few minorities or women.

== Morality ==
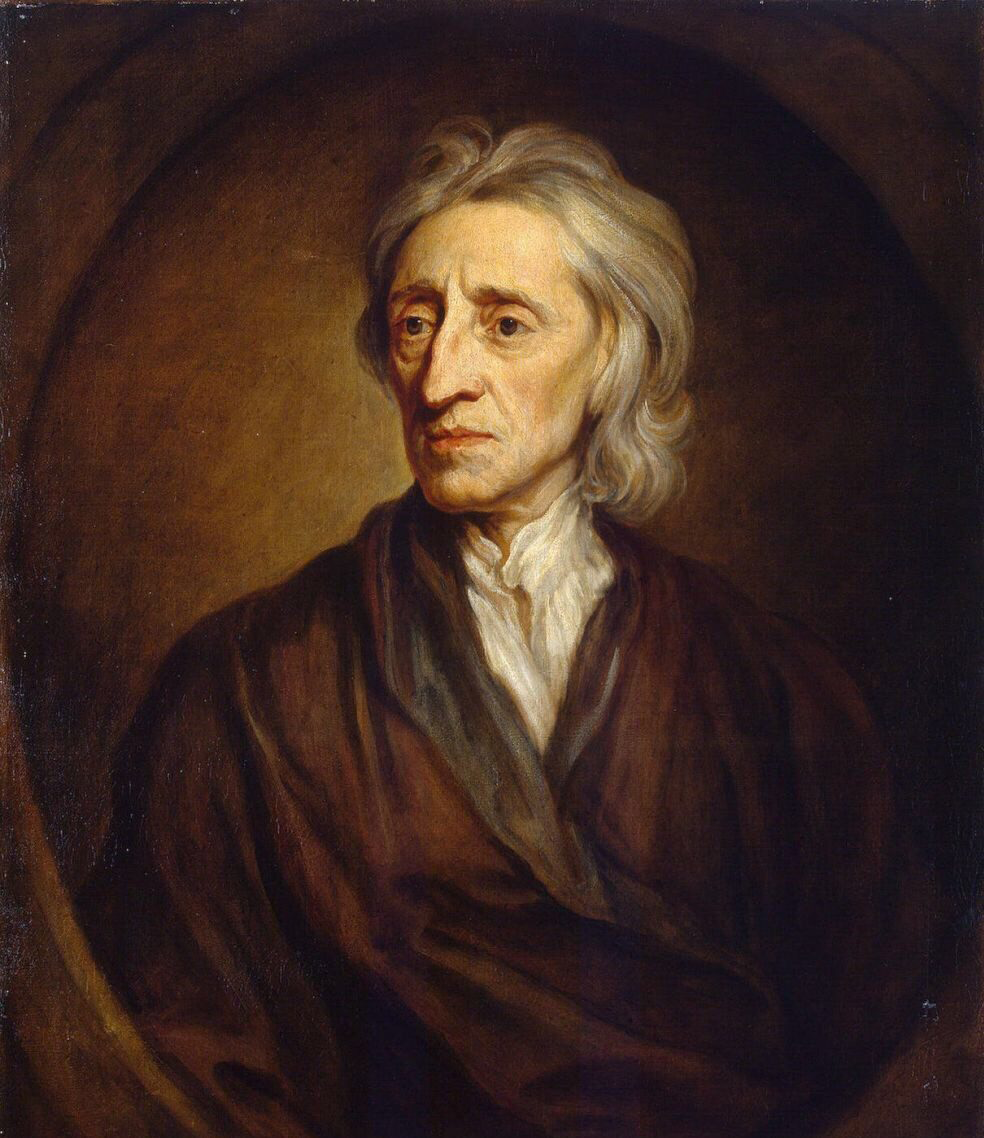
The liberal philosopher John Locke believed that the denial of God's existence would undermine the social order and lead to chaos.

The influential deist philosopher Voltaire criticised established religion to a wide audience, but conceded a fear of the disappearance of the idea of God: "After the French Revolution and its outbursts of atheism, Voltaire was widely condemned as one of the causes", wrote Geoffrey Blainey. "Nonetheless, his writings did concede that fear of God was an essential policeman in a disorderly world: 'If God did not exist, it would be necessary to invent him', wrote Voltaire".

In A Letter Concerning Toleration, the influential English philosopher John Locke wrote: "Promises, covenants, and oaths, which are the bonds of human society, can have no hold upon an atheist. The taking away of God, though but even in thought, dissolves all". Although Locke was believed to be an advocate of tolerance, he urged the authorities not to tolerate atheism because the denial of God's existence would undermine the social order and lead to chaos. According to Dinesh D'Souza, Locke, like Russian novelist Fyodor Dostoyevsky after him, argued that "when God is excluded, then it is not surprising when morality itself is sacrificed in the process and chaos and horror is unleashed on the world".

The Catholic Church believes that morality is ensured through natural law, but that religion provides a more solid foundation. For many years in the United States, atheists were not allowed to testify in court because it was believed that an atheist would have no reason to tell the truth (see also discrimination against atheists).

Atheists such as biologist and popular author Richard Dawkins have proposed that human morality is a result of evolutionary, sociobiological history. He proposes that the "moral zeitgeist" helps describe how moral imperatives and values naturalistically evolve over time from biological and cultural origins. Evolutionary biologist Kenneth R. Miller notes that such a conception of evolution and morality is a misunderstanding of sociobiology and at worst it is an attempt to abolish any meaningful system of morality since though evolution would have provided the biological drives and desires we have, it does not tell us what is good or right or wrong or moral.

Critics assert that natural law provides a foundation on which people may build moral rules to guide their choices and regulate society, but does not provide as strong a basis for moral behavior as a morality that is based in religion. Douglas Wilson, an evangelical theologian, argues that while atheists can behave morally, belief is necessary for an individual "to give a rational and coherent account" of why they are obligated to lead a morally responsible life. Wilson says that atheism is unable to "give an account of why one deed should be seen as good and another as evil". Cardinal Cormac Murphy-O'Connor, outgoing Archbishop of Westminster, expressed this position by describing a lack of faith as "the greatest of evils" and blamed atheism for war and destruction, implying that it was a "greater evil even than sin itself".

According to William Lane Craig, in a world without God people are living in a state where evil is completely unregulated and also permissible, while at the same time good and self-sacrificing people would live in an unrewarded state where noble deeds lose their virtue and are rendered valueless.

According to a global study, there is a prevalence of distrust in moral perceptions of atheists even in secular countries and among atheists.

== Atheism as faith ==
According to some critics, atheism is a faith in itself as a belief in its own right, with a certainty about the falseness of religious beliefs that is comparable to the certainty about the unknown that is practiced by religions. Activist atheists have been criticized for positions said to be similar to religious dogma. In his essay Dogmatic Atheism and Scientific Ignorance for the World Union of Deists, Peter Murphy wrote: "The dogmatic atheist like the dogmatic theist is obsessed with conformity and will spew a tirade of angry words against anyone who does not conform to their own particular world view". The Times arts and entertainment writer Ian Johns described the 2006 British documentary The Trouble with Atheism as "reiterating the point that the dogmatic intensity of atheists is the secular equivalent of the blinkered zeal of fanatical mullahs and biblical fundamentalists". Though the media often portrays atheists as "angry" and studies show that the general population and "believers" perceive atheists as "angry", Brian Meier et al. found that individual atheists are no more angry than individuals in other populations.

In a study on American secularity, Frank Pasquale notes that some tensions do exist among secular groups where, for instance, atheists are sometimes viewed as "fundamentalists" by secular humanists.

In his book First Principles (1862), the 19th-century English philosopher and sociologist Herbert Spencer wrote that as regards the origin of the universe, three hypotheses are possible: self-existence (atheism), self-creation (pantheism), or creation by an external agency (theism). Spencer argued that it is "impossible to avoid making the assumption of self-existence" in any of the three hypotheses and concluded that "even positive Atheism comes within the definition" of religion.

In an anthropological study on modernity, Talal Asad quotes an Arab atheist named Adonis who has said: "The sacred for atheism is the human being himself, the human being of reason, and there is nothing greater than this human being. It replaces revelation by reason and God with humanity". To which Asad points out: "But an atheism that deifies Man is, ironically, close to the doctrine of the incarnation".

Michael Martin and Paul Edwards have responded to criticism-as-faith by emphasizing that atheism can be the rejection of belief, or absence of belief.

Historian of science Michael Ruse states that Darwinism has been treated as religious alternative to Christianity for secularists.

== Catholic perspective ==
The Catechism of the Catholic Church identifies atheism as a violation of the First Commandment, calling it "a sin against the virtue of religion". The catechism is careful to acknowledge that atheism may be motivated by virtuous or moral considerations and admonishes Catholics to focus on their own role in encouraging atheism by their religious or moral shortcomings:

(2125) [...] The imputability of this offense can be significantly diminished in virtue of the intentions and the circumstances. "Believers can have more than a little to do with the rise of atheism. To the extent that they are careless about their instruction in the faith, or present its teaching falsely, or even fail in their religious, moral, or social life, they must be said to conceal rather than to reveal the true nature of God and of religion.

== Historical criticism ==
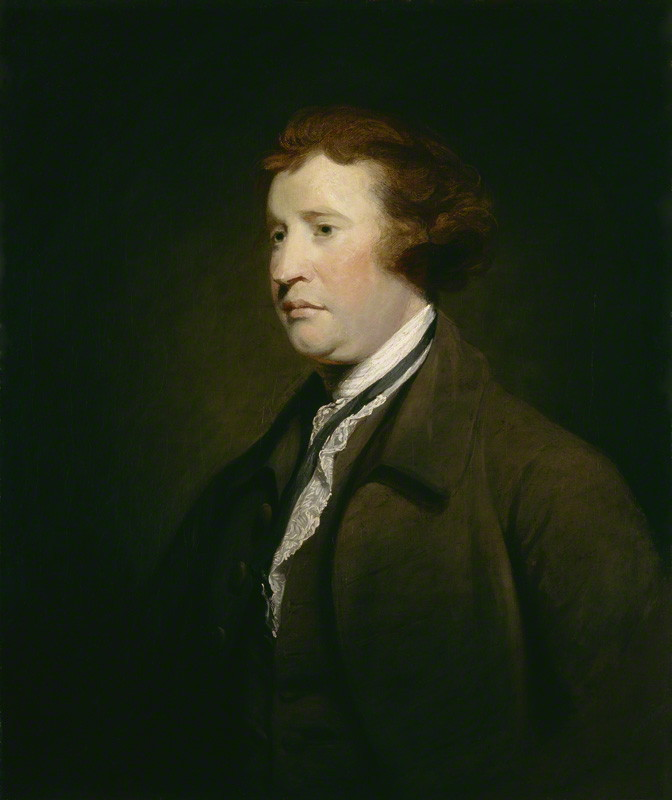
Edmund Burke wrote that atheism is against human reason and instinct.

Those who assert that "there is no God" are described as "foolish" in the Psalms: "They are corrupt, they have done abominable works, there is none that does good."

In his essay On Atheism, Francis Bacon criticized the dispositions towards atheism as being "contrary to wisdom and moral gravity" and being associated with fearing government or public affairs. He also stated that knowing a little science may lead one to atheism, but knowing more science will lead one to religion. In another work called The Advancement of Learning, Bacon stated that superficial knowledge of philosophy inclines one to atheism while more knowledge of philosophy inclines one toward religion.

In Reflections on the Revolution in France, Edmund Burke, an 18th-century Irish philosopher and statesman praised by both his conservative and liberal peers for his "comprehensive intellect", wrote that "man is by his constitution a religious animal; that atheism is against, not only our reason, but our instincts; and that it cannot prevail long". Burke wrote of a "literary cabal" who had "some years ago formed something like a regular plan for the destruction of the Christian religion. This object they pursued with a degree of zeal which hitherto had been discovered only in the propagators of some system of piety... These atheistical fathers have a bigotry of their own; and they have learnt to talk against monks with the spirit of a monk". In turn, wrote Burke, a spirit of atheistic fanaticism had emerged in France.

We know, and, what is better, we feel inwardly, that religion is the basis of civil society, and the source of all good, and of all comfort. In England we are so convinced of this [...] We know, and it is our pride to know, that man is by his constitution a religious animal; that atheism is against, not only our reason, but our instincts; and that it cannot prevail long. But if, in the moment of riot, and in a drunken delirium from the hot spirit drawn out of the alembic of hell, which in France is now so furiously boiling, we should uncover our nakedness, by throwing off that Christian religion which has hitherto been our boast and comfort, and one great source of civilization amongst us, and among many other nations, we are apprehensive (being well aware that the mind will not endure a void) that some uncouth, pernicious, and degrading superstition might take place of it.

— Excerpt from Reflections on the Revolution in France, Edmund Burke, 1790

== Atheism and politics ==
The historian Geoffrey Blainey wrote that during the 20th century atheists in Western societies became more active and even militant, expressing their arguments with clarity and skill. They reject the idea of an interventionist God and they argue that Christianity promotes war and violence. However, Blainey notes that anyone, not just Christians, can promote violence, writing "that the most ruthless leaders in the Second World War were atheists and secularists who were intensely hostile to both Judaism and Christianity. Later massive atrocities were committed in the East by those ardent atheists, Pol Pot and Mao Zedong. All religions, all ideologies, all civilizations display embarrassing blots on their pages".

Philosophers Russell Blackford and Udo Schüklenk have written: "By contrast to all of this, the Soviet Union was undeniably an atheist state, and the same applies to Maoist China and Pol Pot's fanatical Khmer Rouge regime in Cambodia in the 1970s. That does not, however, show that the atrocities committed by these totalitarian dictatorships were all the result of atheist beliefs, carried out in the name of atheism, or caused primarily by the atheistic aspects of the relevant forms of communism". However, they do admit that some forms of persecutions such as those done on churches and religious people were partially related to atheism, but insist it was mostly based on economics and political reasons.

Historian Jeffrey Burton Russell has argued that "atheist rulers such as Lenin, Hitler, Stalin, Mao Zedong and Pol Pot tortured, starved and murdered more people in the twentieth century than all the combined religious regimes of the world during the previous nineteen centuries". He also states: "The antitheist argument boils down to this: a Christian who does evil does so because he is a Christian; an atheist who does evil does so despite being an atheist. The absolute reverse could be argued, but either way it's nothing but spin. The obvious fact is that some Christians do evil in the name of Christianity and some atheists do evil in the name of atheism".

William Husband, a historian of the Soviet secularization has noted: "But the cultivation of atheism in Soviet Russia also possessed distinct characteristic, none more important than the most obvious: atheism was an integral part of the world's first large-scale experiment in communism. The promotion of an antireligious society therefore constitutes an important development in Soviet Russia and in the social history of atheism globally".

=== Early twentieth century ===
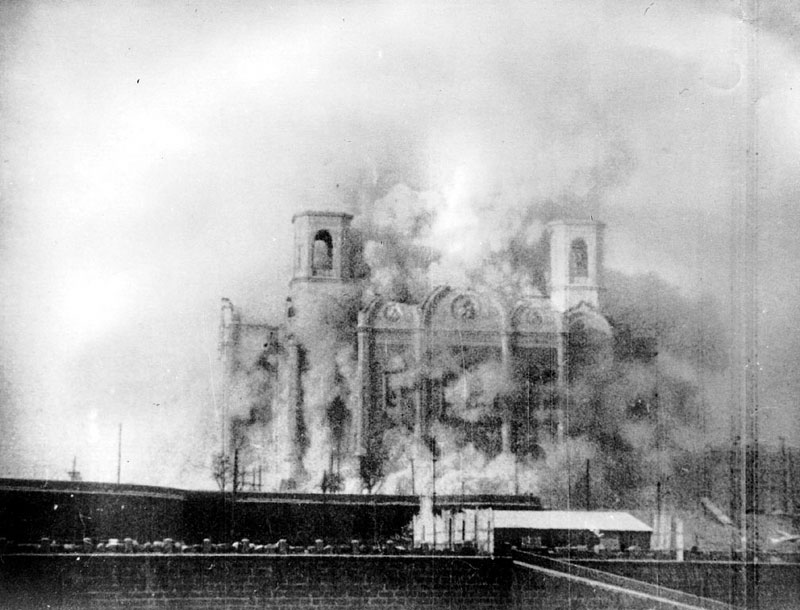
The Cathedral of Christ the Saviour in Moscow during its 1931 demolition as Marxist‒Leninist atheism and other adaptations of Marxian thought on religion have enjoyed the official patronage of various one-party Communist states.

In Julian Baggini's book Atheism: A Very Short Introduction, the author notes: "One of the most serious charges laid against atheism is that it is responsible for some of the worst horrors of the 20th century, including the Nazi concentration camps and Stalin's gulags". However, the author concludes that Nazi Germany was not a "straightforwardly atheist state", but one which sacralized notions of blood and nation in a way that is "foreign to mainstream rational atheism," whereas the Soviet Union was "avowedly and officially an atheist state" – this being not a reason to think that atheism is necessarily evil, though it is a refutation of the idea that atheism must always be benign as "there is I believe a salutary lesson to be learned from the way in which atheism formed an essential part of Soviet Communism, even though Communism does not form an essential part of atheism. This lesson concerns what can happen when atheism becomes too militant and Enlightenment ideals too optimistic".

From the outset, Christians were critical of the spread of militant Marxist‒Leninist atheism, which took hold in Russia following the 1917 Revolution and involved a systematic effort to eradicate religion. In the Soviet Union after the Revolution, teaching religion to the young was criminalized. Marxist‒Leninist atheism and other adaptations of Marxian thought on religion enjoyed the official patronage of various one-party Communist states since 1917. The Bolsheviks pursued "militant atheism". The Soviet leaders Vladimir Lenin and Joseph Stalin energetically pursued the persecution of the Church through the 1920s and 1930s. It was made a criminal offence for priests to teach a child the faith. Many priests were killed and imprisoned. Thousands of churches were closed, some turned into temples of atheism. In 1925, the government founded the League of Militant Atheists, a "nominally independent organization established by the Communist Party to promote atheism" whose pro-atheism activities included active proselytizing of people's personal beliefs, sponsoring lectures, organizing demonstrations, printing and distribution of pamphlets and posters.

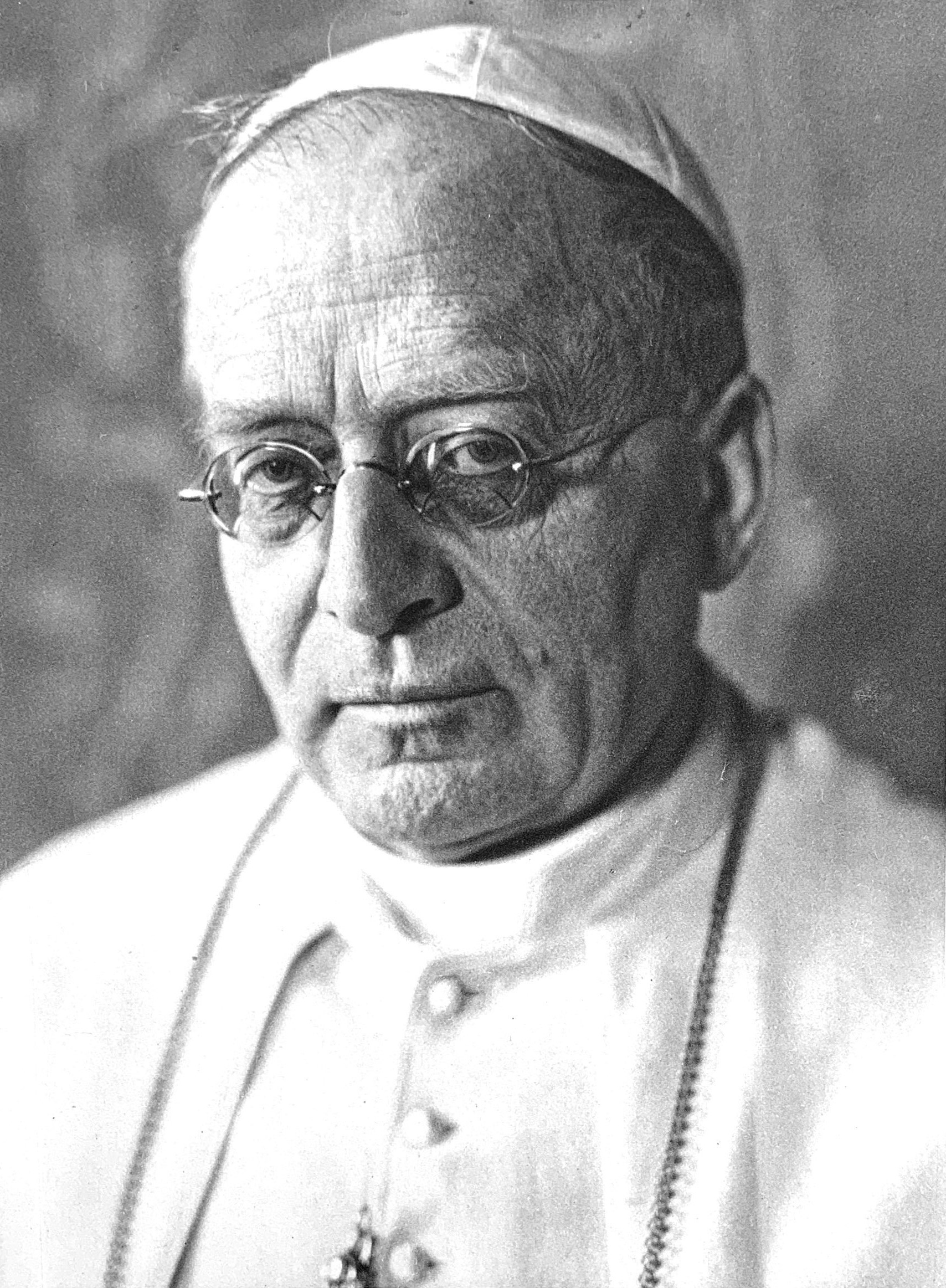
Pope Pius XI reigned during the rise of the dictators in the 1930s and his 1937 encyclical Divini redemptoris denounced the "current trend to atheism which is alarmingly on the increase".

Pope Pius XI reigned from 1922 to 1939 and responded to the rise of totalitarianism in Europe with alarm. He issued three papal encyclicals challenging the new creeds: against Italian Fascism, Non abbiamo bisogno (1931; 'We do not need to acquaint you); against Nazism, Mit brennender Sorge (1937; "With deep concern"); and against atheist Communism, Divini Redemptoris (1937; "Divine Redeemer").

In Divini Redemptoris, Pius XI said that atheistic Communism being led by Moscow was aimed at "upsetting the social order and at undermining the very foundations of Christian civilization":

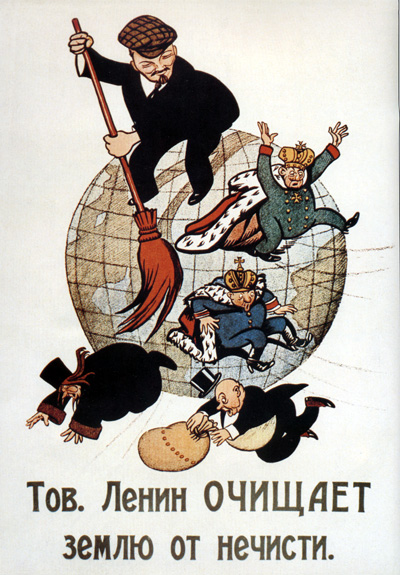
A picture saying "Comrade Lenin Cleanses the Earth of Filth" as Vladimir Lenin was a significant figure in the spread of political atheism in the 20th century and the figure of a priest is among those being swept away.

We too have frequently and with urgent insistence denounced the current trend to atheism which is alarmingly on the increase... We raised a solemn protest against the persecutions unleashed in Russia, in Mexico and now in Spain. [...] In such a doctrine, as is evident, there is no room for the idea of God; there is no difference between matter and spirit, between soul and body; there is neither survival of the soul after death nor any hope in a future life. Insisting on the dialectical aspect of their materialism, the Communists claim that the conflict which carries the world towards its final synthesis can be accelerated by man. Hence they endeavor to sharpen the antagonisms which arise between the various classes of society. Thus the class struggle with its consequent violent hate and destruction takes on the aspects of a crusade for the progress of humanity. On the other hand, all other forces whatever, as long as they resist such systematic violence, must be annihilated as hostile to the human race.

— Excerpts from Divini Redemptoris, Pope Pius XI, 1937

In Fascist Italy, led by the atheist Benito Mussolini, the Pope denounced the efforts of the state to supplant the role of the Church as chief educator of youth and denounced Fascism's "worship" of the state rather than the divine, but Church and state settled on mutual, shaky, toleration.

Historian of the Nazi period Richard J. Evans wrote that the Nazis encouraged atheism and deism over Christianity and encouraged party functionaries to abandon their religion. Priests were watched closely and frequently denounced, arrested and sent to concentration camps. In Hitler and Stalin: Parallel Lives, the historian Alan Bullock wrote that Hitler, like Napoleon before him, frequently employed the language of "Providence" in defence of his own myth, but ultimately shared with the Soviet dictator Joseph Stalin "the same materialist outlook, based on the nineteenth century rationalists' certainty that the progress of science would destroy all myths and had already proved Christian doctrine to be an absurdity". By 1939, all Catholic denominational schools in the Third Reich had been disbanded or converted to public facilities. In this climate, Pope Pius XI issued his anti-Nazi encyclical, Mit Brennender Sorge in 1937, saying:

It is on faith in God, preserved pure and stainless, that man's morality is based. All efforts to remove from under morality and the moral order the granite foundation of faith and to substitute for it the shifting sands of human regulations, sooner or later lead these individuals or societies to moral degradation. The fool who has said in his heart "there is no God" goes straight to moral corruption (Psalms xiii. 1), and the number of these fools who today are out to sever morality from religion, is legion.

— Excerpt from Mit brennender Sorge, Pope Pius XI, 1937

Pius XI died on the eve of World War II. Following the outbreak of war and the 1939 Nazi, and subsequently Soviet, invasion of Poland, the newly elected Pope Pius XII again denounced the eradication of religious education in his first encyclical, saying: "Perhaps the many who have not grasped the importance of the educational and pastoral mission of the Church will now understand better her warnings, scouted in the false security of the past. No defense of Christianity could be more effective than the present straits. From the immense vortex of error and anti-Christian movements there has come forth a crop of such poignant disasters as to constitute a condemnation surpassing in its conclusiveness any merely theoretical refutation".

Post-war Christian leaders including Pope John Paul II continued the Christian critique. In 2010, his successor, the German Pope Benedict XVI said:

Even in our own lifetime, we can recall how Britain and her leaders stood against a Nazi tyranny that wished to eradicate God from society and denied our common humanity to many, especially the Jews, who were thought unfit to live. I also recall the regime's attitude to Christian pastors and religious who spoke the truth in love, opposed the Nazis and paid for that opposition with their lives. As we reflect on the sobering lessons of the atheist extremism of the twentieth century, let us never forget how the exclusion of God, religion and virtue from public life leads ultimately to a truncated vision of man and of society and thus to a reductive vision of the person and his destiny

— Speech by Pope Benedict XVI, 2010

British biologist Richard Dawkins criticised Pope Benedict's remarks and said that "Hitler certainly was not an atheist. In 1933 he claimed to have 'stamped atheism out'". In contrast, historian Alan Bullock wrote that Hitler was a rationalist and a materialist with no feeling for the spiritual or emotional side of human existence: a "man who believed neither in God nor in conscience". Anton Gill has written that Hitler wanted Catholicism to have "nothing at all to do with German society". Richard Overy describes Hitler as skeptical of all religious belief Critic of atheism Dinesh D'Souza argues that "Hitler's leading advisers, such as Goebbels, Heydrich and Bormann, were atheists who were savagely hostile to religion" and Hitler and the Nazis "repudiated what they perceived as the Christian values of equality, compassion and weakness and extolled the atheist notions of the Nietzschean superman and a new society based on the 'will to power'".

When Hitler was out campaigning for power in Germany, he made opportunistic statements apparently in favour of "positive Christianity". In political speeches, Hitler spoke of an "almighty creator". According to Samuel Koehne of Deakin University, some recent works have "argued Hitler was a Deist". Hitler made various comments against "atheistic" movements. He associated atheism with Bolshevism, Communism and Jewish materialism. In 1933, the regime banned most atheistic and freethinking groups in Germany—other than those that supported the Nazis. The regime strongly opposed "godless communism" and most of Germany's freethinking (freigeist), atheist and largely left-wing organizations were banned. The regime also stated that the Nazi Germany needed some kind of belief.

According to Tom Rees, some researches suggest that atheists are more numerous in peaceful nations than they are in turbulent or warlike ones, but causality of this trend is not clear and there are many outliers. However, opponents of this view cite examples such as the Bolsheviks (in Soviet Russia) who were inspired by "an ideological creed which professed that all religion would atrophy [...] resolved to eradicate Christianity as such". In 1918, "[t]en Orthodox hierarchs were summarily shot" and "[c]hildren were deprived of any religious education outside the home". Increasingly draconian measures were employed. In addition to direct state persecution, the League of the Militant Godless was founded in 1925, churches were closed and vandalized and "by 1938 eighty bishops had lost their lives, while thousands of clerics were sent to labour camps".

=== After World War II ===
Across Eastern Europe following World War II, the parts of Nazi Germany and its allies and conquered states that had been overrun by the Soviet Red Army, along with Yugoslavia, became one-party Communist states, which like the Soviet Union were antipathetic to religion. Persecutions of religious leaders followed. The Soviet Union ended its truce against the Russian Orthodox Church and extended its persecutions to the newly Communist Eastern bloc. In Poland, Hungary, Lithuania and other Eastern European countries, Catholic leaders who were unwilling to be silent were denounced, publicly humiliated or imprisoned by the Communists. According to Geoffrey Blainey, leaders of the national Orthodox Churches in Romania and Bulgaria had to be "cautious and submissive".

Albania under Enver Hoxha became in 1967 the first (and to date only) formally declared atheist state, going far beyond what most other countries had attempted—completely prohibiting religious observance and systematically repressing and persecuting adherents. The right to religious practice was restored in the fall of communism in 1991. In 1967, Hoxha's regime conducted a campaign to extinguish religious life in Albania and by year's end over two thousand religious buildings were closed or converted to other uses and religious leaders were imprisoned and executed. Albania was declared to be the world's first atheist country by its leaders and Article 37 of the Albanian constitution of 1976 stated: "The State recognises no religion, and supports and carries out atheistic propaganda in order to implant a scientific materialistic world outlook in people".

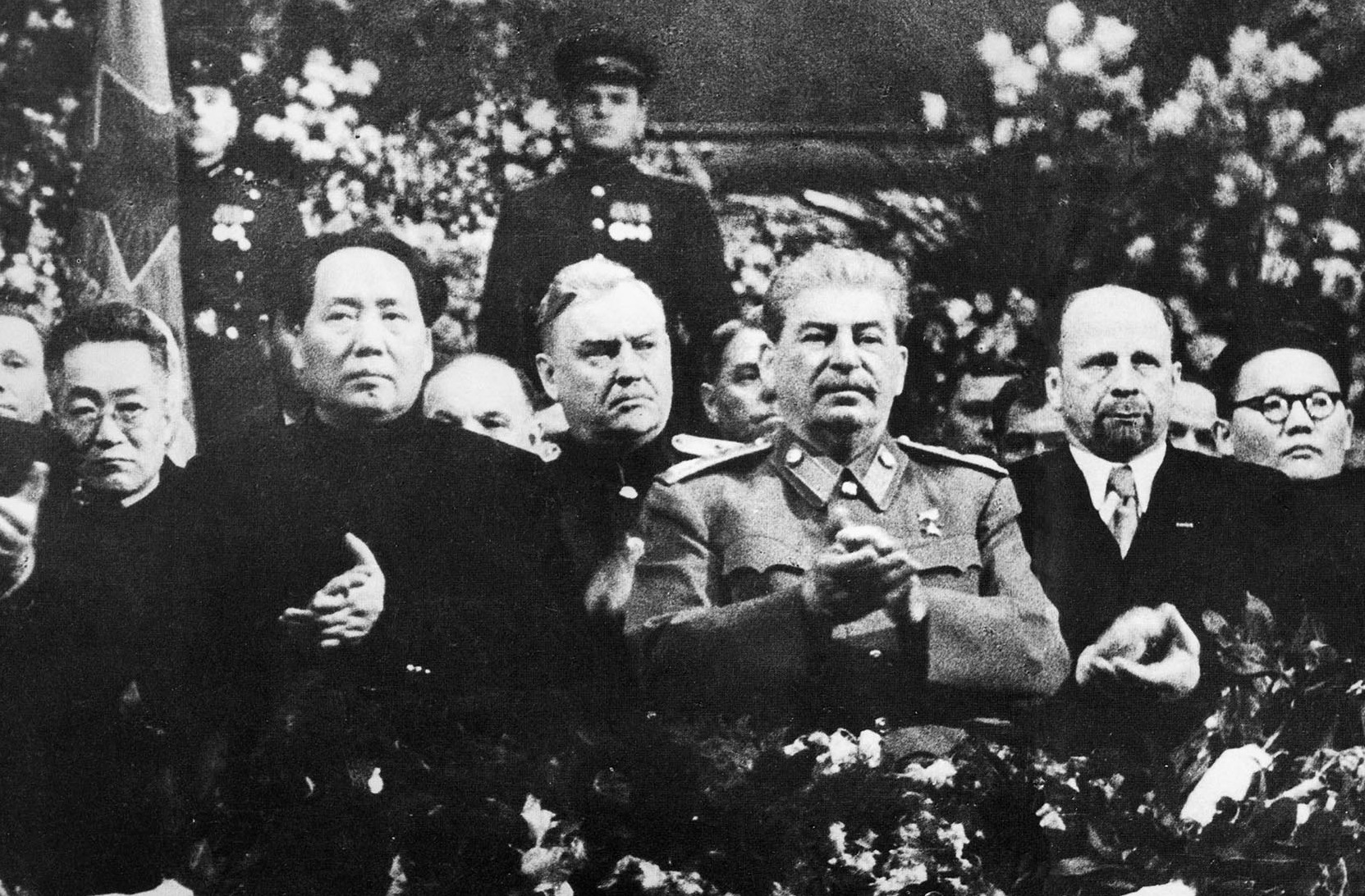
Mao Zedong with Joseph Stalin in 1949 as both leaders repressed religion and established state atheism throughout their respective Communist spheres

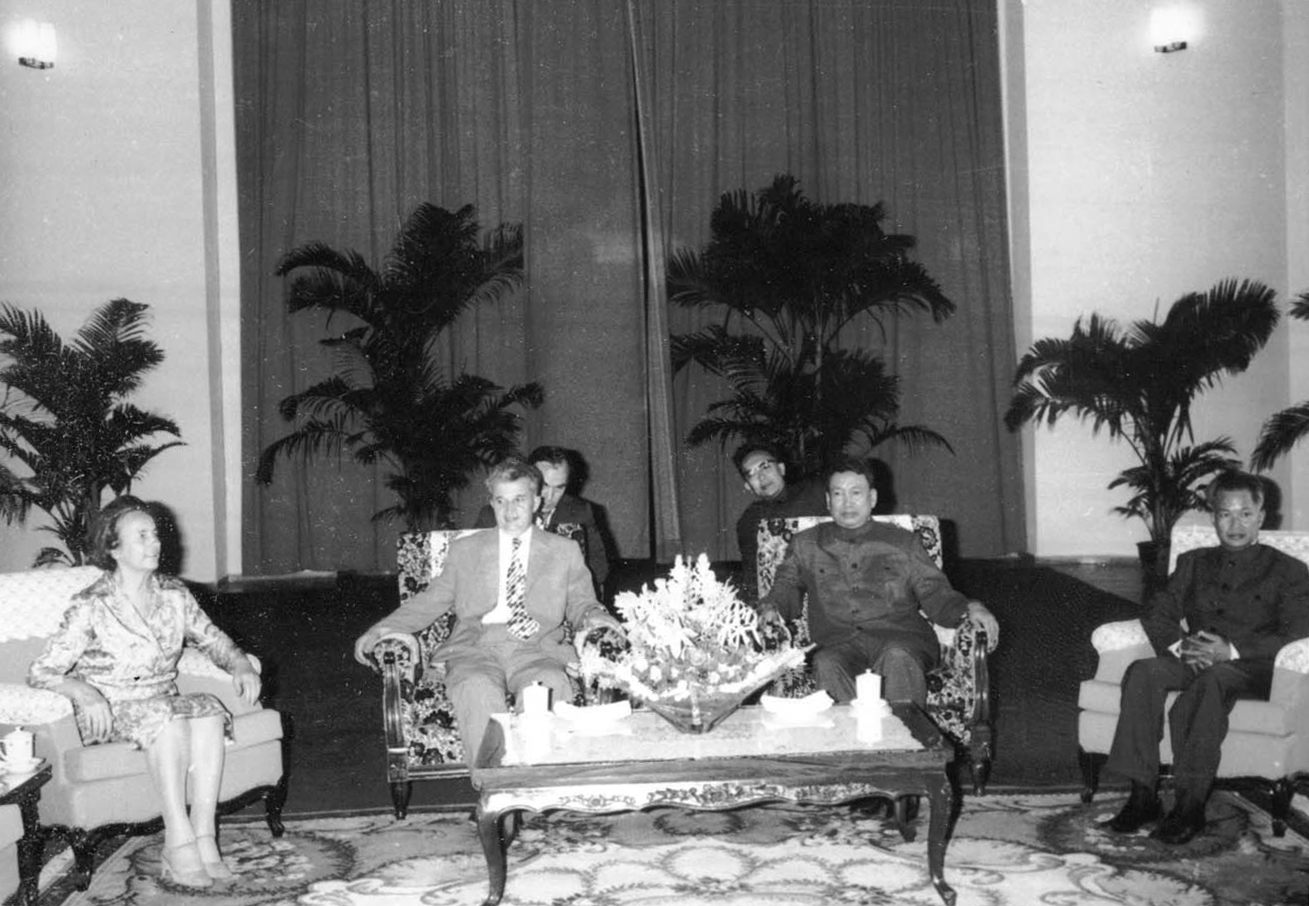
Nicolae Ceauşescu, here with Pol Pot in 1978, launched a persecution of religion in Romania to implement the doctrine of Marxist–Leninist atheism, while Pol Pot banned religious practices in Cambodia.

In 1949, China became a Communist state under the leadership of Mao Zedong's Chinese Communist Party. China itself had been a cradle of religious thought since ancient times, being the birthplace of Confucianism and Daoism. Under Communism, China became officially atheist, and though some religious practices were permitted to continue under state supervision, religious groups deemed a threat to order have been suppressed—as with Tibetan Buddhism since 1959 and Falun Gong in recent years. During the Cultural Revolution, Mao instigated "struggles" against the Four Olds: "old ideas, customs, culture, and habits of mind". In Buddhist Cambodia, influenced by Mao's Cultural Revolution, Pol Pot's Khmer Rouge also instigated a purge of religion during the Cambodian genocide, when all religious practices were forbidden and Buddhist monasteries were closed. Evangelical Christian writer Dinesh D'Souza writes: "The crimes of atheism have generally been perpetrated through a hubristic ideology that sees man, not God, as the creator of values. Using the latest techniques of science and technology, man seeks to displace God and create a secular utopia here on earth". He also contends:

And who can deny that Stalin and Mao, not to mention Pol Pot and a host of others, all committed atrocities in the name of a Communist ideology that was explicitly atheistic? Who can dispute that they did their bloody deeds by claiming to be establishing a 'new man' and a religion-free utopia? These were mass murders performed with atheism as a central part of their ideological inspiration, they were not mass murders done by people who simply happened to be atheist.

In response to this line of criticism, Sam Harris wrote:

The problem with fascism and communism, however, is not that they are too critical of religion; the problem is that they are too much like religions. Such regimes are dogmatic to the core and generally give rise to personality cults that are indistinguishable from cults of religious hero worship. Auschwitz, the gulag and the killing fields were not examples of what happens when human beings reject religious dogma; they are examples of political, racial and nationalistic dogma run amok. There is no society in human history that ever suffered because its people became too reasonable.

Richard Dawkins has stated that Stalin's atrocities were influenced not by atheism, but by dogmatic Marxism and concludes that while Stalin and Mao happened to be atheists, they did not do their deeds "in the name of atheism". On other occasions, Dawkins has replied to the argument that Hitler and Stalin were antireligious with the response that Hitler and Stalin also grew moustaches in an effort to show the argument as fallacious. Instead, Dawkins argues in The God Delusion: "What matters is not whether Hitler and Stalin were atheists, but whether atheism systematically influences people to do bad things. There is not the smallest evidence that it does".

Historian Borden Painter assessed Dawkins' claims on Stalin, atheism and violence in light of mainstream historical scholarship, stating that Dawkins did not use reliable sources to reach his conclusions. He argues: "He omits what any textbook would tell him: Marxism included atheism as a piece of its secular ideology that claimed a basis in scientific thinking originating in the Enlightenment". D'Souza responds to Dawkins that an individual need not explicitly invoke atheism in committing atrocities if it is already implied in his worldview as is the case in Marxism.

In a 1993 address to American bishops, Pope John Paul II spoke of a spreading "practical atheism" in modern societies which was clouding the moral sense of humans and fragmenting society:

[T]he disciple of Christ is constantly challenged by a spreading "practical atheism" – an indifference to God's loving plan which obscures the religious and moral sense of the human heart. Many either think and act as if God did not exist, or tend to "privatize" religious belief and practice, so that there exists a bias towards indifferentism and the elimination of any real reference to binding truths and moral values. When the basic principles which inspire and direct human behavior are fragmentary and even at times contradictory, society increasingly struggles to maintain harmony and a sense of its own destiny. In a desire to find some common ground on which to build its programmes and policies, it tends to restrict the contribution of those whose moral conscience is formed by their religious beliefs.

— Pope John Paul II, 11 November 1993

Journalist Robert Wright has argued that some New Atheists discourage looking for deeper root causes of conflicts when they assume that religion is the sole root of the problem. Wright argues that this can discourage people from working to change the circumstances that actually give rise to those conflicts. Mark Chaves has said that the New Atheists, amongst others who comment on religions, have committed the religious congruence fallacy in their writings by assuming that beliefs and practices remain static and coherent through time. He believes that the late Christopher Hitchens committed this error by assuming that the drive for congruence is a defining feature of religion and that Daniel Dennett has done it by overlooking the fact that religious actions are dependent on the situation, just like other actions.

== Atheism and science ==
Early modern atheism developed in the 17th century and Winfried Schroeder, a historian of atheism, has noted that science during this time did not strengthen the case for atheism. In the 18th century, Denis Diderot argued that atheism was less scientific than metaphysics. Prior to Charles Darwin, the findings of biology did not play a major part in the atheist's arguments since it was difficult to argue that life arose randomly as opposed to being designed. As Schroeder has noted, throughout the 17th and 18th centuries theists excelled atheists in their ability to make contributions to the serious study of biological processes. In the time of the Enlightenment, mechanical philosophy was developed by Christians such as Isaac Newton, René Descartes, Robert Boyle and Pierre Gassendi who saw a self-sustained and autonomous universe as an intrinsically Christian belief. The mechanical world was seen as providing strong evidence against atheism since nature had evidence of order and providence, instead of chaos and spontaneity. However, since the 19th century both atheists and theists have said that science supports their worldviews. Historian of science John Henry has noted that before the 19th century science was generally cited to support many theological positions. However, materialist theories in natural philosophy became more prominent from the 17th century onwards, giving more room for atheism to develop. Since the 19th century, science has been employed in both theistic and atheistic cultures, depending on the prevailing popular beliefs.

In reviewing the rise of modern science, Taner Edis notes that science does work without atheism and that atheism largely remains a position that is adopted for philosophical or ethical, rather than scientific reasons. The history of atheism is heavily invested in the philosophy of religion and this has resulted in atheism being weakly tied to other branches of philosophy and almost completely disconnected from science which means that it risks becoming stagnant and completely irrelevant to science.

Sociologist Steve Fuller wrote: "Atheism as a positive doctrine has done precious little for science". He notes: "More generally, Atheism has not figured as a force in the history of science not because it has been suppressed but because whenever it has been expressed, it has not specifically encouraged the pursuit of science".

Massimo Pigliucci noted that the Soviet Union had adopted an atheist ideology called Lysenkoism, which rejected Mendelian genetics and Darwinian evolution as capitalist propaganda, which was in sync with Stalin's dialectic materialism and ultimately impeded biological and agricultural research for many years, including the exiling and deaths of many valuable scientists. This part of history has symmetries with other ideologically driven ideas such as intelligent design, though in both cases religion and atheism are not the main cause, but blind commitments to worldviews.

According to historian Geoffrey Blainey, in recent centuries literalist biblical accounts were undermined by scientific discoveries in archaeology, astronomy, biology, chemistry, geoscience, and physics, leading various thinkers to question the idea that God created the universe at all. However, he also notes: "Other scholars replied that the universe was so astonishing, so systematic, and so varied that it must have a divine maker. Criticisms of the accuracy of the Book of Genesis were therefore illuminating, but minor". Some philosophers, such as Alvin Plantinga, have argued the universe was fine-tuned for life. Atheists have sometimes responded by referring to the anthropic principle.

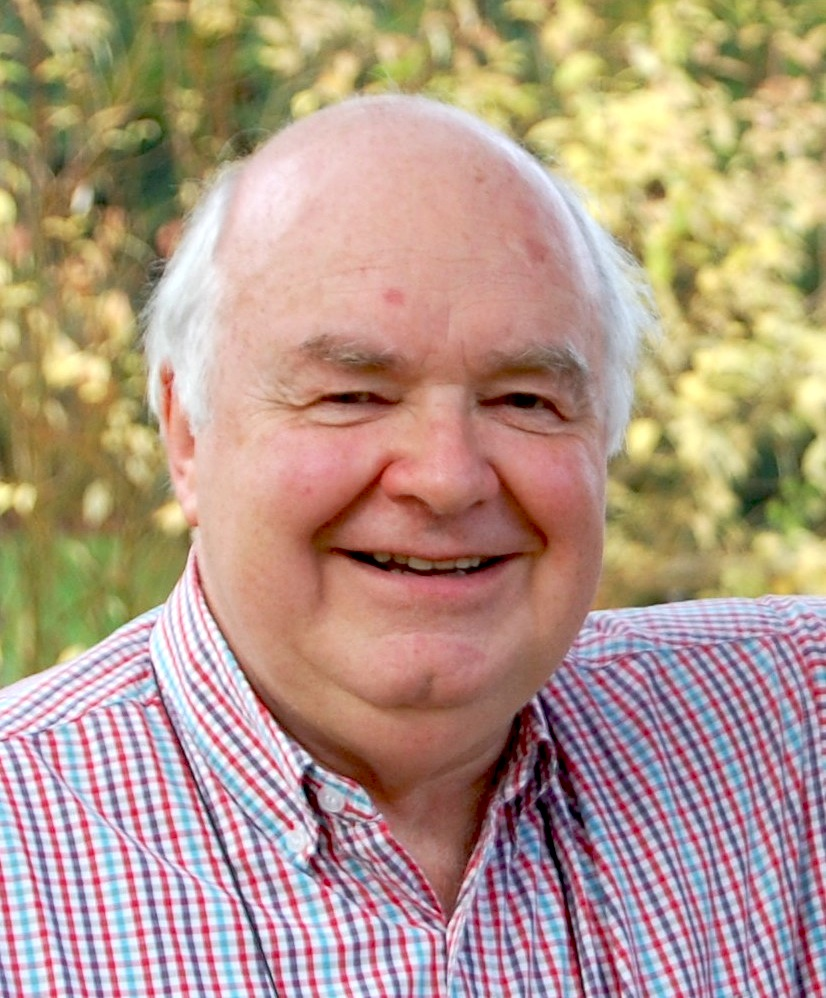
British mathematician and philosopher of science John Lennox

Physicist Karl W. Giberson and philosopher of science Mariano Artigas reviewed the views of some notable atheist scientists such as Carl Sagan, Richard Dawkins, Stephen Jay Gould, Stephen Hawking, Steven Weinberg and E. O. Wilson which have engaged popular writing which include commentary on what science is, society and religion for the lay public. Giberson and Artigas note that though such authors provide insights from their fields, they often misinform the public by engaging in non-scientific commentary on society, religion and meaning under the guise of non-existent scientific authority and no scientific evidence. Some impressions these six authors make that are erroneous and false include: science is mainly about origins and that most scientists work in some aspect of either cosmic or biological evolution, scientists are either agnostic or atheistic and science is incompatible and even hostile to religion. To these impressions, Giberson and Artigas note that the overwhelming majority of science articles in any journal in any field have nothing to do with origins because most research is funded by taxpayers or private corporations so ultimately practical research that benefit people, the environment, health and technology are the core focus of science; significant portions of scientists are religious and spiritual; and the majority of scientists are not hostile to religion since no scientific organization has any stance that is critical to religion, the scientific community is diverse in terms of worldviews and there is no collective opinion on religion.

Primatologist Frans de Waal has criticized atheists for often presenting science and religion to audiences in a simplistic and false view of conflict, thereby propagating a myth that has been dispelled by history. He notes that there are dogmatic parallels between atheists and some religious people in terms of how they argue about many issues.

Evolutionary biologist Kenneth R. Miller has argued that when scientists make claims on science and theism or atheism, they are not arguing scientifically at all and are stepping beyond the scope of science into discourses of meaning and purpose. What he finds particularly odd and unjustified is in how atheists often come to invoke scientific authority on their non-scientific philosophical conclusions like there being no point or no meaning to the universe as the only viable option when the scientific method and science never have had any way of addressing questions of meaning or lack of meaning, or the existence or non-existence of God in the first place. Atheists do the same thing theists do on issues not pertaining to science like questions on God and meaning.

Theologian scientist Alister McGrath points out that atheists have misused biology in terms of both evolution as "Darwinism" and Darwin himself, in their "atheist apologetics" in order to propagate and defend their worldviews. He notes that in atheist writings there is often an implicit appeal to an outdated "conflict" model of science and religion which has been discredited by historical scholarship, there is a tendency to go beyond science to make non-scientific claims like lack of purpose and characterizing Darwin as if he was an atheist and his ideas as promoting atheism. McGrath notes that Darwin never called himself an atheist nor did he and other early advocates of evolution see his ideas as propagating atheism and that numerous contributors to evolutionary biology were Christians.

Oxford Professor of Mathematics John Lennox has written that the issues one hears about science and religion have nothing to do with science, but are merely about theism and atheism because top level scientists abound on both sides. Furthermore, he criticizes atheists who argue from scientism because sometimes it results in dismissals of things like philosophy based on ignorance of what philosophy entails and the limits of science. He also notes that atheist scientists in trying to avoid the visible evidence for God ascribe creative power to less credible candidates like mass and energy, the laws of nature and theories of those laws. Lennox notes that theories that Hawking appeals to such as the multiverse are speculative and untestable and thus do not amount to science.

Physicist Paul Davies of Arizona State University has written that the very notion of physical law is a theological one in the first place: "Isaac Newton first got the idea of absolute, universal, perfect, immutable laws from the Christian doctrine that God created the world and ordered it in a rational way". John Lennox has argued that science itself sits more comfortably with theism than with atheism and "as a scientist I would say... where did modern science come from? It didn't come from atheism... modern science arose in the 16th and 17th centuries in Western Europe, and of course people ask why did it happen there and then, and the general consensus which is often called Merton's Thesis is, to quote CS Lewis who formulated it better than anybody I know... 'Men became scientific. Why? Because they expected law in nature, and they expected law in nature because they believed in a lawgiver.' In other words, it was belief in God that was the motor that drove modern science".

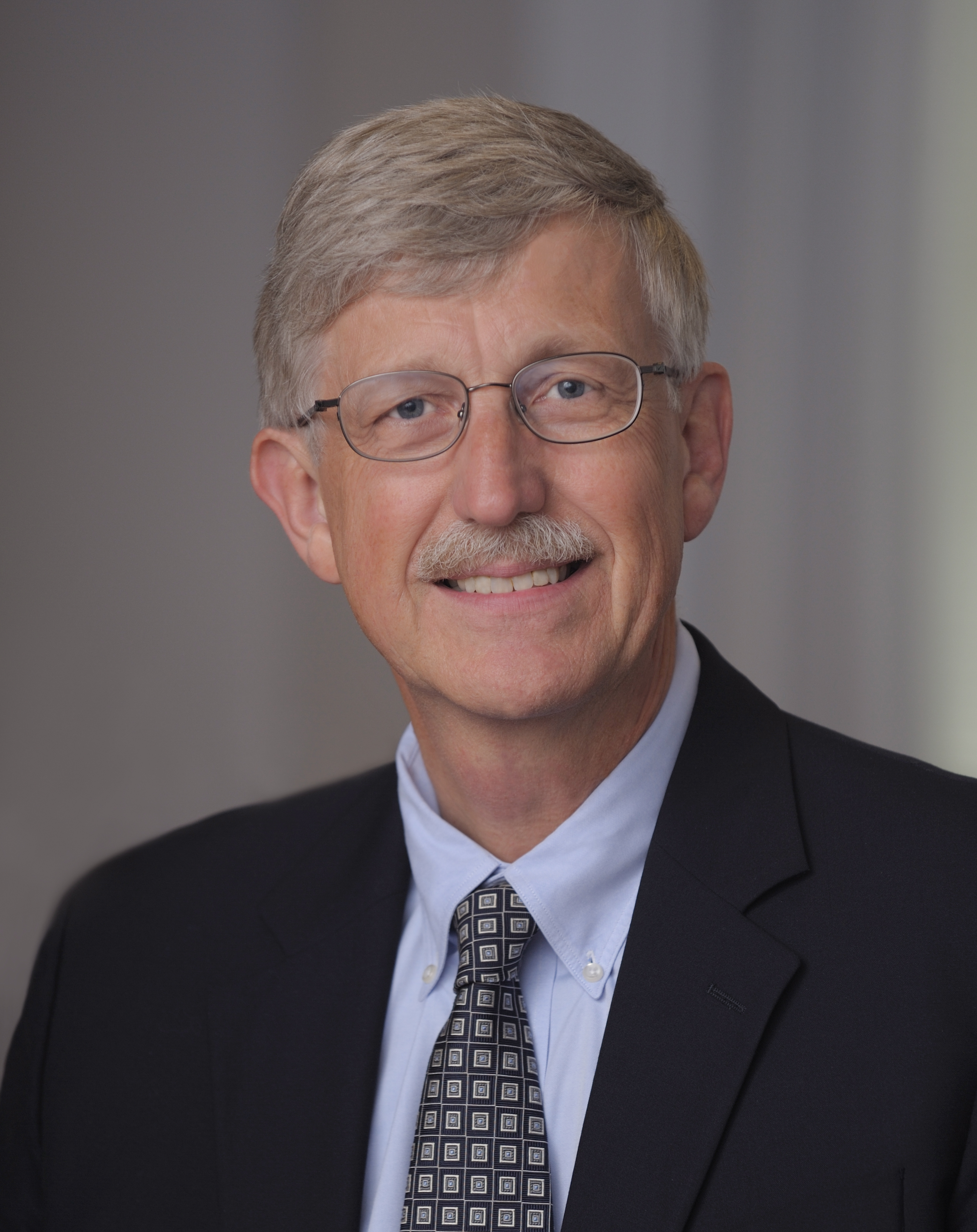
American physician geneticist Francis Collins

Francis Collins, the American physician and geneticist who led the Human Genome Project, argues that theism is more rational than atheism. Collins also found Lewis persuasive and after reading Mere Christianity came to believe that a rational person would be more likely to believe in a god. Collins argues: "How is it that we, and all other members of our species, unique in the animal kingdom, know what's right and what's wrong... I reject the idea that that is an evolutionary consequence, because that moral law sometimes tells us that the right thing to do is very self-destructive. If I'm walking down the riverbank, and a man is drowning, even if I don't know how to swim very well, I feel this urge that the right thing to do is to try to save that person. Evolution would tell me exactly the opposite: preserve your DNA. Who cares about the guy who's drowning? He's one of the weaker ones, let him go. It's your DNA that needs to survive. And yet that's not what's written within me".

Dawkins addresses this criticism by showing that the evolutionary process can account for the development of altruistic traits in organisms. However, molecular biologist Kenneth R. Miller argues that Dawkins' conception of evolution and morality is a misunderstanding of sociobiology since though evolution would have provided the biological drives and desires we have, it does not tell us what is good or right or wrong or moral.

== New Atheism ==
In the early 21st century, a group of authors and media personalities in Britain and the United States—often referred to as the "New Atheists"—have argued that religion must be proactively countered, criticized so as to reduce its influence on society. Prominent among these voices have been Christopher Hitchens, Richard Dawkins, Daniel Dennett and Sam Harris.

One critic of New Atheism has been the American-Iranian religious studies scholar Reza Aslan. In a New York interview in 2014, Aslan argued that the New Atheists held an "often comically simplistic view of religion that gave atheism a bad name" and continued:

This is not the philosophical atheism of Schopenhauer or Marx or Freud or Feuerbach. This is a sort of unthinking, simplistic religious criticism. It is primarily being fostered by individuals—like Sam Harris, Richard Dawkins—who have absolutely no background in the study of religion at all. ... What we’re seeing now instead is a sort of armchair atheism—people who are inundated by what they see on the news or in media, and who then draw these incredibly simplistic generalizations about religion in general based on these examples that they see.

Professor of comparative studies Jeff Nall argues that the New Atheists provide a foundation that is embedded in errors and fallacies for "fundamentalist atheists". He asserts that fundamentalist atheism seeks to eradicate religion and anoint atheism, based on three major fallacies: firstly, an intellectual tunnel vision and failure to accurately examine religious belief honestly in favour of labelling religion as violent, averse to critical debate, scientific development, tolerance, and social advancement; secondly, treating fundamentalist forms of religion as the root of all evil and as the norm on all religion; and, thirdly, intellectual intolerance toward religious thought and belief.

Professor of anthropology and sociology Jack David Eller believes that the four principal New Atheist authors—Hitchens, Dawkins, Dennett and Harris—were not offering anything new in terms of arguments to disprove the existence of gods. He also criticized them for their focus on the dangers of theism as opposed to the falsifying of theism, which results in mischaracterizing religions, taking local theisms as the essence of religion itself and for focusing on the negative aspects of religion in the form of an "argument from benefit" in the reverse.

Professors of philosophy and religion Jeffrey Robbins and Christopher Rodkey take issue with "the evangelical nature of the new atheism, which assumes that it has a Good News to share, at all cost, for the ultimate future of humanity by the conversion of as many people as possible". They find similarities between the new atheism and evangelical Christianity and conclude that the all-consuming nature of both "encourages endless conflict without progress" between both extremities. Sociologist William Stahl notes: "What is striking about the current debate is the frequency with which the New Atheists are portrayed as mirror images of religious fundamentalists". He discusses where both have "structural and epistemological parallels" and argues that "both the New Atheism and fundamentalism are attempts to recreate authority in the face of crises of meaning in late modernity".

The English philosopher Roger Scruton has said that saying that religion is damaging to mankind is just as ridiculous as saying that love is damaging to mankind. Like love, religion leads to conflict, cruelty, abuse and even wars, yet it also brings people joy, solitude, hope and redemption. He therefore states that New Atheists cherry-pick, ignoring the most crucial arguments in the favour of religion, whilst also reiterating the few arguments against religion. He has also stated that religion is an irrefutable part of the human condition, and that denying this is futile.

American religious studies scholar David Bentley Hart criticized New Atheism in Atheist Delusions for being "as contemptible as any other form of dreary fundamentalism" because it "consists entirely in vacuous arguments afloat on oceans of historical ignorance, made turbulent by storms of strident self-righteousness." Of the leading New Atheists, Hart has the most respect for Daniel Dennett, but concludes that "Dennett's argument consists in little more than the persistent misapplication of quantitative and empirical terms to unquantifiable and intrinsically nonempirical realities" and "sustained by classifications that are entirely arbitrary."

Richard Dawkins ...does not hesitate, for instance, to claim that "natural selection is the ultimate explanation for our existence." But this is a silly assertion and merely reveals that Dawkins does not understand the words he is using. The question of existence does not concern how it is that the present arrangement of the world came about, from causes already internal to the world, but how it is that anything (including any cause) can exist at all.

In The Experience of God (2013), Hart primarily makes the case that most criticisms of theism by the New Atheists do not apply to the God of classical theism but instead to a deistic deity conceived of much later in history. Along the way, Hart covers many other specific topics including extended critiques of Daniel Dennett's philosophy of mind and an outline of logical failures in The Selfish Gene by Richard Dawkins.

== See also ==
- Apologetics
- Conflict thesis
- Criticism of New Atheism
- History of atheism
- Implicit and explicit atheism
- List of former atheists and agnostics
- Myth of progress
- Nontheistic religions
- State atheism
- The Rage Against God
- The Twilight of Atheism
- There are no atheists in foxholes
- Weak and strong atheism
