= A Scientific Theology =

Book by Alister McGrath

A Scientific Theology is a set of three books by Alister McGrath that explores the parallels between the working assumptions and methods of Christian theology and those of the natural sciences. Scientific Theology is also the "running title" of the project which gave rise to the trilogy. The work is preceded by three volumes that McGrath describes as "landmarks" in the development of his scientific theology: The Genesis of Doctrine: A Study in the Foundations of Doctrinal Criticism, The Foundations of Dialogue in Science and Religion and Thomas F. Torrance: An Intellectual Biography. The trilogy was later summarised in The Science of God. McGrath is working on a "scientific dogmatics" which will deal with the content of Christian theology following the method developed in the trilogy.

== The concept of "scientific theology" ==
=== Overview ===
Since at least the time of the 2nd century apologists Christian theology has sought to relate itself to major intellectual trends. In earlier periods this meant engagement with Platonism and Aristotelianism. But as these philosophical systems waned under the increasing influence of natural philosophy (later "science") so Christian theology increasingly tended to focus on engagement with the natural sciences.

This engagement would eventually lead to the idea that Christian Theology itself should be "scientific" and by the earlier part of the 20th century calls were being made for a "scientific theology". This call has been answered in various ways.

These various approaches to "scientific theology" may be loosely categorised as "methodological" or "doctrinal" depending upon their primary focus. These concerns, however, are by no means mutually exclusive.

A "methodological" approach is concerned with practicing theology in a "scientific" manner and focuses on clearly articulating the assumptions, methods, and related thought-forms to be taken into account in the construction of dogmatic formulations.

A "doctrinal" approach is concerned with the inter-relationship of scientific and doctrinal content and focuses on formulating Christian theology against a framework of specific scientific theorems.

=== McGrath's approach to "scientific theology" ===
By a “scientific theology” McGrath does not mean an attempt to reconcile particular Christian beliefs with particular scientific theorems. Such efforts are regarded by him as pointless because they become outdated with scientific progress. Rather, McGrath seeks to draw upon the proven assumptions and methods of the natural sciences in order to inform the practice of Christian theology.

Such an approach is grounded in the fundamental belief that Christian theology seeks to describe the same God who (in whatever way) created the natural order which the natural sciences seek to describe. The assumption is that a theological investigation of reality can be informed by the approach taken in a scientific investigation of reality.

It is critical to distinguish levels of reality so that each level is investigated according to its appropriate methods. On this basis, the reality of God and the contingent reality of the created order are taken as distinct although still related levels of reality. This is not regarded as a self-evident truth, but acknowledged to be a claim of Christian theology which is based in revelation.

It is the Christian understanding of revelation as disclosure of an objective reality that justifies, in McGrath's view, claims of a correspondence between the assumptions and methods of Christian theology and those of the natural sciences. He argues that just as the natural sciences are an investigation of the objective reality of the natural order, so Christian theology is an investigation of the (revealed) objective reality of God.

Christian theology and the natural sciences, therefore, are both a response to reality and so must proceed a posteriori-that is from observations (i.e. of revealed or natural data respectively) to dogmas/theorems.

Ideally, neither discipline confuses its theoretical constructs with the reality it seeks to describe. Both should be critical of their dogmas/theorems and constantly put them to the test. For Christian theology this means continually assessing Christian faith and practice against the revelation of God in Jesus Christ “the incarnate word.”

In this work McGrath commits himself to an approach that seeks to avoid the use of contemporary views of religion as found in the work of the distinguished Ian Barbour and Arthur Peacocke, keeping instead to a classic Christian theological formulation (i.e., traditional credal Christian orthodoxy), which is a position closer to John Polkinghorne according to McGrath. Also when relating Christianity and science, the three volumes stress the provisionality of scientific understanding, findings, and conclusions. This sort of provisionality makes relating Christianity to science very different from relating Christianity to fairly settled views such as Platonism and Aristotelianism.

== Rationale ==
Commenting that "[w]riting on method is a bit like clearing your throat before beginning a lecture. You can only go on so long before the audience starts to get a little restless." McGrath makes clear that the methodological concerns of A Scientific Theology constitute an extensive preliminary to the development of a systematic theology constructed according to the trilogy's methodological grounds.

A Scientific Theology is intended by McGrath to be ecumenical in approach and valuable to Catholic, Orthodox, Protestant and evangelical readers.

Due to both McGrath's creedal commitments, A Scientific Theology is "a systematic work of theology".

Due precisely to the scope of the work, McGrath felt led to prepare a short volume The Science of God which "is designed to introduce the distinctive themes and emphasis of this scientific theology to a wider readership"

In intent, the trilogy is a very ambitious project which seeks to lay a methodological groundwork for further theological reflection. In execution, McGrath himself acknowledges that it falls somewhat short of its goal. Writing in the conclusion to the third volume he explains;

The process of unfolding what seemed like a bright idea back in 1976 has proved to be far more difficult than I had imagined, and its execution less satisfactory than I had hoped. Initially, it seemed to me that the vast spaciousness offered by these three volumes would be more than adequate to deal with the issues I knew had to be addressed in articulating a coherent and plausible vision of 'a scientific theology'. ... [however] What I had hoped might be extensive discussions of central methodological questions have ended up being rather shallow; what I had hoped to be close readings of seminal texts seem to have turned out to be little more than superficial engagements...I have certainly not achieved real closure on the issues which it aimed to address.

== Other Works of Relevance to the Scientific Theology Project ==
The three volumes of A Scientific Theology form part of a broader project which has issued in a number of other books by McGrath. The contents of these books, and their relation to the scientific theology project, are briefly described in this section.

=== The Science of God (2004) ===
The Science of God is a small book prepared by McGrath to introduce the themes and emphases of A Scientific Theology to a wider readership. Four considerations guided its preparation;

1. Level: is less academic, assuming less about the reader's background knowledge in science, theology and philosophy.
2. Style: is popular rather than scholarly, with new sections prepared with a different audience in mind.
3. Length: is greatly reduced with many scholarly footnotes and extended discussions omitted.
4. Case Studies: in historical science and theology are no longer discussed in detail. Rather they are briefly noted and their relevance explained.

Fleming, noting the impact of McGrath's project, describes The Science of God as "an accessible place to begin following what is likely to become one of the most influential areas in the science-religion dialogue".

== Reviews and criticism ==
Reviews of this work have appeared in The Journal of Religion, Journal of the American Academy of Religion, and Isis amongst others.

=== Volume 1: Nature ===
First edition (publ. William B. Eerdmans, 2001)

Willem B. Drees, Leiden University, The Netherlands, offered a lengthy review of Volume 1: Nature in which he followed a summary of the work with a solid critique. There are three points at which Drees critiques McGrath throughout the review;

- Theological Commitments: Drees is critical of McGrath's focus on Christianity specifically rather than religion generally because although “defining religion(s) may be highly difficult...such difficulties are no excuse to dismiss the challenge of alternative worldviews or ways of being in the world.” Here, McGrath's ‘Christian Orthodox’ theological orientation is seen as too narrow - it “works well for those who stand within a particular tradition” but it “communicates less convincingly with outsiders, or the potential outsider within the churches” - as well as somewhat artificial - is it “sufficiently coherent to count as a well defined position?” Furthermore, Drees suggests, McGrath's orthodoxy “covers up tensions” between Evangelical and Roman Catholic approaches in particular. McGrath's critique (and hence rejection) of the “transient” theologies of an earlier generation is turned back upon McGrath's own conservative position which “might be transient as well; “whatever it is, transience is not an argument.” McGrath's appeal to ‘Scripture’ as normative is judged naïve and “McGrath’s problem awareness with respect to appeals to ‘nature’ is not matched by a similar care in his appeals to Scripture.” Although McGrath allows for dynamic in the ‘reception of doctrine’ this leaves unanswered the question as to which modifications are legitimate and which are not.
- Method vs Content: Given that McGrath's primary interest is avowedly methodological, Drees finds “somewhat surprising” that he offers criticism of those whose interests are primarily in the content of science (e.g. Ian Barbour, Arthur Peacocke) rather than engaging with those contemporary writers who focus primarily on method (e.g. Philip Clayton, Nancey Murphy, Mikael Stenmark, J. Wentzel van Huyssten). The idea that method is unchanging whilst content is highly provisional is criticised. In respects of the content of science Drees suggests that a threefold distinction between the increasingly provisional “consolidated knowledge,” “current research,” and “speculative reaches” of science would be helpful. In respects of the methods of science, Drees rejects a claim of stasis arguing that history shows that “ideas about method have changed as well.” On the content of scientific knowledge Drees remarks that "Even though knowledge is in principle provisional, it seems unlikely that we will ever get rid of a spherical Earth, the Periodic Table, the million year long time scales of biologists and geologists, or the insight that humans are evolutionary close relatives of chimps and bonobo’s. Science is open ended in metaphysics, but consolidated in many substantial domains of knowledge." McGrath's criticism of theologies grounded in the content of the natural sciences” is thus misplaced at two levels. First, grounding theology in science is not, in fact, what others in the field (Peacocke, Barbour) are doing. Second, a theology which avoids all engagement with the consolidated findings of contemporary science risks irrelevance.
- Accuracy of representation of opposing views: McGrath's claim that process theology (under the influence of Barbour) has become almost the “establishment” position is seen as curious given the widespread criticism of process theology by major thinkers associated with major institutions (Oxford, Cambridge, Berkley, the Zygon centre). Drees responds to McGrath's critique of his own work strongly. Noting that he has already offered reply to one of McGrath's primary sources (Griffin, Religion and Scientific Naturalism, 1996), Drees acknowledges certain of McGrath's criticisms in relation to his own “purely naturalistic approach to religion” but objects to McGrath's citation of his claim that “a completely independent justification of naturalism is impossible” without citing the preceding passage which qualifies this remark. Citing further issues with McGrath's engagement with his own work, Drees concludes that “given his theological interest, McGrath is right to disagree with me, but accurate analysis and criticism – of my writings and those of various others – is not the strength of his book.”

Drees concludes; “McGrath’s book is rich in historical detail and in footnotes (I wish they had been covered by the index as well) and very outspoken in its judgments ... [but] I find the book falling short in the accuracy with which it deals with other positions and with complex issues such as the philosophical arguments pro and contra scientific realism...and theological realism.”

Larry L. Rasmussen, Reinhold Niebuhr Emeritus Professor of Social Ethics, Union Theological Seminary, considered A Scientific Theology: Volume 1, Nature to be “immensely learned and instructive.” After giving a brief summary of the volume's themes and contents he concludes that McGrath is "in full command of the English and German language sources within what he calls 'the western intellectual community.'" However, Rasmussen finds “unsettling” McGrath's failure to move outside that community to engage with recent Christian sources – feminist and Two-Thirds World in particular – which in recent decades have challenged both McGrath's streams of theology, and the epistemologies and philosophy of science. Thus, although McGrath sees his project as “a public theology,” Rasmussen considers that this “does not mean engagement with voices that dissent from his canon.” He concludes: “Given the ferment in both theology and science...this is an unfortunate omission in an otherwise learned undertaking.”

Gregory Snyder in the Anglican Theological Review considered Volume 1 "a magisterial historical, philosophical, theological, and biblical treatise on "nature". By its end, I felt as if I had completed a seminary course in natural theology. It is well written, erudite, at times even provocative, and humorous. However, it is not a book for the faint of heart. It is a book to consume slowly and savor in one's study, notepad in hand."
