= Alister McGrath =

Irish Anglican priest, scientist, and academic (born 1953)

The Reverend Alister McGrath FRSA
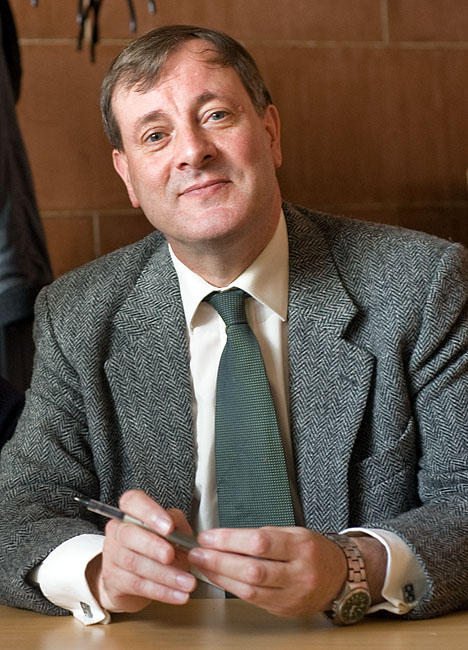
- McGrath in 2008
- Born: Alister Edgar McGrath; 23 January 1953 (age 73); Belfast, Northern Ireland
- Spouse: Joanna Collicutt

Ecclesiastical career
- Religion: Christianity (Anglican)
- Church: Church of England
- Ordained: 1980 (deacon); 1981 (priest)

Academic background
- Education: Wadham College, Oxford; Linacre College, Oxford; Merton College, Oxford; Westcott House, Cambridge
- Doctoral advisor: George Radda
- Influences: Thomas Aquinas; Karl Barth; Roy Bhaskar; C. S. Lewis; Thomas F. Torrance

Academic work
- Discipline: Theology
- School or tradition: Theological critical realism
- Institutions: Wycliffe Hall, Oxford; St Hilda's College, Oxford; King's College, London; Harris Manchester College, Oxford
- Doctoral students: Michael Horton; Frank A. James III; Andrew Ter Ern Loke
- Main interests: Theistic evolution; natural theology; relationship between religion and science
- Influenced: Nicky Gumbel
- Website: alistermcgrath.weebly.com

Alister Edgar McGrath FRSA (/məˈɡræθ/; born 1953) is an Irish theologian, Anglican priest, intellectual historian, scientist, Christian apologist, and public intellectual. He currently holds the Andreas Idreos Professorship in Science and Religion in the Faculty of Theology and Religion, and is a fellow of Harris Manchester College at the University of Oxford. He held the position of Professor of Divinity at Gresham College between 2015 and 2018. He was previously professor of theology, ministry, and education at King's College London and head of the Centre for Theology, Religion and Culture, professor of historical theology at the University of Oxford, and was principal of Wycliffe Hall, Oxford, until 2005.

Aside from being a faculty member at Oxford, McGrath has also taught at Cambridge University and is a teaching fellow at Regent College. McGrath holds three doctorates from the University of Oxford: a doctoral degree in molecular biophysics, a Doctor of Divinity degree in theology, and a Doctor of Letters degree in intellectual history. In addition to his doctorates, he also holds a Bachelor of Arts, a Bachelor of Divinity, a Master of Arts, and three honorary doctorates.

McGrath is noted for his work in historical theology, systematic theology, and the relationship between science and religion, as well as his writings on apologetics. He is also known for his opposition to New Atheism and antireligion and his advocacy of theological critical realism. Among his best-known books are The Twilight of Atheism, The Dawkins Delusion? Dawkins' God: Genes, Memes, and the Meaning of Life, and A Scientific Theology. He is also the author of a number of popular textbooks on theology.

== Biography ==
Alister Edgar McGrath was born on 23 January 1953 in Belfast, Northern Ireland, and grew up in Downpatrick, County Down, where he attended Down High School. In September 1966 he became a pupil at the Methodist College Belfast, where his studies focused on mathematics, physics and chemistry. He went up to Wadham College, Oxford, in 1971 and gained first-class honours Bachelor of Arts (BA) degree in chemistry in 1975. He began research in molecular biophysics in the Oxford University Department of Biochemistry under the supervision of George Radda and was elected to an E.P.A. Cephalosporin Research Studentship at Linacre College, Oxford, for the academic year 1975–1976, and to a Domus Senior Scholarship at Merton College, Oxford, for the period 1976–1978. During these three years, he carried out scientific research while studying for the Oxford University Final Honour School of Theology. He was awarded an Oxford Doctor of Philosophy (DPhil) degree for his research in molecular biophysics (December 1977), and gained first-class honours in theology in June 1978.

Reflecting on his time as an undergraduate at Wadham, McGrath has written, "I was discovering that Christianity was far more intellectually robust than I had ever imagined. I had some major rethinking to do, and by the end of November [1971], my decision was made: I turned my back on one faith and embraced another."

McGrath then left Oxford to work at the University of Cambridge, where he also studied for ordination in the Church of England at Westcott House, Cambridge. In September 1980, he was ordained deacon and began ministry as a curate at St Leonard's Church, Wollaton in the Diocese of Southwell. He was ordained priest at Southwell Minster in September 1981. In 1983, he was appointed lecturer in Christian doctrine and ethics at Wycliffe Hall, Oxford, and a member of the Oxford University's Faculty of Theology. He was additionally chaplain to St Hilda's College, Oxford from 1983 to 1987. He was awarded a postgraduate Bachelor of Divinity (BD) degree by Oxford in 1983, for research in historical theology. He spent the fall semester of 1990 as the Ezra Squire Tipple Visiting Professor of Historical Theology at the Divinity School of Drew University, Madison, New Jersey.

McGrath was appointed university research lecturer in theology at Oxford University in 1993 and also served as research professor of systematic theology at Regent College, Vancouver, from 1993 to 1999. In 1995, he was elected principal of Wycliffe Hall and in 1999, was awarded a personal chair in theology by the University of Oxford with the title Professor of Historical Theology. He was awarded the Oxford degree of Doctor of Divinity (DD) degree in 2001 for his research in historical and systematic theology, and was a founding member of the International Society for Science and Religion. On 1 September 2008 McGrath took up the chair of theology, ministry and education in the Department of Education and Professional Studies at King's College London. In 2009, he delivered the Gifford Lectures on A Fine-Tuned Universe: The Quest for God in Science and Theology at the University of Aberdeen. In 2010 McGrath was included in "The 20 Most Brilliant Christian Professors" list. In 2013 he was awarded his third doctorate from Oxford University, a Doctor of Letters (DLitt) degree, Division of Humanities, for research into science and religion, and natural theology.

In 2014, McGrath returned to the University of Oxford, having been appointed Andreas Idreos Professor of Science and Religion and director of the Ian Ramsey Centre for Science and Religion, and elected fellow of Harris Manchester College, Oxford. From 2015 to 2018, he was additionally the 32nd Professor of Divinity at Gresham College, a position dating back to 1597. In this position he delivered a series of free public lectures on Science, Faith, and God: The Big Questions, in which he aimed to present "a coherent exploration of how Christian theology can engage with concerns and debates within modern culture, focusing on one of its leading elements – the natural sciences." In 2022, he retired as Andreas Idreos Professor in 2022, and was appointed Professor Emeritus of Science and Religion and made an emeritus fellow of Harris Manchester College.

== Views ==
McGrath accepts and promotes evolution. A former atheist, McGrath suggested in The Twilight of Atheism that atheism was in decline. He has been highly critical of Richard Dawkins, calling him "embarrassingly ignorant of Christian theology". His book, The Dawkins Delusion? – a response to Dawkins's The God Delusion – was published by SPCK in February 2007, and the two had public debate on the topic, "Does religious belief damage the health of a society, or is it necessary to provide the moral and ethical foundations of a healthy society?"

McGrath has also debated with Daniel Dennett, at the Greer-Heard Point-Counterpoint Forum in New Orleans in February 2007, as well as Christopher Hitchens at Georgetown University. In March 2007, McGrath debated with Peter Atkins at the University of Edinburgh on the topic 'Darwin and Humanity: Should We Rid the Mind of God?' In November that year, he debated with Susan Blackmore on the existence of God. McGrath has debated with David Helfand at the Veritas Forum on whether belief in God is a delusion. In 2011, he debated with Stephen Law on the topic 'Why Won't God Go Away?' He was interviewed by Richard Dawkins about his book Dawkins' God and faith in general for the television documentary The Root of All Evil? McGrath's interview was not included in the final cut, but the unedited footage is available online.

== Personal life ==
In 1980, he married Joanna Collicutt. She is a psychologist, Anglican priest, and academic specialising in the psychology of religion. Together they have two children.

== Writings ==
The author of more than 50 books, among McGrath's more notable works are:

- Understanding the Trinity, Grand Rapids: Academie Books, 1988, ISBN 0-310-29680-3
- Understanding Doctrine, Grand Rapids: Zondervan Publishing House, 1992, ISBN 0-310-47951-7
- Bridge-Building, Leicester: Inter-Varsity Press, 1992, ISBN 0-85110-969-1
- Intellectuals Don't Need God & Other Modern Myths, Grand Rapids: Zondervan Publishing House, 1993, ISBN 0-310-59091-4
- The Renewal of Anglicanism, Harrisburg: Morehouse, 1993, ISBN 0-8192-1603-8
- A Life of John Calvin (1993) ISBN 0-631-18947-5
- A Passion for Truth: The Intellectual Coherence of Evangelicalism (1996) ISBN 0-8308-1866-9
- Iustitia Dei, Cambridge: Cambridge University Press, 1998, ISBN 0-521-62426-6
- Science and Religion: An Introduction (1998) ISBN 0-631-20842-9
- Historical Theology: An Introduction to the History of Christian Thought (1998) ISBN 0-631-20844-5
- I Believe: Exploring the Apostles' Creed (1998) ISBN 0-8308-1946-0
- T. F. Torrance: An Intellectual Biography (1999) ISBN 0-567-08683-6
- The Journey: A Pilgrim in the Lands of the Spirit (2000) ISBN 978-0-385-49588-2
- Christian Theology: An Introduction (2001) ISBN 0-631-22528-5 (often used as a seminary textbook)
- The Christian Theology Reader (2001) ISBN 0-631-20637-X (containing primary sources referred to in his Christian Theology)
- In the Beginning : The Story of the King James Bible and How It Changed a Nation, a Language, and a Culture (2001) ISBN 0-385-72216-8
- Glimpsing the Face of God: The Search for Meaning in the Universe (2001) ISBN 0-8028-3980-0
- The Reenchantment of Nature: The Denial of Religion and the Ecological Crisis (2002) ISBN 978-0-385-50059-3
- Knowing Christ (2002) ISBN 0-385-50316-4
- A Scientific Theology v. 3 (2003) ISBN 0-567-08349-7
- A Brief History of Heaven (2003) ISBN 0-631-23354-7
- The Intellectual Origins of the European Reformation (2003) ISBN 0-631-22939-6
- The Twilight of Atheism: The Rise and Fall of Disbelief in the Modern World (2004) ISBN 0-385-50061-0
- Christianity's Dangerous Idea: The Protestant Revolution from the Sixteenth to the Twenty-First Century (2007) ISBN 978-0-06-082213-2
- The Dawkins Delusion? Atheist Fundamentalism and the denial of the divine (2007) ISBN 0-281-05927-6 (A critical response to Dawkins' book The God Delusion)
- The Open Secret: A New Vision for Natural Theology (2008) ISBN 978-1-4051-2691-5
- A Fine-Tuned Universe: The Quest for God in Science and Theology (2009) ISBN 0-664-23310-4
- Heresy: A History of Defending the Truth (2009) ISBN 978-0-06-082214-9
- Mere Theology: Christian Faith and the Discipleship of the Mind (2010) ISBN 0-281-06209-9
- Chosen Ones (Series: The Aedyn Chronicles Volume: 1) (2010) ISBN 0-310-71812-0
- Surprised by Meaning: Science, Faith, and How We Make Sense of Things (2011) ISBN 0-664-236-928
- Why God Won't Go Away: Engaging with the New Atheism (2011) ISBN 0-281-06387-7
- Flight of the Outcasts (Series: The Aedyn Chronicles Volume: 2) (2011) ISBN 0-310-71813-9
- Darkness Shall Fall (Series: The Aedyn Chronicles Volume: 3) (2011) ISBN 978-0-310-71814-7
- Reformation Thought: An Introduction (2012) ISBN 0-470-67281-1
- Darwinism and the Divine: Evolutionary Thought and Natural Theology (Oxford: Blackwell-Wiley, 2011). ISBN 9781444333442 The 2009 Hulsean Lectures at the University of Cambridge
- Mere apologetics: how to help seekers and skeptics find faith (Baker Books, 2012) ISBN 978-0-8010-1416-1
- The Intellectual World of C. S. Lewis (2013) ISBN 978-0-470-67279-2
- C. S. Lewis- A Life: Eccentric Genius, Reluctant Prophet (2013)
- Dawkins' God: Genes, Memes, and the Meaning of Life ([2004] 2015), 2nd ed., Wiley. ISBN 1-4051-2538-1 ISBN 0-281-05927-6 ISBN 978-1-4051-2538-3, pbk. (A critique of scientist Richard Dawkins' attitude towards religion)
- The Big Question: Why We Can't Stop Talking About Science, Faith, and God (2015), St. Martin's Press, ISBN 978-1-250-07792-9
- Enriching Our Vision of Reality: Theology and Natural Sciences in Dialogue (2016), Templeton Press, ISBN 978-1-599-47534-9
- The Landscape of Faith: An Explorer's Guide to Christian Creeds (2018), SPCK, ISBN 978-0-281-07625-3
- Mere Discipleship: Growing in Wisdom and Hope (2018), Baker Books, ISBN 978-0-801-09422-4
- Narrative Apologetics: Sharing the Relevance, Joy, and Wonder of the Christian Faith (2019), Baker Books, ISBN 978-0-801-07577-3
- Richard Dawkins, C.S. Lewis and the Meaning of Life (2019), SPCK, ISBN 978-0-281-08019-9
- A Theory of Everything (That Matters): A Brief Guide to Einstein, Relativity, and His Surprising Thoughts on God (2019), Tyndale, ISBN 978-1-4964-3807-2
- J.I. Packer: His Life and Thought (2020), InterVarsity Press, ISBN 978-0-8308-4177-6
- A Cloud of Witnesses: 10 Great Christian Thinkers (2005), Wipf and Stock Publishers, ISBN 978-1-5975-2304-2

Academic offices
Preceded by John Barton	Bampton Lecturer; 1990	Succeeded by Colin Gunton
Preceded by R. T. France	Principal of Wycliffe Hall, Oxford; 1995–2005	Succeeded by Richard Turnbull
Preceded by Peter Harrison	Andreas Idreos Professor of Science and Religion; 2014–present	Incumbent
Preceded by The Lord Plant of Highfield	Gresham Professor of Divinity; 2015–present	Incumbent
