= World Union of Deists =

Religious advocacy organization

- Formation: 1993
- Founder: Bob Johnson
- Headquarters: Virginia
- Website: Official website

The World Union of Deists (WUD) is the largest and oldest organization in the world promoting the natural religion of deism.

== History ==
The World Union of Deists was founded in Charlottesville, Virginia, on April 10, 1993, by Robert Johnson. The WUD is based in the United States with representatives in some thirty countries, produces podcasts, manages an online library, and publishes the journal Deism. The motto is "God Gave Us Reason, Not Religion". The WUD has a bi-monthly publication called Think!

== International members ==
=== Europe ===
- (Europe) European Deist Union
- (Italy) Unione Deista Italiana
- Association Déiste de France
- (Spain) Unión Deísta Española

=== Africa ===
- Deism in Egypt
- Deism Uganda
- Deism Tanzania
- Deism Nigeria

=== America ===
- (Brazil) Deismo Brasil
- Deísmo Colombia

=== Asia ===
- Deism in Jordan
- Deism in Iraq
- (India) Indian Deist
- (Hong Kong) Scientific Humanistic Deism
- (Azerbaijan) Deizm Azərbaycan
- Deism Philippines
