= The Twilight of Atheism =

2004 book by Alister McGrath

The Twilight of Atheism: The Rise and Fall of Disbelief in the Modern World
- Author: Alister McGrath
- Language: English
- Subject: Atheism History
- Publisher: Doubleday
- Publication date: 2004
- Publication place: US
- Media type: Print
- Pages: 306
- ISBN: 0-385-50061-0
- OCLC: 52705976
- Dewey Decimal: 211/.8/09 22
- LC Class: BL2747.3 .M355 2004

The Twilight of Atheism: The Rise and Fall of Disbelief in the Modern World is a book by Christian theologian and apologist Alister McGrath which traces the perceived decline of secular thought over the last two centuries.

McGrath states that the book is an expanded form of a speech he gave at a debate in February 2002 at the Oxford Union.

== Reception ==
- John Gray in The Independent said "The decline of secular thought is the subject of Alister McGrath's provocative and timely The Twilight of Atheism. (...) His aim is not so much to analyse atheism as demolish its intellectual credentials, and in this he is largely successful. (...) At the same time, his zeal as a Christian apologist gives his argument a strident and parochial tone. McGrath's difficulties begin when he tries to define atheism."
- Julian Baggini considers that "A book like Alister McGrath’s The Twilight of Atheism no longer looks perversely contrarian, but a fair reflection of social reality".
- Dan J. Bye in The Freethinker discussed McGrath's treatment of the historical dispute about whether or not Calvin condemned Copernicus. Describing himself as "infuriated by McGrath’s distortions of atheism and its history, and by the generally dreadful quality of the scholarship on display in Twilight of Atheism", Bye comments that "a writer who criticises others for failing to check their facts and their sources needs to take particular care over their own material", yet "I have put just two pages of Twilight of Atheism under the magnifying glass, and revealed more flawed scholarship than I have space to discuss in detail." In a subsequent article, Bye discussed McGrath's use of recycled material in Twilight.
- Jane Leapmann in the Christian Science Monitor commented that: "Time magazine spurred public debate 40 years ago with a startling question on its cover: "Is God Dead?" Some estimate that half the world's population was then nominally atheist. And many in the West were predicting that scientific progress would eliminate religious belief altogether by the next century...In this accessible intellectual history, McGrath explores how atheism came to capture a wide swath of the public imagination as the road to human liberation and progress, and why, in a postmodern world, its appeal has faded. Yet he also makes clear that, despite the resurgence in faith, Western Christianity has not fully recovered from the crisis of the '60s."
- Claire Berlinski in the Hoover Institution's Policy Review suggests that "one wishes McGrath had made his case with greater precision and care. He offers scant sociological data and few statistics about rates of religious belief over this period." She doubts whether "post-modernism will provide a nurturing climate for theists.... If he is still prepared to make this case after a weekend spent sharing the Good News at the annual Modern Language Association Convention, I am prepared to listen." She comments that "The object of his historic inquiry is not atheism per se but one particular and influential strand of it: a conjunction of so-called hard atheism — the explicit denial of the existence of God, as opposed to mere lack of belief — with a series of beliefs that exceed any ontological claims about God to encompass moral and political arguments for the eradication of theism. Only this species of atheism, thus defined, is by his reckoning cast in twilight. As a limited case it is somewhat successful — who can dispute that atheist regimes failed to cover themselves in glory, or that strident atheists are a particularly unattractive bunch? ... But McGrath defines atheism so narrowly that the most interesting questions are unaddressed and unresolved, and his ebullient conclusions are unsupported by the arguments."
- Ben Rogers in the Financial Times concluded that "It strikes me as a little alarming that the Professor of Historical Theology at Oxford University could write such a careless, tendentious, almost unscrupulous book. I hope he is not representative of the state of academic theology at large."
- Tim O'Neil writes: "But throughout his history McGrath offers more puzzling elisions and leaps of logic. The most serious is his insistence on discussing atheism as a`"faith", treating it in the context of history like just another of many competing spiritual enterprises. He is correct in assuming that the claim is "astonishing" to many atheists, because despite his philosophical maneuverings he simply fails to make the argument anything less than an oxymoron. (..) Believing in God or any supernatural agency therefore requires that the believer make an external assumption. To say that the act of not believing in God is similarly an article of faith is to misread the question entirely, to presuppose that an awareness of divinity is in fact the default position for human intellect to take — quite a leap, but McGrath isn’t the only one to make it (..) In conflating the concepts of atheism and the conventional understanding of "faith", McGrath also makes another crucial error — mistaking atheism, an idea, with atheism as a mass movement. (..) The fact that Stalin just happened to be an atheist has no impact on the legitimacy of the idea anymore than the fact that Torquemada just happened to be a Christian impacts the legitimacy of Christianity".
- The National Review wrote, "McGrath is an engaging, anecdote loving writer with irenic sympathy for all his subjects, even the atheists, whose classic critique of Christianity as intolerant and corruption-prone he believes has spurred the churches to reform themselves in positive ways. I found him a shade too irenic. McGrath properly celebrates the passing of secular modernity but goes on to give too much credit to the postmodernist theorists who helped push modernity over the edge. He seems to forget that Jacques Derrida, Michel Foucault, and their epigones are also militant atheists, with all the intolerance and totalitarian tendencies of that breed, and that academic postmodernism rests upon a Marxist substrate as surely as did Stalinism. Even more distressing is the scant attention that McGrath pays to the highly credentialed and supremely self-confident Richard Dawkinses of the world. Science and religion need not be in conflict, but it remains the case (as McGrath himself notes) that atheistic scientific materialism is the religion of a strong plurality, perhaps the majority, of the world's scientists. They want to be known not as atheists but as "brights," smarter than and superior to the rest of us. The claims of such scientists—that their own interests and desires as the unacknowledged legislators of the world should prevail without restraint—are currently being played out in the political debate over government funding for embryonic stem cell research. I wish that McGrath had entertained the possibility that atheism, while undoubtedly in philosophical and demographic twilight, may yet be experiencing a new dawn: a terrifying new alliance with money and power, of a kind even Marx could not have foreseen."

== See also ==
Contribution in digital version
