= Dawkins' God =

2004 book by Alister McGrath

- Author: Alister McGrath
- Language: English
- Subject: Relationship between religion and science
- Genre: Science
- Publisher: John Wiley & Sons
- Publication date: 2004; 2015
- Publication place: United Kingdom
- ISBN: 978-1-4051-2538-3
- Dewey Decimal: 261.5/5 22
- LC Class: BT1103 .M34 2005

Dawkins' God: Genes, Memes, and the Meaning of Life is a book by Alister McGrath, a theologian who is currently Professor of Historical Theology at Oxford University. The book, published in 2004, with a second edition in 2015, aims to refute claims about religion made by another well-known professor at Oxford, Richard Dawkins. McGrath's book does not seek to demonstrate how Dawkins’ claims differ from Christianity, rather, it argues that Dawkins' arguments fall far short of the logical and evidence-based reasoning that Dawkins himself espouses.

== Synopsis ==
McGrath begins with an overview of evolutionary biology and Darwinian theory. He then presents Dawkins' view that the current state of scientific knowledge should lead a rational person to conclude that there is no God. McGrath argues that Dawkins fails to declare or defend several crucial assumptions or premises. McGrath also defends other conclusions in the book, including:

- the scientific method cannot conclusively prove that God does or does not exist;
- the theory of evolution does not necessarily entail any particular atheistic, agnostic, or Christian understanding of the world;
- Dawkins' refutation of William Paley's watchmaker analogy does not equate to a refutation of God’s existence;
- Dawkins' proposal that memes explain the evolutionary development of human culture is more illogical and unscientific than a clearly articulated defence of Christianity;
- Dawkins is ignorant of Christian theology and mischaracterizes religious people in general.

McGrath argues that Dawkins' rejection of faith is a straw man argument. According to McGrath, Dawkins’ definition that faith “means blind trust, in the absence of evidence” is not a Christian position. In contrast, argues McGrath, accepting Dawkins’ definition would require blind trust since he offers no evidence to support it. Rather, it is based upon what McGrath calls “an unstated and largely unexamined cluster of hidden non-scientific values and beliefs” (p. 92). McGrath then argues that Dawkins frequently violates the very tenets of evidence-based reasoning that Dawkins himself claims to uphold and use to dismiss all religious belief.

Also on page 92, McGrath states "... Darwinism neither proves nor disproves the existence of God (unless, of course God is defined by his critics in precisely such a way...)."

== Reception ==
In Science the sceptic Michael Shermer, reviewing this book, says

[McGrath's] defense of religious faith is a passionate and honorable one and he demonstrates that some of Dawkins's characterizations of religion are indeed overly simplistic or selective, but he never delivers an answer to the God question. The closest thing to an argument for God's existence I could find in the book is this: "Why should God require an explanation at all? He might just be an 'ultimate,'...one of those things we have to accept as given and is thus amenable to description, rather than explanation." That may be, but like all other arguments made in favor of God's existence, this only works as a reason to believe if you already believe. If you do not already believe, science cannot help you.

== Response from Dawkins ==
In response to the book in general, and to the accusation of being ignorant of Christian theology in particular, Richard Dawkins stated:

Yes, I have, of course, met this point before. It sounds superficially fair. But it presupposes that there is something in Christian theology to be ignorant about. The entire thrust of my position is that Christian theology is a non-subject. It is empty. Vacuous. Devoid of coherence or content. I imagine that McGrath would join me in expressing disbelief in fairies, astrology and Thor's hammer. How would he respond if a fairyologist, astrologer or Viking accused him of ignorance of their respective subjects?
