= Undergraduate education at the University of Oxford =

The undergraduate education at the University of Oxford in England involves weekly tutorials at the colleges and halls, supported by classes, lectures and laboratory work provided by university faculties and departments.

== Admission ==
Historically, it was common for boys to become members of the university between the ages of 14 and 19. Today, as at other UK universities, the majority of students commence undergraduate courses aged 18, though 17 or 19 is common. However, there are no limits on the age of those admitted (except for at Harris Manchester College which caters only for students aged 21 or over). Much younger people are still occasionally given places if they are of the required standard, for example Ruth Lawrence matriculated aged 12 in 1983.

In common with most British universities, prospective students apply through the UCAS application system; but, prospective applicants for the University of Oxford, along with those for medicine, dentistry, and University of Cambridge applicants, must observe an earlier deadline of 15 October.

To allow a more personalised judgement of students, who might otherwise apply for both, undergraduate applicants are not permitted to apply to both Oxford and Cambridge in the same year. The only exceptions are applicants for Organ Scholarships and those applying to read for a second undergraduate degree.

Students from all backgrounds are encouraged to apply, with "contextual data" (factors that may have influenced prior exam performance) taken into account during the admission procedure. The university believes that there are many potential students from less well-off backgrounds whom the university cannot admit simply because they do not apply.

Most applicants choose to apply to one of the individual colleges, which work with each other to ensure that the best students gain a place somewhere at the University regardless of their college preferences. Shortlisting is based on achieved and predicted exam results; school references; and, in some subjects, written admission tests or candidate-submitted written work. Approximately 60% of applicants are shortlisted, although this varies by subject. If a large number of shortlisted applicants for a subject choose one college, then students who named that college may be reallocated randomly to under-subscribed colleges for the subject. The colleges then invite shortlisted candidates for interview, where they are provided with food and accommodation for around three days in December. Most applicants will be individually interviewed by academics at more than one college. Students from outside Europe can be interviewed remotely, for example, over the Internet.

In 2007, the colleges, faculties and departments published a "common framework" outlining the principles and procedures they observe.

Offers are sent out in early-mid January, with an offer usually being from a specific college. One in four successful candidates receive offers from a college that they did not apply to. Some courses may make "open offers" to some candidates, who are not assigned to a particular college until A Level results day in August.

== Access ==
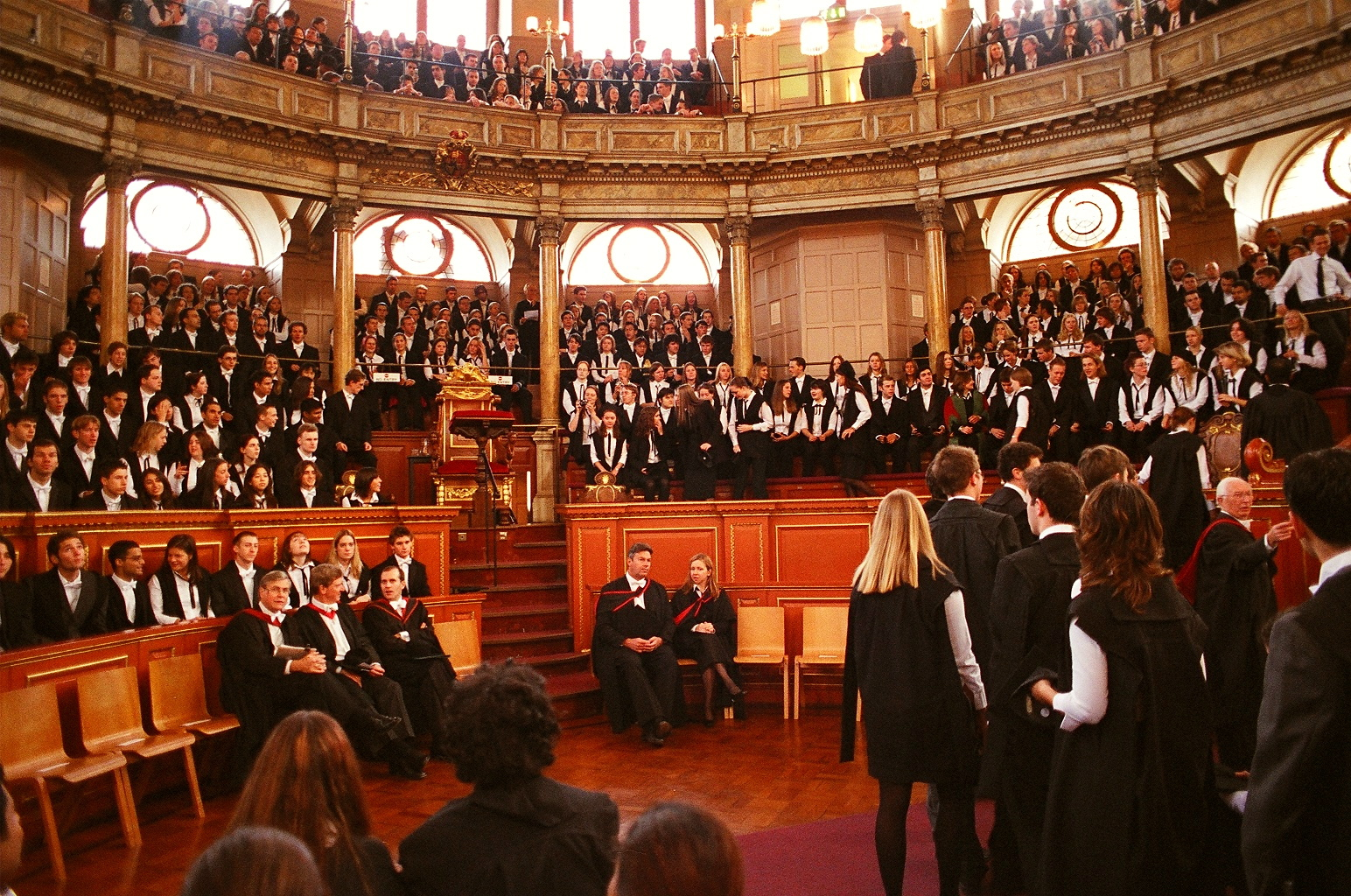
The matriculation ceremony, at which new students officially become members of the university, takes place in Michaelmas Term.

The University states that its admissions policies avoid bias against candidates of certain socioeconomic or educational backgrounds. However, the fairness of Oxford admissions has attracted public controversy through episodes such as the Laura Spence Affair in 2000. Gaining places at Oxford and Cambridge remains a central focus for many private and selective state schools — much more so than most state schools — and the fact that the social make-up of undergraduates at the university differs substantially from the social make-up of society at large remains controversial.

In 2007, the university refined its admissions procedure to take into account the academic performance of its applicants' schools.

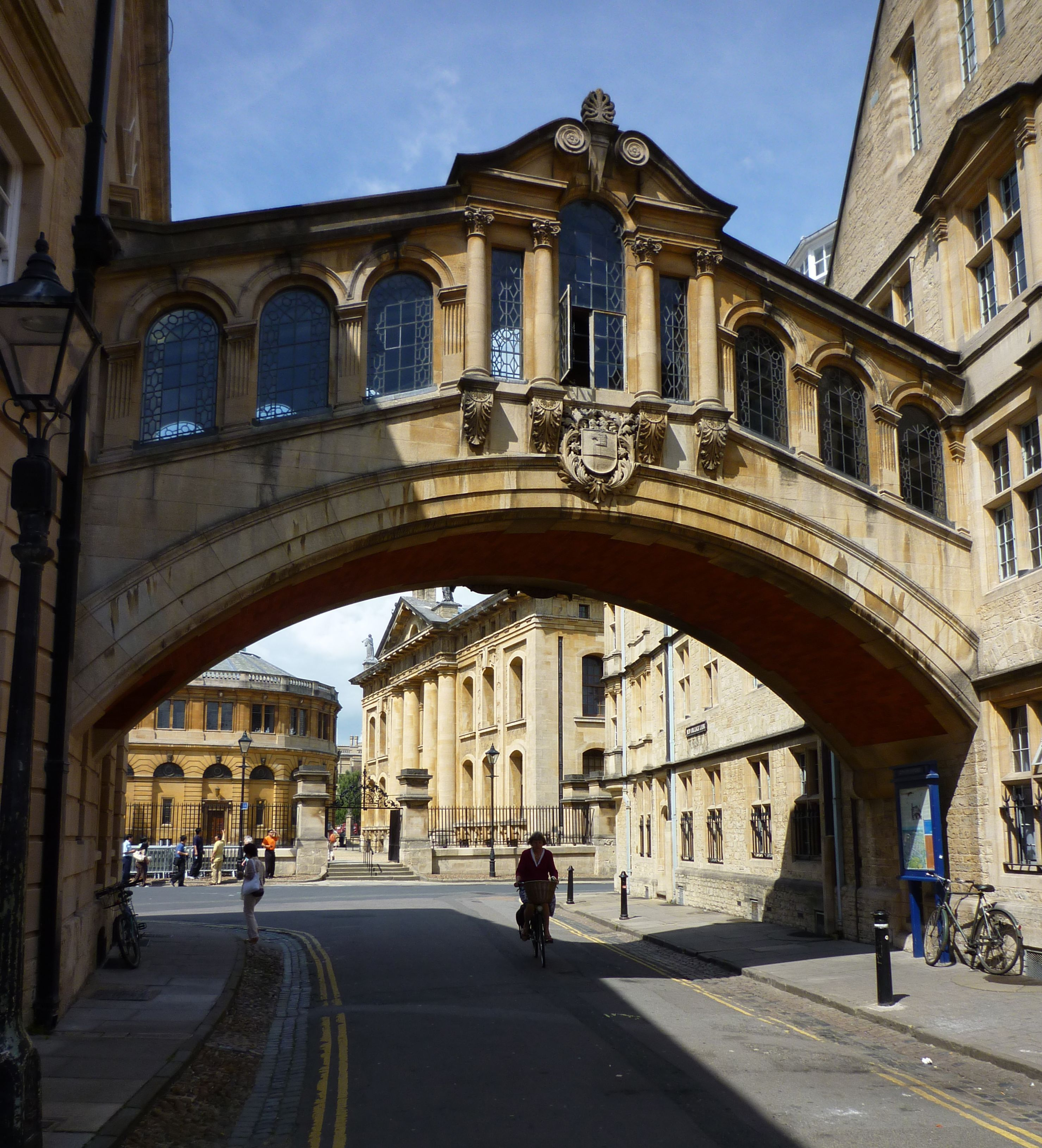
Hertford College's Bridge of Sighs. Hertford was one of the first colleges to encourage applicants from state schools through the Hertford Scheme.

Students who apply from state schools and colleges have an acceptance rate broadly comparable to those from independent schools (19% and 24% of applicants accepted respectively, 2010). More than half of applications come from the state sector, and the University of Oxford funds many initiatives to attract applicants from this sector, including the UNIQ Summer Schools, Oxford Young Ambassadors, Target Schools, and the FE Access Initiative. Regarding the UNIQ Summer School, of all the UNIQ students who went on to make applications in autumn 2010 to enter the university in 2011/12, 39 per cent ended up with places. The overall success rate for Oxford applicants is around 20 per cent. Most colleges also run their own access schemes and initiatives.

The Oxford Admissions Study was a research project set up to investigate access issues, in which data were collected on 2,000 students who applied to the university in 2002, including exam results from the universities they went on to attend. A number of reports were published based on these data. It was found that, if anything, admissions tutors treat applicants from state schools more favourably than applicants from private schools with the same attainment. The research also suggested that this discounting was justified as private school students need higher grades at entry to do as well as their state school educated peers in final university examinations. It was found that cultural knowledge beyond the school curriculum, linked highly to reading habits, was a good indicator for whether arts subjects would gain a place. Contrastingly, participation in cultural activities such as visiting museums, art galleries, classical concerts, and ballet made no difference.

Veiled accusations of racism regarding the 2009 intake were dismissed on the grounds that ethnic minority applicants apply disproportionately more to the most competitive courses, and that black candidates had lower A-level scores nationally. However, further analysis of entrance figures for 2010 and 2011 by The Guardian reported what was termed an "institutional bias" in favour of white candidates; ethnic minority candidates had significantly lower success rates in individual subjects even when they had the same grades as white candidates. In medicine, for instance, ethnic minority applicants who went on to score three A* grades at A level were almost half as likely to gain admission as white applicants with similar grades.

== Teaching and learning ==
Undergraduate teaching is centred on the tutorial, where 1–4 students spend an hour with an academic discussing their week’s work, usually an essay (humanities, most social sciences, some mathematical, physical, and life sciences) or problem sheet (most mathematical, physical, and life sciences, and some social sciences). Students usually have one or two tutorials a week, and can be taught by academics at any other college—not just their own—as expertise and personnel require. These tutorials are complemented by lectures, classes and seminars, which are organised on a departmental basis. Graduate students undertaking taught degrees are usually instructed through classes and seminars, though there is more focus upon individual research.

The university itself is responsible for conducting examinations and conferring degrees. The passing of two sets of examinations is a prerequisite for a first degree. The first set of examinations, called either Honour Moderations ("Mods" and "Honour Mods") or Preliminary Examinations ("Prelims"), are usually held at the end of the first year (after two terms for those studying Law; Theology; Philosophy and Theology; Experimental Psychology; or Psychology, Philosophy and Physiology or after five terms in the case of Classics). The second set of examinations, the Final Honour School ("Finals"), is held at the end of the undergraduate course (for humanities and most social sciences) or at the end of each successive year of the course after the first (most mathematical, physical and life sciences, and some social sciences). Successful candidates receive first-, upper or lower second-, or third-class honours, or simply a "pass" without honours, based on their performance in Finals. An upper second is the most usual result, and a first is often prerequisite for graduate study. A "double first" reflects first-class results in both Honour Moderations and Finals.

As a matter of tradition, bachelor's degree graduates are eligible, after seven years from matriculation (formal induction of students into the university) and without additional study, to purchase for a nominal fee an upgrade of their bachelor's degree to an "MA" or Master of Arts. All MAs were members of Convocation; and, until 1913, all resident members of Convocation were members of Congregation. MAs, as members of Convocation, elected the Chancellor and Professor of Poetry, but recently Convocation has been widened to consist of all graduates.

Undergraduate teaching takes place during three eight week terms: Michaelmas Term, Hilary Term and Trinity Term. (These are officially known as 'Full Term', 'Term' is a lengthier period with little practical significance.) Internally, the weeks in a term begin on Sundays, and are referred to numerically, with the initial week known as "first week", the last as "eighth week" and with the numbering extended to refer to weeks before and after term (for example "-1st week" and "0th week" precede term). Undergraduates must be in residence from Thursday of 0th week. These teaching terms are shorter than those of most other British universities, and their total duration amounts to less than half the year. However, undergraduates are also expected to do some academic work during the three holidays (known as the Christmas, Easter, and Long Vacations).
