= The Root of All Evil? =

2006 documentary film directed by Richard Dawkins

- Written by: Richard Dawkins
- Starring: Richard Dawkins; Yousef al-Khattab; Ted Haggard; Richard Harries

Production
- Producer: Alan Clements
- Running time: 90 minutes

Original release
- Network: Channel 4
- Release: January 2006

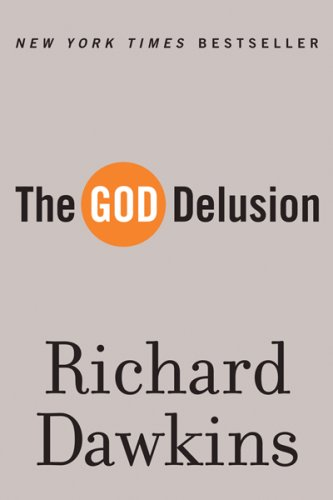
In 2006, after his documentary The Root of All Evil?, Richard Dawkins published his book The God Delusion.

The Root of All Evil?, later retitled The God Delusion, is a television documentary written and presented by Richard Dawkins in which he argues that humanity would be better off without religion or belief in God.

The documentary was first broadcast in January 2006, in the form of two 45-minute episodes (excluding advertisement breaks), on Channel 4 in the United Kingdom. Dawkins did not think The Root of All Evil? was an ideal title. His book The God Delusion, published in September 2006, explores topics from the documentary in more detail.

== The God Delusion ==
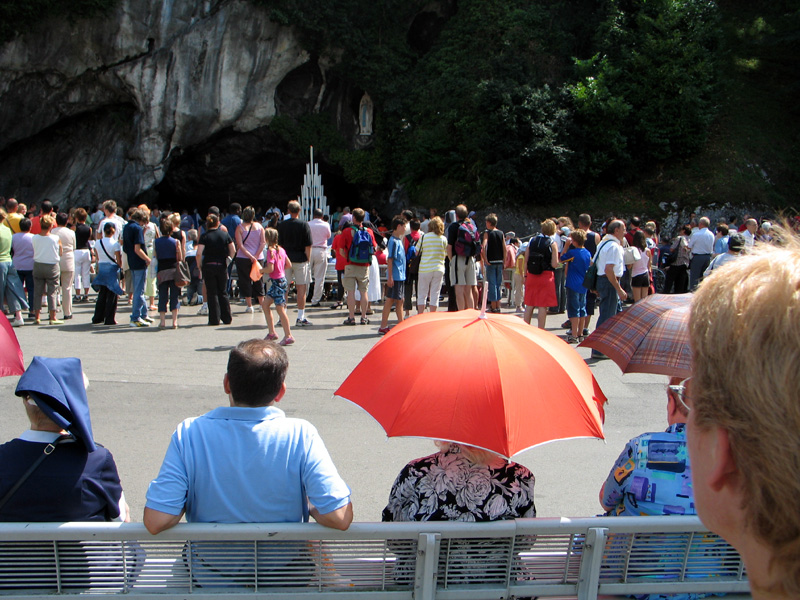
Pilgrims at Lourdes, a place Dawkins visits in the documentary

The God Delusion explored the unproven traditions that are given as fact by religious faiths, and the extremes that some followers take them. Dawkins argues that faith is not a way of understanding the world (described as "non-thought"), and he asserts that it is opposed to modern science which tests hypotheses and builds theories to describe the world. Dawkins visits the United States to interview pastor Ted Haggard, president of the National Association of Evangelicals, and to Jerusalem to interview Yousef al-Khattab (Joseph Cohen), an American born Jew who settled in Israel before converting to Islam. Responding to charges that scientific understanding does not entitle one to reject religion, Dawkins describes Bertrand Russell's celestial teapot thought experiment.

== The Virus Of Faith ==
In The Virus Of Faith Dawkins made a more emotional appeal. The programme examined the moral framework that religions are often cited as providing, and argued against the indoctrination of children. The title of the programme comes from Dawkins' 1976 book The Selfish Gene in which Dawkins introduced the idea of the meme. DNA travels from parents to offspring in genes, but some DNA in the form of viruses can also pass between any individuals.

Dawkins compares religious faith to a virus, being passed from parents to offspring and teachers to pupils. Dawkins visits a London Hasidic Jewish school, in which students are largely isolated from outside ideas. Also in London, Dawkins visits Phoenix Academy, one of the semi-independent city academies introduced by Tony Blair's government, which follows the American Accelerated Christian Learning curriculum. Dawkins finds the pupils rote learning biblical stories, which are integrated into various academic subjects. Dawkins interviews the head teacher of the school, asking why the science curriculum includes Noah's Ark and describes AIDS as the "wages of sin". When the teacher states that without God or a law-giver people will tend to do bad things, Dawkins takes this as a cue to explore the differences between secular ethics and morality based on religious law.

Returning to the United States Dawkins visits the Hell-House Outreach Programme, an organisation that uses hell for "moral policing", producing videos aimed at twelve-year-olds. He also interviews Michael Bray, a friend of Paul Jennings Hill who was sentenced to death for murdering a doctor who performed abortions. Dawkins takes Bray's belief that the Bible sanctions capital punishment for adultery as a cue to discuss his views that the Bible, especially the Old Testament, clashes with modern secular ethics. Quoting from the Old Testament, Dawkins describes its God as "the most unpleasant character in all fiction," and expresses similar disregard for the New Testament's "sadomasochistic doctrine of atonement for original sin."

Dawkins interviews Richard Harries, the Bishop of Oxford, a liberal Anglican, about why Harries accepts some of the Bible while rejecting others, including many of its moral teachings. Harries states that it is possible to be intellectually fulfilled as both a rationalist and religious person.

Finally Dawkins discusses some of the ideas about morality from evolutionary biology, such as reciprocal altruism and kin selection.

== Production ==
Dawkins has said that the title The Root of All Evil? was not his preferred choice, but that Channel 4 had insisted on it to create controversy. The sole concession from the producers on the title was the addition of the question mark. Dawkins has stated that the notion of anything being the root of all evil is ridiculous. Dawkins' book The God Delusion, released in September 2006, goes on to examine the topics raised in the documentary in greater detail. The documentary was rebroadcast on the More4 channel on 25 August 2010 under the title of The God Delusion.

== Critical reception ==
Writing in the New Statesman, Dawkins stated that Channel 4's correspondence in response to the documentary had been running at two to one in favour. Journalists including Howard Jacobson had accused Dawkins of giving voice to extremists, a claim Dawkins responded to by noting that the National Association of Evangelicals has some 30 million members, and also that he had invited the main UK religious leaders to participate, but they all declined. However, Alister McGrath, a Professor of Historical Theology at Oxford University, was interviewed for the program, but was not included in the documentary. McGrath claimed to have made Dawkins "appear uncomfortable" with his explanations of religious belief and the implication, made by McGrath, was that Dawkins's program showed journalistic dishonesty. In a lecture at City Church of San Francisco McGrath said that his interview was cut because he said things that did not promote the message that Dawkins and the producers wanted to get across. The McGrath interview, together with other interviews not shown in the program "The Root of All Evil?", was released in the DVD "Root of All Evil? The Uncut Interviews".

The religious journalist Madeleine Bunting produced a scathing review for The Guardian, in which she described the documentary as "a piece of intellectually lazy polemic not worthy of a great scientist". In The Tablet, Keith Ward criticised Dawkins for what he considered to be an indiscriminate and simplistic approach to religion. Professor Keith Ward's book Is Religion Dangerous?, responding to the Dawkins programme, analyzes the claim that religion does more harm than good and suggests that "such assertions ... ignore the available evidence... and substitute rhetoric for analysis".

Charlie Brooker writes for The Guardian that Dawkins' "central point [...] seems pretty valid from where I'm standing" but that Dawkins "quickly becomes far too angry to conduct a civil conversation" in interviews with religious people and this "doesn't exactly move the debate forward".

== See also ==
- Antireligion
- Antitheism
- Criticism of religion
