= The God Delusion =

2006 book by Richard Dawkins

- First edition UK cover
- Author: Richard Dawkins
- Language: English
- Subjects: Criticism of religion; atheism
- Publisher: Bantam Press
- Publication date: 2 October 2006
- Publication place: United Kingdom
- Media type: Print (hardcover and paperback)
- Pages: 464
- ISBN: 978-0-618-68000-9
- Dewey Decimal: 211/.8 22
- LC Class: BL2775.3 .D39 2006

The God Delusion is a 2006 book by British evolutionary biologist and ethologist Richard Dawkins, in which he argues that a supernatural creator, God, does not exist, and that belief in a personal god qualifies as a delusion, which he defines as a persistent false belief held in the face of strong contradictory evidence. In the book, he expresses his agreement to Robert Pirsig's statement in Lila (1991) that "when one person suffers from a delusion it is called insanity. When many people suffer from a delusion it is called religion." He argues in favour of the possibility of morality existing independently of religion and proposes alternative explanations for the origins of both religion and morality.

In early December 2006, it reached number four in the New York Times Hardcover Non-Fiction Best Seller list after nine weeks on the list. The book has attracted widespread commentary and critical reception, with many works written in response.

== Background ==
Dawkins has presented arguments against creationist explanations of life in his previous works on evolution. The theme of The Blind Watchmaker, published in 1986, is that evolution can explain the apparent design in nature. In The God Delusion he focuses directly on a wider range of arguments used for and against belief in the existence of a god (or gods).

Dawkins identifies himself repeatedly as an atheist, while also pointing out that, in a sense, he is also agnostic, though "only to the extent that I am agnostic about fairies at the bottom of the garden".

Dawkins had long wanted to write a book openly criticising religion, but his publisher had advised against it. By 2006, his publisher had warmed to the idea. Dawkins attributes this change of mind to "four years of Bush" (who "literally said that God had told him to invade Iraq"). By that time, a number of authors, including Sam Harris and Christopher Hitchens, who together with Dawkins were labelled "The Unholy Trinity" by Robert Weitzel, had already written books openly attacking religion. According to the Amazon retailer in August 2007, the book was the best-seller in their sales of books on religion and spirituality, with Hitchens's God is Not Great: How Religion Poisons Everything coming second. This led to a 50% growth in that category over the three years to that date.

== Synopsis ==
Dawkins dedicates the book to Douglas Adams and quotes the novelist: "Isn't it enough to see that a garden is beautiful without having to believe that there are fairies at the bottom of it too?" The book contains ten chapters. The first few chapters make a case that there almost certainly is no God, while the rest discuss religion and morality.

Dawkins writes that The God Delusion contains four what he calls "consciousness-raising" messages, arguing that:

1. Atheists can be happy, balanced, moral, and intellectually fulfilled.
2. Natural selection and similar scientific theories are superior to a "God hypothesis"—the illusion of intelligent design—in explaining the living world and the cosmos.
3. Children should not be labelled by their parents' religion. Terms like "Catholic child" or "Muslim child" should make people cringe.
4. Atheists should be proud, not apologetic, because atheism is evidence of a healthy, independent mind.

=== "God hypothesis" ===
Chapter one, "A deeply religious non-believer", seeks to clarify the difference between what Dawkins terms "Einsteinian religion" and "supernatural religion". He notes that the former includes quasi-mystical and pantheistic references to God in the work of physicists like Albert Einstein and Stephen Hawking, and describes such pantheism as "sexed up atheism". Dawkins instead takes issue with the theism present in religions like Christianity, Islam, and Hinduism. The proposed existence of this interventionist God, which Dawkins calls the "God Hypothesis", becomes an important theme in the book. He maintains that the existence or non-existence of God is a scientific fact about the universe, which is discoverable in principle if not in practice.

The book argues against the Five Ways. According to Dawkins, "[t]he five 'proofs' asserted by Thomas Aquinas in the thirteenth century don't prove anything, and are easily [...] exposed as vacuous."

Dawkins summarises the main philosophical arguments on God's existence, singling out the argument from design for longer consideration. Dawkins concludes that evolution by natural selection can explain apparent design in nature.

He writes that one of the greatest challenges to the human intellect has been to explain "how the complex, improbable design in the universe arises", and suggests that there are two competing explanations:

1. A hypothesis involving a designer, that is, a complex being to account for the complexity that we see.
2. A hypothesis, with supporting theories, that explains how, from simple origins and principles, something more complex can emerge.

This is the basic set-up of his argument against the existence of God, the Ultimate Boeing 747 gambit, where he argues that the first attempt is self-refuting, and the second approach is the way forward.

At the end of chapter 4 ("Why there almost certainly is no God"), Dawkins sums up his argument and states, "The temptation [to attribute the appearance of design to actual design itself] is a false one, because the designer hypothesis immediately raises the larger problem of who designed the designer. The whole problem we started out with was the problem of explaining statistical improbability. It is obviously no solution to postulate something even more improbable". In addition, chapter 4 asserts that the alternative to the designer hypothesis is not chance, but natural selection.

He dedicates a chapter of his book to criticism of the God-of-the-gaps argument. He noted that:

Creationists eagerly seek a gap in present-day knowledge or understanding. If an apparent gap is found, it is assumed that God, by default, must fill it. What worries thoughtful theologians such as Bonhoeffer is that gaps shrink as science advances, and God is threatened with eventually having nothing to do and nowhere to hide.

Dawkins states he cannot disprove God's existence with absolute certainty. However, he applies Occam's razor to argue that a godless universe requires fewer assumptions than one with an omniscient and omnipotent deity, which he contends would represent an extremely complex explanation. He further asserts that omniscience and omnipotence are logically incompatible attributes. Based on these arguments, Dawkins concludes that a universe without God presents a more plausible explanation.

=== Religion and morality ===
The second half of the book begins by exploring the roots of religion and seeking an explanation for its ubiquity across human cultures. Dawkins advocates the "theory of religion as an accidental by-product – a misfiring of something useful" as for example the mind's employment of intentional stance. He proposes that religions spread through cultural transmission, comparing them to memes (a concept he likens to viruses).

He then turns to the subject of morality, maintaining that society does not need religion to be good. Instead, society's morality has a Darwinian explanation: altruistic genes, selected through the process of evolution, give people natural empathy. He asks, "would you commit murder, rape or robbery if you knew that no God existed?" He argues that very few people would answer "yes", undermining the claim that religion is needed to make society behave morally. In support of this view, he surveys the history of morality, arguing that there is a moral Zeitgeist that continually evolves in society, generally progressing toward liberalism. As it progresses, this moral consensus influences how religious leaders interpret their holy writings. Thus, Dawkins argues that morality does not originate from the Bible. He proposes that society's moral progress informs what parts of the Bible Christians accept and what they now dismiss.

=== Other themes ===
In The God Delusion, Dawkins not only defends atheism, but also goes on the offensive against religion. Dawkins criticizes religion for what he describes as its subversion of science, fostering of fanaticism, encouragement of bigotry against homosexuals, and other negative influences. Dawkins regards religion as a "divisive force" and as a "label for in-group/out-group enmity and vendetta".

He is opposed to the teaching of religion in schools, which he considers to be an indoctrination process. He likens the religious teaching of children by parents and teachers in faith schools to what he perceives as mental abuse. Dawkins considers the labels "Muslim child" and "Catholic child" equally misapplied as the descriptions "Marxist child" and "Tory child", as he wonders how a young child can be considered developed enough to have such independent views on the cosmos and humanity's place within it.

The book concludes with the question of whether religion, despite its alleged problems, fills a "much needed gap", giving consolation and inspiration to people who need it. Dawkins argues these needs are much better filled by non-religious means such as philosophy and science and asserts that atheism offers a more life-affirming perspective than religion. An appendix gives addresses for those "needing support in escaping religion".

== Critical reception ==
The book was nominated for Best Book at the British Book Awards, where Richard Dawkins was named Author of the Year. Nevertheless, the book received mixed reviews from critics, including both religious and atheist commentators. In the London Review of Books, Terry Eagleton accused Richard Dawkins of not doing proper research into the topic of his work, religion, and further agreed with critics who accused Dawkins of committing straw man fallacies against theists.

Oxford theologian Alister McGrath (author of The Dawkins Delusion? and Dawkins' God) argues that Dawkins is ignorant of Christian theology, and therefore unable to engage religion and faith intelligently. Dawkins had an extended debate with McGrath at the 2007 Sunday Times Literary Festival.

In Why there almost certainly is a God: Doubting Dawkins, philosopher Keith Ward claims that Dawkins mis-stated the five ways, and thus responds with a straw man. For example, for the fifth Way, Dawkins places it in the same position for his criticism as the Watchmaker analogy- when in fact, according to Ward, they are vastly different arguments. Ward defended the utility of the five ways (for instance, on the fourth argument he states that all possible smells must pre-exist in the mind of God, but that God, being by his nature non-physical, does not himself stink) whilst pointing out that they only constitute a proof of God if one first begins with a proposition that the universe can be rationally understood. Nevertheless, he argues that they are useful in allowing us to understand what God will be like given this initial presupposition.

Eastern Orthodox theologian David Bentley Hart says that Dawkins "devoted several pages of The God Delusion to a discussion of the 'Five Ways' of Thomas Aquinas but never thought to avail himself of the services of some scholar of ancient and mediaeval thought who might have explained them to him ... As a result, he not only mistook the Five Ways for Thomas's comprehensive statement on why we should believe in God, which they most definitely are not, but ended up completely misrepresenting the logic of every single one of them, and at the most basic levels."

Christian philosopher Keith Ward, in his 2006 book Is Religion Dangerous?, argues against the view of Dawkins and others that religion is socially dangerous.

Ethicist Margaret Somerville suggested that Dawkins "overstates the case against religion", particularly its role in human conflict.

Many of Dawkins' defenders claim that critics generally misunderstand his real point. During a debate on Radio 3 Hong Kong, David Nicholls, writer and president of the Atheist Foundation of Australia, reiterated Dawkins' sentiments that religion is an "unnecessary" aspect of global problems. Dawkins argues that "the existence of God is a scientific hypothesis like any other". He disagrees with Stephen Jay Gould's principle of nonoverlapping magisteria (NOMA). In an interview with the Time magazine, Dawkins said:

I think that Gould's separate compartments was a purely political ploy to win middle-of-the-road religious people to the science camp. But it's a very empty idea. There are plenty of places where religion does not keep off the scientific turf. Any belief in miracles is flat contradictory not just to the facts of science but to the spirit of science.

Astrophysicist Martin Rees has suggested that Dawkins' attack on mainstream religion is unhelpful. Regarding Rees' claim in his book Our Cosmic Habitat that "such questions lie beyond science; however, they are the province of philosophers and theologians", Dawkins asks "what expertise can theologians bring to deep cosmological questions that scientists cannot?" Elsewhere, Dawkins has written that "there's all the difference in the world between a belief that one is prepared to defend by quoting evidence and logic, and a belief that is supported by nothing more than tradition, authority or revelation."

=== Debate ===
On 3 October 2007, John Lennox, Professor of Mathematics at the University of Oxford, publicly debated Richard Dawkins at the University of Alabama at Birmingham on Dawkins' views as expressed in The God Delusion, and their validity over and against the Christian faith. "The God Delusion Debate" marked Dawkins' first visit to the Old South and the first significant discussion on this issue in the "Bible Belt". The event was sold out, and The Wall Street Journal called it "a revelation: in Alabama, a civil debate over God's existence." Dawkins debated Lennox for the second time at the Oxford University Museum of Natural History in October 2008. The debate was titled "Has Science Buried God?", in which Dawkins used a form of an Eddington concession in saying that, although he would not accept it, a reasonably respectable case could be made for "a deistic god, a sort of god of the physicist, a god of somebody like Paul Davies, who devised the laws of physics, god the mathematician, god who put together the cosmos in the first place and then sat back and watched everything happen" but not for a theistic god.

=== Reviews and responses ===
- Alvin Plantinga: The Dawkins Confusion
- Anthony Kenny: Knowledge, Belief, and Faith
- Thomas Nagel: The Fear of Religion
- Michael Ruse: Chicago Journals Review
- Richard Swinburne: Response to Richard Dawkins
- Alister McGrath and Joanna Collicutt McGrath: The Dawkins Delusion?
- H. Allen Orr: A Mission to Convert
- Terry Eagleton: London Review of Books, Lunging, Flailing, Mispunching
- Antony Flew: The God Delusion Review – Dawkins response
- Murrough O'Brien of The Independent: Our Teapot which art in heaven – Dawkins responds: Do you have to read up on leprechology before disbelieving in them?
- Marilynne Robinson: The God Delusion Review, Harper's Magazine 2006
- Simon Watson: "Richard Dawkins' The God Delusion and Atheist Fundamentalism," in Anthropoetics: The Journal of Generative Anthropology (Spring 2010)
- William Lane Craig: "Dawkins' Delusion", web article excerpted from Contending with Christianity's Critics

=== Sales ===
The book was ranked second on the Amazon best-sellers' list in November 2006.The God Delusion has been translated into 35 languages.

=== Awards ===
For The God Delusion, Dawkins was named Author of the Year at the 2007 British Book Awards. The Giordano Bruno Foundation awarded the 2007 Deschner Prize to Dawkins for the "outstanding contribution to strengthen secular, scientific, and humanistic thinking" in his book.

=== Responding books ===
Many books have been written in response to The God Delusion, including but not limited to:

- Atheist Delusions, by David Bentley Hart
- The Devil's Delusion, by David Berlinski
- Darwin's Angel, by John Cornwell
- God's Undertaker: Has Science Buried God?, by John Lennox (Oxford: Lion, 2009)
- The Dawkins Delusion?, by Alister McGrath and Joanna Collicutt McGrath

== Legal repercussions in Turkey ==
In Turkey, where the book had sold at least 6,000 copies, a prosecutor launched a probe into whether The God Delusion was "an attack on holy values", following a complaint in November 2007. If convicted, the Turkish publisher and translator, Erol Karaaslan, would have faced a prison sentence of inciting religious hatred and insulting religious values. In April 2008, the court acquitted the defendant. In ruling out the need to confiscate copies of the book, the presiding judge stated that banning it "would fundamentally limit the freedom of thought".

Dawkins' website, richarddawkins.net, was banned in Turkey later that year after complaints from Islamic creationist Adnan Oktar (Harun Yahya) for alleged defamation. By July 2011, the ban had been lifted.

== Editions ==
=== English ===
List of editions in English:

- (in English) The God Delusion, hardcover edition, Bantam Press, 2006.
  - The God Delusion, paperback edition (with new preface by Richard Dawkins), Black Swan, 2007.
  - The God Delusion, 10th anniversary edition (with new introduction by Richard Dawkins and afterword by Daniel Dennett), Black Swan, 2016.

=== Translations ===
The book has been officially translated into many different languages, such as Spanish, German, Italian, and Turkish. Dawkins has also promoted unofficial translations of the book in languages such as Arabic and Bengali. There are also Telugu and Tamil translations of the book. The Richard Dawkins Foundation offers free translations in Arabic, Urdu, Farsi, and Indonesian.

Non-exhaustive list of international editions:

- (in Greek) Η περί Θεού αυταπάτη, translated by Maria Giatroudaki, Panagiotis Delivorias, Alekos Mamalis, Nikos Ntaikos, Kostas Simos, Vasilis Sakellariou, 2007 (ISBN 978-960-6717-07-9).
- (in Brazilian Portuguese) Deus, um Delírio, translated by Fernanda Ravagnani, São Paulo: Companhia das Letras, 2007 (ISBN 9788535910704).
- (in Portuguese) A desilusão de Deus, translated by Lígia Rodrigues and Maria João Camilo, Lisbon: Casa das Letras, 2007 (ISBN 978-972-46-1758-9).
- (in Swedish) Illusionen om Gud, translated by Margareta Eklöf, Stockholm: Leopard, 2007 (ISBN 9789173431767).
- (in Finnish) Jumalharha, translated by Kimmo Pietiläinen, Helsinki: Terra Cognita, 2007 (ISBN 9789525697001).
- (in Turkish) Tanri Yanilgisi, translated by Tnc Bilgin, Kuzey Yayinlari, 2007 (ISBN 9944315117).
- (in Croatian) Iluzija o Bogu, translated by Žarko Vodinelić, Zagreb: Izvori, 2007 (ISBN 0-618-68000-4).
- (in Hungarian) Isteni téveszme, translated by János Kepes, Budapest: Nyitott Könyvműhely, 2007 (ISBN 9789639725164).
- (in German) Der Gotteswahn, translated by Sebastian Vogel, Ullstein Taschenbuch, 2008 (ISBN 3548372325).
- (in French) Pour en finir avec Dieu, translated by Marie-France Desjeux-Lefort, 2008 (ISBN 9782221108932).
- (in Italian) L'illusione di Dio, translated by Laura Serra, Milan: Arnoldo Mondadori Editore, 2008 (ISBN 8804581646).
- (in Norwegian) Gud – en vrangforestilling translated by Finn B. Larsen and Ingrid Sande Larsen, 2007 (ISBN 9788292769027).
- (in Russian) Бог как иллюзия, 2008 (ISBN 978-5-389-00334-7).
- (in Tamil) கடவுள் ஒரு பொய் நம்பிக்கை, translated by G. V. K. Aasaan, Cen̲n̲ai, 2009 (ISBN 9788189788056).
- (in Spanish) El espejismo de Dios, translated by Natalia Pérez-Galdós, Madrid: Espasa, 2013 (ISBN 8467031972).
- (in Latvian) Dieva delūzija, translated by Aldis Lauzis, Riga: Jumava, 2014 (ISBN 9789934115202).
- (in Slovak) Boží blud, translated by Jana Lenzová, Bratislava: Citadella, 2016 (ISBN 9788089628667).
- (in Slovene) Bog kot zabloda, translated by Maja Novak, Ljubljana: Modrijan 2016 (ISBN 9789612419646).
- (in Czech) Boží blud, translated by Zuzana Gabajová, Prague: Citadella, 2016 (ISBN 9788081820465).

== Interviews ==
- Paulson, Steve (13 October 2006). "The flying spaghetti monster". Salon.com. Archived from the original on 20 October 2011.
- "God vs. Science", discussion with Francis Collins, TIME, 13 November 2006
- "The God Delusion", interview with George Stroumboulopoulos, The Hour, 5 May 2007
- "God . . . in other words", interview with Ruth Gledhill, The Times, 10 May 2007
- "Richard Dawkins: An Argument for Atheism", interview with Terry Gross, Fresh Air, 7 March 2008

== See also ==
- Religious delusion
- Agent detection
- Why I Am Not a Christian (1927) by Bertrand Russell
- The Future of an Illusion (1927) by Sigmund Freud, which also proposes that theism results from a delusional belief system
- Atheism: The Case Against God (1974) by George H. Smith
- Breaking the Spell: Religion as a Natural Phenomenon (2006), a similar book by Daniel Dennett
- Efficacy of prayer
- Evolutionary psychology of religion
- God of the gaps
- Joan Roughgarden – Christian evolutionary biologist, who also disputes Dawkins' stance on gender and cooperation.
- Morality without religion
- Pascal's Wager
- New Atheism
- Spectrum of theistic probability
