= Criticism of religion =

Criticism against religions

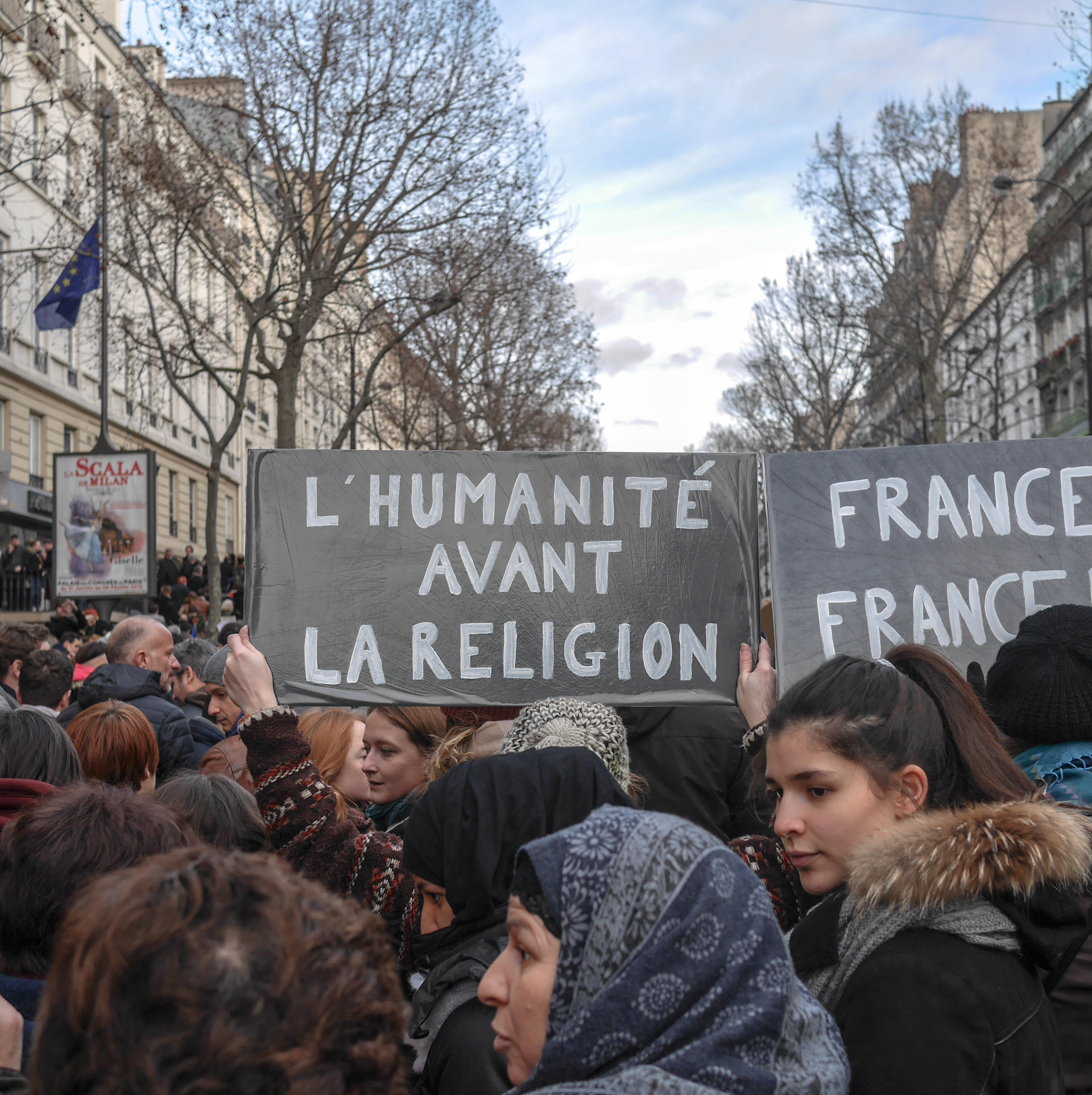
"Humanity before religion" signs in Paris during a rally in support of the victims of the 2015 Charlie Hebdo shooting

Criticism of religion is the criticism of the validity, concept, or ideas of religion. Historical records of criticism of religion go back to at least the 5th century BCE in ancient Greece, in Athens specifically, with Diagoras "the Atheist" of Melos. In ancient Rome, an early known example is Lucretius' De rerum natura from the 1st century BCE.

Every exclusive religion on Earth (as well as every exclusive world view, including non-religion) that promotes exclusive truth-claims necessarily denigrates the beliefs of other worldviews. Thus, some criticisms of religion become criticisms of one or more aspects of a specific religious tradition. Critics of religion in general may view religion as any number of the following: outdated, harmful to the individual, harmful to society, an impediment to the progress of science or humanity, a source of immoral acts or customs, and a political tool for social control.

== Definition of religion ==
Religion is a modern Western concept that developed from the 17th century onwards, not before. For example, in Asia, no one before the 19th century self-identified as a "Hindu" or other similar identities. The ancient and medieval cultures that produced religious texts, like the Hebrew Bible, New Testament or the Quran, did not have such a conception or idea in their languages, cultures, or histories and neither did the peoples in the Americas before Columbus. Into the 21st century, even though modern researchers conceive religion broadly as an abstraction which entails beliefs, doctrines, and sacred places, there is still no scholarly consensus over what a religion is.

== History of criticism ==
In his work De rerum natura, the 1st-century BCE Roman poet Titus Lucretius Carus wrote: "But 'tis that same religion oftener far / Hath bred the foul impieties of men." A philosopher of the Epicurean school, Lucretius believed the world was composed solely of matter and void and that all phenomena could be understood as resulting from purely natural causes. Despite believing in gods, Lucretius, like Epicurus, felt that religion was born of fear and ignorance, and that understanding the natural world would free people of its shackles. He was not against religion in and of itself, but against traditional religion which he saw as superstition for teaching that gods interfered with the world.

During the Islamic Golden Age, philosopher Al-Ma'arri criticized all prophets' statements as fabrications, and branded God in Islam a hypocrite for forbidding murder but sending angels to take each man's life. In the 18th century, the French Enlightenment philosopher Voltaire was a Deist and strongly critical of religious intolerance. Voltaire complained about Jews killed by other Jews for worshiping a golden calf and similar actions; he also condemned how Christians killed other Christians over religious differences and how Christians killed Native Americans for not being baptised. Voltaire claimed the real reason for these killings was that Christians wanted to plunder the wealth of those killed. Voltaire was also critical of Muslim intolerance towards other religions. Also in the 18th century, the Scottish Enlightenment philosopher David Hume criticised the teleological arguments for religion. Hume claimed that natural explanations for the order in the universe were reasonable. An important aim of Hume's writings was demonstrating the unsoundness of the philosophical basis for religion.

The 18th-century American Enlightenment political philosopher and religious skeptic Thomas Paine criticized the Abrahamic religions. In The Age of Reason (1793–1794) and other writings he advocated Deism, promoted reason and freethought, and argued against institutionalized religions in general and the Christian doctrine in particular.

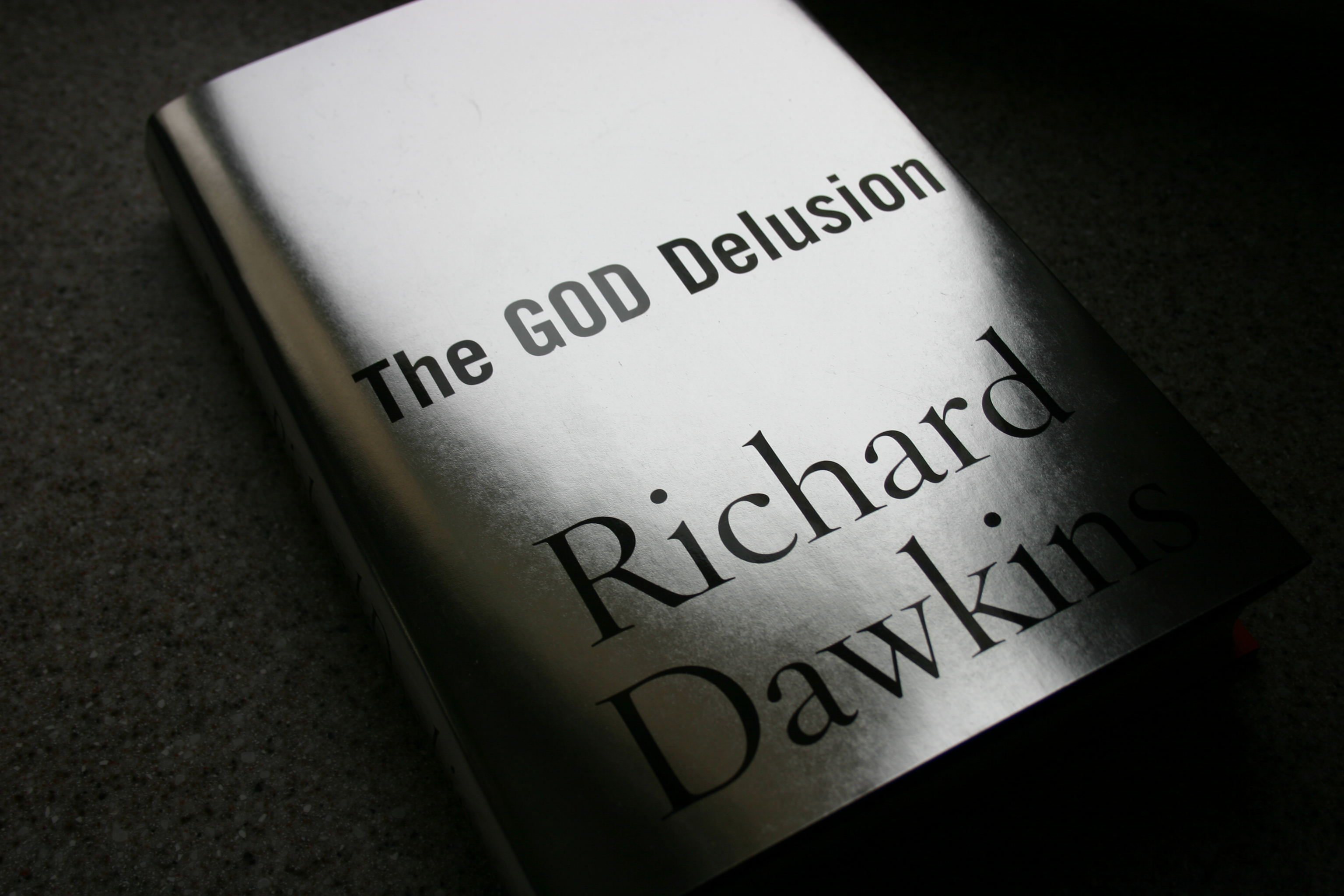
The cover page of Richard Dawkins' book The God Delusion

In the early 21st century, the New Atheists became focal polemicists in modern criticism of religion. The four authors come from widely different backgrounds and have published books which have been the focus of criticism of religion narratives, with over 100 books and hundreds of scholarly articles commenting on and critiquing the "Four Horsemen's" works. Their books and articles have spawned debate in multiple fields of inquiry and are heavily quoted in popular media (online forums, YouTube, television and popular philosophy). In The End of Faith, philosopher Sam Harris focused on what he perceived as negative qualities of religion including violence. In Breaking the Spell, philosopher Daniel Dennett focused on the question of "why we believe strange things". In The God Delusion, biologist Richard Dawkins discussed religion broadly. In God Is Not Great, journalist and polemicist Christopher Hitchens claimed religious forces attack human dignity and wrote about corruption in religious organizations.

== Origin and function of religion ==
=== Social construct ===
Dennett and Harris have asserted that theist religions and their scriptures are not divinely inspired, but man made to fulfill social, biological and political needs. Dawkins balances the benefits of religious beliefs (mental solace, community building and promotion of virtuous behavior) against the drawbacks. Such criticisms treat religion as a social construct, and thus just another human ideology.

=== Narratives to provide comfort and meaning ===
David Hume argued that religion developed as a source of comfort in the face of adversity, not as an honest grappling with verifiable truth. Religion is therefore an unsophisticated form of reasoning. Daniel Dennett has argued that, with the exception of more modern religions such as Raëlism, Mormonism, Scientology and the Baháʼí Faith, most religions were formulated at a time when the origin of life, the workings of the body, and the nature of the stars and planets were poorly understood. These narratives were intended to give solace and a sense of relationship with larger forces. As such, they may have served several important functions in ancient societies. Examples include the views many religions traditionally had towards solar and lunar eclipses and the appearance of comets (forms of astrology). Given current understanding of the physical world, where human knowledge has increased dramatically, Dawkins and French atheist philosopher Michel Onfray contend that continuing to hold on to these belief systems is irrational and no longer useful.

==== Opium of the people ====
Religious suffering is, at the same time, the expression of real suffering and a protest against real suffering. Religion is the sigh of the oppressed creature, the heart of a heartless world, and the soul of soulless conditions. It is the opium of the people.

— Karl Marx

According to Karl Marx, the father of "scientific socialism", religion is a tool used by the ruling classes whereby the masses can shortly relieve their suffering via the act of experiencing religious emotions. It is in the interest of the ruling classes to instill in the masses the religious conviction that their current suffering will lead to eventual happiness. Therefore, as long as the public believes in religion, they will not attempt to make any genuine effort to understand and overcome the real source of their suffering, which in Marx's opinion was their capitalist economic system. In this perspective, Marx saw religion as escapism.

Marx also viewed the Christian doctrine of original sin as being deeply anti-social in character. Original sin, he argued, convinces people that the source of their misery lies in the inherent and unchangeable "sinfulness" of humanity rather than in the forms of social organization and institutions, which Marx argued can be changed through the application of collective social planning.

=== Viruses of the mind ===
In his 1976 book The Selfish Gene, Richard Dawkins coined the term memes to describe informational units that can be transmitted culturally, analogous to genes. He later used this concept in the essay "Viruses of the Mind" to explain the persistence of religious ideas in human culture. Some people have criticized the idea that "God" and "Faith" are viruses of the mind, suggesting that it is far removed from evidence and data" that it is unreasonable to extract certain behaviours solely through religious memes. Alister McGrath has responded by arguing that "memes have no place in serious scientific reflection", or that religious ideas function the way Dawkins claims.

=== Mental illness or delusion ===
Sam Harris compares religion to a mental illness, saying that it "allows otherwise normal human beings to reap the fruits of madness and consider them holy". According to a retrospective study (2011) of Abraham, Moses, Jesus Christ, and the Apostle Paul, they may have had psychotic disorders that contributed inspirations for their revelations. He concludes that people with such disorders have had a monumental influence on civilization. The issue of Jesus' mental health has been and is the subject of discussion and analysis.

Psychological studies into the phenomenon of mysticism link disturbing aspects of certain mystics' experiences to childhood abuse. Clifford A. Pickover found evidence which suggests that temporal lobe epilepsy may be linked to a variety of so-called spiritual or "other worldly" experiences, such as spiritual possessions, which occur as the result of altered electrical activity in the brain. Carl Sagan, in his last book The Demon-Haunted World: Science as a Candle in the Dark, presented his belief that the miraculous sightings of religious figures and modern sightings of UFOs were all caused by the same mental disorder. Vilayanur S. Ramachandran suggests "It's possible that many great religious leaders had temporal lobe seizures and this predisposes them to having visions, having mystical experiences". Michael Persinger artificially stimulated the temporal lobes of the brain with a magnetic field by using a device which he nicknamed the "God helmet" and he was able to artificially induce religious experiences along with near-death experiences and ghost sightings. According to John Bradshaw "Some forms of temporal lobe tumours or epilepsy are associated with extreme religiosity." In his research recent brain imaging of religious subjects praying or meditating show identical activity in the respective human section of the brain which Ramachandran calls God-spots.

Psilocybin from mushrooms affect regions of the brain including the serotonergic system, which generating a sense of strong religious meaning, unity and ecstasy. Certain physical rituals may generate similar feelings.

In his book Why People Believe Weird Things, Michael Shermer theorizes that emerging mankind imposed made-up explanations and bizarre rituals for natural phenomena which they did not and could not understand. This theory is similar to the arguments which Daniel Dennett wrote in Breaking the Spell; however, Shermer's argument goes further by stating that the peculiar and at times the frightening rituals of religion are but one of many forms of strange customs that survive to this day.

=== Immature stage of societal development ===
Philosopher Auguste Comte posited that many societal constructs pass through three stages and that religion corresponds to the two earlier, or more primitive stages by stating: "From the study of the development of human intelligence, in all directions, and through all times, the discovery arises of a great fundamental law, to which it is necessarily subjective, and which has a solid foundation of proof, both in the facts of our organization and in our historical experience. The law is this: that each of our leading conceptions – each branch of our knowledge – passes successively through three different theoretical conditions: the theological, or fictitious; the metaphysical, or abstract; and the scientific, or positive".

=== Response to criticism ===
In his book Is Religion Dangerous?, theologian Keith Ward notes that not all false opinions are delusions and that belief in God is different as many great minds and people who live ordinary lives and believe in God are not irrational people. Hyperreligiosity or intensely professed atheism can emerge from emotional disturbances involving temporal lobe epilepsy.

== Discrepancy ==
Discrepancies in the Bible among the four Gospels of the New Testament is criticised by Bible scholar Bruce M. Metzger.

== Arguments which state that religion is harmful to individuals ==
Some have criticized the effects of the adherence to dangerous practices such as self-denial and altruistic suicide.

=== Inadequate medical care ===
A detailed study in 1998 found 140 instances of deaths of children due to religion-based medical neglect. Most of these cases involved Christian parents who withheld medical care and relied on prayer to cure the child's disease.

=== Honor killings and stoning ===
Once well known in Western countries, honor killings are now an extremely rare occurrence; however, they still occur in other parts of the world. An honor killing occurs when a person is killed by their family for bringing dishonor or shame upon it.

Stoning is a form of capital punishment in which a group batters a person with thrown stones until the person dies. As of September 2010, stoning is a punishment that is included in the laws of some countries, including Saudi Arabia, Sudan, Yemen, the United Arab Emirates, and some states in Nigeria as punishment for zina al-mohsena ("adultery of married persons"). While stoning may not be codified in the laws of Afghanistan and Somalia, both countries have seen several incidents of stoning to death.

Until the early 2000s, stoning was a legal form of capital punishment in Iran. In 2002, the Iranian judiciary officially placed a moratorium on stoning. In 2005, judiciary spokesman Jamal Karimirad stated that "in the Islamic republic, we do not see such punishments being carried out", further adding that if stoning sentences were passed by lower courts, they were overruled by higher courts and "no such verdicts have been carried out". In 2008, the judiciary decided to fully scrap the punishment from the books in legislation submitted to parliament for approval. In early 2013, the Iranian parliament published an official report about excluding stoning from the penal code and it accused Western media of spreading "noisy propaganda" about the case.

=== Genital modification and mutilation ===
According to the World Health Organization, female genital mutilation has no health benefits and is a violation of basic human rights. Though no first tier religious texts prescribe the practice, some practitioners do believe there is religious support for it. While it is mostly found in Muslim countries, it is also practiced by some Christian and Animist countries mostly in Africa. GFA is not widely practiced in some Muslim countries making it difficult to separate religion from culture. Some religious leaders promote it, some consider it irrelevant to religion, and others contribute to its elimination. The practice is illegal in all Western countries and it is also illegal to transport a girl to another country to carry out FGM. Multiple parents have been charged for committing this crime in the United Kingdom, with those charged being exclusively from Muslim countries. The Jewish Bible, the New Testament, and the Quran themselves do not contain textual support for the practice of female genital mutilation even though the practice predates both Islam and Christianity.

Male circumcision is required in Judaism, optional in Islam, and not required in Christianity. Globally, male circumcision is done for religious, social, and health reasons. Male circumcision is a painful process and can lead to bleeding and in some cases severe side effects including penile dysfunction and even death.

Genital modifications and mutilations like subincision, female genital mutilation, and circumcision are usually performed on children or infants which raises issues of consent. Circumcision performed under duress, to force someone into a religion, or to humiliate someone of another religion is called forced circumcision.

=== Religious censorship ===
Religious censorship is a form of censorship where freedom of expression is controlled or limited using religious authority or on the basis of the teachings of the religion. This form of censorship has a long history and is practiced in many societies and by many religions. Examples include the Edict of Compiègne, the Index Librorum Prohibitorum (list of prohibited books) and the condemnation of music in Islam.

=== Lack of choice ===
Many religions spread partially via proselytizing, coercion, and force. Some countries have an official state religion and may have laws enforcing that people must be that religion, or pretend to be. Some countries also enforce punishments for apostates, people who become atheist or convert to a different religion. The punishment for leaving Islam includes the death penalty in ten countries as of the 2020s. Not all countries have freedom of religion and fewer have freedom from religion. People are often introduced to their parent's religion from a young age and are forced to participate in religious ceremonies and practices that they are uninterested in or actively harm them. Japan has made it illegal to force a child to participate in religious activities. Some religions become so intense and manipulative they are called cults. These groups are much stricter about behavior and may engage in abuse towards people who try to leave or even show signs of considering it.

=== Counterarguments to claims that religion is harmful to individuals ===
A meta-review of 850 research papers on Religion in the United States concluded that "the majority of well-conducted studies found that higher levels of religious involvement are positively associated with indicators of psychological well-being (life satisfaction, happiness, positive affect, and higher morale) and with less depression, suicidal thoughts and behavior, drug/alcohol use/abuse". A meta-review of 147 studies states that religiousness is mildly associated with fewer depression symptoms and that life events can still increase depressive symptoms. In a meta-review of 498 studies states that religious involvement in general is associated with: less depression, lower drug and alcohol abuse, less promiscuous sexual behaviors, reduced likelihood of suicide, lower rates of delinquency and crime, educational attainment and purpose or meaning in life. A meta analysis of 34 studies states that a positive relationship still emerges between religion and mental health even when using different conceptualizations of religiosity and mental health used in different studies. According to Robert Putnam, membership of religious groups in the United States was positively correlated with membership of voluntary organizations, higher level of commitment, better self-esteem, lower risk of suicide, higher life satisfaction. According to Pew Research Center's 2019 global study, when comparing religious people to those who have less or no religion, actively religious people are more likely to describe themselves as "very happy", join other mundane organizations like charities or clubs, vote, and at the same time were less likely to smoke and drink. However, there was no correlation between religiosity and self perception of better health.

An investigation on subjective well-being representing 90% of the world population has noted that, globally, religious people are usually happier than nonreligious people, though nonreligious people also reach high levels of happiness.

As of 2001, much of research on religion and health has been conducted within the United States. According to one study, there was no significant correlation between religiosity and individual happiness in Denmark and the Netherlands, countries that have lower rates of religion, lower discrimination against atheists and where both the religious and non-religious are normative.

Despite honor killings occurring in multiple cultures and religions, Islam is frequently blamed for their institution and persistence. Professor Tahira Shaid Khan notes that there is nothing in the Qur'an that permits or sanctions honor killings, and attributes it to broader attitudes that view women as property with no rights as the explanation for honor killings. Khan also argues that this view results in violence against women and their being turned "into a commodity which can be exchanged, bought and sold".

== Arguments which state that religion is harmful to society ==
Some aspects of religion are criticized on the basis that they damage society as a whole. For example, Steven Weinberg states that it takes religion to make good people do evil. Bertrand Russell and Richard Dawkins cite religiously inspired or justified violence, resistance to social change, attacks on science, oppression of women and homophobia.

John Hartung has claimed that major religious moral codes can lead to "us vs. them" group solidarity and a mentality which can lead people to dehumanise or demonise individuals who are outside their group by portraying them as individuals who are either less worthy or "not fully human". The results of this attitude can vary from mild discrimination to outright genocide. A poll by The Guardian noted that 82% of the British people believe that religion is socially divisive and that this effect is harmful despite the observation that non-believers outnumber believers two to one.

According to one study, membership in a religious group can accentuate biases in behavior towards in group versus out group members, which may explain the lower number of interracial friends and the greater approval of torture among church members.

=== Holy war and religious terrorism ===
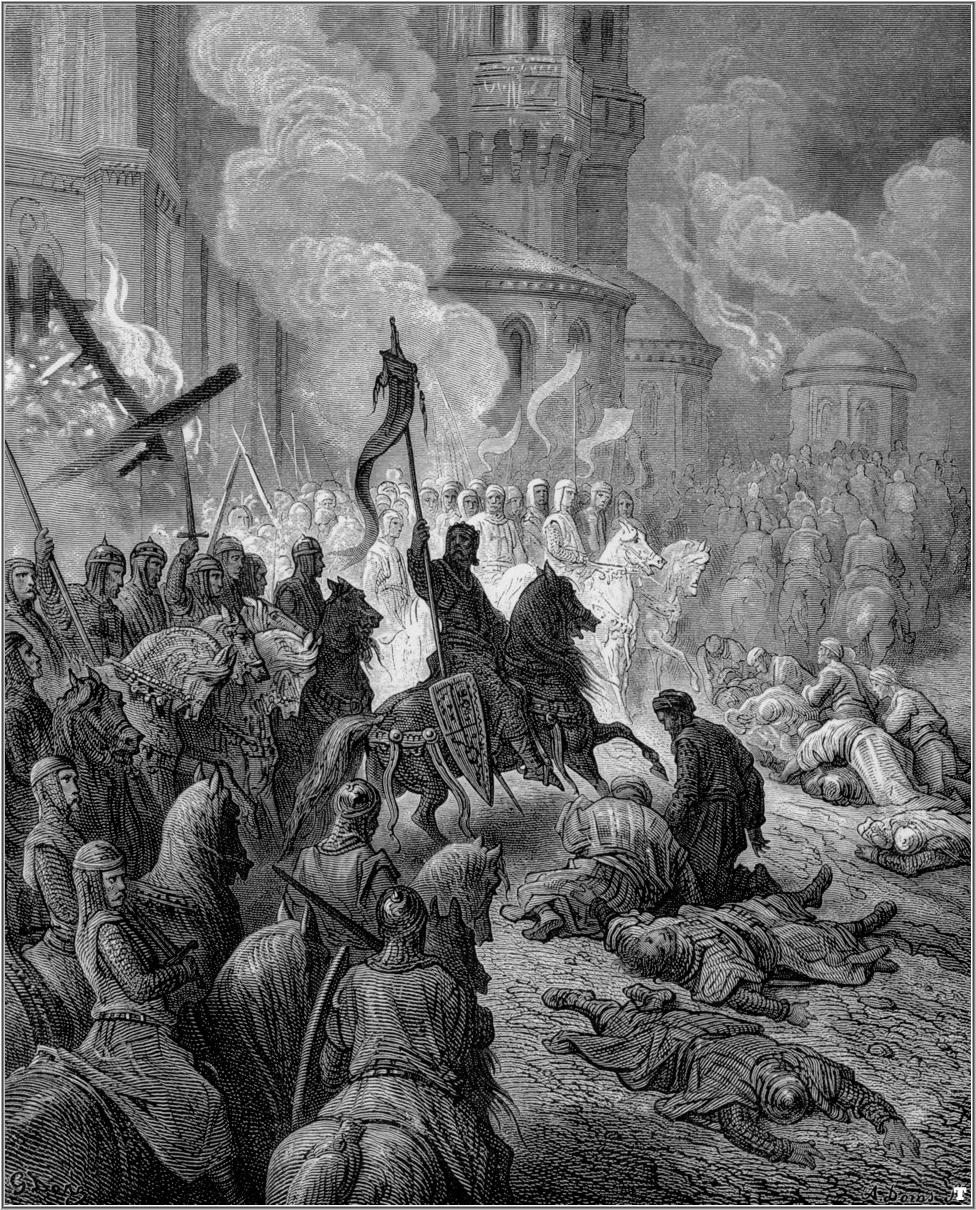
Entry of the Crusaders into Constantinople by Gustave Doré (1832–1883)

While terrorism is a complex subject, it is argued that terrorists are partially reassured by their religious views that God supports and rewards their actions.

These conflicts are among the most difficult to resolve, particularly when both sides believe that God is on their side and has endorsed the moral righteousness of their claims. One of the most infamous quote which is associated with religious fanaticism was made during the siege of Béziers in 1209, a Crusader asked the Papal Legate Arnaud Amalric how to differentiate Catholics from Cathars when the city was taken, to which Amalric replied: "Tuez-les tous; Dieu reconnaitra les siens", or "Kill them all; God will recognize his own".

Theoretical physicist Michio Kaku considers religious terrorism one of the main threats to humanity's evolution from a Type 0 to a Type 1 civilization.

However, historians of war state that multiple quantitative studies have shown that religion was not a common source for war or conflict, and due to this, historians have not embraced narratives that religion has caused frequent conflict or war in history.

=== Suppression of scientific progress ===
Some criticisms of religions have been religion is wrong as it is in conflict with science (i.e. Genesis creation myth, Hindu creationism). Recent examples of tensions between religion and science have been the creation–evolution controversy, controversies over the use of birth control, opposition to research into embryonic stem cells, or theological objections to vaccination, anesthesia and blood transfusion.

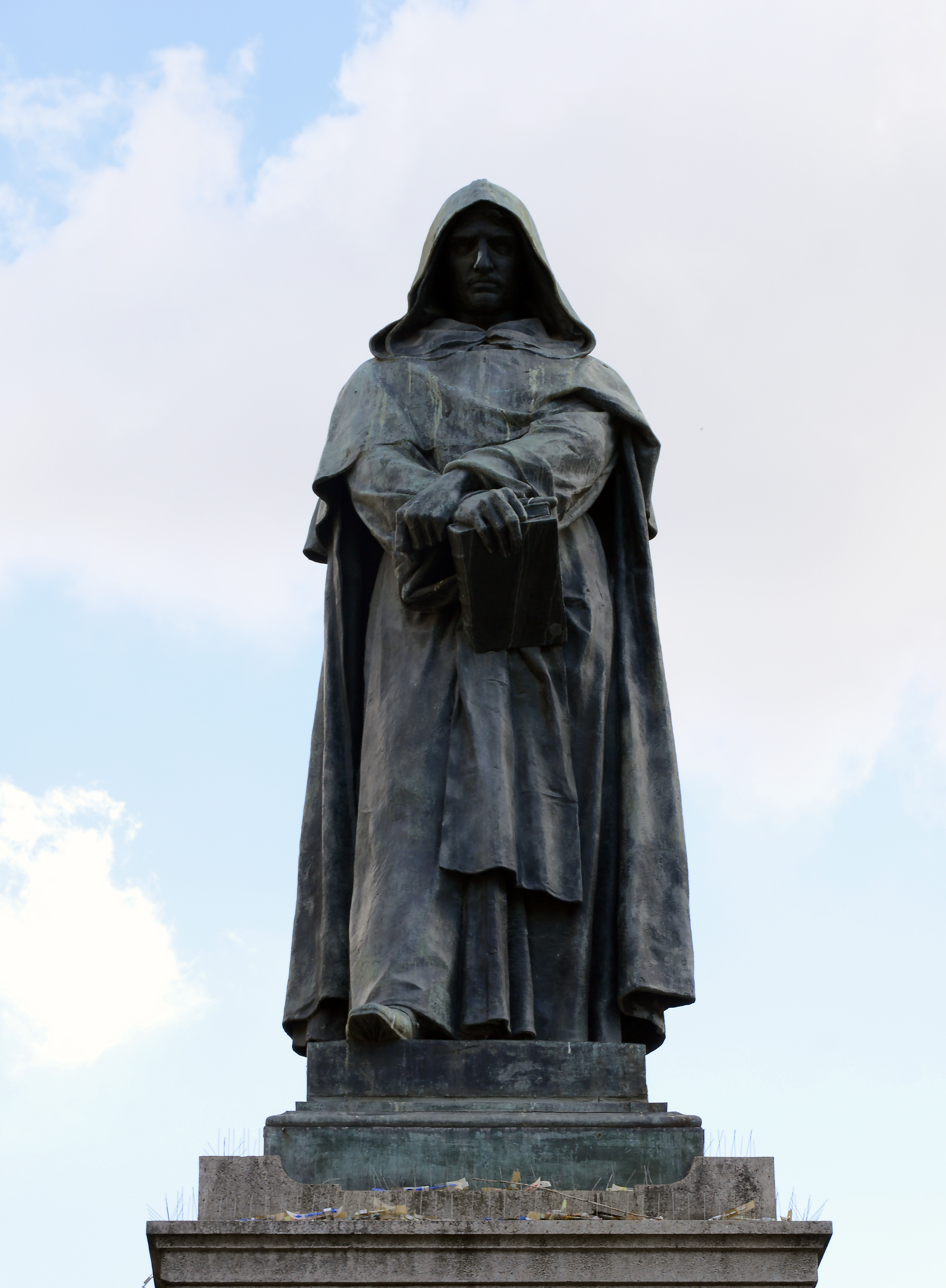
The monument to Giordano Bruno in the place he was executed in Rome

During the 19th century, the conflict thesis developed. John William Draper and Andrew Dickson White argued that when a religion offers a complete set of answers, it often discourages exploration of those areas by suppressing curiosity, denies its followers a broader perspective and can prevent social, moral and scientific progress. Examples cited in their writings include the trial of Galileo and Giordano Bruno's execution. According to this model, interaction between religion and science leads to hostility, with religion usually taking the part of the aggressor against new scientific ideas. The historical conflict thesis was a popular historiographical approach in the history of science during the late 19th and early 20th centuries, but its original form had been discredited by the 1980s and is not held by historians of science today. Despite that, conflict theory remains a popular view among the general public and is limited to a few sets of controversies such as creation–evolution, stem cells, and birth control. Books such as The God Delusion and Faith Versus Fact still argue for the conflict thesis.

Studies on the actual beliefs held by scientists show that most scientists globally do not subscribe to conflict thesis and instead the majority believe that the relation between science and religion is independence or collaboration. Historians of science including John Hedley Brooke and Ronald Numbers consider the "religion vs. science" concept an oversimplification, and prefer to take a more nuanced view of the subject. These historians cite, for example, the Galileo affair and the Scopes trial; and assert that these were not purely instances of conflict between science and religion as personal and political factors also weighed heavily in the development of each. In addition, some historians contend that religious organizations figure prominently in the broader histories of many sciences, with many of the scientific minds until the professionalization of scientific enterprise (in the 19th century) being clergy and other religious thinkers. Some historians contend that many scientific developments such as Kepler's laws and the 19th-century reformulation of physics in terms of energy were explicitly driven by religious ideas.

=== Counterarguments to claims that religion is harmful to society ===
Some studies show that some positive links exist in the relationship between religiosity, moral behavior and altruism. Some studies have shown similar correlations between religiosity and giving. Historically, Christianity invented socially beneficial institutions like public hospitals, orphanages, poorhouses, or old persons' homes; government assistance to help those in need, private charities to the poor, homeless, and hungry; and expanded the moral compass to include strangers.

Some argue that religious violence confuses religious moral rules and behaviour with non-religious factors. This includes the claim that events like terrorist bombings are more politically motivated than religious. Mark Juergensmeyer argues that religion "does not ordinarily lead to violence. That happens only with the coalescence of a peculiar set of circumstances – political, social, and ideological – when religion becomes fused with violent expressions of social aspirations, personal pride, and movements for political change", and that it is unreasonable to attempt to differentiate "religious violence" and "secular violence" as separate categories. While others assert religion is not inherently violent and while the two are compatible they are not essential and that religious violence can be compared with non-religious violence.

C. S. Lewis suggests that all religions by definition involve faith, or a belief in concepts that cannot be proven or disproven by the sciences. Not all religious people subscribe to the idea that religion and science are mutually exclusive (non-overlapping magisteria) as do some atheists including Stephen Jay Gould. Biologist Richard Dawkins has said that religious practitioners often do not believe in the view of non-overlapping magisteria.

According to a survey most religious groups in the United States have no general epistemological conflict with science or with the seeking out of scientific knowledge even if there are epistemic or moral conflicts with their faith. Strict creationists tend to have very favorable views on many of the different sciences. A study on a national sample of United States college students found that the majority of undergraduates in both the natural and social sciences do not see conflict between science and religion. Cross-national studies polled from 1981 to 2001 on views of science and religion have noted that countries with higher religiosity have stronger trust in science.

== Morality ==
Richard Dawkins contends that theistic religions devalue human compassion and morality. In his view, the Bible contains many injunctions against following one's conscience over scripture and positive actions are supposed to originate not from compassion, but from the fear of punishment. Albert Einstein stated that "A man's ethical behavior should be based effectually on sympathy, education, and social ties; no religious basis is necessary. Man would indeed be in a poor way if he had to be restrained by fear of punishment and hope of reward after death".

=== Children ===
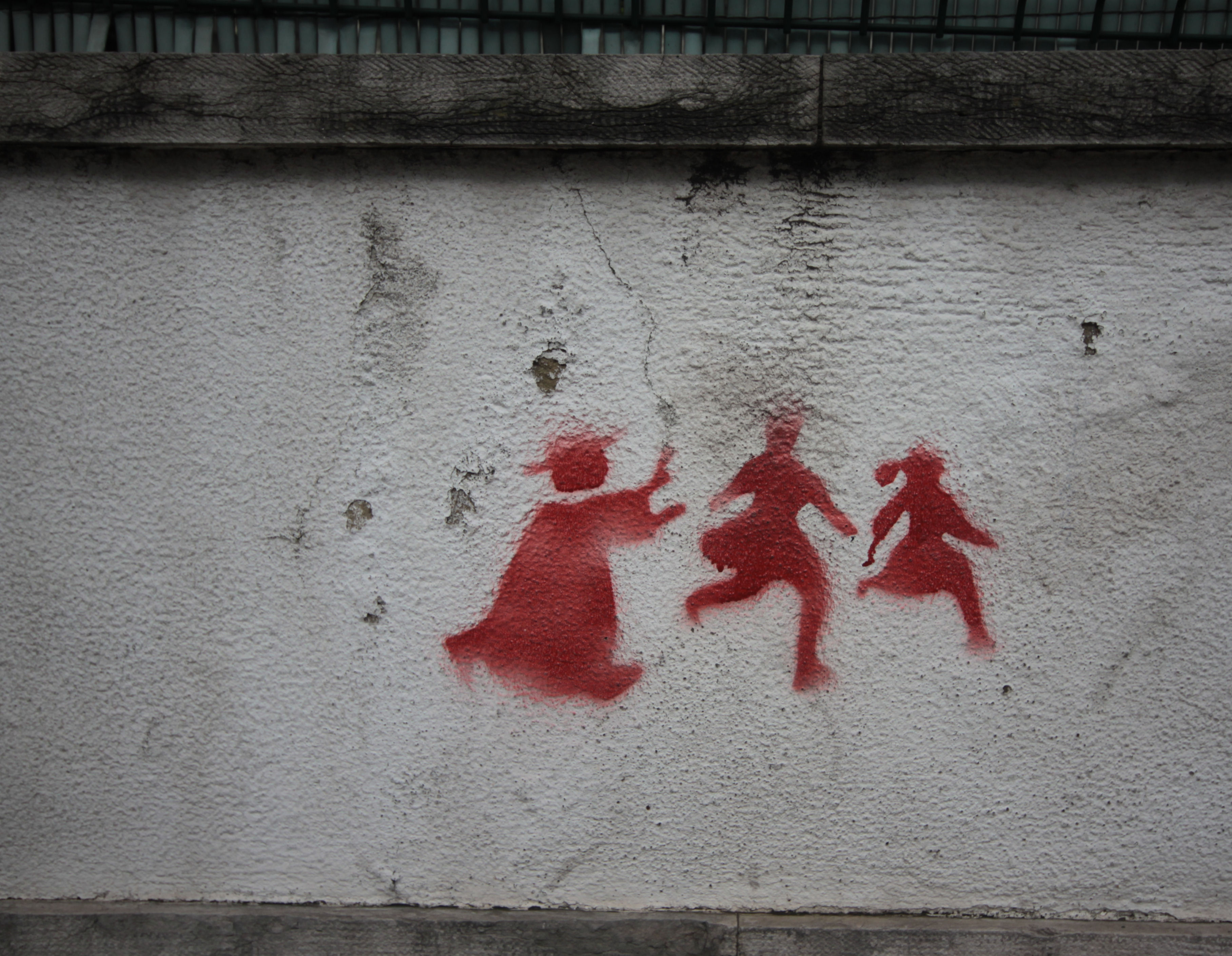
Graffiti in Portugal about Catholic Church sexual abuse cases

In the 19th century, philosopher Arthur Schopenhauer argued that teaching some ideas to children at a young age could foster resistance to doubting those ideas later on.

Some clerics of Islam have permitted the child marriage of older men to girls as young as 9 years of age. Baptist pastor Jerry Vines denounced Mohammed as a pedophile for marrying and having had sex with a nine-year-old. For example, one organisation cites the case of a 10-year-old girl who was forced to marry and was raped in Yemen (Nujood Ali), a 13-year-old Yemeni girl dying of internal bleeding three days after marriage and a 12-year-old girl dying in childbirth after marriage. Yemen currently does not have a minimum age for marriage.

Latter Day Saint church founder Joseph Smith married girls as young as 13 and 14 and other Latter Day Saints married girls as young as 10. The Church of Jesus Christ of Latter-day Saints eliminated underaged marriages in the 19th century, but several branches of Mormonism continue the practice.

=== Homosexuals ===
Homosexuality is generally condemned in Abrahamic religions where prohibition and execution of those who engage in male homosexual activity are found in the Old Testament of the Bible and in the Quran. Homosexuals are also condemned in the New Testament several times but without obligatory punishment. In the United States, conservative Christian right groups such as the Christian Legal Society and the Alliance Defense Fund have filed numerous lawsuits against public universities, aimed at overturning policies that protect homosexuals from discrimination and hate speech. These groups argue that such policies infringe their right to freely exercise religion as guaranteed by the Free Exercise Clause of the First Amendment of the United States Constitution.

Most secularised Christian countries have legalised homosexual activity and several have legalised same-sex marriage. However, not all historically Christian countries have done so such as Russia and Uganda which have introduced discriminatory laws ranging from anti-propaganda laws to corporal punishment. Homosexuality is still illegal in most Muslim countries and several of these countries impose the death penalty for homosexual behavior. In July 2005, two Iranian men aged sixteen and eighteen were, supposedly, hanged for homosexuality, causing an international outcry. They were executed after being convicted by the court of having raped a 13-year-old boy. The case attracted international media attention. The British lesbian, gay and bisexual group OutRage! alleged that the teenagers were executed for consensual homosexual acts and not rape.

=== Racism ===
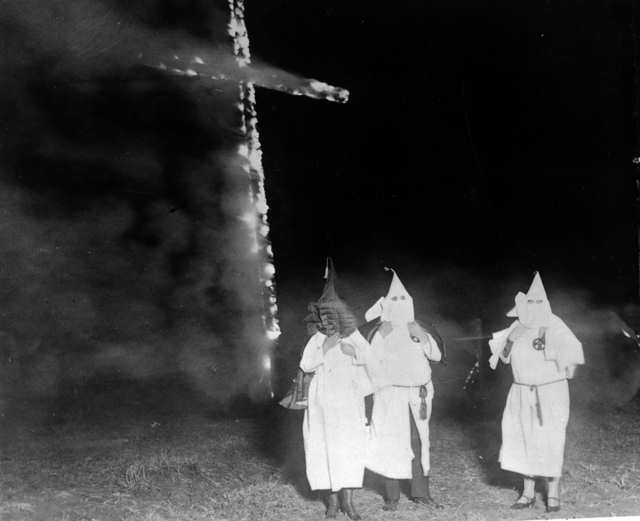
The Ku Klux Klan frequently used the burning cross to intimidate minorities.

In line with other findings which suggest that religious humanitarianism is largely directed at in-group members, greater religious identification, greater extrinsic religiosity and greater religious fundamentalism were associated with racial prejudices. This fact is congruent with the fact that 50% of religious congregations in the US are racially segregated, and only 12% of them have a degree of diversity.

Some people have used religion as a justification for advocating racism. The Christian Identity movement has been associated with racism. However, it has been argued that these positions may be reflections of contemporary social views as well as reflections of what has been called scientific racism.

The Church of Jesus Christ of Latter-day Saints had excluded African Americans from the priesthood from 1849 to 1978. Most fundamentalist Mormon sects within the Latter Day Saint movement rejected the Church's 1978 decision to allow black men to hold the priesthood, and in accordance with this view they continue to deny black people's right to play an active role in the church because of their race. Due to these beliefs, in its Spring 2005 "Intelligence Report" the Southern Poverty Law Center added the Fundamentalist Church of Jesus Christ of Latter-Day Saints to its "hate group" listing because of the church's teachings on race, which include strong condemnation of interracial relationships.

=== Women ===
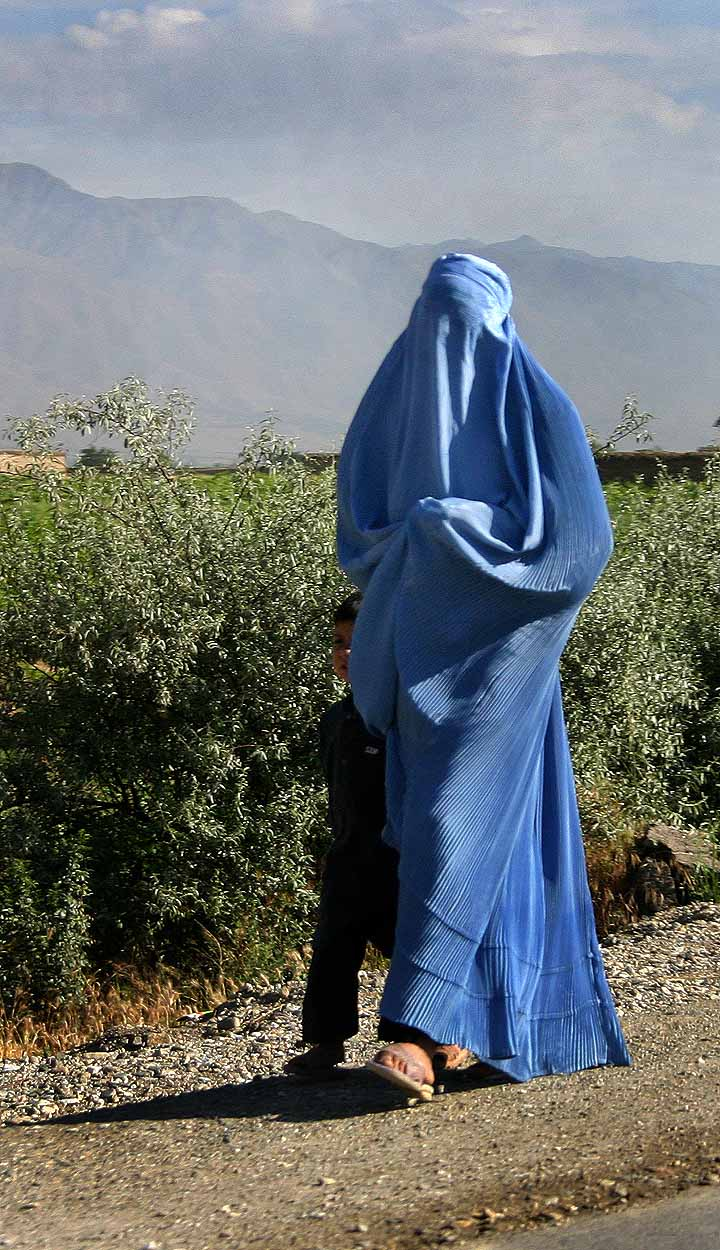
A woman with burqa on walking by the road in northern Afghanistan

The content of the holy books of Abrahamic religions contain severe restrictions on the rights of women ranging from prohibiting women from certain behaviour and activities to requiring women to submit to the will of their father and or husband.

According to Polly Toynbee, religion interferes with bodily autonomy regardless of gender but fosters particularly negative attitudes towards women's bodies. Toynbee writes: "Women's bodies are always the issue - too unclean to be bishops, and dangerous enough to be covered up by Islam and mikvahed by Judaism".

It is argued that religious sexual discrimination leads to unequal relations in marriage, creating norms which subordinate the wife to the husband. The word בעל (ba`al), Hebrew for "husband", used throughout the Bible, is synonymous with "owner" and "master". This mirrors the Abrahamic view of God as an omnipotent, perfect power, where this power is one of domination, which is persistently associated with the characteristics of ideal masculinity. Sheila Jeffreys argues:

Religion gives authority to traditional, patriarchal beliefs about the essentially subordinate nature of women and their naturally separate roles, such as the need for women to be confined to the private world of the home and family, that women should be obedient to their husbands, that women's sexuality should be modest and under the control of their menfolk, and that women should not use contraception or abortion to limit their childbearing. The practice of such ancient beliefs interferes profoundly with women's abilities to exercise their human rights.

==== Islam ====
Feminist Julie Bindel argues that religions encourage the domination of men over women and she also argues that Islam promotes the submission of women to their husbands by encouraging practices such as child marriage. She wrote that religion "promotes inequality between men and women", that Islam's message for a woman includes that "she will be subservient to her husband and devote her life to pleasing him" and that "Islam's obsession with virginity and childbirth has led to gender segregation and early marriage.

Islamic laws have been criticized by human rights organizations for exposing women to mistreatment and violence, preventing women from reporting rape and contributing to the discrimination of women. The United Nations say that Islam is used to justify unnecessary and harmful female genital mutilation, when the purposes range from deprivation of sexual satisfaction to discourage adultery, insuring virginity to their husbands, or generating appearance of virginity. Maryam Namazie argues that in both civil and criminal matters (such as punishments which are imposed on them for improper veiling), women are victimized by Sharia law; and she also argues that women have judicial hurdles that are either lenient or advantageous for men.

According to Phyllis Chesler, Islam is connected to violence against women, especially in the form of honor killings. She rejects the argument which states that honor killings are not related to Islam and claims that while fundamentalists of all religions impose restrictions upon women, in Islam, not only are these restrictions harsher, Islam also reacts more violently when these rules are broken.

==== Christianity ====
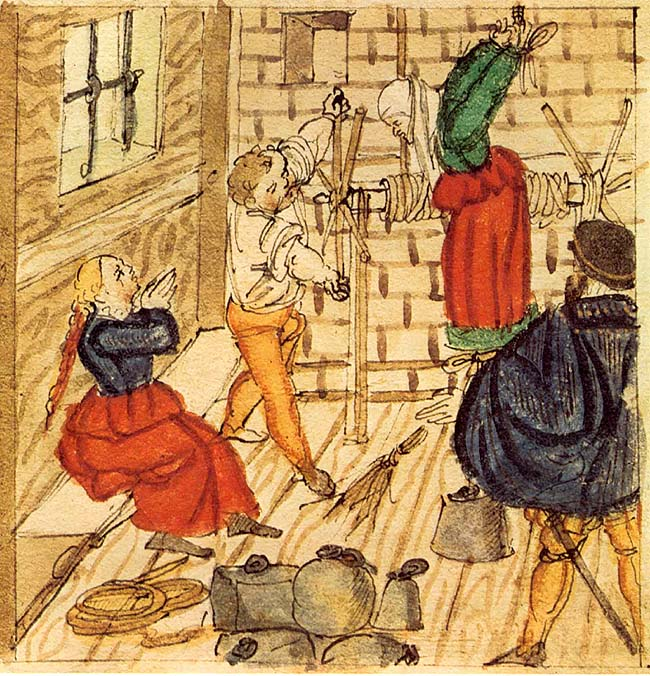
The torture used against accused witches, 1577

Christianity has been criticized for portraying women as sinful, untrustworthy, deceitful and desiring to seduce and incite men into sexual sin. Katharine M. Rogers argues that Christianity is misogynistic and that the "dread of female seduction" can be found in St. Paul's epistles. K. K. Ruthven argues that the "legacy of Christian misogyny was consolidated by the so-called 'Fathers' of the Church, like Tertullian, who thought a woman was not only 'the gateway of the devil' but also 'a temple built over a sewer'". Jack Holland argues the concept of the fall of man is misogynistic as "a myth that blames woman for the ills and sufferings of mankind".

In the Middle Ages and the early modern period, Christian religious figures were involved in witch trials, which were generally held in order to punish assertive or independent women such as midwives since witchcraft was often not in evidence, or activists.

=== Animals ===
Historically, Kosher slaughter has been criticized by non-Jews who have alleged that it is inhumane and unsanitary, in part as an antisemitic canard which states that eating ritually slaughtered meat caused degeneration and in part out of an economic desire to remove Jews from the meat industry. Sometimes, these criticisms were directed at Judaism as a religion. In 1893, animal rights advocates who were campaigning against the practice of kosher slaughter in Aberdeen attempted to link cruelty to animals to Jewish religious practices. In the 1920s, Polish critics of kosher slaughter claimed that the practice actually had no basis in Scripture. To refute this argument, Jewish authorities stated that the slaughter methods are directly based upon Genesis IX:3 and they also stated that "these laws are binding on Jews today".

While supporters of kosher slaughter state that Judaism requires the practice precisely because it is considered humane, research which was conducted by Temple Grandin and Joe M. Regenstein in 1994 concluded that—practiced correctly with proper restraint systems—kosher slaughter "probably results in minimal discomfort" because the cattle stand still and do not resist a comfortable head restraint device. They also note that behavioral reactions to the incision which is made during kosher slaughter are weaker than behavioral reactions to noises such as clanging or hissing, inversion or pressure, which are made during restraint. Those who practice and subscribe to Jewish vegetarianism, both religiously and philosophically, disagree with this argument, they state that such a form of animal slaughter is not required while a number of them, including medieval scholars of Judaism such as Joseph Albo and Isaac Arama, regard vegetarianism as a moral ideal, not just out of a concern for animal welfare, but also out of concern for the slaughterer.

Other forms of ritual slaughter, such as Islamic ritual slaughter, have also come under controversy. Writing for PETA, Logan Scherer said that animals which are sacrificed according to Islamic law can not be stunned before they are killed. Muslims are only allowed to eat meat that has been prepared according to Sharia law and they say that the Islamic form of ritual slaughter is designed to reduce the amount of pain and distress that the animal suffers.

According to the Farm Animal Welfare Committee, halal and kosher practices should be banned because when animals are not stunned before they are slaughtered, they suffer a needless amount of pain for up to two minutes despite the fact that some Muslims and Jews argue that the loss of blood from the slash to the throat renders the animals unconscious relatively quickly. In 2018, Temple Grandin stated that kosher slaughter, no matter how well it is done, is not instantaneous, whereas stunning properly with a captive bolt is instantaneous.

=== Response to criticism of morality ===
Not all religions are hostile to homosexuality. Both Reform Judaism and the Unitarian Universalist Association have advocated for equal rights for gay and lesbian people since the 1970s. (Note: In 1970, the UUA passed a resolution calling for an end to anti-gay discrimination. The Union for Reform Judaism passed a similar resolution in 1977.) Hinduism does not view homosexuality as an issue.

Many Christians have made efforts toward establishing racial equality, contributing to the civil rights movement. The African American Review sees as important the role Christian revivalism in the black church played in the civil rights movement. Martin Luther King Jr., an ordained Baptist minister, was a leader of the American civil rights movement and president of the Southern Christian Leadership Conference, a Christian civil rights organization.

== Corrupt purposes of leaders ==
=== Dominionism ===
The term "dominionism" is often used to describe a political movement among fundamentalist Christians. Critics view dominionism as an attempt to improperly impose Christianity as the national faith of the United States. It emerged in the late 1980s inspired by the book, film and lecture series "Whatever Happened to the Human Race?" by Francis A. Schaeffer and C. Everett Koop. Schaeffer's views influenced conservatives like Jerry Falwell, Pat Robertson, Tim LaHaye, John W. Whitehead and although they represent different theological and political ideas, dominionists believe they have a Christian duty to take "control of a sinful secular society", either by putting fundamentalist Christians in office, or by introducing biblical law into the secular sphere. Social scientists have used the word "dominionism" to refer to adherence to dominion theology as well as to the influence in the broader Christian right of ideas inspired by dominion theology.

In the early 1990s, sociologist Sara Diamond and journalist Frederick Clarkson defined "dominionism" as a movement that while including dominion theology and Christian reconstructionism as subsets, it is much broader in scope, extending to much of the Christian right. Beginning in 2004 with essayist Katherine Yurica, a group of authors including journalist Chris Hedges, Marion Maddox, James Rudin, Sam Harris and the group TheocracyWatch, began applying the term to a broader spectrum of people than have sociologists such as Diamond.

==== Response to criticism of dominionism ====
The few full adherents to reconstructionism are limited to conservative Christians. The terms "dominionist" and "dominionism" are rarely used for self-description and their usage has been attacked from several quarters noting that the term is vague, unfairly links evangelicals to extremism, is highly exaggerated and are more akin to conservative smeer in the likes of a conspiracy theory. Kurtz also complained about a perceived link between average Christian evangelicals and extremism such as Christian reconstructionism.

== See also ==
- A Brief History of Disbelief – a three-part PBS series (2007)
- Anthropology of religion
- Antireligion
- Antitheism
- Apologetics
- Atheism
- Biblical inerrancy
- Religious violence
  - Christianity and violence
    - Mormonism and violence
  - Buddhism and violence
  - Islam and violence
    - Islamic terrorism
  - Judaism and violence
    - Jewish religious terrorism
    - Zionist political violence
- Cognitive dissonance
- Ethics without religion
- Folk religion
- "God is dead"
- Morality without religion
- Philosophy of religion
- Problem of evil
- Psychology of religion
- Religiosity and intelligence
- Religious satire
- Russell's teapot
- Sociology of religion
- Supernatural
- Toleration
- Theism
- True-believer syndrome

=== Criticism of specific religions and worldviews ===
- Biblical criticism
- Controversies about Opus Dei
- Criticism of Atheism
- Criticism of the Baháʼí Faith
- Criticism of Buddhism
- Criticism of Christianity
  - Criticism of the Catholic Church
  - Criticism of the Church of Jesus Christ of Latter-day Saints
    - Criticism of Mormon sacred texts
  - Criticism of Protestantism
  - Criticism of Jehovah's Witnesses
- Criticism of Hinduism
- Criticism of Islam
- Criticism of Jainism
- Criticism of Judaism
- Criticism of monotheism
- Criticism of Sikhism
- Scientology controversy
