= Criticism of monotheism =

Judgement of the ideas, validity, concept or practice of the belief in only one deity

Monotheism has attracted criticism throughout the history of the concept. Opponents of Akhenaten restored polytheism in ancient Egypt following his death. Although Abrahamic monotheism later achieved widespread prominence, critics have described monotheism as a cause of ignorance, narrow-mindedness, oppression, and violence. David Hume (1711–1776) wrote that monotheism is less pluralistic and thus less tolerant than polytheism, because monotheism stipulates that people pigeonhole their beliefs into one tenet. In the same vein, Auguste Comte said that "Monotheism is irreconcilable with the existence in our nature of the instincts of benevolence" because it compels followers to devote themselves to a single Creator. Mark S. Smith, an American biblical scholar and ancient historian, wrote that monotheism has been a "totalizing discourse", often co-opting all aspects of a social belief system, resulting in the exclusion of "others". Regina Schwartz portrays monotheism as an instigator of violence because (for example) it inspired the monotheistic Israelites to wage war upon the Canaanites who believed in multiple gods.

Other critics have associated monotheism with intolerance, patriarchal structures, moral rigidity, and violence. Figures such as Friedrich Nietzsche, James Lovelock, and Sarvepalli Radhakrishnan have argued that monotheistic belief can restrict imagination, suppress diversity, and justify aggression against those with differing worldviews.

== Perceived exclusivism in monotheism ==
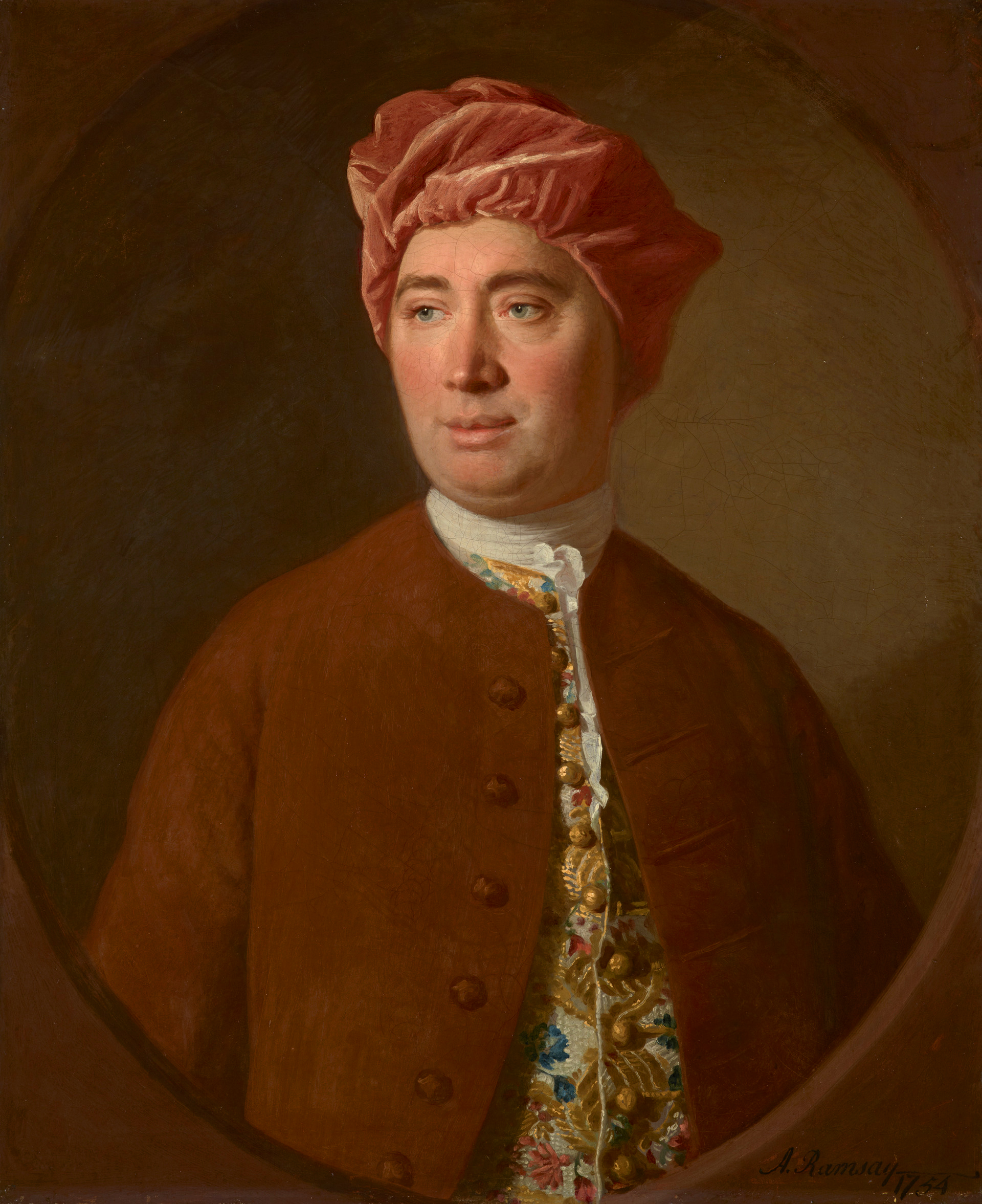
David Hume

David Hume (1711–1776) stated that monotheism is less pluralistic and thus less tolerant than polytheism, because monotheism stipulates that people pigeonhole their beliefs into one tenet. In the same vein, Auguste Comte (1798-1857) wrote: "Monotheism is irreconcilable with the existence in our nature of the instincts of benevolence" because it compels followers to devote themselves to a single Creator. Friedrich Nietzsche (1844-1900), who regarded monotheism as perhaps "the greatest danger that confronted humanity", pointed out the limiting nature of monotheism beyond any religious context as promoting "adherence to a single mode of behavior and belief as being exclusively desirable and correct".

Jacob Neusner (1932-2016) suggests that "the logic of monotheism ... yields little basis for tolerating other religions". Some authors voice a dissenting opinion, claiming that genuine tolerance and respect for the other are compatible with the discursive structure of informed monotheism.

James Lovelock (1919-2022) criticized monotheism due to its idea of a transcendent almighty father; he says about monotheism that it "seems to anesthetize the sense of wonder as if one were committed to a single line of thought by a cosmic legal contract". Mark S. Smith (1956- ), an American biblical scholar and ancient historian, currently teaching at the Princeton Theological Seminary, wrote that monotheism has been a "totalizing discourse", often co-opting all aspects of a social belief system, resulting in the exclusion of "others".

== Morality ==
Auguste Comte (1798-1857) likened monotheism of Western Europe in his time to polytheism of the past:

Monotheism in Western Europe is now as obsolete and as injurious as Polytheism was fifteen centuries ago. The discipline in which its moral value principally consisted has long since decayed; and consequently the sole effect of its doctrine, which has been so extravagantly praised, is to degrade the affections by unlimited desires, and to weaken the character by servile terrors. It supplied no field for the imagination, and forced it back upon Polytheism and Fetichism, which, under Theology, form the only possible foundation for poetry. The pursuits of practical life were never sincerely promoted by it, and they advanced only by evading or resisting its influence.

Some feminist thinkers have criticized the monotheistic concept as the model of the highest form of patriarchal power. They say that the one god regarded as male, opposes everything related to change, sensuality, nature, feeling, and femininity.

== Associations with violence ==
Ancient monotheism is described as the instigator of violence in its early days because it inspired the Israelites to wage war upon the Canaanites who believed in multiple gods.

Sarvepalli Radhakrishnan regarded monotheism as a cause of violence, saying:

The intolerance of narrow monotheism is written in letters of blood across the history of man from the time when first the tribes of Israel burst into the land of Canaan. The worshippers of the one jealous God are egged on to aggressive wars against people of alien [beliefs and cultures]. They invoke divine sanction for the cruelties inflicted on the conquered. The spirit of old Israel is inherited by Christianity and Islam, and it might not be unreasonable to suggest that it would have been better for Western civilization if Greece had moulded it on this question rather than Palestine.

== See also ==
- Criticism of religion
