= God, A Guide for the Perplexed =

2002 book by Keith Ward

God, A Guide for the Perplexed is a non-fiction book by Keith Ward arguing the compatibility between science and religion.

In seven chapters Keith Ward takes the reader through the history of mankind's religious thought. He shows how philosophical questions have always been linked with religious questions, and how religion has never been merely a set of rules or doctrines, but a quest for meaning and a search for the blazing darkness that is God. Ward also discusses Hegel and Karl Marx. While the academic ground is covered lightly, the mystical, poetic and mysterious side of religion is also given due weight. The content is similar to, though the tone adopted is different from, Don Cupitt's The Sea of Faith.

== Editions ==
- Ward, K. (2002). God: A guide for the perplexed. Oneworld. ISBN 978-1-85168-284-3.
- Ward, K. (2013). God: A guide for the perplexed. Oneworld. ISBN 978-1-78074-122-2.
