= David Berlinski =

American mathematician and philosopher (born 1942)

- Born: 1942 (age 83–84); New York City, U.S.
- Education: Columbia University (BA); Princeton University (PhD)
- Occupation: Author
- Known for: A Tour of the Calculus (1995)
- Spouse: Toby Saks
- Children: Claire Berlinski (daughter); Mischa Berlinski (son)
- Father: Herman Berlinski
- Scientific career
- Fields: Systems analysis Analytical philosophy
- Workplaces: Stanford University
- Thesis: The Well-tempered Wittgenstein (1968)
- Doctoral advisor: George Pitcher
- Website: www.davidberlinski.org

David Berlinski (born 1942) is an American mathematician and philosopher. He has written books about mathematics and the history of science as well as fiction. He is a senior fellow of the Discovery Institute's Center for Science and Culture, an organization that promotes the pseudoscientific idea of intelligent design.

== Early life and education ==
David Berlinski was born in the United States in 1942 to German-born Jewish refugees who had fled to New York City from France, where the Vichy government was collaborating with Nazi Germany. His father was composer Herman Berlinski and his mother was musician Sina Berlinski (née Goldfein), who was a pianist, piano teacher and voice coach. Both of his parents were born and raised in Leipzig, where they studied at the University of Music and Theatre Leipzig before escaping to Paris, where they married and pursued further studies. German was David Berlinski's first spoken language.

Berlinski graduated from Columbia University with a Bachelor of Arts degree. He then earned his Ph.D. in philosophy from Princeton University in 1968. His doctoral dissertation was titled, "The Well-tempered Wittgenstein". His doctoral advisor at Princeton was the philosopher George Pitcher.

== Academic career ==
After obtaining his doctorate, Berlinski was a research assistant in biology at Columbia University. He also completed a postdoctoral fellowship at Columbia in mathematics and molecular biology.

Berlinski is a senior fellow of the Discovery Institute's Center for Science and Culture, a Seattle-based think tank that promotes the idea of intelligent design, a pseudoscientific form of creationism. Berlinski shares the movement's rejection of the evidence for evolution, but he disavows belief in intelligent design, or in any other explanation for the origin of life.

== Author ==
=== Mathematics and biology ===
Berlinski has written works on systems analysis, the history of differential topology, analytic philosophy, and the philosophy of mathematics. Berlinski has authored books for the general public on mathematics and the history of mathematics. These include A Tour of the Calculus (1995) on calculus, The Advent of the Algorithm (2000) on algorithms, Newton's Gift (2000) on Isaac Newton, and Infinite Ascent: A Short History of Mathematics (2005). Another book, The Secrets of the Vaulted Sky (2003), aimed to redeem astrology as "rationalistic"; Publishers Weekly described the book as offering "self-consciously literary vignettes ... ostentatious erudition and metaphysical pseudo-profundities". In Black Mischief (1988), Berlinski wrote "Our paper became a monograph. When we had completed the details, we rewrote everything so that no one could tell how we came upon our ideas or why. This is the standard in mathematics."

Berlinski's books have received mixed reviews. Newton's Gift, The King of Infinite Space and The Advent of the Algorithm were criticized on MathSciNet for containing historical and mathematical inaccuracies. The Mathematical Association of America review of A Tour of the Calculus by Fernando Q. Gouvêa recommended that professors have students read the book to appreciate the overarching historical and philosophical picture of calculus. Journalist Ron Rosenbaum described the book in Observer as "an eloquent and elegant tribute to the beauty and power of mathematics". Ad Meskins, writing in The Mathematical Gazette, criticized it for inaccuracy and lack of clarity: "I haven't learned anything from [Berlinski's] book except that the novel of mathematics is best written in another style." A review in the Notices of the AMS found that Berlinski's metaphor-heavy prose made his "tour" of calculus like a trip along the Amazon River, isolated in an air-conditioned boat with tour guides who are "chatty and slightly manic, willing to invent a bit when certain knowledge runs out."

==== Collaborations ====
Berlinski, along with fellow Discovery Institute associates Michael Behe and William A. Dembski, tutored Ann Coulter on science and evolution for her book Godless: The Church of Liberalism (2006).

Berlinski was a longtime friend of Marcel-Paul Schützenberger (1920–1996), with whom he collaborated on an unfinished and unpublished mathematically based manuscript that he described as being "devoted to the Darwinian theory of evolution". Berlinski dedicated The Advent of the Algorithm to Schützenberger.

=== Fiction ===
He is the author of several detective novels featuring private investigator Aaron Asherfeld: A Clean Sweep (1993), Less Than Meets the Eye (1994) and The Body Shop (1996), and a number of shorter works of fiction and non-fiction.

== Personal life ==
Berlinski's daughter Claire Berlinski is a journalist and his son Mischa Berlinski is a writer.

== Bibliography ==
=== Non-fiction books ===
- Berlinski, David (1968). The Well-tempered Wittgenstein (Thesis (PhD)). Princeton, NJ: Princeton University. OCLC 54749918.
- —— (1976). On Systems Analysis: An Essay Concerning the Limitations of Some Mathematical Methods in the Social, Political, and Biological Sciences. Cambridge, MA: MIT Press. ISBN 978-0-262-02120-3. LCCN 76013444. OCLC 2213153.
- —— (1976). Philosophy: The Cutting Edge. Port Washington, NY: Alfred Publishing Co. ISBN 978-0-882-84029-1. LCCN 76007548. OCLC 2089782.
- —— (1978). "Adverse Notes on Systems Theory". In Klir, George J (ed.). Applied General Systems Research: Recent Developments and Trends. NATO Conference Series. Vol. 5. New York: Plenum Press. pp. 949–960. doi:10.1007/978-1-4757-0555-3_72. ISBN 978-0-306-32845-9. LCCN 77026044. OCLC 470761024. "Proceedings of the NATO international conference held in Binghamton, New York, August 15–19, 1977, sponsored by the NATO Special Program Panel on Systems Science."
- —— (1986). Black Mischief: The Mechanics of Modern Science (1st ed.). New York: William Morrow and Company. ISBN 978-0-688-04404-6. LCCN 85021820. OCLC 12721232.
  - —— (1988). Black Mischief: Language, Life, Logic, Luck (2nd ed.). Boston: Harcourt Brace Jovanovich. ISBN 978-0-156-13063-9. LCCN 87022695. OCLC 16680895.
- —— (1986). "The Language of Life". In Casti, John L.; Karlqvist, Anders (eds.). Complexity, Language, and Life: Mathematical Approaches. Biomathematics. Vol. 16. Berlin; New York: Springer-Verlag. pp. 231–267. doi:10.1007/978-3-642-70953-1_9. ISBN 978-3-642-70955-5. ISSN 0067-8821. LCCN 85030324. OCLC 13010820.
- ——, ed. (1989). A Guide to the Compositions of Herman Berlinski. New York: Herman Berlinski Collection (Jewish Theological Seminary of America). OCLC 417235152. Archived from the original on August 3, 2010.
- —— (1990). The Rise of Differential Topology. Boston, MA: Birkhäuser. ISBN 978-3-764-33073-6. OCLC 123046016.
- —— (1995). A Tour of the Calculus (1st ed.). New York: Pantheon Books. ISBN 978-0-679-42645-5. LCCN 95004042. OCLC 31970193.
- —— (1997). "Prague Interlude". In O'Reilly, Sean; O'Reilly, James; O'Reilly, Tim (eds.). Travelers' Tales: The Road Within: True Stories of Transformation (1st ed.). San Francisco, CA: Travelers' Tales, Inc. ISBN 978-1-8852-11-19-4. OCLC 38049772.
- —— (1998). "Gödel's Question". In Dembski, William A (ed.). Mere Creation: Science, Faith & Intelligent Design. Foreword by Henry F. Schaefer, III. Downers Grove, IL: InterVarsity Press. ISBN 978-0-8308-1515-9. LCCN 98020999. OCLC 38959771.
- —— (1999). "Joseph Maier: A Personal Reminiscence". In Marcus, Judith T (ed.). Surviving the Twentieth Century: Social Philosophy from the Frankfurt School to the Columbia Faculty Seminars. New Brunswick, NJ: Transaction Publishers. ISBN 978-1-56000-352-6. LCCN 99016173. OCLC 41445653.
- —— (2000). The Advent of the Algorithm: The Idea that Rules the World. New York: Harcourt. ISBN 978-0-15-100338-9. LCCN 98043755. OCLC 40459999.
  - —— (2001) [Originally published 2000 with different subtitle]. The Advent of the Algorithm: The 300-Year Journey from an Idea to the Computer (1st Harvest ed.). San Diego, CA: Harcourt. ISBN 978-0-15-601391-8. OCLC 46890682.
- —— (2000). Newton's Gift: How Sir Isaac Newton Unlocked the System of the World. New York: Free Press. ISBN 978-0-684-84392-6. LCCN 00034724. OCLC 44046921.
- —— (2003). "The Mathematics of Matter and the Mathematics of Mind". In Maler, Oded; Pnueli, Amir (eds.). Hybrid Systems: Computation and Control: 6th International Workshop, HSCC 2003, Prague, Czech Republic, April 2003: Proceedings. Hybrid Systems: Computation and Control. Lecture Notes in Computer Science, 2623. Berlin; New York: Springer-Verlag. p. 1. ISBN 3-540-0-0913-2. LCCN 2003045461. OCLC 51855533.
- —— (2003). The Secrets of the Vaulted Sky: Astrology and the Art of Prediction (1st U.S. ed.). Orlando, FL: Harcourt. ISBN 978-0-15-100527-7. LCCN 2003009789. OCLC 52214462.
- —— (2005). Infinite Ascent: A Short History of Mathematics. Modern Library Chronicles (1st ed.). New York: Modern Library. ISBN 978-0-679-64234-3. LCCN 2005041519. OCLC 57573840.
- —— (2006). "Two Fables by Jorge Luis Borges". In Dembski, William A (ed.). Darwin's Nemesis: Phillip Johnson and the Intelligent Design Movement. Foreword by Rick Santorum. Downers Grove, IL: IVP Academic. ISBN 978-0-8308-2836-4. LCCN 2005033144. OCLC 62330745.
- —— (2008). The Devil's Delusion: Atheism and Its Scientific Pretensions (1st ed.). New York: Crown Forum. ISBN 978-0-307-39626-6. LCCN 2007048071. OCLC 183162134.
  - —— (2009). The Devil's Delusion: Atheism and Its Scientific Pretensions (2nd ed.). New York: Basic Books. ISBN 978-0-465-01937-3. LCCN 2009931847. OCLC 401147024.
- —— (2009). Klinghoffer, David (ed.). The Deniable Darwin and Other Essays. Seattle, WA: Discovery Institute Press. ISBN 978-0-979-01412-3. LCCN 2009935347. OCLC 624322270.
- —— (2011). One, Two, Three: Absolutely Elementary Mathematics (1st ed.). New York: Pantheon Books. ISBN 978-0-375-42333-8. LCCN 2010038555. OCLC 657595353.
- —— (2013). The King of Infinite Space: Euclid and His Elements. New York: Basic Books. ISBN 978-0-465-01481-1. LCCN 2012042492. OCLC 828850721.

=== Fiction books ===
- Berlinski, David (1993). A Clean Sweep (1st ed.). New York: St. Martin's Press. ISBN 978-0-312-08744-9. LCCN 92036534. OCLC 26764139.
- —— (1994). Less Than Meets the Eye: An Aaron Asherfeld Mystery (1st ed.). New York: St. Martin's Press. ISBN 978-0-312-11298-1. LCCN 93045281. OCLC 29470294.
- —— (1996). The Body Shop: An Aaron Asherfeld Mystery (1st ed.). New York: St. Martin's Press. ISBN 978-0-312-13935-3. LCCN 95046783. OCLC 33439024.

=== Articles in peer-reviewed journals ===
- Berlinski, David; Gallin, Daniel (May 1969). "Quine's Definition of Logical Truth". Noûs. 3 (2): 111–128. doi:10.2307/2216260. JSTOR 2216260.
- —— (September 1970). "Systems Analysis". Urban Affairs Review. 6 (1): 104–126. doi:10.1177/107808747000600111. ISSN 1078-0874. S2CID 220929288.
- —— (June 15, 1972). "Philosophical Aspects of Molecular Biology". The Journal of Philosophy. 69 (12): 319–335. doi:10.2307/2024776. ISSN 0022-362X. JSTOR 2024776. OCLC 244821401.
- —— (December 1974). "The Philosophy of Biology by Michael Ruse". Philosophy of Science (Book review). 41 (4): 418–422. doi:10.1086/288605. ISSN 0031-8248. JSTOR 187011. OCLC 716512499.
- Berlinski, David (August 1975). "Mathematical models of the world". Synthese. Part 1. 31 (2): 211–227. doi:10.1007/BF00485978. ISSN 0039-7857. OCLC 4895060169. S2CID 46955447. Part 2 and part 3 published in Synthese, 36 (3) (November 1977), and 37 (2) (February 1978), respectively (OCLC 226993726).
- —— (December 1976). "Russell and Moore: The Analytical Heritage by A. J. Ayer". American Political Science Review (Book review). 70 (4): 1257. doi:10.2307/1959389. ISSN 1537-5943. JSTOR 1959389. S2CID 148205333.
- —— (March 1977). "The Cybernetic Theory of Decision by John D. Steinbruner; The Sciences of the Artificial by H. A. Simon". American Political Science Review (Book review). 71 (1): 424–428. doi:10.2307/1957077. ISSN 1537-5943. JSTOR 1957077. OCLC 805068983. S2CID 147139805.
- —— (1978). "Catastrophe theory and its applications: A critical review". Systems Research and Behavioral Science (Book review). 23 (4): 402–416. doi:10.1002/bs.3830230411.
- —— (October–December 1980). "Kurt Gödel (1906-1978)". Revue de métaphysique et de morale. 85 (4): 509–518. ISSN 0035-1571. JSTOR 40902196. OCLC 763653542.
- —— (1990). "Knowing, Knowledge, Known". Logique et Analyse. 33 (129–130): 3–20. ISSN 0024-5836. OCLC 1756092.

=== Articles in journals and newspapers ===
- —— (Winter 1989). "Vienna". New England Review & Bread Loaf Quarterly. 12 (2): 157–168. ISSN 1053-1297. JSTOR 40237243.
- —— (January 1996). "The Soul of Man Under Physics". Commentary. ISSN 0010-2601. Archived from the original (PDF) on February 2, 2014.
- —— (June 1996). "The Deniable Darwin". Commentary. ISSN 0010-2601.
- —— (November 2, 1996). "Keeping an Eye on Evolution: Richard Dawkins, a relentless Darwinian spear carrier, trips over Mount Improbable". The Globe and Mail (Book review). Toronto, Ontario: The Globe and Mail Inc.
- —— (December 2, 1996). "The End of Materialistic Science". Forbes ASAP: 146–160. ISSN 1078-9901. LCCN 94648579.
- —— (July–August 1997). "Ground Zero: A Review of The Pleasures of Counting, by TW Koerner". The Sciences (Book review). 37 (4): 37–41. doi:10.1002/j.2326-1951.1997.tb03326.x. ISSN 0036-861X.
- —— (February 1998). "Was There a Big Bang?". Commentary. ISSN 0010-2601. Archived from the original (PDF) on February 2, 2014.
- —— (April 2001). "What Brings a World into Being?". Commentary. ISSN 0010-2601.
- —— (November 26, 2001). "Where Physics and Politics Meet". The Weekly Standard (Book review). 7 (11). ISSN 1083-3013. OCLC 32775365. Archived from the original on November 24, 2001.
- —— (February 18, 2002). "God, Man, and Physics". The Weekly Standard (Book review). 7 (22). ISSN 1083-3013. OCLC 32775365.
- —— (March 2002). "Einstein and Gödel". Discover. 23 (3): 38. ISSN 0274-7529.
- —— (March 18, 2002). "Lucky Jim". The Weekly Standard (Book review). 7 (26). ISSN 1083-3013. OCLC 32775365.
- —— (Fall 2002). "Inventing Numbers: How Mathematicians Filled the Inky Void" (PDF). American Educator. 26 (3): 36–41. ISSN 0148-432X. Archived from the original (PDF) on December 17, 2013.
- —— (December 2002). "Has Darwin Met His Match?". Commentary. ISSN 0010-2601.
- —— (April 2003). "A Scientific Scandal". Commentary. ISSN 0010-2601.
- —— (November 2004). "On the Origins of the Mind" (PDF). Commentary. ISSN 0010-2601.
- —— (March 9, 2005). "There are valid criticisms of evolution". The Wichita Eagle. Archived from the original on March 21, 2005.
- —— (April 1, 2005). "Academic Extinction". The Daily Californian. OCLC 60637422. Archived from the original on March 4, 2016.
- —— (February 2006). "On the Origins of Life". Commentary. ISSN 0010-2601.
- —— (August 29, 2007). "Inside the Mathematical Mind". The New York Sun (Book review). TWO SL LLC. Archived from the original on February 1, 2014.
- —— (May 5, 2008). "The Dang Thing". National Review Online. OCLC 45278115.
- —— (April 18, 2008). "Connecting Hitler and Darwin". Human Events. Archived from the original on November 14, 2013.
- —— (April 2008) [Published 2008 in chapter 8 of The Devil's Delusion: Atheism and Its Scientific Pretensions as "Our Inner Ape, a Darling, and the Human Mind"]. "The God of the Gaps". Commentary. ISSN 0010-2601.
