= Regina Schwartz =

- Education: Indiana University

Regina Schwartz is a scholar of English literature and elements of Jewish and Christian religion. A professor of English and religion at Northwestern University, she is known for her research and teaching on 17th-century literature (e.g., John Milton and William Shakespeare), on the Hebrew Bible, and on the interface of literature with the subjects of philosophy, law, and religion.

== Training and career ==
After completing her B.A. (1975) and M.A. (1978), both at Indiana University Bloomington, Schwartz earned a Ph.D. in English (1984) from the University of Virginia. She also taught at Duke University and the University of Colorado before moving to Northwestern. She has also taught at the University of Pisa and Northwestern University's Law School. Schwartz was the Visiting Tipton Distinguished Chair of Religion at University of California, Santa Barbara in 2015.

== Written work and recognition ==
Schwartz won the James Holly Hanford Award from the Milton Society of America for that year's "distinguished... critical monograph" for her 1988 work on Milton, Remembering and Repeating: Biblical Creation in Paradise Lost. She followed this work by The Book and the Text: The Bible and Literary Theory in 1990, Desire in the Renaissance: Psychoanalysis and Literature in 1994, and The Postmodern Bible in 1995. Her 1997 work, The Curse of Cain: The Violent Legacy of Monotheism, described by the Episcopal News service as "a study of monotheism, national identity, and violence in the Hebrew Bible", was lauded as a "stunningly important book" by Walter Brueggemann in Theology Today and was nominated for a Pulitzer Prize.

Her 2007 book, Sacramental Poetics at the Dawn of Secularism: When God Left the World on "the Eucharist in Renaissance literature" was published as a part of the Stanford University series, "Cultural Memory in the Present". The monograph has been called a "tour de force", and "one of the most important studies of our critical moment."

Schwartz's scholarship includes further published essays:

- on postmodern theology, in Post-secular Philosophy, Questioning God, and Transcendence;
- on Milton and Renaissance literature, in The Blackwell Companion to Milton, and The Oxford Handbook of Milton; and
- on Shakespeare and law, in Triquarterly.

== Appearances and other work ==
Schwartz gave the paper, “Questioning Narratives of God”, at the second “Religion and Postmodernism” conference in October 1999 at Villanova University in northwest suburban Philadelphia, Pennsylvania, a conference that featured Jacques Derrida; her ideas, which appeared subsequently in the conference proceedings, "explore[d] her suspicion surrounding the adequacy of narratives about God... [where she] suggest[ed] that as important as narrative is, we must recognize that it, like visual representation, is a form of idolatry."

She has subsequently been a featured speaker at:

- the Adelaide Festival of Ideas in 2001, on issues related to sustainability and the environment, in the session "The 21st Century: How much water, how many people?";
- the Carnegie Council on Ethics and International Affairs;
- The Castelli Colloquium in Rome;
- the University of Lugano, on free speech;
- Notre Dame University, on human rights.

Schwartz was the 2014 Respondent to the Tanner Lectures given by Rowan Williams, the 104th Archbishop of Canterbury, at Harvard University.

Schwartz wrote the libretto for composer John Eaton's opera, Paradise Lost based on Milton, and the separate stage adaptation, "John Milton's Paradise Lost", performed in May, 2010 by the Chicago Shakespeare Project.

== Organizational leadership positions ==
Schwartz has served as:

- Chair of Northwestern University's Interdisciplinary Hiring Initiative in the Humanities;
- Chair of the Religion and Literature Division of the Modern Language Association;
- President of the Milton Society of America;
- Director of the Milton Project that honoured the 400th birthday of John Milton;
- Co-Director of the Milton Seminar at the Newberry Library; and as
- Co-Director of the "Academy for the Advanced Study of the Renaissance".

== Research and publications ==
Schwartz's research has been supported by the National Endowment for the Humanities, the Rockefeller Foundation, the MacArthur Foundation, and the University of Virginia's Institute for the Advanced Study of Culture.

=== Sole author works ===
- Crediting God: Sovereignty and Religion in the Age of Global Capitalism (2022)
- Loving Justice, Living Shakespeare (Oxford University Press, 2017)
- Love and Forgiveness for a More Just World Columbia University Press (2015)
- Remembering and Repeating: Biblical Creation in Paradise Lost (2011)
- Sacramental Poetics at the Dawn of Secularism: When God Left the World (Stanford University Press, 2008)
- Transcendence: Philosophy, Literature, and Theology Approach the Beyond (2004)
- The Curse of Cain: The Violent Legacy of Monotheism (University of Chicago Press, 1998)
- The Postmodern Bible (Yale University Press, 1995)
- Remembering and Repeating: Biblical Creation in Paradise Lost (Cambridge University Press, 1989)

=== Edited works ===
- Transcendence: Philosophy, Literature, and Theology Approach the Beyond (Routledge, 2004)
- With Valeria Finucci, Desire in the Renaissance: Psychoanalysis and Literature (Princeton University Press, 1994)
- The Book and the Text: The Bible and Literary Theory (Basil Blackwell, 1990)
- Approaches to Teaching Milton’s Paradise Lost: second edition (Approaches to Teaching World Literature Book 122) (2012)
- Toward a Sacramental Poetics with Patrick J. McGrath (2012)
