= The Devil's Delusion =

2008 book by David Berlinski

- The Devil's Delusion
- Author: David Berlinski
- Audio read by: Dennis Holland
- Language: English
- Subjects: Atheism; Religion
- Publisher: Crown Forum
- Publication date: April 1, 2008
- Publication place: United States
- Media type: Print (Hardcover, Paperback) and Audiobook
- Pages: 256
- ISBN: 978-0307396266
- OCLC: 401147024
- Website: davidberlinski.org/books/the-devils-delusion/

The Devil's Delusion: Atheism and Its Scientific Pretensions is a 2008 book by David Berlinski. It discusses atheism and religion, defending the religious point of view.

== Summary ==
Berlinski expresses skepticism towards some of the core tenets of Darwin's ideas. Using mathematical and stochastic principles, Berlinski mounts a series of arguments to challenge the Darwinian explanation of life, and suggests that evolution as a fundamental organising principle is flawed.

== Reception ==
A review stated: "Berlinski's biography and book raises at least two questions: first, given the book's powerful arguments in favor of religious belief, why is the author not religious? And second, given that the author is not religious, doesn't this spirited defense of religion deserve an honest hearing?"

Writing in Touchstone magazine, Matthew Dowling said: "The Devil's Delusion is appropriate for the pastor and scholar, and for all those who are interested in an academic's response to the New Atheism. Berlinski's writing is well informed, pointed, and highly entertaining."

== Sources ==
- Dowling, Matthew (March 2013). "Diabolical Science". Touchstone: A Journal of Mere Christianity. Fellowship of St. James. pp. 52f.
- Weitnauer, Carson (10 September 2012). "The Devil's Delusion by David Berlinski – A Book Review". Reasons for God.
