= George Pitcher (philosopher) =

American philosopher (1925–2018)

George Willard Pitcher (May 19, 1925 – January 12, 2018) was an American philosopher. He was a professor of philosophy at Princeton University from 1956 to 1982.

He was an expert on the work of George Berkeley and Ludwig Wittgenstein.

== Early life and education ==
George Willard Pitcher was born in West Orange, New Jersey.

Pitcher graduated from the United States Naval Academy in 1947 with a BS in electrical engineering. After graduating, he served in the Navy for three years in the Atlantic, the Caribbean, and the Mediterranean. He went on to do graduate work at Harvard University, which he temporarily left during the Korean War when he was recalled to active duty. He returned to Harvard after his service. In the 1955–56 academic year, he spent the year at Magdalen College, Oxford on a traveling fellowship where he studied under J.L. Austin. He earned his PhD in 1957. His PhD thesis was titled Illocutionary acts: an analysis of language in terms of human acts.

== Career ==
In 1956, Pitcher joined the Department of Philosophy at Princeton University as a faculty member. He served as acting chair and associate chair of the philosophy department for many years. He taught there until his retirement in 1982. While an emeritus professor, Pitcher continued to publish papers for several years.

== Personal life ==
Pitcher and Edward T. Cone, a composer and fellow Princeton professor, were companions for nearly 48 years, until Cone's death in 2004.

Pitcher and Cone adopted a stray pregnant dog that they found in their garden shed which they later named Lupa. They kept one of the puppies from Lupa’s litter, which they named Remus, and gave the other puppies away. The two dogs were taken by Pitcher and Cone everywhere, including on a trip to France aboard the Queen Elizabeth 2. Pitcher wrote a book about his and Cone’s life with the dogs titled The Dogs Who Came to Stay.

From 1992 until his death, Pitcher was a trustee of the Edward T. Cone Foundation, which supports educational and cultural institutions.

== Awards and honors ==
Pitcher received a 1965–66 Guggenheim fellowship and was a member of the American Philosophical Association.

== Publications ==
=== Books ===
- The Philosophy of Wittgenstein (Prentice-Hall, 1964)
- Theory of Perception (Princeton University Press, 1971)
- A Life of Grace: The Biography of Grace Lansing Lambert (Princeton University Press, 1987)
- The Dogs Who Came to Stay (Penguin Publishing Group, 1996)

=== Journal articles ===
- "Wittgenstein, Nonsense, and Lewis Carroll", The Massachusetts Review, Vol. 6, No. 3 (Spring-Summer, 1965), pp. 591–611.
- The Misfortunes of the Dead, American Philosophical Quarterly 21/2 (1984): 183–188.

=== Editor ===
- Truth (Contemporary Perspectives in Philosophy Series (Prentice Hall, 1964)
- Ryle; a Collection of Critical Essays with Oscar P. Wood (Macmillan, 1970)
- Wittgenstein: The Philosophical Investigations (University of Notre Dame Press, 1974)
- Berkeley: The Arguments of the Philosophers (Routledge, 1977)
