= Is Religion Dangerous? =

2006 book by Keith Ward

- Author: Keith Ward
- Language: English
- Publication date: September 1, 2006
- Publication place: United Kingdom
- ISBN: 978-0-7459-5262-8

Is Religion Dangerous? is a book by Keith Ward examining the questions: "Is religion dangerous? Does it do more harm than good? Is it a force for evil?" It was first published in 2006. Looking at the evidence from history, philosophy, sociology and psychology, Ward focuses on the main question at issue: does religion do more harm than good? He begins by examining the key area of religion and violence and goes on to assess the allegations of irrationality and immorality, before exploring the good religion has done over the centuries. He suggests that without religion the human race would be considerably worse off and there would be little hope for the future.

== Summary ==
In the Introduction: What is religion?, Ward begins, "Is religion dangerous? Does it do more harm than good? Is it a force for evil, even 'the root of all evil'?"—the title of a short British television series presented by Richard Dawkins. Ward states his view that the assertion that religion does more harm than good ignores "the available evidence from history, from psychology and sociology, and from philosophy" and suggests that proponents of this view "refuse to investigate the question in a properly rigorous way, and substitute rhetoric for analysis". He suggests that it is impossible to give a satisfactory universal definition of religion, and that early opponents of religion such as Edward Taylor, James Frazer and Émile Durkheim were indulging in "scholarly fantazising" about forms of primitive religion which were refuted by more rigorous studies such as Theories of Primitive Religion by Evans-Pritchard. "Unfortunately some writers have not yet realised this", such as Daniel Dennett in Breaking the Spell, who "does not seem to realise that the spell was broken as long ago as 1884 when E. B. Tylor was appointed to a Readership in Anthropology at Oxford University."

In Chapters 1 through 3, which deal with the origins and nature of violence, Ward suggests that "It is not religion that causes intolerance. It is intolerance that uses religion", that "The leaders of such movements [are] using moral and religious language as a cloak for evil and irreligious ends", and that "religions are not the causes of evil, but they do naturally share in the general moral state of the societies in which they exist". Ward suggests that any organised human activity can be corrupted, and that the corruptions of religion, although highly regrettable, are less harmful that the corruptions of secular ideologies (Nazism, Leninism and Maoism all claimed the support of science). In addition the great religions have within themselves a powerful critique of corruption. Ward, alluding to Islamic terrorism, alleges that "it is not religion that causes Islamic terrorism. It is a version of Islam that has been corrupted by ...Marxist-Leninism" and that al-Qaeda is based on a demonstrably incorrect interpretation of Islam. He further suggests that wars fought in the name of some interpretations of Christianity have also been based on distortions.

Ward examines the interplay of reason, morality, and philosophy in Chapters 4 through 8. He claims that the statement "the only reasonable beliefs are those that can be confirmed by the methods of science, by public observation, measurement and experiment" is self-refuting. He contrasts four worldviews—Common Sense, Materialism, Idealism and Christian Theism—and suggests that there are serious problems with Common Sense (science shows that things are often not in fact as they seem at all) and Materialism ("quantum physics seems to dissolve matter entirely", and "consciousness and the contents of consciousness resist translation into purely physical terms... and if ... truth, beauty and goodness ... are things that really exist ... then Materialism will not match our experience at all"). He suggests that "many attacks on religion are based on the belief that idealism is false. There is no spiritual dimension to reality... to make matters worse, thinkers like Richard Dawkins hold that...religious views are based on 'blind faith'". But, he asks, "Has Dawkins never read any philosophy?... Does he really think that Descartes, Leibniz, Spinoza, Kant and Hegel were all unthinking simpletons?" "Looking around my philosopher colleagues in Britain, virtually all of whom I know at least from their published work, I would say that very few of them are materialists... the point is that religious views are underpinned by highly sophisticated philosophical arguments". He discusses the defensibility of worldviews and suggests some criteria that make a worldview reasonable:

1. Clarity and precision in stating the beliefs, ideally arranged in order of logical dependence so that one can tell which are the truly basic beliefs
2. Comparison with other worldviews
3. Testing the adequacy of the worldview to the widest range of data, whether they are experiences or other beliefs

Ward asserts that it is rational, and not harmful, to believe in life after death. He advises that "even for the most conservative Christian, moral rules found in the Bible should not be taken out of context" and that "far from being considered dangerous, religious morality is widely considered to be a valuable resource for moral thinking in the modern world". He explains how his own journey from atheism, when he was a philosopher teaching at Glasgow University, was strongly influenced by the need to have a philosophically coherent justification for morality. Ward avers that the history of Europe from the 16th to the 20th Centuries was not one of "beneficial liberation from fear and superstition" but "an age of increasingly aggressive nationalism culminating in two world wars ... barbarism did not decrease. In the twentieth century it reached heights never previously imagined" and that religiously inspired individuals took a leading role in many beneficial developments. He suggests that "it was religion, and not secular thought, that propounded the view that nature is founded on a deep rationality", and defends liberalism and pluralism in religious thought, which he attributes to the rise of Protestantism and contrasts with what he considers the illiberal attitudes of Richard Dawkins and Enlightenment thinkers like David Hume, who sought to make reason the slave of passions.

In Chapters 9 and 10, Ward attempts to demonstrate the benefits of religion. Ward quotes data from David Myers citing surveys by Gallup, the National Opinion Research Centre, and the Pew Organisation which conclude that spiritually committed people are twice as likely to report being "very happy" than the least religiously committed people. He reports an analysis of over 200 social studies that "high religiousness predicts a rather lower risk of depression and drug abuse and fewer suicide attempts, and more reports of satisfaction with life and a sense of well-being", and a review of 498 studies published in peer-reviewed journals that "concluded that a large majority of these studies showed a positive correlation between religious commitment and higher levels of perceived well-being and self-esteem, and lower levels of hypertension, depression and clinical delinquency, and similar results from the Handbook of Religion and Mental Health. He cites surveys suggesting a strong link between faith and altruism. He cites extensive studies to show that there is little or no evidence that religion ever causes mental disorders, and that overall religion is a positive contributor to mental health.

He specifically addresses and rebuts the claim that religious belief is a delusion. He quotes the definition in the Oxford Companion to Mind as "a fixed, idiosyncratic belief, unusual in the culture to which the person belongs" suggesting that "most great philosophers have believed in God", and that the many religious people who exhibit a high degree of rational ability "... and who can produce a reasonable and coherent defense of their beliefs" refute the idea that belief in God is a delusion—whether or not it may be mistaken. He also analyses and rejects the idea that faith is a brain malfunction, quoting Gerald Edelman: "The evolutionary assumption [that consciousness conferred fitness]... implies that consciousness is efficacious - that is, it is not an epiphenomenon", and suggests that, if consciousness can apprehend truth and cause action, so can faith. Ward suggests that, although harm has been done in the name of religion, the same is true of politics and science, that religion can "be used to inspire heroic love and commitment. The world would be much poorer without Martin Luther King, Gandhi, Mother Teresa... Bach ... St Francis, Siddartha Gautama, Jesus". He cites many positive contributions made by Judaism, Christianity (he cites in particular founding hospitals, hospices, schools and universities, great works of art, the investigation into the world as the creation of one wise and rational God that gave birth to modern science, the Truth and reconciliation commission, and the Red Cross) and Islam, and suggests that "there is plenty of room for common social action in mercy and hospitality between Christians and Muslims, and it is imperative that such commonalities are promoted". He concludes by stating that Religion "is the compassionate heart of what might otherwise seem to be a cold and heartless world".

== Reviews ==
- Richard Holloway in The Scotsman
- The Good Bookstall review

== Sources ==
- Ward, Keith (2006-09-01). Is Religion Dangerous?. London: Lion Hudson Plc. ISBN 978-0-7459-5262-8.
- Ward, Keith (2007-03-01). Is Religion Dangerous?. Grand Rapids, MI, USA: Wm. B. Eerdmans. ISBN 978-0-8028-4508-5.
