= Keith Ward =

English philosopher, theologian, and Anglican priest (born 1938)

The Reverend Keith Ward FBA
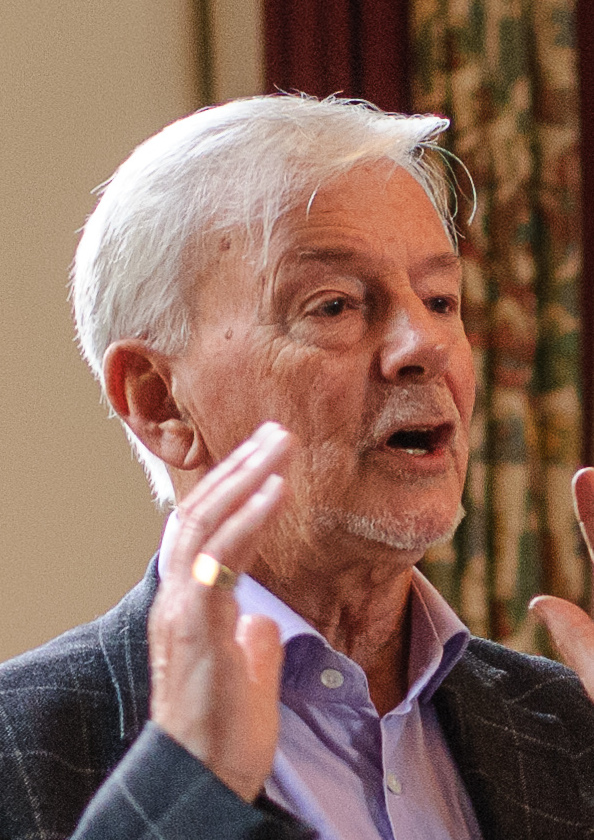
- Born: 22 August 1938 (age 88); Hexham, England

Ecclesiastical career
- Religion: Christianity (Anglican)
- Church: Church of England
- Ordained: 1972 (priest)

Academic background
- Education: University of Wales; Linacre College, Oxford
- Influences: Thomas Aquinas; Karl Barth; Plato; Immanuel Kant; George Berkeley; Ramanuja; Richard Swinburne; Karl Rahner

Academic work
- Discipline: Philosophy; theology
- Sub-discipline: Comparative theology; philosophy of religion
- School or tradition: Analytic philosophy; idealism
- Institutions: University of Glasgow; University of St Andrews; King's College, London; Trinity Hall, Cambridge; Christ Church, Oxford; Gresham College; Heythrop College, London; University of Roehampton
- Doctoral students: Morwenna Ludlow; Paul Waldau
- Main interests: Relationship between religion and science
- Website: keithward.org.uk

Keith Ward FBA (born 1938) is an English philosopher and theologian. He is a fellow of the British Academy and a priest of the Church of England. He was a canon of Christ Church, Oxford, until 2003. Comparative theology and the relationship between science and religion are two of his main topics of interest.

== Academic work ==
Ward was born on 22 August 1938 in Hexham. He graduated in 1962 with a Bachelor of Arts degree from the University of Wales and from 1964 to 1969 was a lecturer in logic at the University of Glasgow. He earned a Bachelor of Letters degree from Linacre College, Oxford, in 1968. Ward has MA and DD degrees from both Cambridge and Oxford universities, and an honorary DD from the University of Glasgow.

From 1969 to 1971 he was lecturer in philosophy at the University of St Andrews. In 1972, he was ordained as a priest in the Church of England. From 1971 to 1975 he was lecturer in philosophy of religion at the University of London. From 1975 to 1983, he was dean of Trinity Hall, Cambridge. He was appointed the F. D. Maurice Professor of Moral and Social Theology at the University of London in 1982, professor of history and philosophy of religion at King's College London in 1985 and Regius Professor of Divinity at the University of Oxford in 1991, a post from which he retired in 2004.

In 1992, Ward was a visiting professor at the Claremont Graduate University in California. In 1993–94, he delivered the prestigious Gifford Lectures at the University of Glasgow. He was the Gresham Professor of Divinity between 2004 and 2008 at Gresham College, London.

Ward is on the council of the Royal Institute of Philosophy and is a member of the editorial boards of Religious Studies, the Journal of Contemporary Religion, Studies in Inter-Religious Dialogue and World Faiths Encounter. He is a member of the board of governors of the Oxford Centre for Hindu Studies. He has also been a visiting professor at Drake University, Iowa, and at the University of Tulsa, Oklahoma.

== Focus and beliefs ==
One of Ward's main focuses is the dialogue between religious traditions, an interest which led him to be joint president of the World Congress of Faiths (WCF) from 1992 to 2001. His work also explores concepts of God and the idea of revelation. He has also written on his opinion of a relationship between science and religion. As an advocate of theistic evolution, he regards evolution and Christianity as essentially compatible, a belief he has described in his book God, Chance and Necessity and which is in contrast to his Oxford colleague Richard Dawkins, a vocal and prominent atheist.

Ward has said that Dawkins' conclusion that there is no God or any purpose in the universe is "naive" and not based on science but on a hatred of religion. Dawkins' strong anti-religious views originate, according to Ward, from earlier encounters with "certain forms of religion which are anti-intellectual and anti-scientific ... and also emotionally pressuring."

Ward has described his own Christian faith as follows:

I am a born-again Christian. I can give a precise day when Christ came to me and began to transform my life with his power and love. He did not make me a saint. But he did make me a forgiven sinner, liberated and renewed, touched by divine power and given the immense gift of an intimate sense of the personal presence of God. I have no difficulty in saying that I wholeheartedly accept Jesus as my personal Lord and Saviour.

In the 1970s, Ward was a champion of evangelical orthodoxy, beloved of Christians of that constituency, a great apologist, preacher, speaker, and defender of a conservative approach to scripture. The turning point for Ward came with the publication of his book A Vision to Pursue, in which he distanced himself from such a conservative approach and adopted a much more critical approach to scripture and a more theologically liberal outlook. He lost many evangelical erstwhile friends and the direction of his writing changed quite dramatically.

Ward has criticised modern-day Christian fundamentalism, most notably in his 2004 book What the Bible Really Teaches: A Challenge for Fundamentalists. He believes that fundamentalists interpret the Bible in implausible ways and pick and choose which of its passages to emphasise to fit pre-existing beliefs. He argues that the Bible must be taken "seriously" but not always "literally" and does not agree with the doctrine of biblical inerrancy, saying that it is not found in the Bible, elaborating that:

There may be discrepancies and errors in the sacred writings, but those truths that God wished to see included in the Scripture, and which are important to our salvation, are placed there without error ... the Bible is not inerrant in detail, but God has ensured that no substantial errors, which mislead us about the nature of salvation, are to be found in Scripture.

== Works ==
=== Books ===
Ward is the author of many books on the nature of religion, the philosophy of religion, the Christian faith, religion and science, the Bible and its interpretation, comparative and systematic theology, and ethics and religion.

Books on the nature of religion include:

- The Case for Religion (2004). Oneworld.
- Is Religion Dangerous? (2006) ISBN 978-0-7459-5262-8; rev. ed. with additional chapter on evolutionary psychology (2010)
- Religion and Human Fulfilment (2008).
- Is Religion Irrational? (2011)
- Religion in the Modern World (2019). Cambridge University Press.

Books on the philosophy of religion include:

- The Concept of God (1974) ISBN 978-0-312-15925-2
- Holding Fast to God (1982) ISBN 978-0-687-85476-9 – a critique of Taking Leave of God by the radical theologian Don Cupitt
- Rational Theology and the Creativity of God (1984) ISBN 0-631-12597-3
- Images of Eternity (1987) ISBN 978-0-232-51686-9; reissued as Concepts of God (1998) ISBN 978-1-85168-064-1
- God, A Guide for the Perplexed (2002) ISBN 978-1-85168-323-9
- The Battle for the Soul (1985) ISBN 978-0-340-37278-4. Reissued by BBC Books in 1986. Reissued as Defending the Soul (1992) and In Defence of the Soul (1998) ISBN 978-1-85168-040-5
- Why There Almost Certainly Is a God (2008) ISBN 978-0-7459-5330-4 (UK) ISBN 978-0-8254-7843-7 (US)
- The God Conclusion (2009), published in the US as God and the Philosophers
- More Than Matter: What Humans Really Are (2010) ISBN 978-0-7459-6247-4
- The Evidence for God: A Case for the Existence of the Spiritual Dimension (2014) ISBN 978-0232531305
- The Christian Idea of God: A Philosophical Foundation for Faith (2017) ISBN 978-1108410212
- Sharing in the Divine Nature (2020). Wipf and Stock.

Books on the Christian faith include:

- The Christian Way (1976) ISBN 978-0-281-02893-1
- A Vision to Pursue (1991) ISBN 978-0-334-02411-8
- God, Faith and the New Millennium (1998)
- Christianity: A Short Introduction (2000) ISBN 978-1-85168-229-4, republished as Christianity: A Beginner's Guide
- Christianity: A Guide for the Perplexed (2007)
- Re-thinking Christianity (2007) ISBN 978-1-85168-506-6
- Christ and the Cosmos: A Reformulation of Trinitarian Doctrine (2015) ISBN 978-1107531819

Books on religion and science include:

- God, Chance and Necessity (1996) ISBN 978-1-85168-116-7
- Pascal's Fire – Scientific Faith and Religious Understanding (2006) ISBN 978-1-85168-446-5
- Divine Action: Examining God's Role in an Open and Emergent Universe (2008)
- The Big Questions in Science and Religion (2008)

Books on the Bible and its interpretation include:

- Is Christianity a Historical Religion? (1992) ISBN 978-0-85217-054-0
- What the Bible Really Teaches: A Challenge for Fundamentalists. 2004. ISBN 978-0-281-05680-4.
- The Word of God? The Bible After Modern Scholarship (2010)
- The Philosopher and the Gospels (2011) ISBN 978-0-7459-5562-9
- Love Is His Meaning: Understanding The Teaching Of Jesus (2017) ISBN 978-0281077632
- Parables About Time and Eternity (2021)

Books on comparative and systematic theology include:

- Religion and Revelation (1994) ISBN 978-0-19-826375-3 (1993–94) Gifford Lectures
- Religion and Creation (1996) ISBN 978-0-19-826394-4
- Religion and Human Nature (1998) ISBN 978-0-19-826965-6
- Religion and Community (2000) ISBN 978-0-19-875259-2
- Religion and Human Fulfillment (2008) ISBN 978-0-334-04163-4

Books on ethics and religion include:

- Ethics and Christianity (1970) ISBN 978-0-04-241001-2
- Kant's View of Ethics (1972)
- The Divine Image (1976) ISBN 978-0-281-02935-8
- The Rule of Love (1989) ISBN 978-0-232-51824-5
- God, Autonomy, and Morality (2013)

Other books include:

- Fifty Key Words in Philosophy (1968). Lutterworth Press.
- The Promise (1980; rev. ed. 2010). SPCK.
- The Living God (1984) ISBN 978-0-281-04126-8
- The Turn of the Tide (1986)
- What Do We Mean By God?: A Little Book of Guidance (2015) ISBN 978-0281073283
- The Mystery of Christ: Meditations and Prayers (2018) ISBN 978-0281079155
- Confessions of a Recovering Fundamentalist (2020) ISBN 9781532696725

=== Multimedia ===
- Keith Ward (13 March 2008). The Triumph of Idealism - Transcript and video. London: Gresham College. Other lectures with transcripts, recorded 2004–2015, are also available on the Gresham College Youtube channel.
- Philosophy, Science and The God Debate, a two-DVD set of filmed interviews with Keith Ward, Alister McGrath and John Lennox, and produced by the Nationwide Christian Trust, OCLC 754656873 Product Code 5055307601776 (November 2011)

== See also ==
- Boyle Lectures

Academic offices
Preceded by Baroness Warnock	Gifford Lecturer at the University of Glasgow; 1993–1994	Succeeded by Geoffrey Cantor
Preceded by Baroness Warnock	Gifford Lecturer at the University of Glasgow; 1993–1994	Succeeded by John Hedley Brooke
Preceded by Maurice Wiles	Regius Professor of Divinity at the University of Oxford; 1991–2004	Succeeded by Marilyn McCord Adams
Preceded by Gwen Griffith-Dickson	Gresham Professor of Divinity; 2004–2008	Succeeded by Lord Harries of Pentregarth
Other offices
Preceded by Malcolm Jeeves	Boyle Lecturer; 2009	Succeeded by John Hedley Brooke
