= Factions in the Democratic Party (United States) =

Ideological and political wings in the party

The United States Democratic Party has significantly evolved and includes various factions throughout its history. Into the 21st century, the liberal faction represents the modern American liberalism that began with the New Deal in the 1930s and continued with both the New Frontier and Great Society in the 1960s. The moderate faction supports Third Way politics that includes center-left social policies and centrist fiscal policies, mostly associated with the New Democrats and Clintonism of the 1990s, while the left-wing faction (known as progressives) advocates for progressivism and social democracy. Historical factions of the Democratic Party include the founding Jacksonians, the Copperheads and War Democrats during the American Civil War, the Redeemers, Bourbon Democrats, and Silverites in the late-19th century, and the Southern Democrats and New Deal Democrats in the 20th century. The early Democratic Party was also influenced by Jeffersonians and the Young America movement.

== 21st-century factions ==
=== Liberals ===
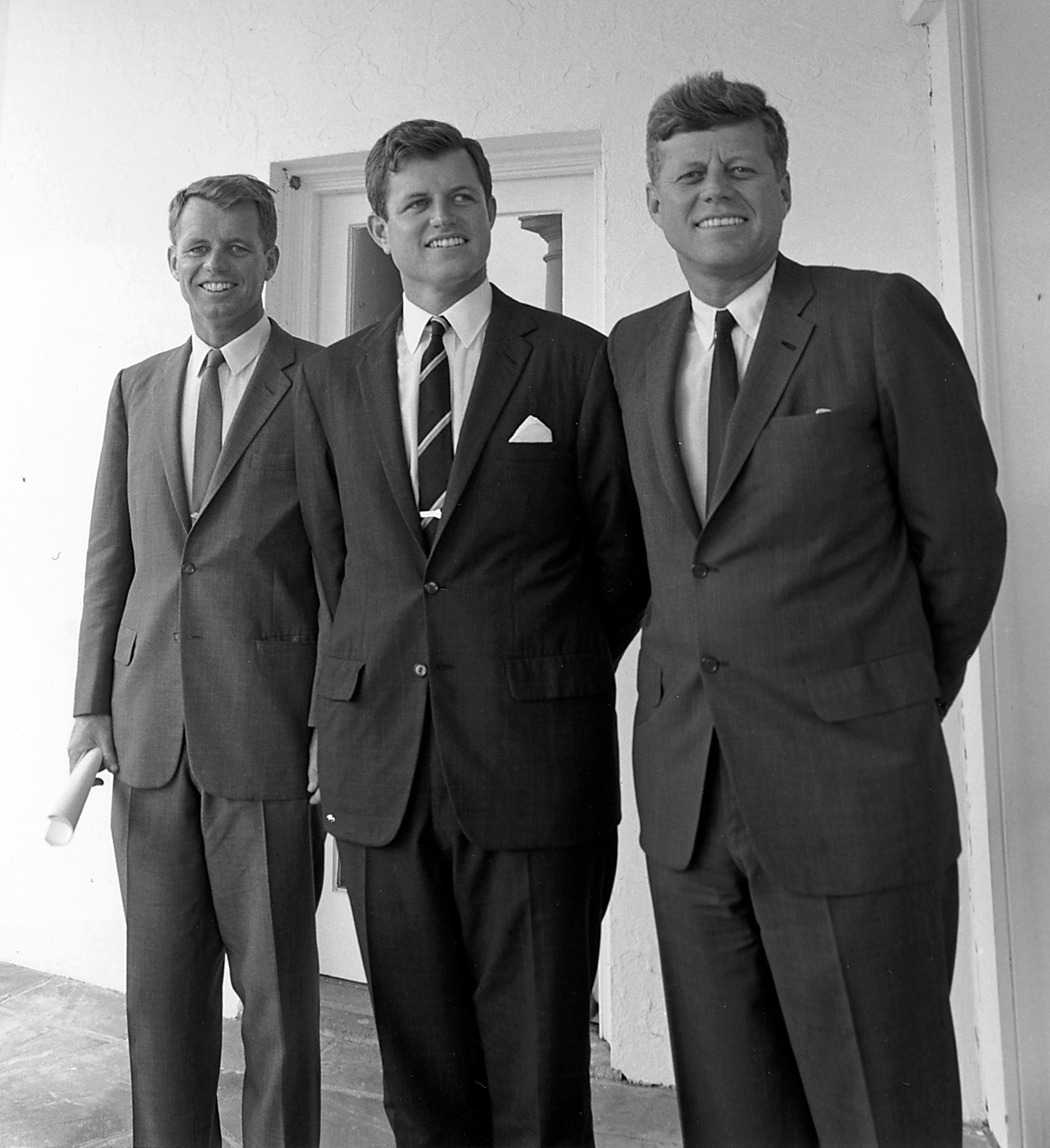
The Kennedy brothers: 35th President John F. Kennedy (right), Attorney General Robert F. Kennedy (left), and Senator Ted Kennedy (middle) in 1963

The Kennedy family dynasty was extremely influential to the development and popularity of the modern American liberal movement throughout the 1960s.

Modern liberalism in the United States began during the Progressive Era with President Theodore Roosevelt (a Republican) and his Square Deal and New Nationalism policies, with center-left ideas increasingly leaning toward the political philosophy of social liberalism, better known in the United States as modern liberalism. Following Franklin D. Roosevelt's New Deal, Harry S. Truman's Fair Deal, John F. Kennedy's New Frontier, and Lyndon B. Johnson's Great Society (the latter of which established Medicare and Medicaid) further established the popularity of liberalism in the nation and became part the Democratic tradition. While the resurgence of conservatism and the Third Way of Bill Clinton's New Democrats briefly weakened the influence of modern liberalism, Barack Obama acted as an ideological bridge. While characterizing himself as a New Democrat, Obama toed the ideological line between Third Way and modern liberalism.

Percent of self-identified liberals by state in 2018 according to a Gallup poll: 32% and above 28–31% 24–27% 20–23% 16–19% 15% and under

The key legislative achievement of the Obama administration, the passage and enactment of the Patient Protection and Affordable Care Act (Obamacare), was generally supported among liberal Democrats. Under Obama, Democrats achieved an expansion of LGBT rights and federal hate crime laws, rescinded the Mexico City policy (later reinstituted by President Donald Trump) and the ban on federal taxpayer dollars to fund research on embryonic stem cells, and implemented the Joint Comprehensive Plan of Action and the Cuban thaw.

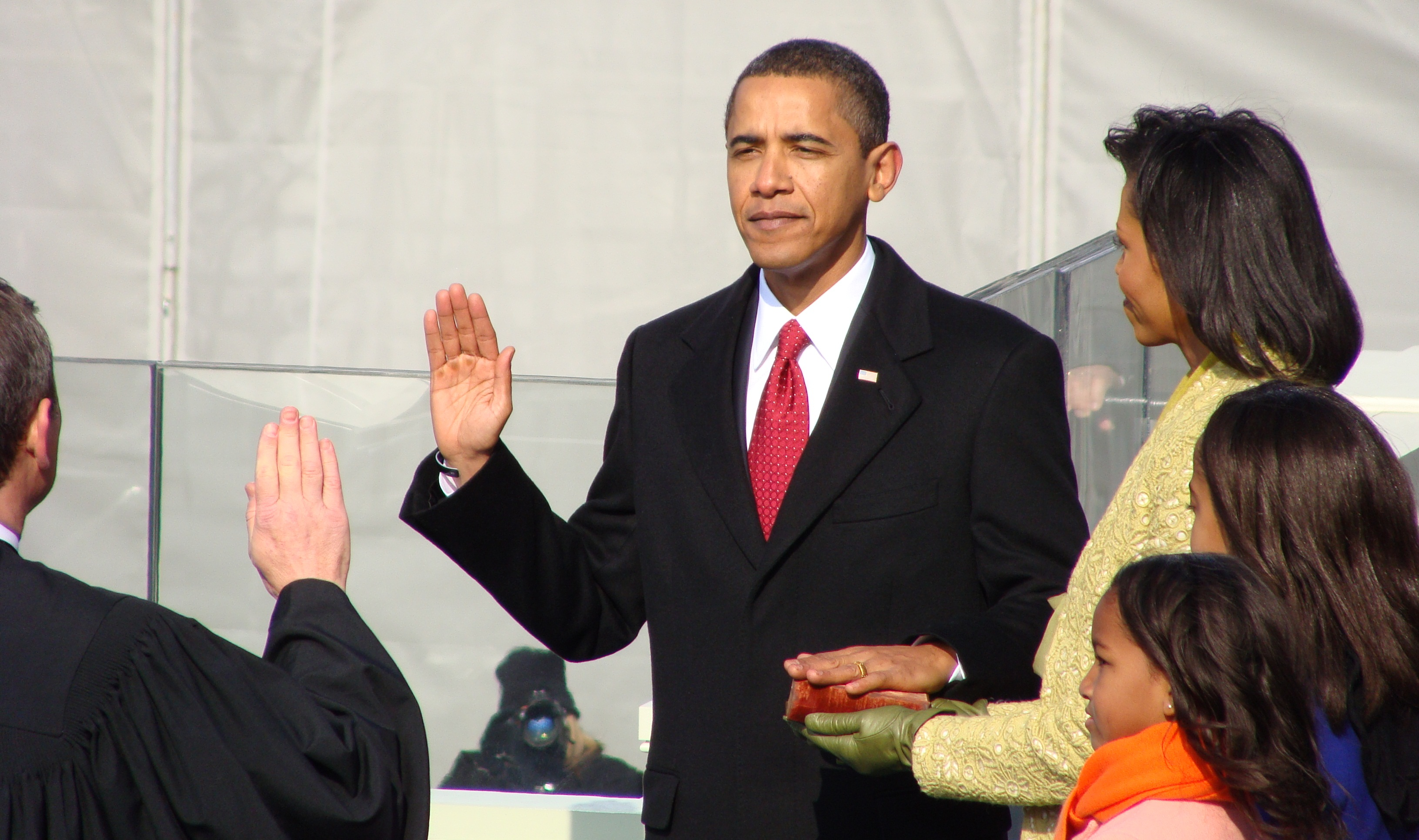
44th President Barack Obama during his swearing in ceremony in 2009

The Obama-Biden administration was known for helping bridge the ideological gap between contemporary American liberalism and the politically moderate Third Way movement, the latter being a faction that dominated politics in the decade prior.

In 2011, the Democratic Leadership Council, which supported centrist and Third Way positions, was dissolved. In 2016, Democratic presidential nominee Hillary Clinton eschewed her husband's "New Covenant" centrism and pursued more liberal proposals, such as rolling back mandatory minimum sentencing laws, a debt-free college tuition plan for public university students, and a pathway to citizenship for undocumented immigrants. President Joe Biden, a moderate Democrat, also adopted more traditional liberal policies during his presidency and was more willing to address the concern of the progressive wing than Presidents Clinton and Obama.

Liberals include most of academia, as well as large portions of the professional class. The liberal wing differs from the traditional organized labor base. According to political scientists Matt Grossmann and David A. Hopkins, the increase in educational attainment in the United States has led to the increase of liberalism in the Democratic Party.

=== Moderates ===
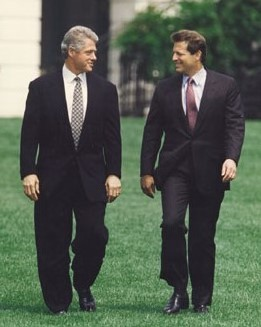
42nd President Bill Clinton and 45th Vice President Al Gore in 1993

The Clinton-Gore administration marked the height of the politically moderate Third Way movement (also known as Clintonism) within the Democratic Party during the 1990s.

Generally speaking, moderate Democrats are Democrats who are fiscally moderate-to-conservative and socially moderate-to-liberal. They are more likely to be located in swing states and swing seats. The success of modern liberalism was weakened with the presidency of Ronald Reagan and the ensuing tide of conservative popularity in response to a perception of liberal failure. In reaction to angst following Reagan's landslide victory over liberal Democrat Walter Mondale in the 1984 United States presidential election, the Third Way movement was formed. It is associated with the presidency of Bill Clinton and the New Democrats.

During the 1992 United States presidential election, Clinton and running mate Al Gore ran as New Democrats who were willing to synthesize fiscally conservative views with the more culturally liberal position of the Democratic Party ethos, or to harmonize center-left and center-right politics. Clinton was both the first Democrat elected president since 1976 and the first re-elected to a second full term since 1948. Most moderate Democrats in the United States House of Representatives are members of the New Democrat Coalition, although there is considerable overlap in the membership of New Democrats and Blue Dogs, with most Blue Dogs also being New Democrats. Presidents Barack Obama and Joe Biden largely tried to unify the various factions of the Democratic Party while still addressing the goals of the progressive wing, although Obama was hammered by the conservative factions and the Tea Party movement. The Third Way is still a large coalition in the modern Democratic Party. Clinton himself helped to move the Democratic Party beyond the New Democrats and the Third Way, owing to a more favorable political context than the 1990s, with Obama and Hillary Clinton representing a more liberal ambitious vision.

Since the 2010s, many former Republican moderates switched to identify as Democrats, namely former Florida governor and U.S. Representative Charlie Crist.

=== Progressives ===
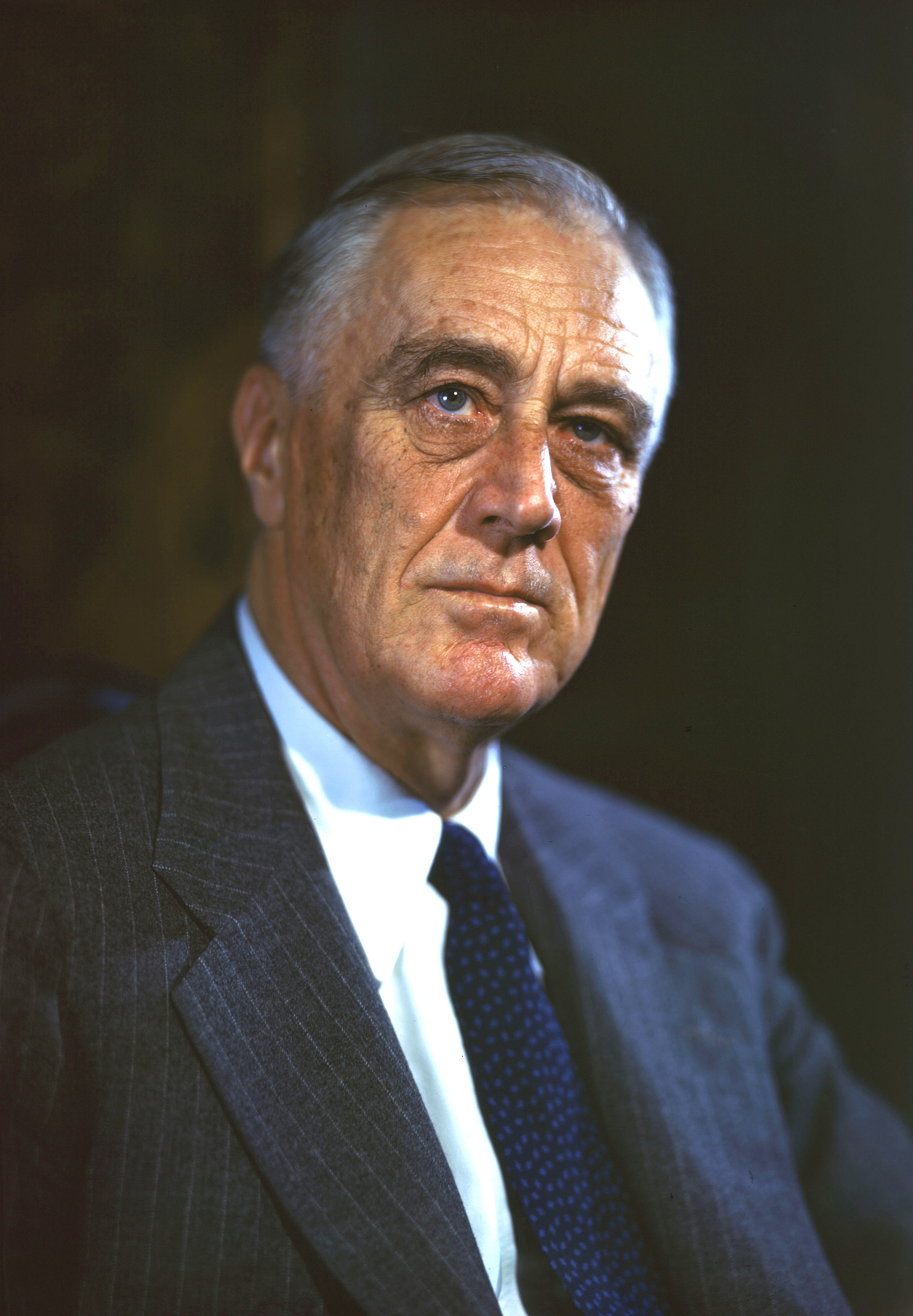
32nd President Franklin D. Roosevelt advanced many progressive economic causes and is largely credited with inspiring modern progressivism in the United States with his New Deal policies.

The modern progressive wing draws deeply from the progressive economic and political philosophies of Woodrow Wilson's New Freedom and Franklin D. Roosevelt's New Deal, and more broadly from the New Deal coalition. Historically, progressives were not limited to the Democratic Party, and the modern progressives in the Democratic Party are influenced by the activist reformism of Theodore Roosevelt (particularly the Square Deal and New Nationalism, which in turn influenced the New Freedom and the New Deal) and Herbert Croly (who rejected the thesis that the liberal tradition was inhospitable to anti-capitalist alternatives), as well as La Follette family (particularly Robert M. La Follette who founded the Progressive Party in 1924) and former Franklin D. Roosevelt's Vice President Henry A. Wallace, who founded another Progressive Party in 1948 after denouncing the anti-Communist foreign policy of the liberal President Harry S. Truman.

The historical progressive wing of the Democratic Party is associated with William Jennings Bryan and the People's Party. They gained control of the party in 1896, when the Democratic Party selected at that time the youngest presidential candidate in Bryan and repudiated the more conservative administration of Grover Cleveland, and kept it until 1908, the last time Bryan was the presidential nominee. With the exception of 1904, when the Bourbon Democrats and conservative allies of Cleveland regained control while Theodore Roosevelt's platform included progressive policies advocated by Bryan and his supporters, the Democratic Party nominee was from the progressive wing. Bryan and the historical progressives successfully turned the Democratic Party from a conservative party to a progressive alliance that elected Wilson, Franklin D. Roosevelt, John F. Kennedy, and Lyndon B. Johnson.

Unlike some members of the historical progressive wing, such as Bryan who held fundamentalist religious views, modern progressives in the Democratic Party are secular and culturally liberal on social issues like race and identity, where they draw inspiration from the Civil Rights Act of 1964 and the Voting Rights Act of 1965 proposed by President Kennedy, enacted by President Johnson, and advocated for by Martin Luther King Jr. While it does not transcend the political philosophy of modern liberalism, the progressive wing has fused tenets of cultural liberalism with the economic left-leaning traditions of the Progressive Era, as well as drawing more robustly from Keynesian economics, left-wing populism, and democratic socialism/social democracy, particularly through Franklin D. Roosevelt's Four Freedoms.

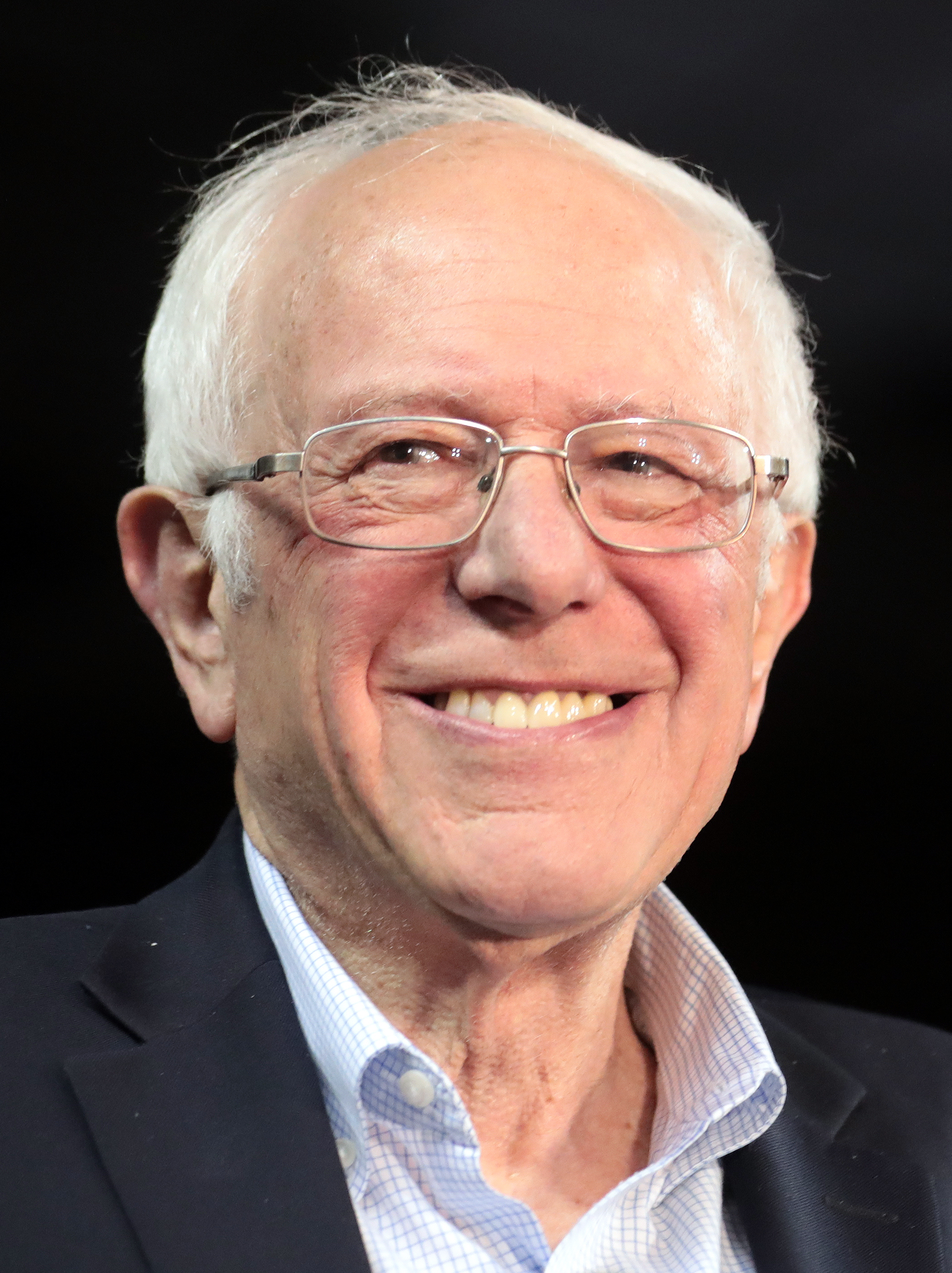
Senator Bernie Sanders, while an independent, caucuses with the Democratic Party and is often considered an influential figure in the modern progressive movement in the United States.

President Johnson and civil rights movement activists, such as King, were influential to progressives not only for their positions on race and identity but also on economics, for example Johnson for the Great Society, which has been called by some a "second Reconstruction", or King for his support of democratic socialism. While there are differences between them, both historical progressivism and the modern progressive movement share the belief that free markets lead to economic inequalities, and therefore that the free market must be aggressively monitored and regulated with broad economic and social rights to protect the working class.

The Congressional Progressive Caucus is a caucus of progressive House Democrats in the United States Congress, along with one independent in the Senate (Bernie Sanders), a progressive who identifies as a democratic socialist, and ran in the 2016 and 2020 Democratic presidential primaries. Alongside the Democratic Party's broader progressive wing, Sanders is credited by both supporters and opponents with influencing a leftward shift in the party, as well as for the election of several democratic socialists within the Democratic Party. In 2016, the Blue Collar Caucus, a pro-labor and anti-outsourcing caucus, was formed by representatives Marc Veasey and Brendan Boyle.

A small number of progressives self-identify as democratic socialists, although supporters and academic experts describe their beliefs as being closer to European social democracy and unrelated to actual socialism or communism. Since 2019, there have been at least six democratic socialists in the House of Representatives as members of the Democratic Party, and in doing so some of them defeated notable New Democrats incumbents, such as Joe Crowley and Eliot Engel, in the primaries. As of 2024, at least thirteen socialist Democratic representatives were or had at some point been affiliated with the Democratic Socialists of America (DSA), which is an independent organization that works within Democratic Party, including Alexandria Ocasio-Cortez, Rashida Tlaib, and Greg Casar, who was elected in 2024 to lead the progressive caucus. Former Democratic representatives, such as Ron Dellums, David Bonior, Major Owens, John Conyers, Jerry Nadler, Danny K. Davis, Shri Thanedar, Cori Bush, and Jamaal Bowman, were also affiliated with the DSA. In turn, some progressive Democrats have sought to court or distance themselves from the organization.

=== Conservatives ===
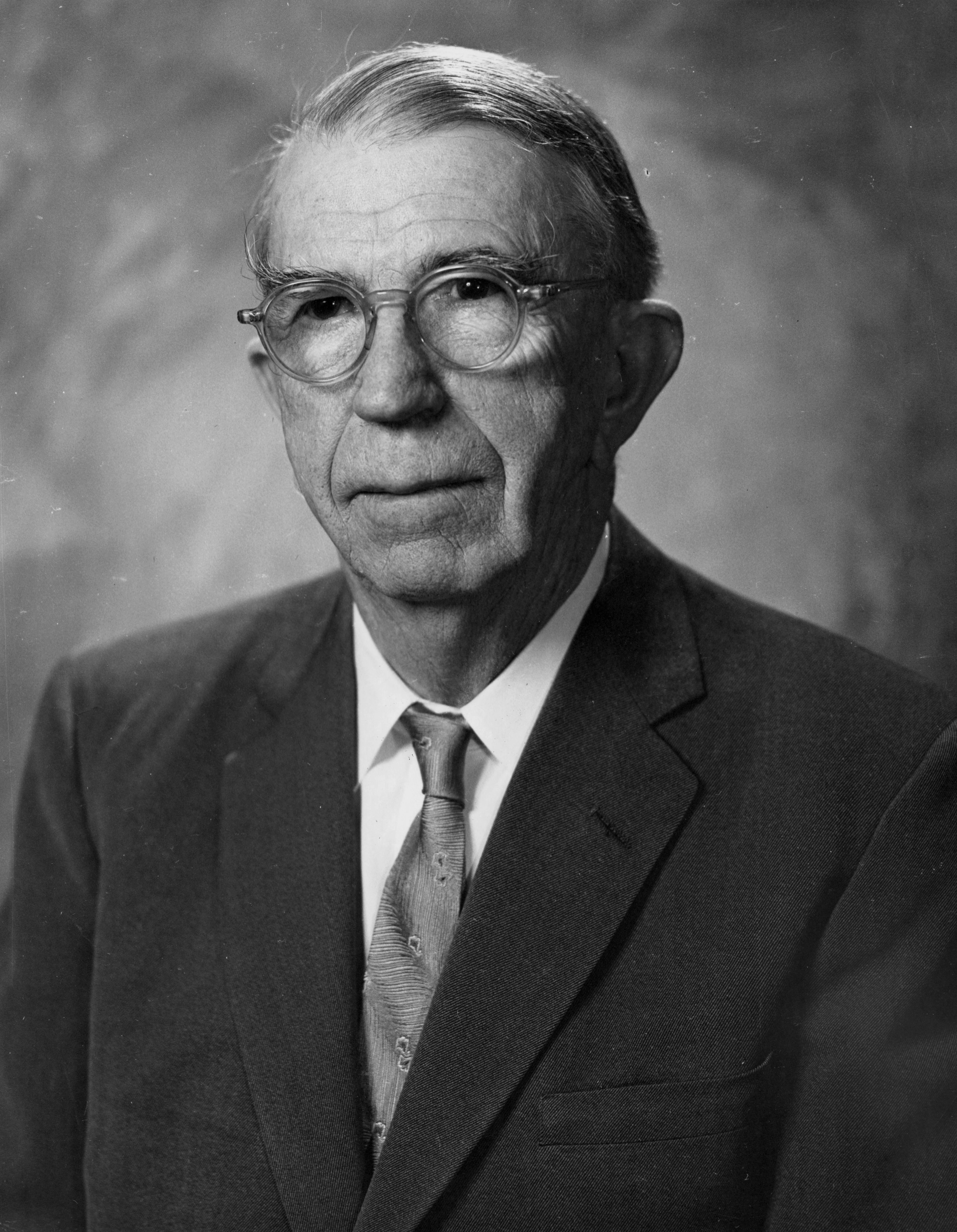
Representative Howard W. Smith, a leader of the informal but powerful conservative coalition

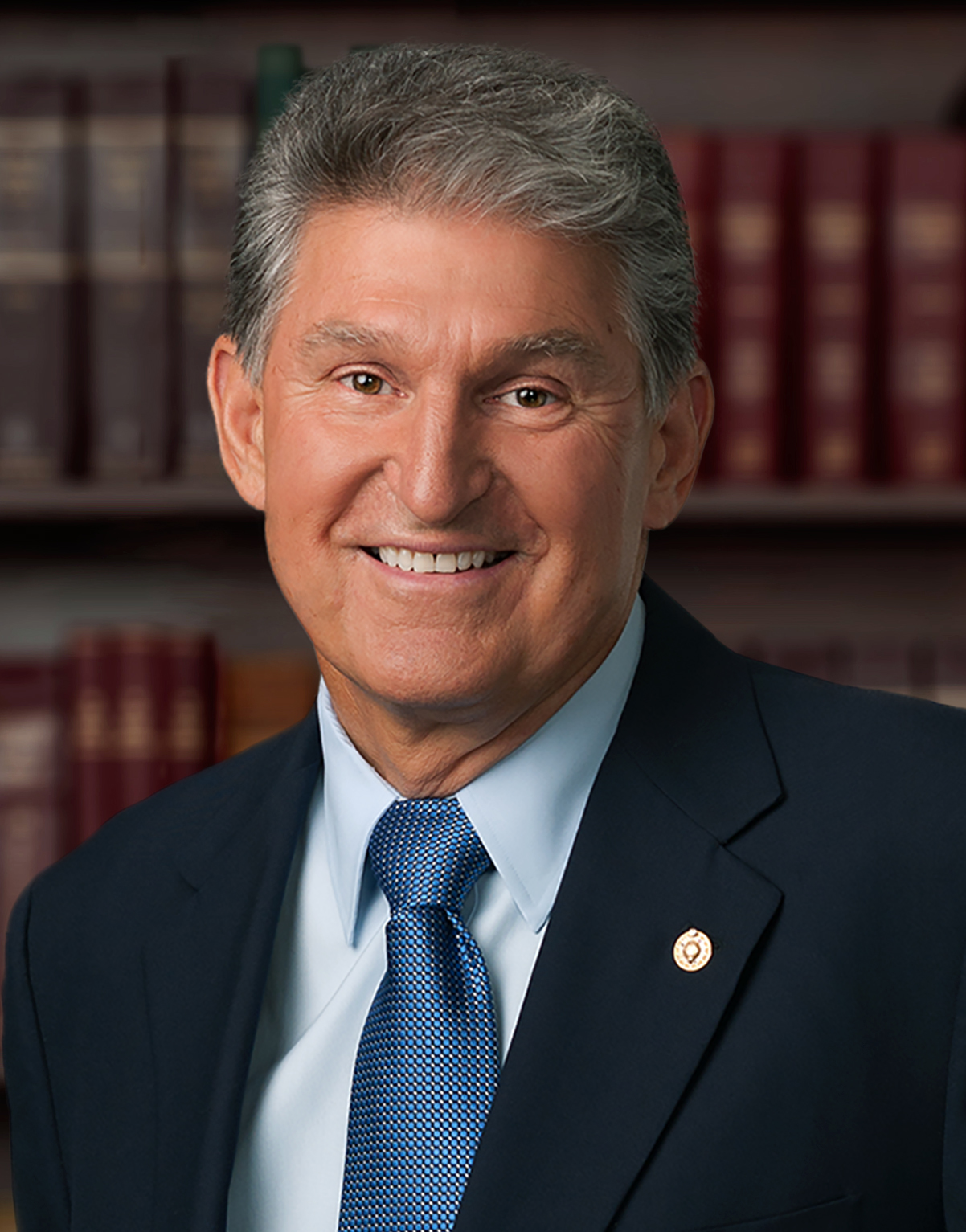
During his tenure, former Senator Joe Manchin was described by political analysts as the Senate Democratic Caucus's most conservative member.

The conservative coalition was an unofficial coalition in the United States Congress bringing together a conservative majority of the Republican Party and the conservative, mostly Southern wing of the Democratic Party. It was dominant in Congress from 1937 to 1963 and remained a political force until the mid-1980s, eventually dying out in the 1990s. In terms of Congressional roll call votes, it primarily appeared on votes affecting labor unions. The conservative coalition did not operate on civil rights bills, for the two wings had opposing viewpoints. However, the coalition did have the power to prevent unwanted bills from even coming to a vote. The coalition included many committee chairmen from the South who blocked bills by not reporting them from their committees. Furthermore, Howard W. Smith, Chairman of the House Rules Committee, often could kill a bill simply by not reporting it out with a favorable rule and he lost some of that power in 1961. The conservative coalition was not concerned with foreign policy as most of the Southern Democrats were internationalists, a position opposed by most Republicans.

Today, conservative Democrats are generally regarded as members of the Democratic Party who are more conservative than the national political party as a whole. The Blue Dog Coalition was originally founded as a group of conservative Democrats. As of 2026, 10 House members are part of the Blue Dog Coalition.

Since the 2020s, some conservative dissidents opposed to the MAGA movement and Trumpism likewise defected to become Democrats, such as George Conway and Olivia Troye.

The conservative faction has significantly declined since the 2010s, from 54 Blue Dog Coalition members at it's peak in 2009, to 10 in 2026.

== Congressional caucuses ==
The following table lists coalitions' electoral results for the House of Representatives.

| Election year | Blue Dog Coalition | New Democrat Coalition | Congressional Progressive Caucus |
|---|---|---|---|
| 2006 | 50 / 233 | 63 / 233 | Not yet established |
| 2008 | 54 / 257 | 59 / 257 | 71 / 257 |
| 2010 | 26 / 193 | 42 / 193 | 77 / 193 |
| 2012 | 19 / 201 | 53 / 201 | 68 / 201 |
| 2014 | 15 / 188 | 46 / 188 | 68 / 188 |
| 2016 | 18 / 194 | 61 / 194 | 78 / 194 |
| 2018 | 26 / 235 | 103 / 235 | 96 / 235 |
| 2020 | 19 / 222 | 94 / 222 | 95 / 222 |
| 2022 | 10 / 213 | 94 / 213 | 101 / 213 |
| 2024 | 10 / 215 | 109 / 215 | 95 / 215 |

== Historical factions ==
=== Early Democratic Party ===
Jeffersonians, named after founding father Thomas Jefferson, was a political movement in the late 18th and early 19th centuries. While it dominated the First Party System which predates the Democratic Party, many of its beliefs influenced the party throughout the 19th century. These beliefs were concentrated around the beliefs of republicanism and agrarianism. Other than Jefferson, who is considered the father of the Democratic Party, early notable Jeffersonians included Virginia dynasty U.S. Presidents James Madison and James Monroe.

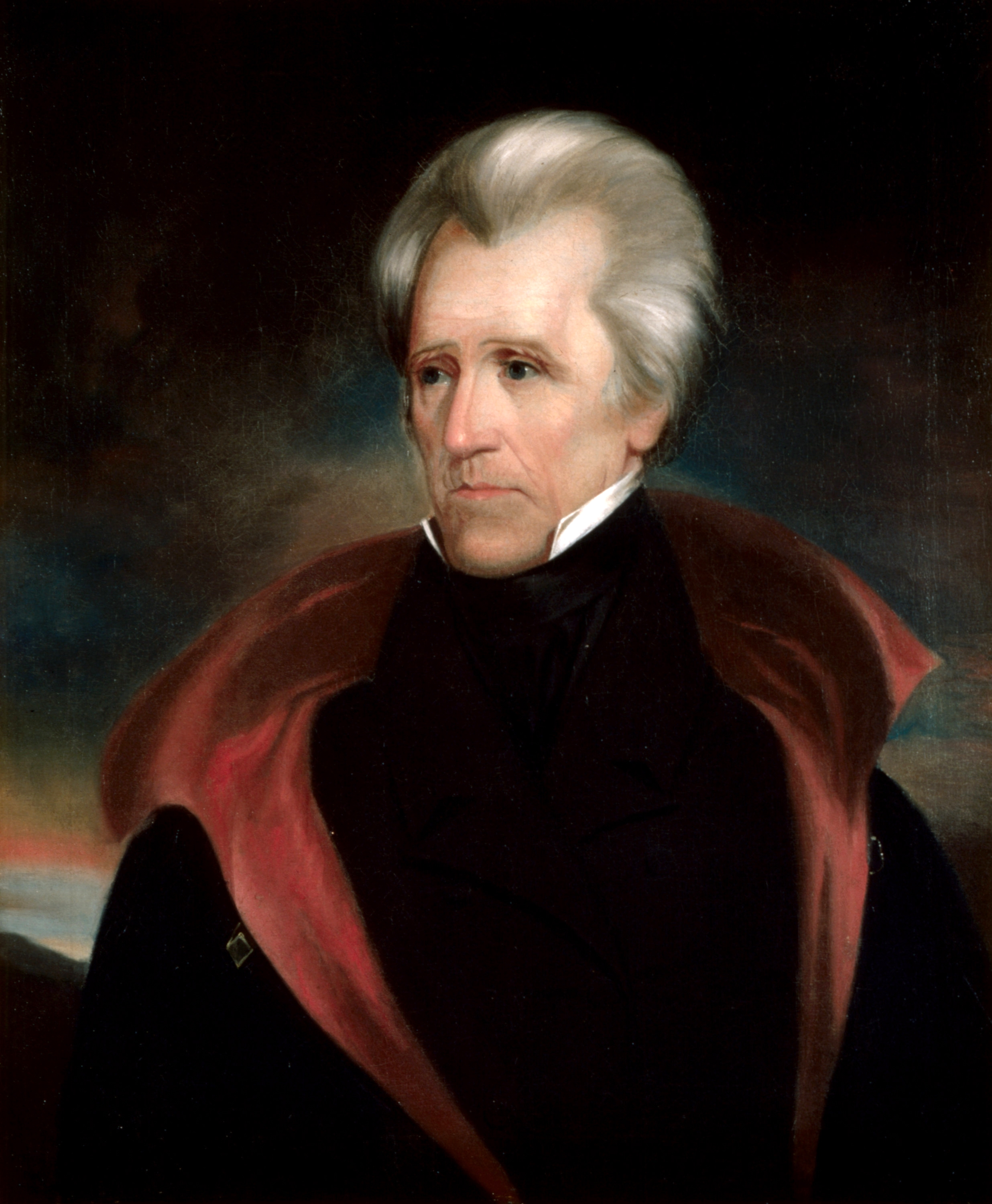
7th President Andrew Jackson, namesake of the Jacksonian Democrats

Jacksonianism was the foundational ideology of the Democratic Party with the election of Andrew Jackson as president in 1828, and it was the predominant faction of the party until the 1840s. It represented the politics of Jackson, which were a modified form of Jeffersonianism. Other than Jackson, notable Jacksonian Democrats include presidents Martin Van Buren and James K. Polk. Jacksonians supported a small federal government and stronger state governments, and promoted territorial expansionism, following Jefferson with his 1803 purchase of Louisiana. They were also opponents of central banking, which represented an early factional division in the Democratic Party when Jacksonians competed against pro-bank Democrats.

Opponents of the Jacksonian faction, such as Henry Clay, Daniel Webster, and William Henry Harrison, left the Democratic Party to found the Whig Party, which served as the main opposition to Jacksonian Democrats until the rise of the Republican Party. The Democrats led by the Jacksonian faction won all presidential elections but two (1840 and 1848), and dominated national politics until the early 1860s. Jacksonians supported the Southern United States on several issues, including slavery, arguing that it was permissible on the grounds of states' rights, and protective tariffs, opposing them on the grounds that they disproportionately benefited the North. Despite their national success, the early Democrats ultimately crumbled over the issue of slavery and secession, with Northern Democrats more favorable to the stop or end of slavery and Southern Democrats overwhelmingly supportive of it. Even if the Democrats were united in 1860, it is doubtful they would have defeated Abraham Lincoln.

The Young America movement was a political movement in the 1830s throughout the 1850s. While not an explicit political faction, it impacted many Democratic party ideals though its promotion of capitalism and manifest destiny, and broke with the agrarian and strict constructionist orthodoxies of the past; it embraced commerce, technology, regulation, reform, and internationalism. Notable promoters included President Franklin Pierce and 1860 presidential nominee Stephen A. Douglas. Pierce became the first elected president who had his renomination denied by his own party. This happened because he had aliened fellow Northern Democrats when he signed the Kansas–Nebraska Act, which was drafted by Douglas, that effectively repealed the Missouri Compromise of 1820 and allowed slavery into the Kansas Territory.

=== Civil War and Reconstruction era ===
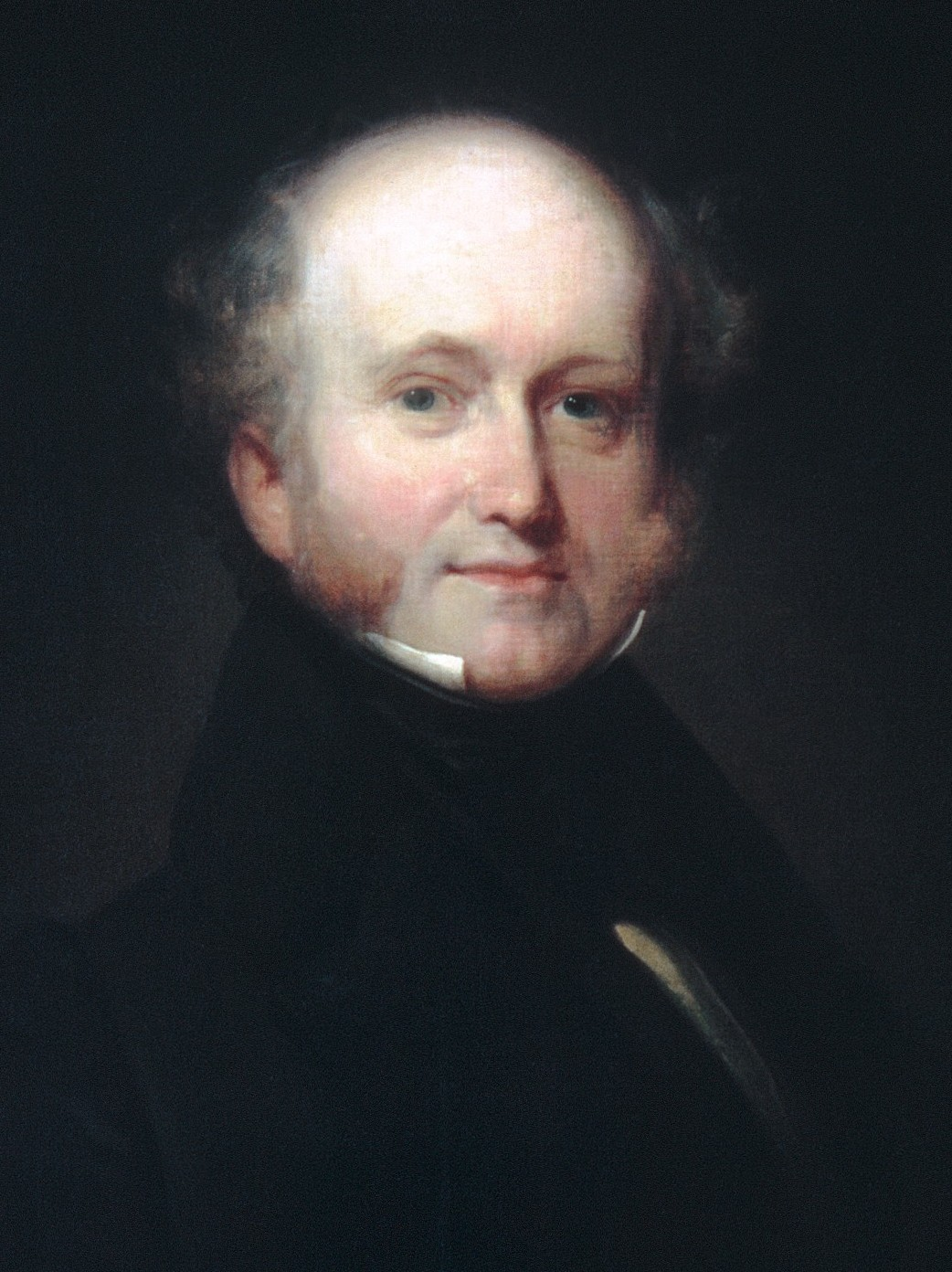
8th President and Vice President Martin Van Buren, an early Democrat who became presidential nominee of the short-lived Free Soil Party

The Free Soil Party had many former members of the Democratic Party, most notably their 1848 presidential candidate and former President Martin Van Buren. The party's main platform was opposition to the expansion of slavery into new territories acquired from the Mexican–American War. Many anti-slavery Northern Democrats voted for Van Buren in 1848, and paved the way for the win of the Whig Party and the election of Zachary Taylor.

During the American Civil War, the Democratic Party split into several factions: the Fire Eaters, the Copperheads or Peace Democrats, and War Democrats. The Fire-Eaters were Southern Democrats who promoted the idea of Southern secession prior to the Civil War. They sought to preserve slavery throughout the United States. The Copperheads were a faction of Northern Democrats during the Civil War that sought an immediate end to the war. Many Copperheads sympathized with the Confederacy, with members accused by Republicans as treasonous. They promoted the ideas of agrarianism inspired from Jacksonian thought that appealed to many poor farmers in border states. The War Democrats were a group of Democrats that opposed the Copperheads and supported President Abraham Lincoln's stance towards the South and bring it back in the Union; however, they objected to Lincoln's emancipation policies and after 1863 were increasingly less enthusiastic about the war and its goals. Despite this, the War Democrats allied with Republicans under the National Union ticket to compete in the 1864 United States elections. Redeemers were Southern Democrats that after the end of the Civil War sought to return white supremacists to power in the South. They were opposed to the expansion of rights given to Black Americans and were associated with groups like the White League, Red Shirts, and the Ku Klux Klan.

=== Gilded, Progressive, and New Deal eras ===
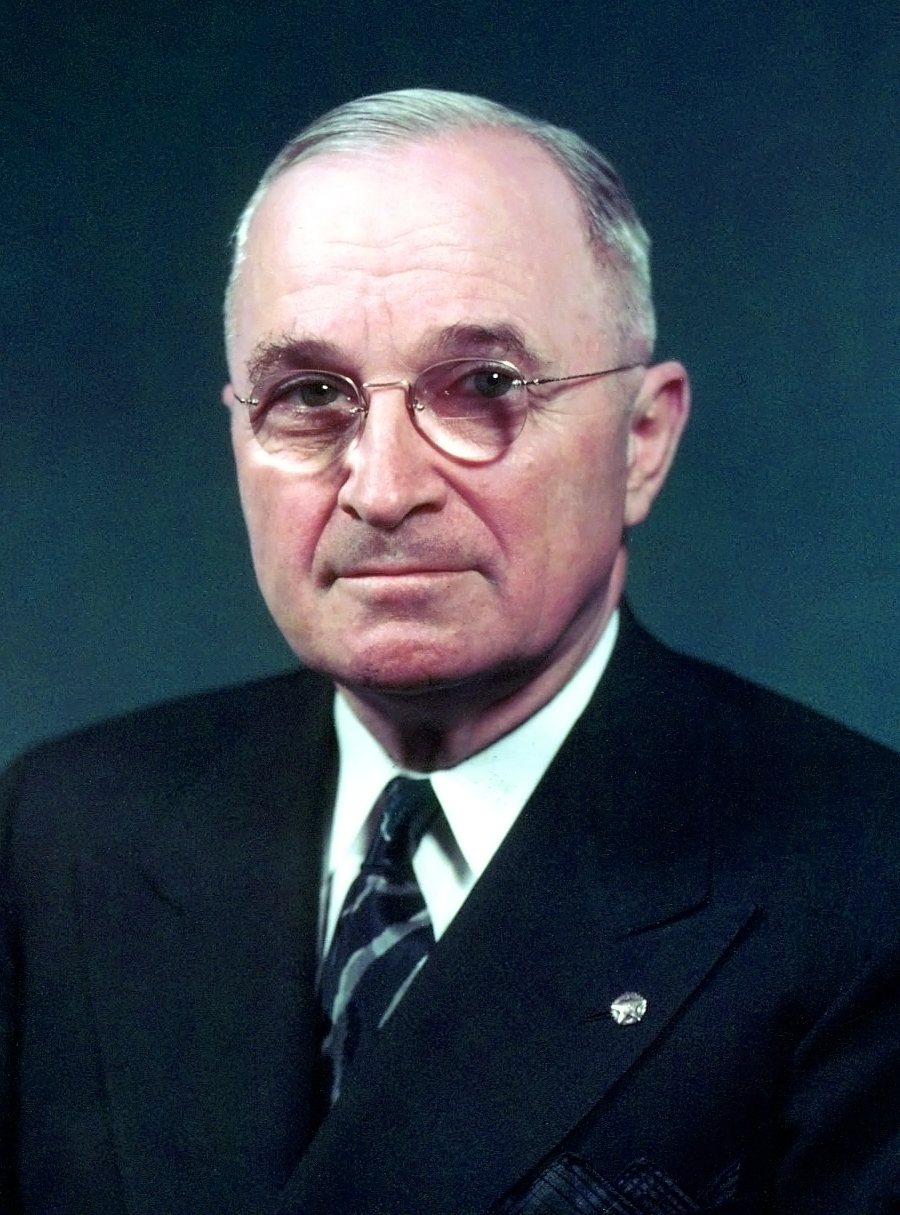
33rd President Harry S. Truman continued the New Deal era with his Fair Deal, and propelled civil rights issues in the Democratic Party with Executive Order 9981 in 1948.

Following the end of the Civil War, several factions emerged in the Democratic Party during the Third Party System, such as the Bourbon Democrats (1872–1912) and Silverites (1870s–1890s). During the Gilded Age, or from around 1877 to 1896, the only Democratic president to win both the Electoral College and popular vote was the Bourbon Democrat Grover Cleveland (1885–1889 and 1893–1897). During the Fourth and Fifth Party Systems in the 20th century, new factions like the Progressives (1890s–1910s) and the New Deal coalition (1930s–1970s) arose. From 1897 to 1932, the only Democratic president was Woodrow Wilson (1913–1921). Although he enacted a series of progressive reforms that came to define modern liberalism, Wilson de facto imposed racial segregation in the federal government.

The New Deal coalition began after election of Franklin D. Roosevelt in 1932 during the Great Depression. The conservative coalition was an unofficial coalition in the United States Congress bringing together a conservative majority of the Republican Party and the conservative, mostly Southern wing of the Democratic Party. It was dominant in Congress from 1937 to 1963, until President Lyndon B. Johnson signed the Civil Rights Act of 1964 into law. It was only until after World War II that the Democratic Party began to support civil rights towards racial equality, starting with President Harry S. Truman desegregating the United States Armed Forces (Executive Order 9981) in 1948. That same year, Truman's civil rights policies of his Fair Deal led to conservative Democrats to leave the party and form the Dixiecrats. There was also a split with the progressive wing, as Henry A. Wallace founded the Progressive Party. Despite the splits, Truman won the 1948 United States presidential election. Harold D. Woodman summarizes the explanation that external forces caused the disintegration of the Jim Crow South from the 1920s to the 1970s:

When a significant change finally occurred, its impetus came from outside the South. Depression-bred New Deal reforms, war-induced demand for labor in the North, perfection of cotton-picking machinery, and civil rights legislation and court decisions finally ... destroyed the plantation system, undermined landlord or merchant hegemony, diversified agriculture and transformed it from a labor- to a capital-intensive industry, and ended the legal and extra-legal support for racism. The discontinuity that war, invasion, military occupation, the confiscation of slave property, and state and national legislation failed to bring in the mid-19th century, finally arrived in the second third of the 20th century. A "second reconstruction" created a real New South.

After the Republican presidency of Dwight D. Eisenhower, Democrats narrowly won the 1960 United States presidential election and John F. Kennedy became the first Roman Catholic to be elected U.S. president. Through the New Frontier, his domestic policies mirrored that of traditional liberalism (Wilson's New Freedom, Roosevelt's New Deal, and Truman's Fair Deal), continued the foreign policies of liberal internationalism, and made further civil rights advances. He was cautious about civil rights due to the power of Southern Democrats, which was only dealt with by President Johnson thanks to his skills as a former Senate majority leader. As a result, the Solid South was no longer Democratic.

=== Late 20th century and early 21st century ===
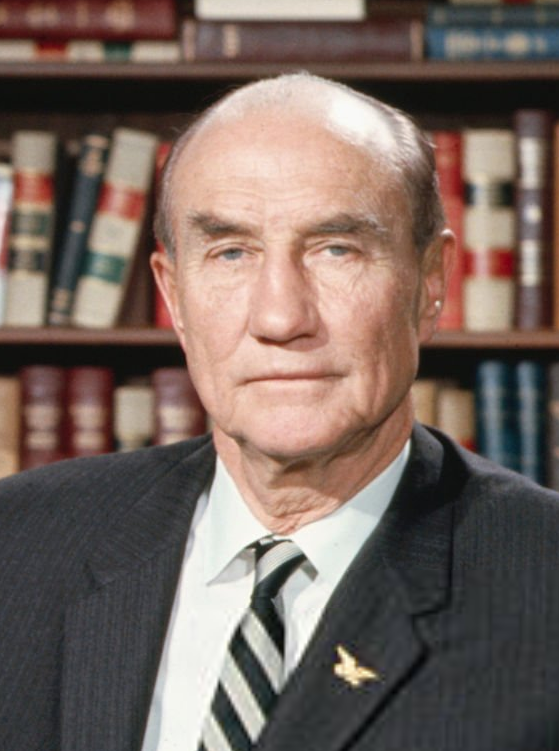
Strom Thurmond, leader of the short-lived Dixiecrat Party

Throughout the 20th century, Southern factions within the Democratic Party emerged and held significant power around the issue of civil rights, segregation, and other issues. These included the conservative coalition (1930s–1960s), the Solid South (1870s–1960s), Dixiecrats (1940s), and the boll weevils (1980s). In 1968, President Lyndon B. Johnson's policies in Vietnam were unpopular and divided the party, eventually leading to his withdrawal from the presidential race. His Vice President Hubert Humphrey was nominated the presidential nominee without a competitive primary. These factors, coupled with competition from the American Independent Party candidate George Wallace, a conservative Southern Democrat and former governor of Alabama, contributed to his narrow defeat to Richard Nixon.

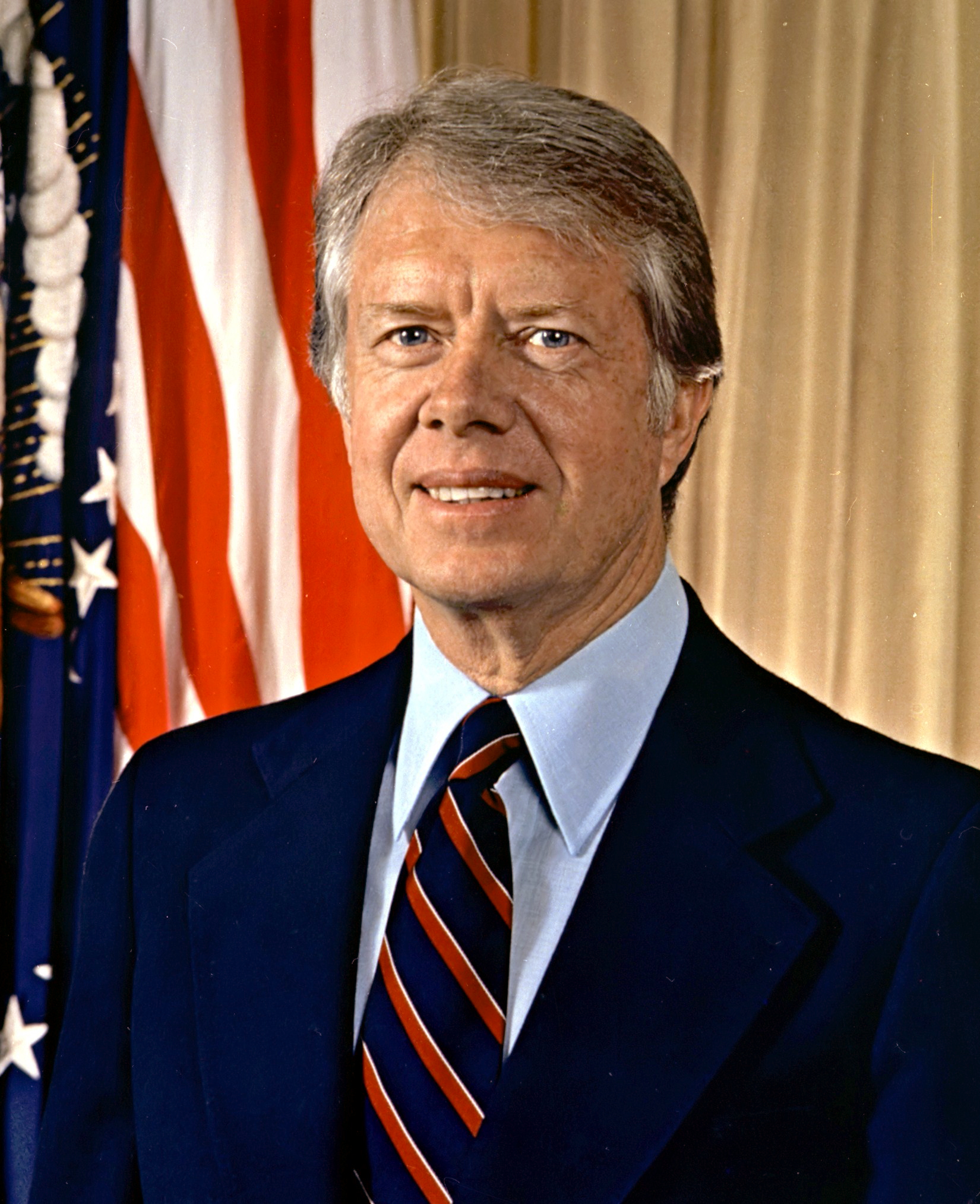
39th President Jimmy Carter was a Southern Democrat from Georgia and the longest-lived president in U.S. history at age 100.

During the 1970s, the Democratic Party significantly reformed their selection of delegates and presidential nomination rules. Changes included minority representation, an equal delegations division between men and women, and delegates being awarded on a proportional basis. The progressive George McGovern lost in a landslide to Nixon in 1972. Jimmy Carter, a Southern Democrat, was elected to the presidency of 1976, also thanks to Gerald Ford's unpopularity and his pardon of Nixon for his criminal activities in the Watergate scandal; however, inflation and foreign issues doomed Carter's re-election bid in 1980. With the worldwide rise of neoliberalism in the 1970s and the dismantling of the Keynesian post-war consensus amid a stagflation and an energy crisis, the New Deal era came to an end and was followed by the Reagan era, with Republicans dominating the 1980s.

After twelve years of Republican presidencies, Democrats returned to the White House in 1992 with another Southern Democrat, Bill Clinton, who ran as a moderate ("The era of big government is over") and with the strategy "It's the economy, stupid". Clinton became the first Democrat to win the presidency without winning Texas, and his ticket with Al Gore, another Southern Democrat, was the first successful all-South ticket since that of Andrew Jackson and John C. Calhoun in 1828. Clinton and Gore were successful in regaining the support of Reagan Democrats. Until the "Republican Revolution" of 1994, when voters returned a Republican Congress despite peace, an improved economy, and high approval job ratings of the Clinton presidency, most Southern members of the House of Representatives were Democrats.

The conservative coalition remained a political force until the mid-1980s, eventually dying out in the 1990s. In terms of congressional roll call votes, it primarily appeared on votes affecting labor unions. The conservative coalition did not operate on civil rights bills, for the two wings had opposing viewpoints. The conservative coalition had the power to prevent unwanted bills from even coming to a vote. The coalition included many committee chairmen from the South who blocked bills by not reporting them from their committees. Furthermore, Howard W. Smith, chairman of the United States House Committee on Rules, often could kill a bill simply by not reporting it out with a favorable rule, although he lost some of that power in 1961. During the presidency of Harry S. Truman, who was more worried about the Democratic Party's veering to the right, Smith once stated that union leaders were threatening to establish a labor chieftains-run plutocracy. The traditional conservative Democratic faction lost much of its influence in the 21st century as the South politically realigned towards the Republican Party. Starting in the late 2010s to the early 2020s, a new set of moderate to conservative college-educated voters disillusioned with Trumpism began voting for Democrats.

== See also ==
Democratic Party

- Democratic Party (United States) organizations
- Demographics of the Democratic Party (United States)
- History of the Democratic Party (United States)
- Political positions of the Democratic Party (United States)

United States politics

- Libertarian Democrat
- List of socialist members of the United States Congress
- Factions in the Libertarian Party (United States)
- Factions in the Republican Party (United States)

Additional notable groups of Democrat elected officials

- "The Squad"
- Blue Dog Coalition
