= Clintonian =

Clintonian may refer to:

- Clintonism, following the policies of American president Bill Clinton
- supporters of DeWitt Clinton (1769–1828), Governor of New York
