= New Covenant (disambiguation) =

The New Covenant is a core theological concept in Christianity.

New Covenant may also refer to:

- New Covenant (politics), a political slogan and concept from the Clinton presidency in US politics
- New Covenant Theology, a particular theological view in Christianity of redemptive history comparable to Covenant theology and Dispensationalism
- New Testament, the second major division of Christian scripture
