= Liberal Party (Philippines) =

Liberal political party in the Philippines

Liberal Party Partido Liberal ng Pilipinas
- Abbreviation: LP (Note: Even though "LP" is used as its official abbreviation, the term "Liberal" is also used as abbreviation, especially in Wikipedia's election results)
- President: Erin Tañada
- Chair: Leila de Lima
- Secretary-General: Kit Belmonte
- Chair Emeritus: Kiko Pangilinan
- Founders: Manuel Roxas; Elpidio Quirino; José Avelino
- Founded: January 19, 1946; 80 years ago
- Legalised: 1946
- Split from: Nacionalista
- Headquarters: AGS Building, EDSA, Guadalupe Viejo, Makati City, NCR
- Think tank: Center for Liberalism and Democracy
- Youth wing: Liberal Youth
- Membership (February 2025): 20,000
- Ideology: Liberalism (Filipino); Social liberalism; Progressivism; Aquinoism
- Political position: Centre to centre-left
- National affiliation: KiBam (2025) Former: UNIDO (1980–1986); Laban (1987); Koalisyong Pambansa (1992); PPC (2001); K4 (2004); Genuine Opposition (2007); Liberal (2010); Team PNoy (2013); Daang Matuwid (2016); Otso Diretso (2019); TRoPa (2022)
- Regional affiliation: Council of Asian Liberals and Democrats
- International affiliation: Liberal International
- Sectoral party: Mamamayang Liberal
- Colors: Blue Red Yellow; Buff (customary)
- Slogan: Bago. Bukas. Liberal. (since 2020)
- Senate: 1 / 24
- House of Representatives: 6 / 318
- Provincial Governors: 2 / 82
- Provincial Vice Governors: 1 / 82
- Provincial board members: 14 / 840

Website
- liberal.ph

The Liberal Party of the Philippines (Filipino: Partido Liberal ng Pilipinas, LP or Liberal) is a liberal political party in the Philippines.

Founded on January 19, 1946, by Manuel Roxas, Elpidio Quirino, and José Avelino from the breakaway liberal wing of the old Nacionalista, the Liberal Party remains the second-oldest active political party in the Philippines after the Nacionalista, and the oldest continually active party. The Liberals served as the governing party of four Philippine presidents: Manuel Roxas, Elpidio Quirino, Diosdado Macapagal, and Benigno Aquino III.

As a vocal opposition party to the dictatorship of their former member Ferdinand Marcos, it reemerged as a major political party after the People Power Revolution and the establishment of the Fifth Republic. It subsequently served as a senior member of President Corazon Aquino's UNIDO coalition. Upon Corazon Aquino's death in 2009, the party regained popularity, winning the 2010 Philippine presidential election under Benigno Aquino III, serving from 2010 to 2016. This was the only instance the party had won the presidency since the end of the Marcos dictatorship, however, it lost control of the office to Rodrigo Duterte of PDP–Laban in the 2016 presidential election and became the leading opposition party once again. Its vice presidential candidate Leni Robredo won in the same election, narrowly beating Marcos' son by a small margin.

In the 2019 midterm elections, the party remained the primary opposition party of the Philippines, holding three seats in the Senate. The Liberals was the largest party outside of Rodrigo Duterte's supermajority, holding 18 seats in the House of Representatives after 2019. In local government, the party held two provincial governorships and five vice governorships. The general election of 2022, however, was a setback for the party, which lost both the Presidency and Vice-Presidency, as well as all of its seats in the Senate, and saw its representation in the House of Representatives reduced.

The Liberals remains an influential organization in contemporary Philippine politics. With moderately progressive positions on social issues and centrist positions on economic issues, it is commonly associated with the post-revolution, liberal-democratic status quo of the Philippines in contrast to authoritarianism, conservatism, and socialism. Aside from presidents, the party has been led by liberal thinkers and politicians including Benigno Aquino Jr., Jovito Salonga, Raul Daza, Florencio Abad, Franklin Drilon, and Mar Roxas. Two of its members, Corazon Aquino and Leila de Lima, have received the prestigious Prize For Freedom, one of the highest international awards for liberal and democratic politicians since 1985 given by Liberal International. The Liberal Party is a member of the Council of Asian Liberals and Democrats and Liberal International.

== History ==
=== Roxas presidency: 1946–1948 ===
==== 1946 elections: The Rise of Manuel Roxas ====
The Liberal Party started as the "Liberal Wing" of the Nacionalista Party, led by Manuel Roxas and Elpidio Quirino. The Liberal Wing is formed due to Roxas' intention to run as president in the 1946 Philippine presidential election which he, and his supporters called and lobbied to the United States Congress to be early. When President Sergio Osmeña was officially selected as the Nacionalista Party's presidential nominee, Roxas and Quirino officially split from the party and founded the Liberal Party on January 19, 1946. Roxas and Quirino were the party's presidential and vice presidential nominee respectively, and were victorious over the administration ticket of Osmeña and Amang Rodriguez. After their presidential election performance, they dominated the House elections won the majority of 49 seats, and the senate race in 1947 winning six over eight seats.

=== Quirino to Magsaysay's presidency: 1948–1957 ===
==== 1948: Quirino succeeds Roxas, but facing impeachment attempt ====
After the death of President Roxas on April 15, 1948, at Clark Air Base, Pampanga, due to multiple heart attacks, Elpidio Quirino assumed the presidency.

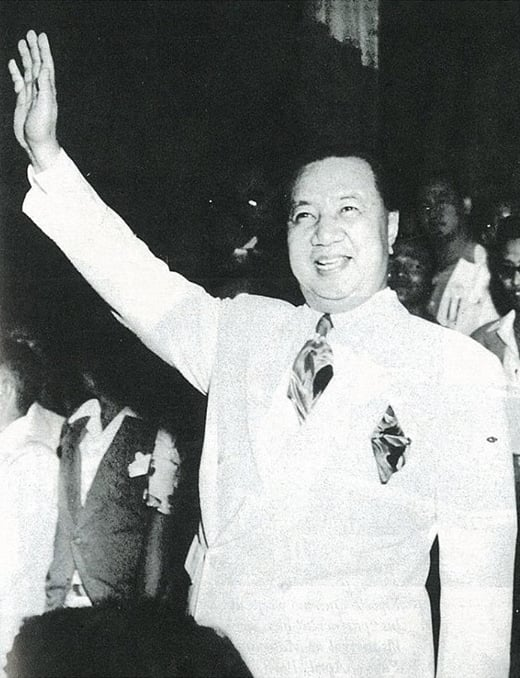
Quirino waving to the crowd

Riding on the crest of the growing wave of resentment against Liberal, a move was next hatched to indict President Quirino himself.

A committee of seven members of the House of Representatives, led by Congressman Agripino Escareal, drafted a five-count complaint that ranged from exorbitant spending to nepotism. A seven-member committee led by Representative Lorenzo Sumulong was created by Speaker Eugenio Pérez to investigate the charges before they were submitted to the Senate, serving as an impeachment body. Felix Angelo Bautista, the Solicitor General, arrived as the top executive's defense attorney. Following several hearings, on April 19, 1949, after a rather turbulent session that lasted all night, the congressional committee reached a verdict completely exonerating the President.

==== 1949 elections: Quirino reelected ====
For the 1949 elections, Quirino got the nomination of the party, while Jose Avelino, the senate leader of the party ran under his own wing of the party. Quirino choose Fernando Lopez as vice presidential nominee while Avelino selected Senator Vicente Francisco. Qurino and Lopez won the election over Nacionalista's Jose P. Laurel (who is the president of the Japanese puppet-Republic) and Manuel Briones, and Avelino and Francisco. But the said election is considered as one of the dirtiest, with violence and fraud taking place. As the news reports said that opponent's supporters are either beaten up by Quirino's supporters or the local police. In the Senate, they swept out the whole 8 member ticket, while still maintaining majority at the House.

==== 1953 elections: Magsaysay out, Liberal stumbled ====
For the 1953 elections, Liberal stalwart Ramon Magsaysay, who was recruited by founding member Roxas to fill the party with fresh names, wanted to seize the presidential nomination of the party. But Quirino still had plans for re-election. Another Liberal also wants to challenge Quirino as the presidential nominee, the country's representative to the United Nations Carlos P. Romulo. Quirino was officially selected by the party, with José Yulo as his running-mate, because Lopez will join Romulo and his supporter's walk-out march out of the party. Magsaysay jumped to the Nacionalistas and got the party's nomination over one of its stalwarts Senate President Camilo Osías (who also jumped to Liberal with Jose Zulueta), on April 12, 1953. Romulo and Lopez founded the Democratic Party on May 29, 1953, with the two founders selected as their presidential and vice presidential nominee. But later, the two cancelled their candidacy and supported Magsaysay's candidacy.

Quirino's campaign was bombarded with controversies and issues, like with one of the party's members, Negros Occidental Governor Rafael Lacson, a corrupt politician who killed Moises Padilla, his challenger in 1951 elections, and friend of Magsaysay who was popularized by a photograph taken with Magsaysay carrying Padilla's dead body, and also being used by the latter in his campaign. Other issues like allegedly owning a golden arinola, corruption and nepotism, being out of touch to the masses due to his lavish lifestyle, and unresolving the Huk rebellion. Magsaysay and his running mate Carlos Garcia won the election by a landslide. In the senate, the whole Liberal slate was kicked out in the Magic 8, thus not winning any seats, while in the House they only won 31 seats. In 1955 Senate elections, no Liberal again won any seat in the Senate.

=== Garcia to Macapagal's presidency: 1957–1965 ===
==== 1957 elections: Rise of Diosdado Macapagal ====
After the death of Magsaysay, and the succession of Garcia, Liberal fielded their former 1953 Vice Presidential nominee José Yulo, with Kapampangan 1st district Congressman Diosdado Macapagal as his running mate for the 1957 presidential elections. In a four-way race, Yulo lost to incumbent Garcia, but Macapagal managed to defeat former House Speaker Pepito Laurel. For the first time in Philippine electoral history, the winning president did not have a vice president who came from the same party.

==== 1961 elections: Liberal prevailed ====
For the 1961 elections, Ilocano Senator Ferdinand Marcos aimed for the nomination of the party to challenge Garcia's re-election bid, but Vice President Macapagal was also eyeing for the nomination. Later, in January 1961, Marcos and Macapagal agreed that the latter will be the presidential nominee, while Marcos will be the new party president replacing Macapagal. Macapagal promised that he will only run for one term, and Marcos will become the party's nominee. Macapagal challenged Garcia, choosing young Senator Emmanuel Pelaez. The two managed to defeat the administration ticket of Garcia and Senator Gil Puyat.

==== Stonehill Scandal ====
In 1962, a bribery scandal shook the country which involved some Liberal politicians, including President Macapagal, and then-Senate President Marcos. The bribery money was from a certain Harry Stonehill, an American businessman and former military officer of the United States who settled in the Philippines to open a business. But, after an argument with Meinhart Spielman, the general manager of his Philippine Tobacco Corporation, he physically assaulted Spielman, and the latter revealed to the Senate a "blue book" that listed all involved Filipino politicians. But while Justice Secretary Jose "Pepe" Diokno investigated the scandal, Although his trust rating suffered significantly, President Macapagal eventually ordered the deportation of Stonehill. Diokno later ran for the Senate under the Nacionalista Party.

=== Marcos' first two terms: 1965–1972 ===
==== 1965 elections: Broken promise, Marcos out ====
After Diosdado Macapagal announced that he plans to run for re-election in 1965, Marcos, just like Magsaysay, switched to the Nacionalistas by April 1964, and was selected as its presidential nominee. Meanwhile, Macapagal selected Gerardo Roxas, son of the founder to be his running-mate. Macapagal and Roxas' campaigned focused against Marcos' false military medals. The two eventually failed, and Marcos won the presidency alongside his running mate Fernando Lopez, Quirino's vice president and former member of the Liberal Party.

==== 1967 elections: Rise of Ninoy Aquino ====
In the 1967 elections, Ninoy Aquino, a former Nacionalista and a known associate of Ramon Magsaysay, was the only one from the Liberal slate who won a seat in the Senate, garnering 49.52% of the votes.

==== 1969 elections: Dirty elections faced ====
In the 1969 elections, Liberal fielded Serging Osmeña, son of the Nacionalista Party founder Sergio Osmeña as their presidential nominee. Osmeña ran for the vice presidency in 1961 as an independent and placed second. The party also recruited Magsaysay's brother Genaro to be his running-mate. Both of them lost to the incumbents, but the election was considered as one of the dirtiest in Philippine election history.

==== 1971: The Plaza Miranda bombing ====
After the Plaza Miranda bombing, the Liberals won five seats. In the Manila mayoral election, the party chose Congressman Ramon Bagatsing instead of incumbent Antonio Villegas. Villegas left the party, and Bagatsing won the mayoral election.

=== Martial law and Fourth Republic era ===
==== Being threat to Marcos ====
During the days leading to the declaration of martial law, Marcos would find his former party as a potential roadblock to his quest for one-man rule. Led by Ninoy Aquino, Gerry Roxas and Jovito Salonga, Liberal would hound President Marcos on issues like human rights and the curtailment of freedoms. Even after Marcos' declaration of martial law, the party continued to oppose the regime, and many of its leaders and members would be prosecuted and even killed during this time.

==== 1978 elections ====
For the incoming 1978 parliamentary elections, some Liberal Party members joined the Kilusang Bagong Lipunan, a regime-controlled coalition, while others joined Ninoy Aquino's Lakas ng Bayan (LABAN). With many preferring not to be involved, the Liberal went to hibernation, but the party became more liberal during this era.

==== 1981 boycott ====
After Marcos lifted Martial Law with Proclamation 2045, on January 17, 1981, the Liberal Party joined the United Nationalist Democratic Organization (UNIDO), the main coalition of the opposition. But UNIDO and LABAN declared a boycott due to Marcos' refusal of their demands, i.e a cleaner voters' list, a revamp of the Commission on Elections (COMELEC), and the accreditation of UNIDO as the minority. This dismayed Marcos, as he could not legitimize the election without a viable opposition candidate.

==== 1986 snap elections ====
Liberal stalwarts joined UNIDO along with Nacionalista and PDP–Laban, and supported the candidacy of Cory Aquino and Doy Laurel for the 1986 election. During the election, violence was rampant and reports of cheating, vote-rigging, and other controversies arose, with COMELEC officers walking out of the PICC, the place where the COMELEC transmission of data happened. The election victory of Marcos prompted the People Power Revolution in February 25 of the same year.

=== First Aquino to Estrada's presidency: 1986–1992 ===
==== Under Aquino Administration ====
After the People Power Revolution and the restoration of democracy, some of the Liberal stalwarts were instrumental in ending more than half a century of US military presence in the Philippines with its campaign in the 1991 senate to reject a new RP-US Bases Treaty which was mainly led by Jovito Salonga. This ironically cost the party dearly, losing the elections of 1992.

==== 1992 elections ====
Liberal and PDP–Laban formed a coalition named Koalisyong Pambansa, and supported the candidacy of Salonga as president, and Nene Pimentel as vice president for the 1992 Elections. They lost to Aquino's preferred candidates, Defense Secretary Fidel Ramos, and Senator Joseph Estrada.

==== 1995 elections ====
Liberal won 5 seats in the House elections, but the party did not have any senatorial candidate.

==== 1998 elections: Alfredo Lim ====
In 1998, Liberal fielded Manila Mayor Alfredo Lim as their presidential candidate, with Serge Osmeña, as his running mate. The two were supported by former president Corazon Aquino. But the tandem lost to Vice President Joseph Estrada and Senator Gloria Macapagal Arroyo, daughter of their 1961 presidential nominee respectively.

==== EDSA Dos ====
In 2000, the Liberal Party was opposed to the Estrada administration, actively supporting the Resign-Impeach-Oust initiatives that led to People Power II.

=== Arroyo's presidency: 2001–2010 ===
==== 2001: People Power Coalition ====
After the resignation and ouster of Estrada, the Liberal Party joined the administration's People Power Coalition for the 2001 elections, with former Quezon City councilor Kiko Pangilinan and former Senator Bobby Tañada as the party's senatorial candidates. Only Pangilinan managed to win, placing 8th with 10,971,896 votes.

==== 2004: K-4 and Rise of Mar Roxas ====
For the 2004 elections, Liberal joined the K-4 coalition of President Arroyo, with Gerry Roxas' son, former congressman Mar Roxas and senator Rodolfo Biazon as their candidates. They both won, with Roxas topping the election, while Biazon placed 12th. Biazon's victory was protested by 13th placer Senator Robert Barbers (who is also a K-4 member), but the case filed by Barbers was later dismissed.

==== 2007 elections: GO and Noynoy ====
After the revelation that Arroyo cheated in the presidential elections through the Hello Garci scandal, many Liberal members who were part of Arroyo's resigned in 2005, thus joining the opposition, including party stalwart Butch Abad. For the 2007 elections, the Liberal Party fielded Noynoy Aquino, a congressman from Tarlac and the son of Ninoy and Cory Aquino. Kiko Pangilinan also ran for re-election in senate as an independent but still under Liberal, after being kicked out by Genuine Opposition (GO), which Aquino is a member. Aquino managed to win the senate elections, placing 6th and Pangilinan placed 5th.

==== Drilon-Roxas wing vs Atienza wing ====
Some Liberal members installed Manila Mayor Lito Atienza as party president on March 2, 1998, even though former congressman and then-senatorial candidate Raul Daza was still officially serving as the party president. What the pro-Atienza wing did triggered a leadership struggle and a party schism that lasted after Daza's leadership.

The Liberal Party met on November 27, 2007, to decide who would succeed Franklin Drilon as the party president and to hold an election for his replacement. Both Noynoy Aquino and his Senate colleague Mar Roxas received nominations, but Aquino emerged victorious as the party's president, while Roxas is set to be the presidential nominee. The former chairman and head of the "Atienza faction" or "Pro-Arroyo faction," DENR secretary Lito Atienza, congratulated him, but he later condemned the election and referred to Drilon and his supporters as a "merry cabal of destabilizers". He added that the other group had disregarded the Supreme Court's injunction to maintain the status quo. Later, Supreme Court recognized the Drilon Wing as the sole legitimate wing of the Liberal.

=== Liberal's resurgence under Noynoy Aquino's presidency: 2010–2016 ===
==== 2010: Benigno "Noynoy" Aquino III administration ====
The Liberal Party regained influence when it nominated then-Senator Benigno Aquino III as their candidate for the 2010 Philippine presidential election after the Corazon Aquino's death that subsequently showed a groundswell of support for his candidacy. Even though the party had earlier nominated Mar Roxas to be its presidential candidate for the 2010 Philippine general election, Roxas gave way to Aquino and instead ran for vice president. The party was able to field new members breaking away from the then-ruling party Lakas–Kampi–CMD, becoming the largest minority party in Congress. Aquino would later win by plurality, and Liberal would become the majority party in Congress.

But, some incidents like the appointment of party president Jun Abaya and mismanagement of the Department of Transportation and Communications (DOTC) cost the party's next presidential elections.

==== 'Twerk na daan' controversy ====
On October 1, 2015, during an oath-taking event and birthday celebration of Liberal Congressman Benjamin Agarao of Laguna's 4th district, MMDA Chairman Francis Tolentino hired an all-girl dance group Playgirls to perform at the said event. One of the dancers was seen on the top of an unidentified male who was lying on his back simulating a sexual act or twerking, and the said event had minors in the audience. Liberal leader Mar Roxas, who was absent at the said event, started an investigation about the incident, while labor groups and some women's rights advocates filed charges against Tolentino. The said controversy was coined by columnists and critics as 'Twerk na Daan' (which was combination of the word "twerk" and "Tuwid na daan" campaign of Aquino).

==== 2016 elections: Oras Na, Roxas Na! ====
In the 2016 presidential elections, the Liberal Party nominated former Department of Transportation and Communications (DoTC) and Department of the Interior and Local Government (DILG) secretary Mar Roxas, and Leni Robredo, a representative from Naga City and widow of Jesse Robredo, the DILG secretary who preceded Roxas, as the party's presidential and vice presidential candidates. Roxas was defeated by former member Rodrigo Duterte of PDP–Laban, but Robredo managed to win. Most of the party's members either switched allegiance to PDP–Laban, joined a supermajority alliance but retained their Liberal membership (with some defecting later), joined the "recognized minority", or created an opposition bloc called "Magnificent 7".

=== Liberal purge under Duterte's presidency: 2016–2022 ===
==== Post-2016 elections ====
After its loss in the 2016 elections, as early as February 2017, the leaders of the Liberal chose to focus on rebuilding the party by inviting sectoral representation of non-politicians in its membership numbers. Since then the party had been inducting new members who were non-politicians, some of whom applied online through the party's website. Also, Senator Leila de Lima, who was pushing probe into alleged extrajudicial deaths in the early months of Duterte's war on drugs, was arrested in 2017 based on charges linked to a drug trafficking scandal in the New Bilibid Prison, which the party claimed as only a product of harassment and trumped-up charges against opposing the president. It then prompted them to review its party rules and principles.

==== 2019 elections: Otso Diretso ====
Before the 2019 general elections, the Liberal Party formed Otso Diretso, an electoral coalition of eight candidates for the senate race; led by the party, the coalition also comprised members of the Magdalo, Akbayan, and Aksyon. None of the eight senatorial candidates under Otso Diretso won a seat, however; it was the first time in the history of the current bicameral composition of the Philippine Congress under the 1987 Constitution that the opposition failed to win a seat in one of the chambers, and the second time that a Liberal-led coalition suffered a great loss since 1955.

==== 2022: Leni Robredo's presidential campaign ====
For the 2022 Philippine presidential election, the Liberal Party nominated Leni Robredo and Francis Pangilinan for the presidential and vice presidential posts, respectively. The party led the Team Robredo–Pangilinan (TRoPa) alliance, which included incumbent senator De Lima, other members of the Liberal, and several guest candidates from other parties such as Akbayan, as well as independents. Robredo ran as an independent candidate whilst remaining affiliated with Liberal. Both candidates lost the election to Bongbong Marcos and Sara Duterte, respectively, finishing second. While some candidates from the Liberal-led alliance were elected, no candidate from the party won a seat in the senatorial elections, for the first time since the 1995 elections.

=== Second Marcos presidency: 2022–present ===
==== 2025: KiBam and Mamamayang Liberal ====
In May 2024, Bam Aquino left Liberal to pursue the Senate race as an independent candidate, but later joined the Katipunan ng Nagkakaisang Pilipino (KNP) and became its party chair. In the same year, several Liberals led by De Lima formed a sectoral wing called Mamamayang Liberal (ML) for the 2025 House of Representatives elections for party-list seats. De Lima, who was released from detainment in November 2023, was selected as ML's first nominee. Former senator and vice presidential candidate Kiko Pangilinan was the Liberal's sole candidate for the senatorial elections. Pangilinan and the Liberals formed a coalition with the KNP to form a coalition duo with Bam Aquino for the 2025 senate election.

The duo won the senate race and entered the magic 12 as Aquino ranked 2nd and Pangilinan ranked 5th, resulting in their return to the upper house. Additionally, the Mamamayang Liberal won the party-list race, garnering over 500,000 votes and guaranteeing one seat in the House of Representatives. Even though de Lima joined the minority in the House, Aquino and Pangilinan joined the majority in the Senate.

== Ideology ==
While the Liberal Party defines its ideology as social liberalism, the party has often been described as a "centrist" or "liberal" party. Historically, the Liberal Party has been evaluated as a "conservative" party, with an ideology similar to or indistinguishable from the Nacionalista Party's ideology, until it became the opposition party under the Marcos dictatorship, wherein it became more liberal. Being a founding member of the Council of Asian Liberals and Democrats and a full member of Liberal International, the Liberal Party advocates the values of "freedom, justice and solidarity (bayanihan)," as described in the party's values charter. Although this may be deemed theoretically true since the party's founding in 1946, it became more tangible through the party's position of continuing dissent during the Marcos dictatorship.

Since 2017, the party has opened party membership to the general public and to key sectors of society, aiming to harness a large volunteering base. According to the party, this aims to ostensibly build on "the promise of becoming a true people's party".

== Current political positions ==
The party has declared policies geared toward inclusiveness and people empowerment. It also advocates and supports secure jobs, food, shelter, universal health care, public education access, and other social services, and is against extrajudicial killings, any challenge to the rule of law, and curtailments of human rights strictures. The party also aims to form an open government with participatory democracy, positions that have been supported by the party's recent leaders.

=== Economic policy ===
- Improve social safety nets.
- Impose 1% wealth tax on individuals with net value assets exceeding ₱1 billion.
- Create tax exemptions for selected products.
- Maximize the budget windfall of local governments for antipoverty projects.
- Increase minimum wages.
- Declare and address an "education crisis", increase the education budget to 6% of GDP, streamline teachers' function, and establish special education (SPED) centers in all public schools.
- Develop an inter-sectoral approach and convergence of roles for the attainment of a functioning universal health care, provide due fixed allowances and statutory benefits to barangay health workers, and fix the corruption in PhilHealth.
- Prioritize infrastructure for spurring rural development, transportation, water resource management, and climate resilience, funded through public-private partnerships rather than loans.
- Upgrade science and technology research and development funding and promote data-driven agriculture.
- Invest in subsidies to promote renewable energy and implement better waste disposal to mitigate sea pollution.
- Prioritize a job guarantee program and expand coverage of the SSS and Pag-Ibig.
- Promote financial literacy.
- Offer voucher programs for access to private colleges and universities.
- Enact a law calling for equal participation of women in the economy and in decision-making positions, both in public and private organizations.
- Addressing systemic corruption in government.

=== Social ===
- Cleaner air and water and sustainable arable land as well as extensive programs against climate change.

== Legal issues ==
Senator Leila de Lima, who led an investigation into alleged extrajudicial deaths in the early months of Duterte's war on drugs, was issued an arrest warrant in 2017 based on charges linked to the New Bilibid Prison drug trafficking scandal, which the party claimed was based on trumped-up charges, labelling the arrest "patently illegal". While on the whole, de Lima's investigation was seen by some pundits as an adversarial investigation that was a strategic mistake, others in the party simply saw it as a call to a review of the party's principles and how members have adhered to them.

Senator De Lima has been fully acquitted of all criminal charges on June 24, 2024, marking the end of her legal battle and detention that lasted over six years. De Lima, a prominent critic of former President Rodrigo Duterte, described the charges as politically motivated to silence her investigations into Duterte's controversial drug war and alleged human rights abuses.

In 2019, the party, along with other groups, was accused of planning a coup against the Duterte government. The party denounced the allegation and called it a state-sponsored threat of legal abuse, demanding the government provide evidence to back the claims.

== Symbols ==
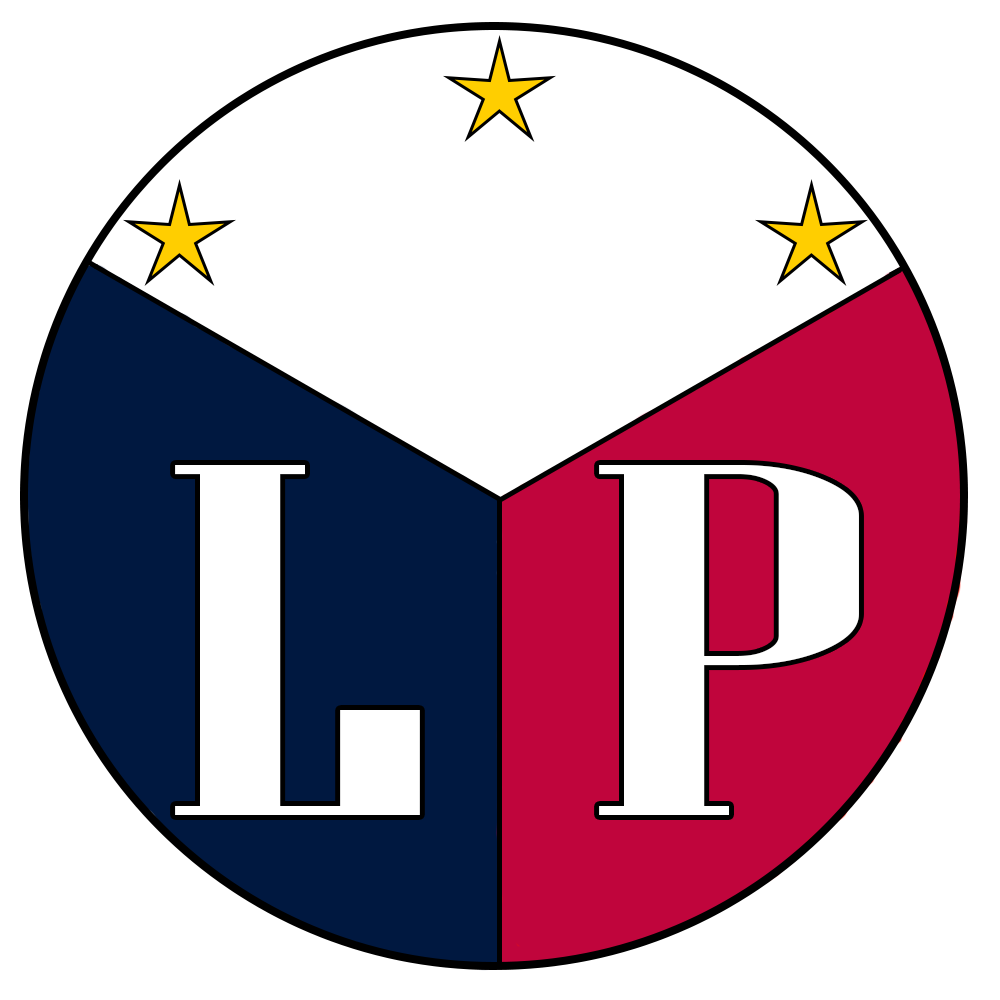
Logo from 1953 to 1965

Logo from 1965 to 2010 and from 2016 to 2021

Logo from 2010 to 2016

The Liberal Party is associated with the color yellow, a political color commonly associated with liberalism. During the People Power Revolution, opposition parties against the Marcos dictatorship, including the Liberal, used yellow ribbons as a symbol of resistance and support for Ninoy Aquino, one of the leading politicians against the regime. The color would later be co-opted by his son, Benigno Aquino III, as well as the Liberal, for his presidential campaign in 2010, which he later won.

After his presidency, yellow continued to be associated with the party, which became the leading opposition party against the presidency of their former member Rodrigo Duterte. The pejorative term dilawan (transl. yellowed ones), associated with the liberal elite, has been used against the party and other critics of the Duterte administration. In an effort to distance herself from the negative connotations of the color and unite various opposition groups, then party chair Leni Robredo adopted the color pink for her presidential campaign. Both pink and yellow are currently used by the party.

== Liberal presidents ==
As of 2024, there have been a total of 4 Liberal presidents. Those who won presidency under other parties are not included.

#	Name (lifespan)	Portrait	Province	Presidency start date	Presidency end date	Time in office
3	Manuel Roxas (1892–1948)		Capiz	May 28, 1946 (Note: Inauguration as President of Commonwealth)	April 15, 1948 (Note: Died in office.)	1 year, 323 days
4	Elpidio Quirino (1890–1956)		Ilocos Sur	April 17, 1948	December 30, 1953	5 years, 257 days
9	Diosdado Macapagal (1910–1997)		Pampanga	December 30, 1961	December 30, 1965	4 years, 0 days
15	Benigno Aquino III (1960–2021)		Tarlac	June 30, 2010	June 30, 2016	6 years, 0 days

== Party leadership ==
=== Current Party Officials ===
- Chairperson Emeritus: Francis Pangilinan, Senator (2026–present)
- Chairperson: Leila de Lima, Mamamayang Liberal representative (2026–present)
- President: Erin Tañada, former Quezon's 4th district representative (2004–2013)
- Executive Vice President: Krisel Lagman, Albay's 1st district representative (2025–present)
- Treasurer: Alfonso Umali Jr., Oriental Mindoro's 2nd district representative (2019–present)
- Secretary-General: Kit Belmonte, former Quezon City's 6th district representative (2013–2022)

=== Party Presidents ===
#	Image	Name	Start of term	End of term
1		Manuel Roxas	January 19, 1946	April 15, 1948
2		José Avelino	April 19, 1948	May 8, 1949
3		Elpidio Quirino	April 17, 1949	December 30, 1950
4		Eugenio Pérez	December 30, 1950	December 30, 1957
5		Diosdado Macapagal	December 30, 1957	January 21, 1961
6		Ferdinand E. Marcos	January 21, 1961	April 1964
7		Cornelio T. Villareal	April 1964	May 10, 1969
8		Gerardo Roxas	May 10, 1969	April 19, 1982
9		Jovito Salonga	April 20, 1982	June 1, 1993
10		Wigberto Tañada	June 2, 1993	October 17, 1994
11		Raul A. Daza	October 18, 1994	September 19, 1999
12		Florencio Abad	September 20, 1999	August 9, 2004
13		Franklin Drilon	August 10, 2004	November 5, 2007
14		Mar Roxas	November 6, 2007	September 30, 2012
15		Joseph Emilio Abaya	October 1, 2012	August 7, 2016
16		Kiko Pangilinan	August 8, 2016	September 30, 2022
17		Edcel Lagman	September 30, 2022	January 30, 2025
Act		Erin Tañada	January 30, 2025	January 24, 2026
18		Erin Tañada	January 24, 2026	Incumbent

== Elected members ==
=== 20th Congress (2025-present) ===
==== Senators ====
Senators of Liberal in 2025
Name	Took office	Bloc
Kiko Pangilinan	June 30, 2025	Majority

==== District Representatives ====
District Representatives of Liberal in 2025
Name	District	Took office	Bloc
Krisel Lagman	Albay's 1st congressional district	June 30, 2025	Minority
Edgar Erice	Caloocan's 2nd congressional district	June 30, 2025	Minority
Kaka Bag-ao	Dinagat Islands's at-large congressional district	June 30, 2025	Minority
Jaime Fresnedi	Muntinlupa's at-large congressional district	June 30, 2022	Majority
Alfonso Umali Jr.	Oriental Mindoro's 2nd congressional district	June 30, 2019	Majority
Ian Amatong	Zamboanga del Norte's 3rd congressional district	June 20, 2022	Majority

==== Partylist Representatives ====
Partylist Representatives of Liberal in 2025
Name	Partylist	Took office	Bloc
Leila de Lima	Mamamayang Liberal (ML)	June 30, 2025	Minority

==== Governors ====
Provincial Governors of Liberal in 2025
Name	Province	Took office
Mujiv Hataman	Basilan	June 30, 2025
Trina Firmalo-Fabic	Romblon	June 30, 2025

==== Mayors ====
City/Municipal Mayors of Liberal in 2025
Name	Province	Took office
Meg Constantino	Abra de Ilog, Occidental Mindoro	June 30, 2025
Tin Antonio	Alcala, Cagayan	June 30, 2025
Nestor Archival	Cebu City	June 30, 2025
Sonia Arnado	Kauswagan, Lanao del Norte	June 30, 2025
Glicerio Almero, III	Mamburao, Occidental Mindoro	June 30, 2025
Leni Robredo	Naga City, Camarines Sur	June 30, 2025
Shimonette Francisco	New Washington, Aklan	June 30, 2025
Celsa Rivera	Padre Garcia, Batangas	June 30, 2025
Joe Abad Lazaro	San Joaquin, Iloilo	June 30, 2025
Bartolome Rivera	San Mateo, Rizal	June 30, 2025

== Electoral performance ==
=== Presidential elections ===
Year	Candidate	Votes	%	Result	Outcome
1946	Manuel Roxas	1,333,006	53.93	Won	Manuel Roxas won
1949	Elpidio Quirino (Note: In 1949, the Liberal Party was split into two wings, one led by Quirino or the "Quirino wing", and another led by Avelino or the "Avelino wing".)	1,803,808	50.93	Won	Elpidio Quirino won
1949	José Avelino	419,890	11.85	Lost	Elpidio Quirino won
1953	Elpidio Quirino	1,313,991	31.08	Lost	Ramon Magsaysay (Nacionalista) won
1957	José Yulo	1,386,829	27.62	Lost	Carlos P. Garcia (Nacionalista) won
1957	Antonio Quirino (Note: Quirino ran under his own wing of the Liberal Party, while the rest of the party supported Yulo's candidacy.)	60,328	1.20	Lost	Carlos P. Garcia (Nacionalista) won
1961	Diosdado Macapagal	3,554,840	55.00	Won	Diosdado Macapagal won
1965	Diosdado Macapagal	3,187,752	42.88	Lost	Ferdinand Marcos (Nacionalista) won
1969	Sergio Osmeña Jr.	3,143,122	38.51	Lost	Ferdinand Marcos (Nacionalista) won
1981	Not participating			—N/a	Ferdinand Marcos (KBL) won
1986	None; main wing endorsed Corazon Aquino (UNIDO), while Kalaw had no running mate.			Disputed	Corazon Aquino assumed presidency
1992	Jovito Salonga	2,302,123	10.16	Lost	Fidel V. Ramos (Lakas–NUCD) won
1998	Alfredo Lim	2,344,362	8.71	Lost	Joseph Estrada (LAMMP) won
2004	None; endorsed Gloria Macapagal Arroyo (Lakas–CMD)			—N/a	Gloria Macapagal Arroyo (Lakas–CMD) won
2010	Benigno Aquino III	15,208,678	42.08	Won	Benigno Aquino III won
2016	Mar Roxas	9,978,175	23.45	Lost	Rodrigo Duterte (PDP–Laban) won
2022	Leni Robredo (Note: Ran as an independent candidate while retaining membership.)	15,035,773	27.94	Lost	Bongbong Marcos (PFP) won

=== Vice presidential elections ===
Year	Candidate	Votes	%	Result	Outcome
1946	Elpidio Quirino	1,161,725	52.36	Won	Elpidio Quirino won
1949	Fernando Lopez	1,341,284	52.19	Won	Fernando López won
1949	Vicente J. Francisco	44,510	1.73	Lost	Fernando López won
1953	José Yulo	1,483,802	37.10	Lost	Carlos P. Garcia (Nacionalista) won
1957	Diosdado Macapagal	2,189,197	46.55	Won	Diosdado Macapagal won
1961	Emmanuel Pelaez	2,394,400	37.57	Won	Emmanuel Pelaez won
1965	Gerardo Roxas	3,504,826	48.12	Lost	Fernando López (Nacionalista) won
1969	Genaro Magsaysay	2,968,526	37.54	Lost	Fernando López (Nacionalista) won
1981	Vice presidency abolished				
1986	None; main wing endorsed Salvador Laurel (UNIDO)			Disputed	Salvador Laurel (UNIDO) assumed vice presidency
1986	Eva Estrada Kalaw	662,185	3.31	Disputed	Salvador Laurel (UNIDO) assumed vice presidency
1992	None; Salonga's running mate was Aquilino Pimentel Jr. (PDP–Laban)	2,023,289	9.91	Lost	Joseph Estrada (NPC) won
1998	Serge Osmeña	2,351,462	9.20	Lost	Gloria Macapagal Arroyo (Lakas–NUCD–UMDP) won
2004	None; endorsed Noli de Castro (Independent)			—N/a	Noli de Castro (Independent) won
2010	Mar Roxas	13,918,490	39.58	Lost	Jejomar Binay (PDP–Laban) won
2016	Leni Robredo	14,418,817	35.11	Won	Leni Robredo won
2022	Francis Pangilinan	9,329,207	17.82	Lost	Sara Duterte (Lakas–CMD) won

=== Legislative elections ===
==== 1946–1972: Third Republic ====
Senate is abolished from 1972 to 1986

Senate election	Seats won	+/–	Result	President	Result	+/–	Seats	House election
1946	10 / 24	N/A	Minority	Manuel Roxas	Minority	N/A	49 / 98	1946
1947	15 / 24	▲6	Majority	Manuel Roxas	Minority	N/A	49 / 98	1946
1949	18 / 24	▲3	Majority	Elpidio Quirino	Majority	▲11	60 / 100	1949
1951	12 / 24	▼6	Majority	Elpidio Quirino	Majority	▲11	60 / 100	1949
1953	7 / 24	▼5	Minority	Ramon Magsaysay	Minority	▼35	31 / 102	1953
1955	0 / 24	▼4	Lost	Ramon Magsaysay	Minority	▼35	31 / 102	1953
1957	2 / 24	▲2	Minority	Carlos P. Garcia	Minority	▼40	19 / 102	1957
1959	4 / 24	▲2	Minority	Carlos P. Garcia	Minority	▼40	19 / 102	1957
1961	8 / 24	▲4	Minority	Diosdado Macapagal	Minority	▲10	29 / 104	1961
1963	10 / 24	▲2	Majority	Diosdado Macapagal	Minority	▲10	29 / 104	1961
1965	12 / 24	Steady	Minority	Ferdinand E. Marcos	Majority	▲32	61 / 104	1965
1967	7 / 24	▼3	Minority	Ferdinand E. Marcos	Majority	▲32	61 / 104	1965
1969	5 / 24	▼2	Minority	Ferdinand E. Marcos	Minority	▼43	18 / 110	1969
1971	8 / 24	▲3	Minority	Ferdinand E. Marcos	Minority	▼43	18 / 110	1969

==== 1978–1986: Batasang Pambansa ====
Year	Votes	%	Seats	+/–	Result
1978	Members ran as part of LABAN				
1984	Members ran as part of UNIDO				

==== 1987–present ====
House election	House Seats	+/–	Result	Senate election	Senate Seats	+/–	Result
1987	4 / 200	▲4	Majority	1987	Ran as part of LABAN Coalition	N/A	Majority
1992	11 / 200	▲7	Majority	1992	Ran as part of Koalisyong Pambansa	▼3	Majority
1995	5 / 226	▼6	Majority	1995	Not participating	Steady	—
1998	15 / 258	▲10	Majority	1998	0 / 12	Steady	Lost
2001	19 / 256	▲3	Majority	2001	1 / 13	▲1	Majority
2004	29 / 261	▲10	Majority	2004	2 / 12	▲3	Majority
2007	23 / 270	▼6	Majority	2007	2 / 12	Steady	Split
2010	47 / 286	▲14	Majority	2010	3 / 12	Steady	Majority
2013	109 / 292	▲62	Majority	2013	1 / 12	Steady	Majority
2016	115 / 297	▲6	Split	2016	5 / 12	▲2	Split
2019	18 / 304	▼97	Minority	2019	0 / 12	▼3	Minority
2022	10 / 316	▼8	Split	2022	0 / 12	▼3	Lost
2025	12 / 317	▲2	Split	2025	1 / 12	▲1	Majority

== Notable Liberals ==
=== Philippine presidents ===
- Manuel Roxas (5th President of the Philippines; one of the co-founders)
- Elpidio Quirino (6th President of the Philippines) – also the 2nd Vice President of the Philippines
- Ramon Magsaysay (7th President of the Philippines) – Magsaysay won in 1953 as the Candidate of the Nacionalista, although he was former Liberal member and in fact he served as President Quirino's Secretary of Department of National Defense.
- Diosdado Macapagal (9th President of the Philippines)
- Ferdinand Marcos (10th President of the Philippines) – Like Magsaysay, Marcos won as the presidential candidate of the Liberal's rival Nacionalista in 1965, the party to which Marcos joined after failing to get the Liberal nomination from Macapagal.
- Joseph Estrada (13th President of the Philippines) – A member of the Liberal Party when he was a senator from 1987 to 1991.
- Benigno Aquino III (15th President of the Philippines)
- Rodrigo Duterte (16th President of the Philippines) – A former party chair of Davao City chapter from 2009, Duterte left the party in 2015. He won the presidency in 2016 under the PDP–Laban ticket.

=== Philippine vice presidents ===
- Fernando Lopez (3rd and 7th vice president of the Philippines) – Lopez was a Liberal when he was the 3rd Vice President, while a Nacionalista member as the 7th Vice President
- Emmanuel Pelaez (6th vice president of the Philippines)
- Leni Robredo (14th vice president of the Philippines)

=== Others ===
- List of Liberal Party (Philippines) members

== See also ==
- Democratic Party (Philippines), defunct breakaway party from Liberal existed from 1953 to 1957
- Mamamayang Liberal, LP-affiliated party-list
- List of major liberal parties considered left
