= List of Liberal Party (Philippines) members =

This is a list of Liberal Party (Philippines) members.

- Gerardo Roxas Sr. (Senator; Liberal leader during the Marcos Sr. dictatorship)
- Macario Peralta Jr. (World War II Hero, Philippine Army General, Senator of the Philippines, Secretary of National Defense)
- Fernando Lopez (3rd and 7th Vice President of the Philippines under Elpidio Quirino and Ferdinand Marcos Sr. and Senator)
- Cesar Climaco (Mayor of Zamboanga City, vocal critic and opponent of Martial Law)
- Benigno Aquino Jr. (Senator of the Philippines)
- Orly Mercado (Senator of the Philippines)
- Eva Estrada-Kalaw (Senator of the Philippines)
- Eddie Ilarde (Senator of the Philippines)
- Ramon Mitra Jr. (16th Speaker of the Philippine House of Representatives)
- Narciso Ramos (Philippine Secretary of Foreign Affairs; one of the co-founders)
- Ramon Bagatsing (longest-serving Mayor of Manila, Plaza Miranda bombing survivor)
- Martin B. Isidro (former Vice Mayor of Manila)
- Emmanuel Pelaez (6th Vice President of the Philippines, Philippine Secretary of Foreign Affairs; Philippine Ambassador to the United States of America, Senator of the Philippines)
- Rashid Lucman (former Representative of Lanao del Sur, Exposed the Jabidah massacre and other Marcos abuses in Congress)
- Ambrosio Padilla (former Senate President of the Philippines)
- Quintin Paredes (former Senate President of the Philippines)
- Jovito Salonga (former Senate President of the Philippines, survived the Plaza Miranda bombing)
- Manuel Roxas II (Senator of the Philippines, former Interior and Local Government Secretary and Transportation Secretary)
- Sergio Osmeña Jr. (Senator of the Philippines, former Mayor of Cebu City and 1969 presidential candidate)
- Sergio Osmeña III (Senator of the Philippines)
- John Henry Osmeña (Senator of the Philippines)
- Ramon Magsaysay (a Liberal member while serving as congressman for Zambales and Secretary of Defense under Elpidio Quirino, moved to Nacionalista for 1953 elections).
- Ramon Magsaysay Jr. (former senator and representative of the lone district of Zambales)
- Genaro Magsaysay (1969 vice presidential candidate, Senator of the Philippines under Nacionalista)
- Carlos P. Romulo (Philippine Ambassador to the United States and Secretary of Foreign Affairs)
- Enrique Magalona (Senator of the Philippines)
- Ferdinand E. Marcos (a Liberal while serving as congressman of Ilocos Norte, senator and Senate President; Former party president, moved to Nacionalista in 1964)
- José Avelino (Senator of the Philippines and 1949 presidential candidate under his own wing)
- Vicente Francisco (Senator of the Philippines and 1949 vice presidential candidate under Avelino wing)
- Lorenzo Tañada (former Minority leader of the Senate of the Philippines)
- Wigberto Tañada (former Minority leader of the Senate of the Philippines)
- Antonio Villegas (former Mayor of Manila)
- Pablo Gomez Sarino (former Mayor of Bacoor, Cavite, was a Liberal during his first term as mayor)
- Feliciano Belmonte Jr. (former Speaker of the Philippine House of Representatives)
- Kit Belmonte (former representative of the 6th district of Quezon City)
- Joy Belmonte (Mayor of Quezon City, was a Liberal during her term as Vice Mayor)
- Joel Villanueva (Senator of the Philippines, was a Liberal during his term as congressman and first term as senator)
- Danilo Lacuna (former Vice Mayor of Manila, was a Liberal during his term as Vice Mayor under Villegas)
- Ralph Recto (Senator of the Philippines)
- Vilma Santos-Recto (former Governor & Representative of the 6th district of Batangas)
- Chel Diokno (2019 senatorial candidate under the party before moving to KANP and run again for senator in 2022, lawyer)
- Teofisto Guingona Jr. (11th Vice President of the Philippines and former Senator; Liberal during his first term in the Senate)
- Teofisto Guingona III (Senator of the Philippines)
- Rene Saguisag (Senator of the Philippines)
- Ernesto Herrera (Senator of the Philippines)
- Salipada Pendatun (Senator of the Philippines)
- Santanina Rasul (Senator of the Philippines)
- Rogelio de la Rosa (Senator of the Philippines)
- Jesse Robredo (former Mayor of Naga City & former Interior and Local Government Secretary)
- Leni Robredo (14th Vice President of the Philippines, former Representative of Camarines Sur, Wife of former DILG Secretary Jesse Robredo & Party Chairman in Naga City)
- Camilo Osías (former Senate President of the Philippines)
- Herbert Bautista (former Mayor of Quezon City)
- Alfredo Lim (former Senator & Mayor of Manila, a Liberal during his presidential run and his fourth term as Mayor)
- Rodolfo Biazon (former Senator of the Philippines and Representative of Muntinlupa's lone district)
- Lito Atienza (former Mayor of Manila, a Liberal during his term as mayor, a survivor of Plaza Miranda bombing)
- Rafael Nantes (former Governor of Quezon Province & Former Party Treasurer of Liberal)
- Justiniano Montano (Senator of the Philippines)
- Tomas Cabili (Senator of the Philippines)
- Esteban R. Abada (Senator of the Philippines)
- Teodoro de Vera (Senator of the which replaced by the ruling of Senate Electoral Tribunal in favor of Claro M. Recto)
- Neptali Gonzales (Senator of the Philippines and former Representative of Rizal's 1st district and Vice Governor of Rizal)
- Estanislao Fernandez (Senator of the Philippines)
- Evelyn Fuentebella (Mayor of Sagñay, Camarines Sur)
- Cornelio Villareal (former Speaker of the House of Representatives, and Former Representative of the 2nd District of Capiz)
- Francisco Soc Rodrigo (Senator of the Philippines)
- Maria Kalaw Katigbak (Senator of the Philippines)
- Gaudencio Antonino (Senator of the Philippines)
- Jaime Fresnedi (Congressman of Muntinlupa)
- Sergio H. Loyola (Representative of the 3rd District of Manila)
- Romulo Peña Jr. (former Mayor and Representative of the 1st District of Makati)
- Mel Lopez (former Mayor of Manila and Plaza Miranda bombing survivor, was a Liberal during the final mayoralty term of Villegas as Vice Mayor and congressman at Manila's 1st District)
- Chavit Singson (Member of the Vigan City Council, during his younger years)
- Vicente Madrigal (Senator of the Philippines)
- Jose Yulo (1953 vice presidential candidate and 1957 presidential candidate, former Senator and Chief Justice of the Philippines)
- Antonio Quirino (1957 presidential candidate under his own wing, judge)
- Melecio Arranz (former Senate President pro tempore of the Philippines)
- Mariano Jesús Cuenco (Senator of the Philippines)
- Ramon Torres (Senator of the Philippines
- Olegario Clarin (Senator of the Philippines)
- Prospero Sanidad (Senator of the Philippines)
- Servillano dela Cruz (former representative and Governor of Pangasinan)
- Pedro Magsalin (former representative of Rizal)
- Geronima Pecson (Senator of the Philippines)
- Emiliano Tria Tirona (Senator of the Philippines)
- Pablo Ángeles David (Senator of the Philippines and former Governor of Pampanga)
- Carlos Tan (short-term Senator of the Philippines, which replaced by the ruling of Senate Electoral Tribunal in favor of Eulogio Rodriguez)
- Tecla San Andres Ziga (Senator of the Philippines and Representative of Albay's 1st district)
- Juan Liwag (Senator of the Philippines)
- Vicente A. Mayo (former Governor of Batangas)
- Eugenio Pérez (former Speaker of the House of Representatives of the Philippines)
- Valeriano E. Fugoso Sr. (former Mayor of Manila)
- Manuel dela Fuente (former Mayor of Manila)
- Felecisimo T. San Luis, former Governor of Laguna (1959–1992) and former Member of Santa Cruz Municipal Council (1947–1959).
- Juan G. Pambuan, former Governor of Laguna (1946–1947).
- Dominador E. Chipeco, Sr., former Governor of Laguna (1947–1959), left the Nacionalista to support San Luis' 1963 gubernatorial bid.
- Dr. Jose Cariño (former Mayor of Baguio)
- Luis P. Torres (former Mayor of Baguio)
- Gil R. Mallare (former Mayor of Baguio)
- Benito H. Lopez (former Mayor of Baguio)
- Norberto F. de Guzman (former Mayor of Baguio)
- Carmelo L. Porras (former Mayor of Davao City)
- Nicolas Escario (former Mayor of Cebu City)
- Jose B. Lingad (former representative and Governor of Pampanga)
- Eduardo "Eddie" B. Dimacuha (former )
- Beverley Rose A. Dimacuha-Mariño (current representative of Batangas at 5th district)
- Marvey Mariño (current Mayor of Batangas City)
