= Liberalism in the Philippines =

Liberalism in the Philippines first emerged during Spanish rule, along with broader liberal developments within Spain. The ideology became prominent among an educated group known as the ilustrado, including the author José Rizal, whose writing contained liberal themes. Liberal ideas were adopted by the nationalistic Philippine Revolution, and later co-opted by the American administration. Liberalism became popular under American rule, which saw the creation of the Liberal Party of the Philippines, one of the oldest parties in the Philippines. This elite ideology became contested following independence. The lack of progress on economic inequality led to a communist insurgency. Liberal democracy was further challenged by the establishment of Martial law under Ferdinand Marcos. A return to liberal democracy following the People Power Revolution was upturned by the rule of Rodrigo Duterte.

== History ==
=== Spanish tenure ===
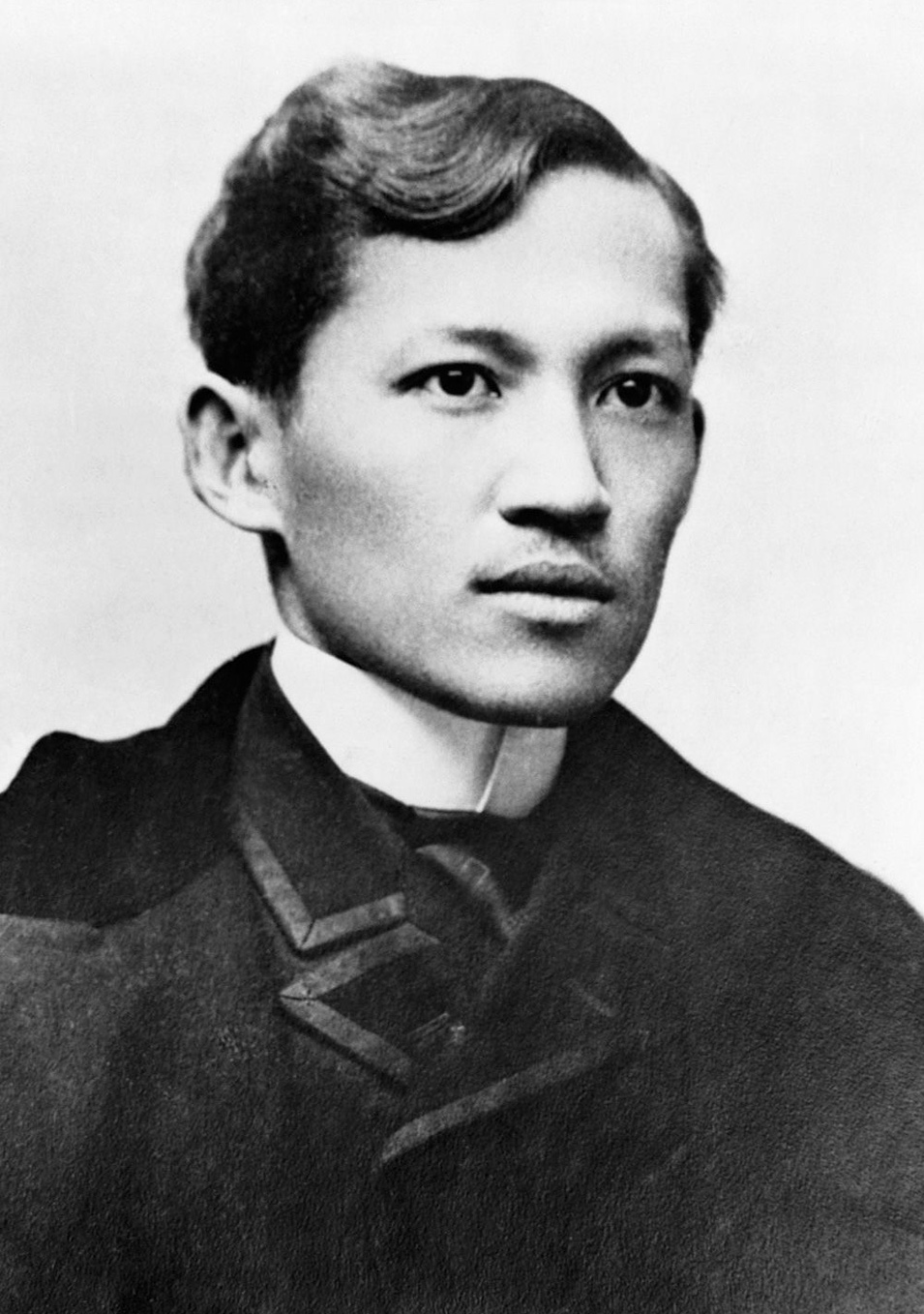
José Rizal was a prominent liberal thinker whose ideas were adopted by both the national movement and American authorities.

The 19th century saw the rise of liberalism in Spain, culminating in the Spanish Constitution of 1812. This constitution even included the representation of the Philippines within the Cortes of Cádiz. However, this representation was short-lived. The promises of liberalism in Spain were never fully implemented in the Philippines, where the powers of the state and church increased rather than decreased. The promise of equality under the law for all Spanish citizens in particular was never achieved, with non-peninsulares not being granted equality with native Spaniards in a racially segmented Spanish Empire.

Luis Rodríguez-Varela, a writer in the Philippines of European descent, sometimes known as "El Conde Filipino", began releasing books espousing a liberal view in 1799. These views were inspired by the French Revolution, and Varela later became a supporter of the 1812 constitution. He sought its full implementation of the constitution in the Philippines, along with representation for the Philippines in the Spanish Cortes. He also called for a school system independent of the church. Varela's views circulated among others of Spanish descent living in Manila, and the spread of these views eventually led to the creation of the Comite de Reformadores of 1869, the first Liberal political party in the country. Famous members include José Burgos, while the youth wing in the University of Santo Tomas included Felipe Buencamino and Paciano Rizal. The party was suppressed by the government following the 1872 Cavite mutiny. Some members went on to become members of the ilustrado, and the liberal ideas were revived through the Propaganda Movement.

Members of the Ilustrado, including those in the Propaganda Movement, sought reform of the governance of the Philippines and a curtailing of Catholic power. In particular, they called for an end to racial discrimination, and thus the full application of Spanish law in the Philippines, which would provide full rights to those in the Philippines as Spanish citizens with full representation in the Spanish Cortes.

The most prominent ilustrado was José Rizal. Rizal's novel Noli Me Tángere features a figure named Elias, who espoused secular and liberal beliefs that conflicted with reactionary beliefs regarding overbearing civil and religious authorities. Rizal remained more religious than many liberal thinkers in Spain proper, treating liberal freedoms as natural results of God's justice.

Liberal thought represented a powerful challenge to the conservative colonial governing structures. The ilustrado were Spanish-speaking and university-educated and desired assimilation into the mainstream of Spanish society. These political aspirations caused conflict with the influential friars in the Philippines, and the state generally sided with the religious authorities. Rizal wrote that "modern ideas" were "asphyxiated upon touching the shores of Manila". Liberal thought thus formed the core of a nascent nationalist movement, with the ideas of Rizal and other ilustrado being espoused by the nationalist Katipunan group.

=== American tenure ===
During American rule, liberalism was a key component of state-building, with many liberals promoted to important positions in the administration. Rizal's legacy was adopted by American authorities, who positioned him as espousing peaceful reforms that American rule had brought. While common among the elite in Filipino politics, liberal philosophy did not spread far within the economically unequal wider society, where Catholic conservatism competed with socialist movements. Beginning in the 1920s, the Filipino elite began to travel to the United States, becoming more familiar with American liberal ideas and the concept of a liberal democracy.

=== Early independence ===
Liberalism was the dominant ideology of the political elite upon independence. Nationalist historians have sometimes drew a distinction between the liberal ideas of the ilustrado and the ideals of the revolutionaries. 20th-century Filipino critics such as Renato Constantino and Jose Maria Sison viewed Rizal's writings as elite and bourgeoisie, believing his ideas of reform were unambitious compared to nationalist figures with whom Rizal disagreed.

=== Martial law ===
Broadly liberal rule was ended by the Presidency of Ferdinand Marcos. Ferdinand Marcos implemented martial law, justifying the move as necessary to combat the communist New People's Army rebellion as well as elite oligarchic families. The language and justification was couched in liberal ideals, although in practice they served as a means to maintain power. The Liberal Party developed to become a political opponent of the Marcos regime. A revolution driven in part by the urban Manila middle-class, named the People Power Revolution, ended the Marcos regime and reestablished a liberal democratic political system.

=== Modern era ===
The 2016 Philippine presidential election was run by populist Rodrigo Duterte, a dark horse candidate who campaigned on the failures of the existing political system to achieve change. This election followed the presidency of Benigno Aquino III, son of the first post-Marcos president Corazon Aquino, allowing for a strong link to be created against the Aquinos and their liberal democratic tradition. The ideology underlying Duterte's presidency became known as Dutertismo, and was opposed by Liberalists and Catholic priests; the regime was also opposed following allegations of mass murder. The populist rule of Duterte came into conflict with institutions and ideas associated with liberal democracy, such as liberal conceptions of a free press and human rights, although it maintained broadly liberal economic policies.

== Relationship to debate ==
In the early 20th century, debating groups developed in the Philippines among those who held liberal beliefs. This was seen as a role to prove to Americans that Filipinos were responsible citizens, and liberal ideas were deployed to argue for the Philippines' independence. Prominent liberal figures involved in debating included educator Camilo Osías and diplomat Carlos P. Romulo.

== See also ==
- Aquinoism

== Sources ==
- de Llobet, Ruth (2018). "Luis Rodríguez Varela: literatura panfletaria criollista en los albores del liberalismo en Filipinas, 1790-1824". Revista de crítica literaria latinoamericana (in Spanish). 44 (88): 131–154. ISSN 0252-8843.
