= Aquinoism =

Filipino political ideology named after Ninoy Aquino and Corazon Aquino

Aquinoism Aquinoismo
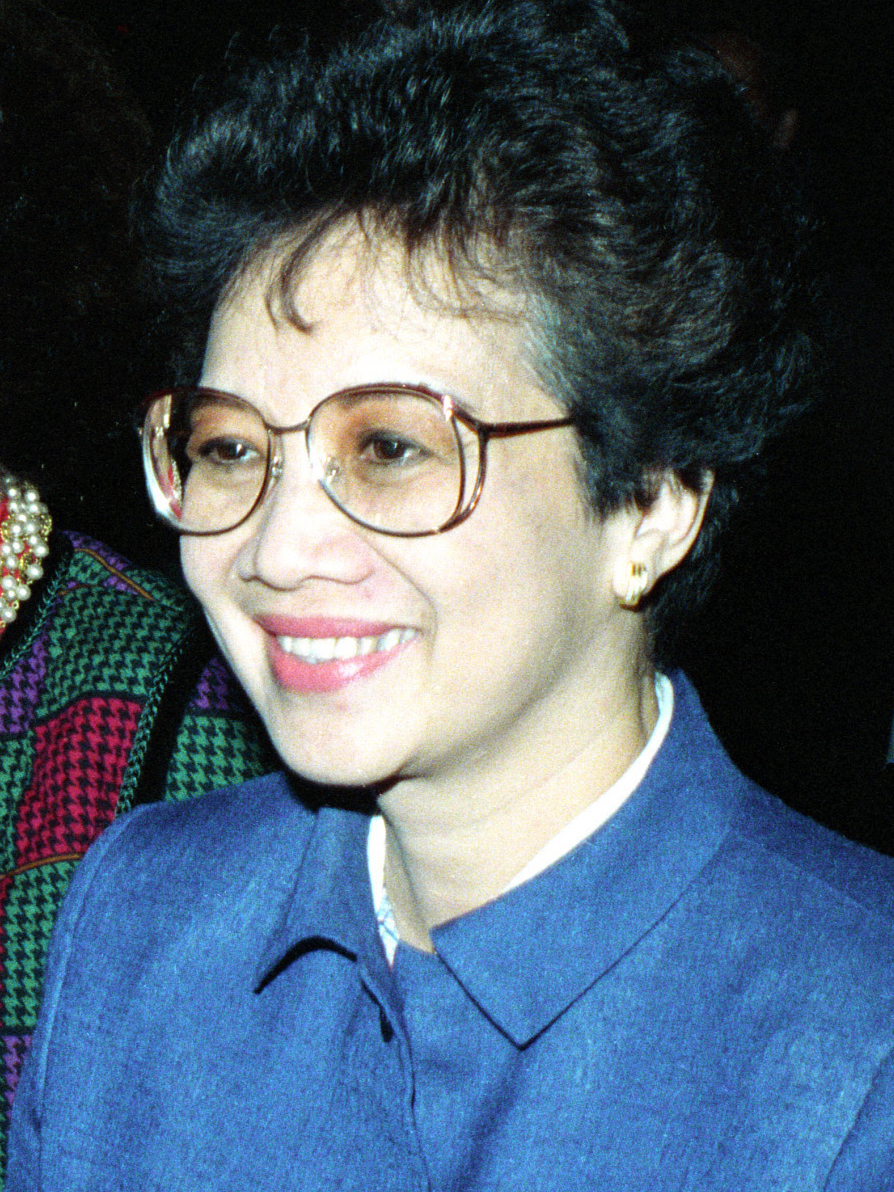
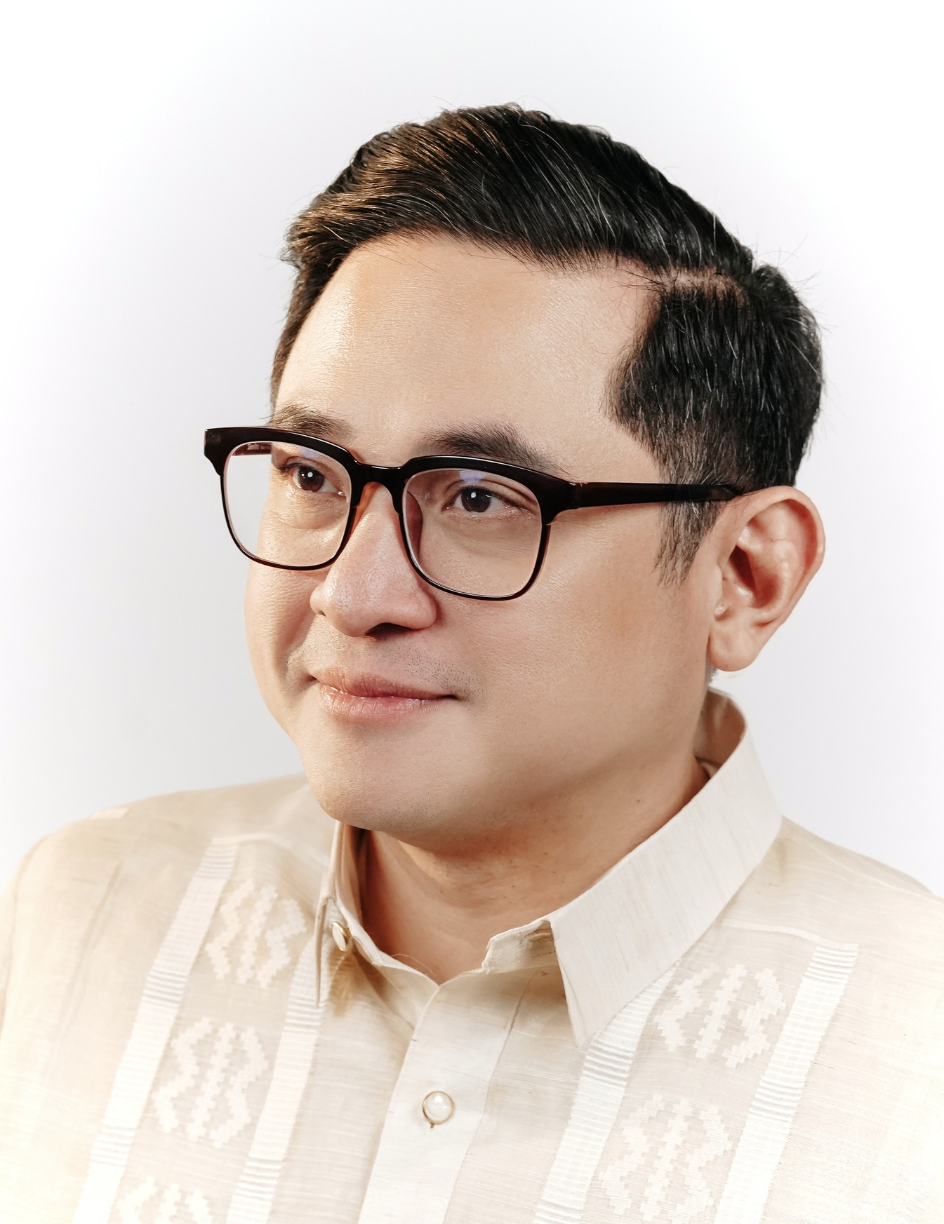
- From left to right: Corazon Aquino in 1986; Benigno Aquino III official portrait in 2010; Bam Aquino in 2025
- Leader: Bam Aquino
- Founders: Corazon Aquino
- Founded: August 21, 1983; 43 years ago
- Ideology: Liberalism (Filipino); Economic liberalism; Anti-authoritarianism; Anti-Marcosism; Anti-Dutertismo; Factions: Social conservatism; Social liberalism; Progressivism
- Political position: Centre to centre-left Factions: Centre-right or left-wing
- Colors: Yellow

Aquinoism (Filipino: Aquinoismo) refers to the political ideology and method of governance associated with Corazon Aquino and Noynoy Aquino, 11th and 15th president of the Philippines. This term is often used among political analysts, historians and critics to describe the Liberal style of governance in the Philippines.

== History ==
Aquinoism emerged following the assassination of Ninoy Aquino at Manila International Airport in 1983. The movement serves as an opposition to the government of dictator Ferdinand Marcos. The term surfaced in political discourse around February 1986, right after Corazon Aquino assumed the presidency, as leftist and progressive groups analyzed the new administration as a continuation of traditional elite politics.

Jose Maria Sison, the founder of the CPP-NPA-NDF, was one of the earliest critics who coined the term Aquinoism. In his published statement 'On the People's Democratic Revolution (Sison Reader Series Book 4)' on Dokumen.Pub, he said that "Aquinoism is Marcosism without Marcos", pointing out that while Aquino succeeded in re-establishing Democracy, she's still a puppet of elites.

== Allied parties and organizations ==
=== Political parties ===
- Liberal Party (Philippines)
- Lakas ng Bayan (LABAN)
- Partido Demokratiko Pilipino (PDP-Laban, formerly associated with Aquinoism, now part of the Dutertist camp)
- United Nationalist Democratic Organization (UNIDO)
- Partido Demokratiko Sosyalista ng Pilipinas (PDSP)
- Akbayan
- Katipunan ng Nagkakaisang Pilipino (KANP)
- Partido Reporma
- Magdalo Party-List
- Partido Panaghiusa (Local political party in Cebu)

=== Political organizations ===
- Mamamayang Liberal
- August Twenty-One Movement (ATOM)
- Bandilang Nagkaisa sa Diwa at Layunin (BANDILA)
- Cory Aquino for President Movement (CAPM)
- Kilusan sa Kapangyarihan at Karapatan ng Bayan (KAAKBAY)
- Kongreso ng Mamamayang Pilipino (KOMPIL)
- Light-A-Fire Movement
- Makati Business Club (Although they are not fully a political organization, they played a major role in overthrowing the Marcoses)

== Notable politicians, figures, and supporters ==
- Corazon Aquino, founder, 11th President of the Philippines
- Benigno Aquino III, 15th President of the Philippines
- Fidel V. Ramos, 12th President of the Philippines
- Bam Aquino, Senator of the Philippines (2013–2019; 2025–present)
- Franklin Drilon, former Senator of the Philippines
- Jovito Salonga, politician
- Jose W. Diokno, politician
- Mar Roxas, former Senator of the Philippines
- Leila de Lima, member of House of Representatives
- Risa Hontiveros, representative of Akbayan and Senator of the Philippines since 2016
- Jaime Sin, cardinal and archbishop of Archdiocese of Manila
- Ely Buendia, vocalist of Eraserheads
- Jim Paredes, activist, member and singer of Apo Hiking Society

== See also ==
- Assassination of Ninoy Aquino
- 1986 People Power Revolution
- Presidency of Corazon Aquino
- Presidency of Noynoy Aquino

=== Similar Ideologies ===
- Allendism
- Blairism
- Clintonism
- Kirchnerism
- Lulism
- Macronism
- Trudeauism
