= Clintonism =

Political ideology by Bill and Hillary Clinton

- From left to right, top to bottom: President Clinton and his cabinet, 1993; First Lady Hillary Clinton greeting NATO personnel in Bosnia, 1997; President Clinton signing welfare reform into law, 1996; President Clinton with Israeli Prime Minister Yitzhak Rabin and Palestinian President Yasser Arafat during the Oslo Accords ceremony, 1993
- Founders: Bill Clinton; Hillary Clinton
- National affiliation: Democratic Party
- Founded: 1993; 33 years ago
- Ideology: Domestic: Social liberalism; Political syncretism; Economic: Third Way; Neoliberalism; Fiscal conservatism; Foreign: Liberal internationalism; Atlanticism
- Political position: Center to center-left
- Country: United States

Clintonism is a political ideology and governing philosophy associated with the presidency of Bill Clinton (1993–2001) and the broader evolution of Democratic Party politics in the United States during the late 20th century. It is commonly characterized by a synthesis of traditionally liberal social policies with market-oriented economic strategies, emphasizing fiscal conservatism, moderate governance, and triangulation. Members of the Democratic Party who align with these policies and practices are often referred to as New Democrats.

The ideology is often considered a component of the broader Third Way, a centrist political framework that gained prominence in the 1990s across several Western democracies, with comparable movements including New Labour in the United Kingdom under Tony Blair, the Liberal Party of Canada under Jean Chrétien and Paul Martin, and the Social Democratic Party of Germany under Gerhard Schröder.

== Policies ==
=== Overview ===
At its core, Clintonism can be said in broad outline to favor certain policies:

- Free trade: an essential component of the Clinton administration's economic policy, which worked to pass NAFTA and create the World Trade Organization.
- Fiscal conservatism: restraining the growth of federal spending in order to create a balanced budget.
- Lower interest rates and deregulation.
- Compromise on social issues such as abortion and LGBT rights: Clinton signed the 1996 Defense of Marriage Act, although it was struck down by the Supreme Court and repealed by the 2022 Respect for Marriage Act.
- Reform or reduction of some government programs, exemplified by the ending of Aid to Families with Dependent Children as part of welfare reform.
- Internationalism, particularly the expansion of NATO.

== History ==
=== Origins (1985–1992) ===
Following landslide victories by the Republican Party in the 1980, 1984, and 1988 presidential elections, along with broad public support for "Reaganomics", several Democratic politicians came to believe that the party was in need of restructuring, away from the progressive New Deal coalition that had previously dominated it. Among them was Arkansas governor Bill Clinton, who in 1985 helped found the Democratic Leadership Council (DLC), an organization that sought to reposition the Democratic Party towards the center in order to gain broader national appeal. Similarly, in 1989, the Progressive Policy Institute (PPI) was founded as the DLC's affiliated think tank, tasked with developing and promoting policy ideas consistent with this emerging centrist vision.

Despite George H. W. Bush's popularity following the Gulf War, his approval ratings declined amid a weakening economy, creating an opportunity for Clinton to launch his 1992 presidential campaign. Drawing on populist messaging, he presented himself as a "New Democrat" who sought to cut middle-class taxes and to promote fiscal responsibility by "end[ing] welfare as we know it". Additionally, following the 1992 Los Angeles Riots, Clinton distanced himself from elements of Jesse Jackson's Rainbow/PUSH, a Democratic coalition that advocated expanded social programs, civil rights activism, and economic redistribution.

== Legacy ==
Notable political figures who have been associated with Clintonism include Leon Panetta, Rahm Emanuel, Larry Summers, Madeleine Albright, James Carville, Terry McAuliffe, Robert Rubin, Al From, Bruce Reed, and John Podesta. Barack Obama once referred to himself a "New Democrat", and his cabinet from 2009 to 2017 included several officials who had served in or were associated with the Clinton administration. Similarly, during his time in the Senate in the 1990s, Joe Biden supported a range of centrist Democratic policy initiatives, although his policy positions later shifted left during his presidency beginning in 2021.

The Democratic Leadership Council (DLC) argued in 2002 that Clintonism "stands for economic growth and opportunity; for fiscal responsibility; for work, not welfare; for preventing crime and punishing criminals; and for non-bureaucratic, empowering government" and further states that "these policies are key to the successes in the beginning of the 21st century." According to Vanity Fair, Clintonism is foundationally "based on the baby boomer credo that you truly can have it all". Many progressives, however, have criticized Clintonism, with Common Dreams describing the ideology as "coddling big money (except guns and tobacco), financial scandals, winning at any cost, flip-flopping and prevaricating".

== See also ==
- Aquinoism
- Blairism
- Hillaryland
- New Democrats
- Political positions of Hillary Clinton
