= New Covenant (politics) =

Political slogan by United States president Bill Clinton

A New Covenant was a political slogan used by United States president Bill Clinton to describe his political philosophy and agenda. The term was used sporadically during the 1992 United States presidential election campaign and Clinton's terms in office to describe a "new social compact" between the United States government and its citizens. In speech to the Democratic Leadership Council in May 1991, Clinton used the slogan "New Choice". He started publicly using the phrase "New Covenant" when he announced his candidacy for the Democratic Party's nomination on October 3, 1991. The phrase has been attributed to Clinton advisor William Galston.

== 1991 speech to the Democratic Leadership Council ==
In May 1991, the then-Governor Clinton outlined to the Democratic Leadership Council his New Democrats proposals through the slogan "New Choice". In his speech, Clinton stated: "Our New Choice plainly rejects the old categories and false alternatives they impose ... Liberal or conservative—the truth is, it's both, and it's different." The New Choice's wording of what came to be known as the "New Choice Resolutions", reflected past Democratic slogan like the New Deal and the New Frontier, and was hard fought (in regards to the name) between Clinton, Sam Nunn, and others.

The New Choice eventually evolved in the New Covenant, a centrist approach that rejected "the brain-dead policies in both parties", as Clinton had put it, and argued that both Democrat and Republican were old labels and without meaning like liberal and conservative. During the 1992 United States presidential election campaign, Clinton said: "The choice we offer is not conservative or liberal, in many ways it is not even Republican or Democratic ... It is different. It is new ... I call it a New Covenant."

== 1991 Georgetown University speeches ==
A New Covenant was the theme of a series of speeches given by Clinton in late 1991 at his alma mater, Georgetown University, to outline his Third Way political philosophy at the start of his campaign for the presidency, intended to be between the laissez-faire approach at the economy of the Republicans and the welfare state economics of the New Deal coalition that had dominated half of the 20th century. In these talks, the "New Covenant" referred to both domestic and foreign policy. The titles of the speeches were "The New Covenant: Responsibility and Rebuilding the American Community" (October 23, 1991), "A New Covenant for Economic Change" (November 20, 1991), and "A New Covenant for American Security" (December 12, 1991). Galstone introduced the "New Covenant" wording that Clinton used to define his interest in public–private partnerships, as well as his call for responsibility within the context of citizens and elected representatives being colleagues in actions rather than adversaries. The wording also recalled American Puritanism and had overtones with the social contract tradition.

As part of his New Covenant, Clinton used the "Make America Great Again" slogan that been used by Ronald Reagan at the 1980 Republican National Convention. At the climax to his announcement address in 1991, Clinton stated: "Together we can make America great again and build a community of hope that will inspire the world." Like Reagan in 1980 and Donald Trump in 2016, Clinton successfully won disaffected voters, including "left behind" or "forgotten" white American working-class voters, whose support helped him to win the election. In 1992, Clinton's strategy of courting blue-collar workers included a pledge to forge "a New Covenant of change that will honor middle-class values, restore the public trust, create a sense of community, and make America work again". This pledge was first made in "The New Covenant: Responsibility and Rebuilding the American Community". In contrast to Trump, Clinton's campaign rejected the notion that isolationism was a solution to the American economy but made it clear that he intended to fight for American workers, including using the threat of foreign economic competition as a political leverage. In "A New Covenant for Economic Change", Clinton stated that protectionism was "a fancy word for giving up; we want to compete and win. That's why our New Covenant must include a new trade policy that says to Europe, Japan, and our other trading partners: we favour an open trading system, but if you won't play by those rules, we'll play by yours."

In his October 23 speech, Clinton promised to balance the budget, rebuild the American economy, and reduce unemployment. As part of his plans to shrink the size of the government and in his own words "make work pay", he promised to "end welfare as we know it". In his November 20 speech, presenting himself as a man of the people and citing his record as governor of Arkansas, Clinton presented a platform that targeted what he saw as the often forgotten middle class. Clinton argued that the government had grown too large and was not responsive to the needs of Americans; he proposed a solution that would not be "liberal or conservative" but rather "new, and both, and different". He also tried to present a broad vision and a specific plan that he called "A New Covenant for Economic Change". In the speech, he spoke at length about his ideas promoting investment, and also proposed a middle-class tax cut that would be paid for with higher taxes on the rich. Clinton stated: "In a Clinton Administration, we'll cut income tax rates on the middle class: an average family's tax bill will go down 10%, a savings of $350 a year. And the deficit won't go up—instead those earning over $200,000 a year will pay more." Clinton presented such middle-class themes not only as wise social policy or smart political choice but raised them to the spiritual level. He said: "These are not just economic proposals, they are the way to save the very soul of our nation." In his December 12 speech, which was focused on foreign policy, Clinton argued that the United States should not "try to remake the world in its image" but at the same time said that the democratic reforms in the Soviet Union were inspired by American ideals about democracy and the American Dream. In calling for a "New Covenant for American Security", he based it on the crucial assumption that the American definition of security "must include common threats to all people". During the 1992 campaign, Clinton also called for a "pro-democracy foreign policy" and faulted his challenger, the incumbent United States president George H. W. Bush, for his "eagerness to befriend potentates and dictators".

== Acceptance speech to the 1992 Democratic National Convention ==
Clinton repeatedly used the phrase "New Covenant" in his acceptance speech to the 1992 Democratic National Convention to describe economic, health care, minority rights, tax, and defense issues. He also said it was "a new approach to government. A government that offers more empowerment and less entitlement; more choices for young people in public schools and more choices for older people in long-term care. A government that is leaner, not meaner; that expands opportunity, not bureaucracy; that understands that jobs must come from growth in a vibrant and vital system of free enterprise." The term was also used in the party's 1992 platform, "A New Covenant with the American People", which called for a "New Covenant" demanding "greater individual responsibility" in return for a government that provides opportunity, described business as "a noble endeavor", and required welfare recipients who can work "to go to work within two years". Clinton also promised to fill a void created by "12 years of Republican irresponsibility and neglect" that he said had left "our people torn by divisions".

== 1995 State of the Union Address ==
After the Republican Party gained control of Congress in the 1994 midterm elections, Clinton returned to the New Covenant theme in his 1995 State of the Union Address. This time, he reframed the philosophy as a centrist approach that included smaller government, tax reductions, and less bureaucracy. Conservative William Kristol called the address the "most conservative State of the Union by a Democratic president in history". In the speech, Clinton narrowed the "New Covenant" to domestic policy and focused on "opportunity and responsibility" to describe his proposals on his legislative agenda, such as welfare reform. Clinton stated: "I call it the New Covenant. But it's grounded in a very, very old idea – that all Americans have not just a right, but a solid responsibility to rise as far as their God-given talents and determination can take them; and to give something back to their communities and their country in return. Opportunity and responsibility: They go hand in hand. We can't have one without the other. And our national community can't hold together without both." He added: "Our New Covenant is a new set of understandings for how we can equip our people to meet the challenges of a new economy, how we can change the way our government works to fit a different time, and, above all, how we can repair the damaged bonds in our society and come together behind our common purpose. We must have dramatic change in our economy, our government and ourselves."

== Commentary ==
Clinton's call for a "New Covenant" was seen as saying that the 12 previous years under United States presidents Ronald Reagan and George H. W. Bush represented a breaking of the traditional relationship between the American people and their government, presumably because of the close relationship between leaders in those administrations and big business interests, as opposed to traditional Democratic constituencies, such as labor unions, women's groups, and minority group members. Clinton accused the Republican administrations of Reagan and Bush of losing touch with the nation's values, having rewarding those who "cut corners and cut deals" while "those who play by the rules and keep the faith have gotten the shaft".

Although Clinton apparently hoped that this term would come to be used to describe the policies adopted by his administration, it was never widely adopted, and thus is not as widely associated with Clinton and his policies as is the Square Deal with Theodore Roosevelt, the New Freedom with Woodrow Wilson, the New Deal with Franklin D. Roosevelt, the Fair Deal with Harry S. Truman, the New Frontier with John F. Kennedy, or the Great Society with Lyndon B. Johnson. The term had distinctly Christian connotations deriving from the New Covenant of the Bible.

== Bibliography ==
=== Primary sources ===
- Clinton, Bill (May 6, 1991). Keynote Address of Gov. Bill Clinton to the DLC's Cleveland Convention (Speech). Cleveland, Ohio.
- Clinton, Bill (October 3, 1991). Announcement Speech (Speech). Little Rock, Arkansas. Archived from the original on April 21, 2003.
- Clinton, Bill (October 23, 1991). The New Covenant: Responsibility and Rebuilding the American Community (Speech). Georgetown University. Archived from the original on January 8, 2025.
- Clinton, Bill (November 20, 1991). A New Covenant for Economic Change (PDF) (Speech). Georgetown University. Archived (PDF) from the original on June 26, 2024.
- Clinton, Bill (December 12, 1991). A New Covenant for Economic Security (PDF) (Speech). Georgetown University. Archived (PDF) from the original on June 26, 2024.
- Clinton, Bill (July 16, 1992). A Place Called Hope (Speech). Democratic National Convention. New York, New York. Archived from the original on November 21, 2010.
- Clinton, Bill (January 24, 1995). 1995 State of the Union Address (Speech). Washington, D.C. Archived from the original on September 19, 2018.
- Clinton, Bill; Smith, Stephen (1996). Preface to the Presidency: Selected Speeches of Bill Clinton 1974-1992. University of Arkansas Press. ISBN 978-1-55728-441-9. JSTOR j.ctt1ffjmgp.
- Wooley, John T.; Peters, Gerhard (July 13, 1992). "A New Covenant with the American People". The American Presidency Project. Archived from the original on May 2, 2019.

=== Secondary sources ===
- Barber, Benjamin R. (2001). The Truth of Power: Intellectual Affairs in the Clinton White House. W. W. Norton & Company. ISBN 978-0-393-07040-8.
- "Bill Clinton on Tax Reform". OnTheIssues.org. February 22, 2022.
- Bodie, William C. (September 1993). "The threat to America from the former USSR". Orbis. 37 (4): 509–525. doi:10.1016/0030-4387(93)90078-Q. ISSN 0030-4387.
- Boys, James D. (February 2021). "Grand Strategy, Grand Rhetoric: The Forgotten Covenant of Campaign 1992". Politics. 41 (1): 80–94. doi:10.1177/0263395720935782. ISSN 0263-3957.
- Brandt, Karl Gerard (2007). "The Ideological Origins of the New Democrat Movement". Louisiana History: The Journal of the Louisiana Historical Association. 48 (3): 273–294. ISSN 0024-6816. JSTOR 4234284.
- Choo, Villemaire (May 2019). "The New Covenant: Welfare Reform and American Exceptionalism" (PDF). Undergraduate Honors Theses. Paper 1302.
- Cox, Michael (March 14–18, 2000). "Wilsonianism Resurgent? The Clinton Administration and American Democracy Promotion in the late 20th Century". Columbia International Affairs Online.
- Davidson, Lee; Riley Roche, Lisa (July 17, 1992). "Clinton Calls for a 'New Covenant'". Deseret News. ISSN 0745-4724.
- Dean, Kevin W. (1992). "Bill Clinton's 'New Covenant': Re-Visioning an Old Vision" (PDF). National Forensic Journal. X (Fall): 101–110. Archived from the original (PDF) on September 4, 2006.
- "The Democratic Platform; Excerpts From the Platform: A 'New Covenant' With Americans". The New York Times. July 15, 1992. p. 10, section A. ISSN 0362-4331.
- Donaldson, Robert H. (2014). Modern America: A Documentary History of the Nation Since 1945: A Documentary History of the Nation Since 1945. Routledge. ISBN 978-1-317-46469-3.
- Devroy, Ann (January 25, 1995). "Clinton Calls for a Centrist 'Social Compact". The Washington Post. ISSN 0190-8286. Archived from the original on September 19, 2018.
- DeWitt, Karen (July 17, 1992). "In Their Own Words; Clinton's Policy Trademark: 'New Covenant'". The New York Times. p. 15, section A. ISSN 0362-4331.
- Didion, Joan (September 24, 1992). "Eye on the Prize". The New York Review of Books. Vol. 39, no. 15. ISSN 0028-7504. Archived from the original on October 18, 2016.
- Edsall, Thomas B. (July 12, 1992). "Show of Party Unity Masks Scars of Ideological Battle". The Washington Post. ISSN 0190-8286.
- From, Al; McKeon, Alice (2013). The New Democrats and the Return to Power. Macmillan + ORM. ISBN 978-1-137-40144-1.
- Kaslow, Amy (July 14, 1992). "Democrats Fashion Broad Platform". Christian Science Monitor. ISSN 0882-7729.
- Kwak, James (December 11, 2019). "'Take Back Our Party' Chapter 1: Their Democratic Party". The American Prospect. ISSN 1049-7285.
- Lehrer, Jim; Gergen, David; Safire, William (August 15, 1996). "Waving words". NewsHour. PBS. Archived from the original on November 9, 2012. This is a transcript of a discussion between Jim Lehrer, David Gergen, and William Safire.
- Reeves, Richard (January 10, 1993). "There's Nothing New Under the Sun Except Newness Itself". News & Record. ISSN 1072-0065.
- "Reinventing Foreign Policy". The New York Times. January 24, 1993. p. 16, section 4. ISSN 0362-4331.
- Riley, Russell; From, Al; Morrisroe, Darby; Steiner, Jessica (April 27, 2006). "Al From Oral History (2006)". Miller Center. This is a transcript of a discussion between Russell Riley, Al From, Darby Morrisroe, and Jessica Steiner.
- Rosenbaum, David E. (August 16, 1992). "The 1992 Campaign; Parties' Core Differences in Platforms". The New York Times. p. 26, section 1. ISSN 0362-4331.
- Søndergaard, Rasmus Sinding (July 2015). "Bill Clinton's 'Democratic Enlargement' and the Securitisation of Democracy Promotion". Diplomacy & Statecraft. 26 (3): 534–551. doi:10.1080/09592296.2015.1067529. ISSN 0959-2296.
- Stahl, Jason (2016). "Think Tanks, New Democrats, and Committed Conservatives". In Stahl, Jason (ed.). Right Moves: The Conservative Think Tank in American Political Culture since 1945. University of North Carolina Press. pp. 134–173. ISBN 978-1-4696-2786-1.
- Van Der Slik, Jack R.; Schwark, Stephen J. (October 1998). "Clinton and the New Covenant: Theology Shaping a New Politics or Old Politics in Religious Garb?". Journal of Church and State. 40 (4): 873–890. doi:10.1093/jcs/40.4.873. ISSN 0021-969X. JSTOR 23920052.
- Weaver, Timothy P. R. (2015). "Blair and Clinton: A Third Way?". Blazing the Neoliberal Trail: Urban Political Development in the United States and the United Kingdom. University of Pennsylvania Press. pp. 109–158. doi:10.9783/9780812292220-004. ISBN 978-0-8122-9222-0.
- Woodward, Bob (1994). The Agenda: Inside the Clinton White House. Simon and Schuster. ISBN 978-0-6718-6486-6.
