= Al From =

American political strategist (born 1943)

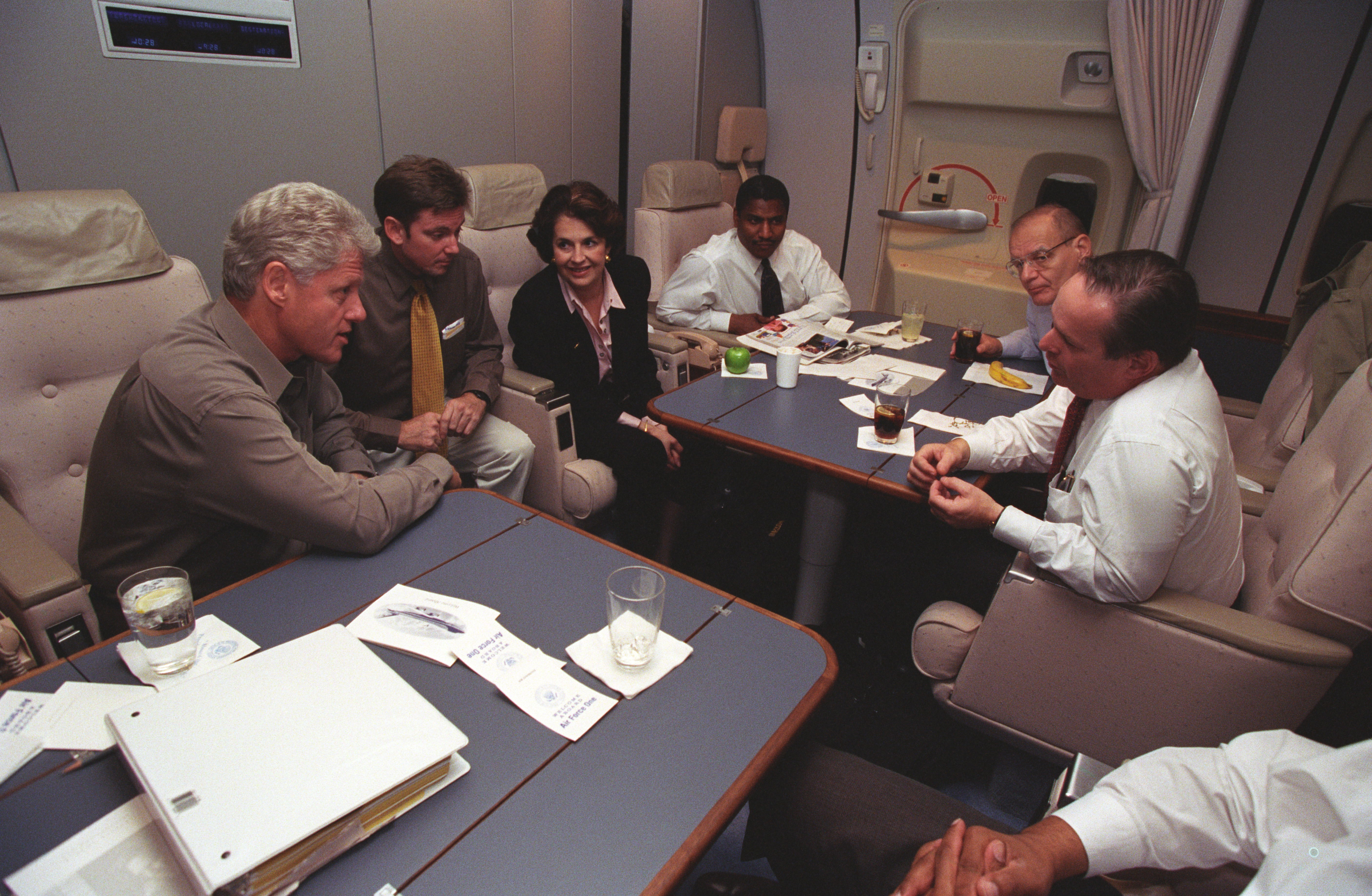
- From (far right) with Bill Clinton on Air Force One, 1999

Personal details
- Born: Alvin From; May 31, 1943 (age 83) South Bend, Indiana, U.S.
- Party: Democratic
- Spouse: Ginger From
- Education: Northwestern University (BS, MS)

Alvin "Al" From (born May 31, 1943) is an American political strategist best known for being the founder and former CEO of the Democratic Leadership Council (DLC). His ideas and political strategies during the late 20th century played a central role in the resurgence of the modern Democratic Party. From is the author of The New Democrats and the Return to Power, which was published by Palgrave MacMillan in December 2013. Since January 2018, he is an adjunct professor at Johns Hopkins University.

After graduating in journalism, From began his career working in the Democratic administrations of Lyndon B. Johnson and Jimmy Carter. It was during these years that From came to reject the legacy of the New Deal and grew disillusioned with the New Deal coalition. As a result, he worked for Democratic representatives or senators who were increasingly critical of New Deal liberalism, and supported the 1984 presidential campaign of Gary Hart, an Atari Democrat and forerunner to From's New Democrats.

After founding the DLC in 1985 and the Progressive Policy Institute in 1989, From and the New Democrats remained at the margins of the Democratic Party, and did not gain control of the party until 1992 when it greatly influenced the Clinton administration. Many of their ideas, initially considered fringe and rejected or resisted by the liberal wing of the Democratic Party, eventually became mainstream and found their application during the Clinton presidency. His takeover of the party, which From himself described as a bloodless revolution, was seen by critics and other commentators as a coup and intellectual leverage.

The Third Way, as it came to be known the DLC brand under From, significantly influenced like-minded center-left and social-democratic parties across the globe. Despite Democratic losses in the early 2000s, it continues to be influential in the 21st century, and New Democrats continue to be a dominant faction of the modern Democratic Party, of which From is considered to be its political father.

== Early life and education ==
From was born into a Jewish family in South Bend, Indiana, in 1943. He grew up in the Heartland during his formative years. From earned a bachelor's and master's degree in journalism from Northwestern University, where he roomed with Kentuckian and future Louisville Courier-Journal editor David Hawpe, and was also editor of the Daily Northwestern. He was later named a charter member of the Hall of Achievement of the Medill School of Journalism.

While serving as a reporter and editor for the Daily Northwestern, From conducted an investigation on discriminatory admissions. He uncovered an unofficial quota system that limited the number of minority students admitted to the program. From quoted admissions director C. William Reiley as making discriminatory statements. The day after the story was published, the student senate argued that Reiley's actions were inappropriate, and Reiley was later reassigned as the dean of administrative services as a result. The removal of Reiley and exposure of the quotas ended the discriminatory practice.

== Career ==
=== Early career ===
Soon after graduating, From began his career when a journalistic mentor told him he could "write about poverty or you can do something about it". As a result, he started working in 1966 for Sargent Shriver as an inspector of the War on Poverty under Lyndon B. Johnson, and was assigned to the Southeast region including Alabama, Mississippi, and Georgia. It was during the Great Society programs that From came to reject the liberalism of the New Deal coalition whilst retaining what he saw as its spirit of innovation, and change the Democratic Party. From later put it thusly: "The harsh reality of the New Deal era — the nine elections between Roosevelt's in 1932 and Johnson's in 1964 — was that it was the anomaly, not the norm." This view was also echoed into the 21st century by the likes of Thomas Piketty. From saw himself as an engineer of a new Democratic coalition that could live outside these circumstances, which were considered to be exceptional.

Of his early lessons in welfare, From wrote: "Contrary to the conventional wisdom today, the War on Poverty was not a big welfare program. Just the opposite: it was an empowerment program. We hated welfare. In the Deep South, welfare was the tool of a controlling and detested white power structure." From 1981 to 1985, when he founded the DLC, he was executive director of the House Democratic Caucus, which was chaired by Representative Gillis William Long from Louisiana. Previously, he had been a deputy advisor on inflation to Jimmy Carter from 1979 to 1980. In a memo for Long, From wrote: "We cannot afford to become a liberal party, our message must attract moderates and conservatives, as well. ... The private sector, not government, is the primary engine for economic growth. ... Government's proper role is to foster private sector growth and to equip every American with the opportunities and skills that he or she needs to succeed in the private economy."

From directed the U.S. Senate Subcommittee on Intergovernmental Relations, which was chaired by Senator Edmund Muskie from Maine, from 1971 to 1979. From joined the staff of Muskie during his vice-presidential and presidential campaigns in 1968 and 1972. From later argued that Muskie was a progenitor of Bill Clinton and the New Democrats movement. As staff director, From worked on the Congressional Budget and Impoundment Control Act of 1974, contributed to the stimulus package during the 1973–1975 recession, and was called a "legislative genius" by Washingtonian magazine. During the Carter administration, From maturated the view that "the Democrats had run out of ideas". Although he did not like and did not support Ronald Reagan's policies, the political shift of the Reagan era suited From's career since he went on to expand his network of politicians who thought that the Democratic Party was in trouble and needed to be changed. In the 1984 Democratic Party presidential primaries, From supported Gary Hart, considered a forerunner to the New Democrats movement, and criticized the 1984 Democratic National Convention as "the last hurrah of the Mondale wing of the party".

=== Democratic Leadership Council and Progressive Policy Institute ===
From founded the DLC in March 1985, and led it from its inception until he stepped down as CEO in April 2009. The DLC has been described as "a motley crew of technocratic, business-friendly upstart Democrats, who would eventually become household names". He founded the DLC at a time when many thought that the party was going extinct due to its liberal policies in a context that was no longer favorable to them. As Matthew Murray writes in Roll Call, "Democrats appeared to be on the brink of a permanent excursion into the political wild following Walter Mondale's 49-state drubbing by incumbent President Ronald Reagan in 1984." From said: "By the old math, Dukakis should have been elected in '88. He carried 85% of the Democratic vote, more than Jimmy Carter when he won in '76. But there were – and still are – fewer national Democrats than a decade ago, due largely to the fact that many middle-class voters see the party as their enemy." He also stated: "In a sense, politics is arithmetic. With 88–90 percent white voters and virtually no Hispanic voters, there was no Obama coalition. What Reagan and Bush did was win a big chunk of the core of the old New Deal coalition, working and middle class whites. In a two party race, Democrats had to win at least 43–45 percent of white voters to win." There are critics who disagree with the notion of Mondale and Dukakis being ultraliberals or that their loss could simply be explained by their liberalism, pointing for example that Mondale advocated for deficit reduction and that his proposed tax increases were intended to reduce the national debt, and that, as did Sidney Blumenthal in his book on the 1988 election, "Dukakis's politics of lowered expectations, his career of slashing budgets and tax cuts, made him seem a new kind of Democrat, a man of his time". From maintains that "Dukakis was clearly to the left of the DLC", to which one may respond that so were liberal Republicans like Jacob Javits and Chuck Percy, or that Dukakis was in fact dubbed an Atari Democrat and was a New Democrat.

In January 1989, From founded the Progressive Policy Institute, and appointed Will Marshall, considered one of the founders of the New Democrats movement, president of the Progressive Policy Institute. That same year, Elaine Kamarck and William Galston wrote for the Progressive Policy Institute a paper titled "The Politics of Evasion". In 1992, From recalled: "What we tried to do was to say that this party has to understand that if we're going to win, we have to unite our core constituency – those who are aspiring to get into the middle class, and those who are struggling to stay there." From and his think tank are credited for their prominent role in reversing the Democratic Party's fortunes after losing five out of six presidential elections from 1968 to 1988. Starting in 1992, Democrats won four of six elections, and also won the popular vote five times. With Obama's re-election in 2012, in From's words, it marked "the fifth time in six elections that the Republicans lost the popular vote for president", and he suggested the Republican Party to move towards the center in order to win again. In 2014, he stated: "Times change ... Republicans need a power center that will counter the nutcases on the extreme right ... They've got to understand party unity is overrated ... I can't tell you how many times we were called divisive." This view was also earlier echoed by American Enterprise Institute Senior Fellow Philip A. Wallach in his review of From's memoirs, stating that "the political moment for a Republican reorientation is bound to happen, especially if the Democrats retain the White House in 2016. Potential reformers who want a Republican Party capable of governing must ready themselves for their chance, and in doing so they have much to learn from Al From."

From and the DLC, and by extension the New Democrats, were not exempt from controversies or criticism, particularly from liberals who felt that their policies were a betrayal of traditional liberalism, which is denied by the DLC and From, who instead saw it as "an effort to revive the Democratic Party's progressive tradition". Liberal critics argue that they promoted Republican policies, that the New Democrats did not restore the core values of the New Deal or reverse the Reagan Revolution, and that they sold out the party to the corporate world, citing the fact that the DLC was financed by the Koch network, with two of its members being part of the DLC board of trustees, among other corporate donors, in contrast to their claims of being against special interests. One such early liberal critic was Jesse Jackson, who in 1991 referred to the DLC as "Democrats for the Leisure Class". Citing From's support among Southern Democrats, who were called "Dixie centrists", Jackson also identified the DLC leadership as "Dixiecrats". Howard Metzenbaum, a liberal Senator of Ohio, founded the Coalition for Democratic Values in 1990 as an ideological counterweight to the DLC.

From and the DLC supported some of George W. Bush's economic policies, and also came to support the United States invasion of Iraq and the Iraq War. As reported by The New Republic, despite deliberately running moderate or conservative candidates to win back the House and Senate, they failed to do so in 1998, 2000, and 2002. In July 2003, From warned about a takeover of the party by "the far left". In December 2003, future Democratic National Committee chair and former Vermont governor Howard Dean sharply criticized From and the DLC as the Republican wing of the Democratic Party. In the words of David Von Drehle writing in 2003, "From pushed the Democratic Party to the right for nearly 20 years", and New Democrats ideas, such as welfare reform, were often unpopular with liberals. Liberal critics also lamented that the DLC under From was an intellectual buyout of the Democratic Party. This was acknowledged by Rob Shapiro, the DLC vice-president at the time and a Clinton advisor, who said: "What we've done in the Democratic Party is an intellectual leveraged buyout." From himself stated: "I think we will be for the Clinton administration what the Heritage Foundation was for the Reagan administration. An idea factory to help Bill come up with new approaches."

=== Rise of New Democrats ===
According to Kenneth S. Baer's history of the DLC in Reinventing Democrats: The Politics of Liberalism from Reagan to Clinton (2000), From used the organization fundraising prowess to attract Bill Clinton in becoming the DLC's chairman. Citing internal memos written by From, Bruce Reed, and other members of the DLC, Baer argued that the DLC under From offered Clinton not only a national platform for his presidential aspirations but also "entree into the Washington and New York fundraising communities". From rejected the idea that the DLC was shaping its views to cultivate its donors, and said: "Anybody who's familiar with the DLC knows that we do what we think is right." At the same time, he acknowledged the evolution of the DLC and its changing with the times, particularly on social issues. He said: "What we're about is the modernization of progressive politics so it can be successful." The DLC was not able to take over the party in 1988 but did so in 1992. Baer writes: "Although many DLC members found their way into some of the most important roles at the [1988] convention, it did not mean that the New Democrats had the upper hand." After Jesse Jackson was denied a speaking slot at a high-profile 1991 Cleveland session, which became known as the "Cleveland debacle", the DLC abandoned its earlier big tent approach. According to Baer, the DLC had raised enough money to continue operating as "an elite organization funded by elite-corporate and private-donors".

In 2001, From recalled the landslide defeat of 1984, and argued that "Robert Kennedy is my hero. I saw the liberal cause, which I believe in, almost go the way of the Whigs. And I said, 'How do you take these principles ... and do it so that people will vote for us again?'" In 2003, From attracted criticism and a controversy ensued when he argued as the DLC president that Howard Dean was not fit to be United States president. From and others, such as Bruce Reed, dismissed Dean as an elitist liberal from the "McGovern-Mondale wing" of the party, "the wing that lost 49 states in two elections, and transformed Democrats from a strong national party into a much weaker regional one", and concluded: "We are increasingly confident that President Bush can be beaten next year, but Dean is not the man to do it. Most Democrats aren't elitists who think they know better than everyone else." Dean spokesman Joe Trippi responded: "It is a shame that the DLC is trying to divide the party along these lines. Governor Dean's record as a centrist on health care and balancing the budget speaks for itself."

Supporters of From and the DLC respond to liberal criticism that they were simply doing what was necessary to win elections and return the Democratic Party to power. Simon Rosenberg, the former field director for the DLC who directed the New Democrat Network, a spin-off political action committee, stated: "We're trying to raise money to help them lessen their reliance on traditional interest groups in the Democratic Party. In that way, they are ideologically freed, frankly, from taking positions that make it difficult for Democrats to win." In response to being described as a conservative Democrat, From named his think think the Progressive Policy Institute precisely because he thought that would make it harder for media outlets to call it the "conservative Progressive Policy Institute". Some critics observe that progressive was a term that during the Cold War era referred to the left of liberalism but that, in Paul Starr's words, with its DLC's framing "came to refer vaguely to any viewpoint left of center". Some critics also recognize that there were some genuinely progressive motivations behind the DLC. Matt Stoller argues: "The DLC group is sometimes portrayed as a pro-Wall Street set of lobbyists. And From did recruit hedge fund legends like Michael Steinhardt to fund his movement. But to argue these people were corrupt or motivated by a pay to play form of politics is wrong. From is clearly a reformer and an ideologue, and his colleagues believed they were serving the public interest." In response to critics who saw the rise of the DLC and the New Democrats as a coup, or what Lloyd Grove described in 1992 as a "not-so-silent coup", and that it was a very successful one, this is acknowledged by From who argue that this was no different from what the conservatives did in the Republican Party during the 1960s and 1970s. In a memo about the DLC's strategy, From wrote: "Make no mistake about it, what we hope to accomplish with the DLC is a bloodless revolution in our party."

=== Bill Clinton administration ===
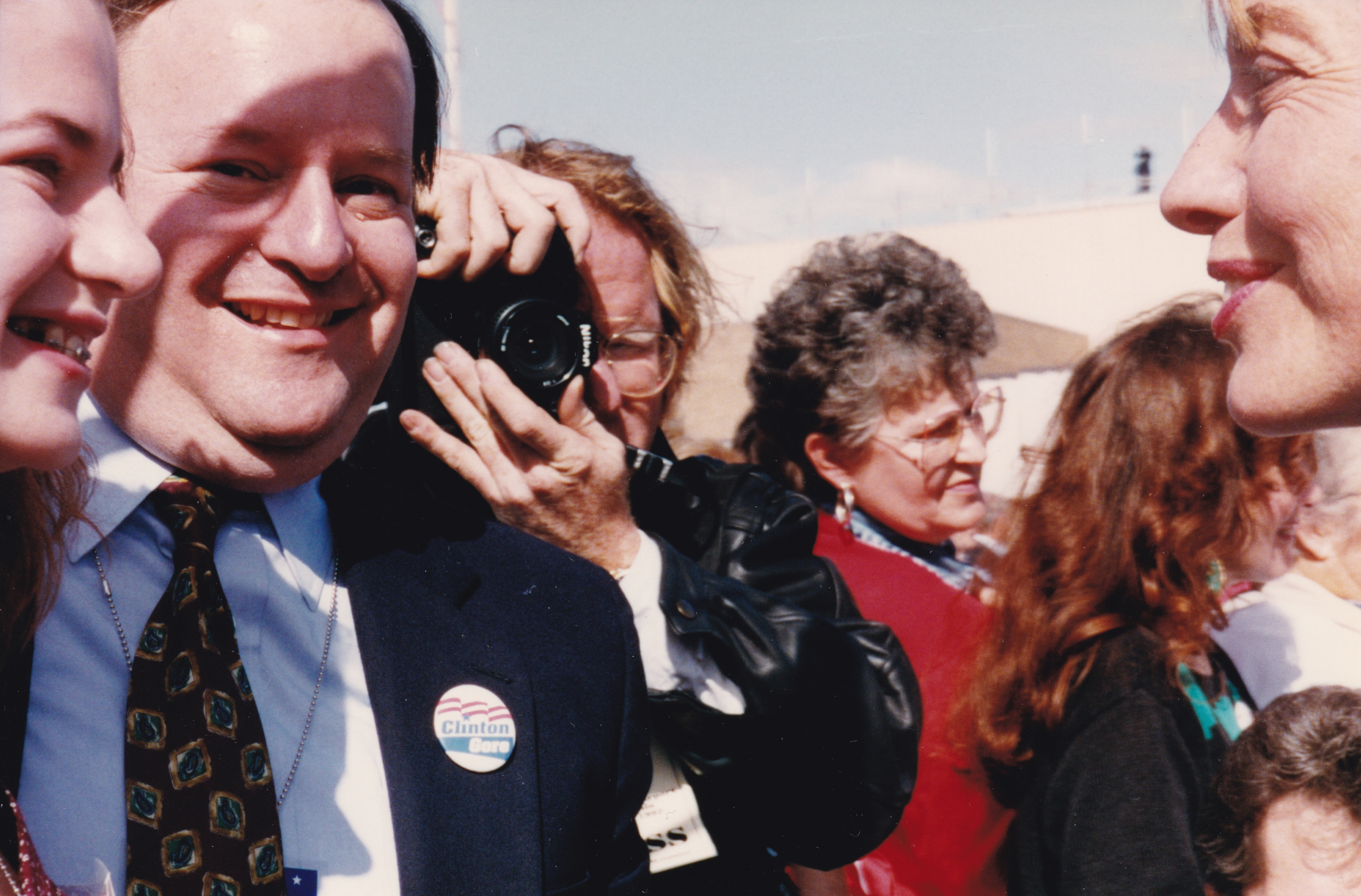
Al From greeting Hillary Clinton the day after Bill Clinton's 1992 victory

From played a prominent role during the successfully 1992 United States presidential election campaign of Bill Clinton, being described as "Bill's good buddy", as the Clinton campaign successfully recovered the Reagan Democrats. and served as the domestic policy advisor to the Clinton transition. About From's influence, Adam Nagourney of USA Today wrote: "The ideas at the crux of the Clinton candidacy were largely drafted by the DLC." In recruiting Clinton, From and Clinton struck a deal. In July 1992, From stated that "Clinton is going to win", and argued: "The American people have decided overwhelmingly that the country is going in the wrong direction, and George Bush won't reverse it. So I believe that we're going to have a new president." Many of the ideas that comprise the core of the agenda of the New Democrats, and that were initially considered to be fringe or heretical, came from work done under From's leadership at the DLC. National service, an expanded Earned Income Tax Credit, community policing, welfare reform, expanded free trade, charter schools, and re-inventing government were all championed by scholars and analysts at the DLC before becoming public policy. As a result, From is seen as a long-time advisor to Clinton and the godfather of the New Democrats movement.

From was a strong supporter of free trade and NAFTA, and worked with Robert Rubin, Bill Daley, and Rahm Emanuel to run a campaign in order to pass it. This was the first and only time that he was a registered lobbyist. During Clinton's first term, From argued that passing NAFTA would have strengthened his presidency and that it would have been seen as a loss for David Bonior and the labor movement. In a memo to Clinton, From wrote: "Of all the opportunities you have this fall, NAFTA presents the greatest. Passing NAFTA can make your presidency. NAFTA presents both an economic and political opportunity ... I can't tell you how much better it would make your life and how much it would strengthen your presidency for you to beat (David) Bonior and organized labor on NAFTA. That would reestablish presidential leadership in the Democratic Party, something that hasn't happened since 1966." He added: "Politically, a victory on NAFTA would assert your leadership over your own party by making it clear that you, not the Democratic leadership in Congress or the interest groups, set the Democratic Party's agenda on matters of real national importance."

Although From and the DLC undoubtedly influenced and informed the policies of the Clinton administration, such as through his many memos, Clinton himself did not always follow their advices; for example, the DLC was critical of the Clinton health care plan of 1993 and supported a health care reform that was similar to Obamacare. Joan Walsh argue that it was Clinton who made the DLC and not vice versa. According to Democratic pollster and Clinton confidant Stanley Greenberg, Clinton's presidential approval ratings did not start to rise "until he rejected the advice of conservatives of the party" and adopted a more populist and distinctly non-DLC rhetoric on a variety of issues, from tax policy to protecting Social Security. According to critics, the DLC had the most influence in the first two years of Clinton's first term, which resulted in the "Republican Revolution" and what has been called "the worst Democratic electoral setback of the century" at the 1994 midterm elections. After 1994, the DLC founded the New Democrat Network, and increased their membership in the U.S. House of Representatives after the 1996 and 1998 elections. By 2000, they included around sixty House Democrats. During a dinner with his Secretary of Labor Robert Reich, who wanted to end corporate welfare, Clinton reportedly told, as recalled by Reich in Locked in the Cabinet, "I have to keep myself from saying it everyday. I shouldn't be out in front on these issues. I can't be criticizing [corporations]." Other critics attribute the 1994 losses to tax increases and Clinton's health care reform, and argued that Clinton further engaged in triangulation policies afterwards. About Clinton's first two years, From himself argued that "he would be defined by the congressional Democrats he came to Washington to change", with the exception of NAFTA. According to From, it was Clinton's insufficient postering to the DLC that caused his losses in 1994.

=== Third Way ===
In 1998, From began a dialogue with the then British prime minister Tony Blair and other world leaders as the DLC brand, known as the Third Way, became a model for resurgent center-left governments worldwide. In April 1999, he hosted a Third Way forum in Washington, D.C., with Bill and Hillary Clinton and Blair, alongside other center-left prime ministers in Europe like Massimo D'Alema of Italy, Gerhard Schröder of Germany, and Wim Kok of the Netherlands. The Third Way expanded outside Europe, with figures like Ricardo Lagos of Chile and Thabo Mbeki of South Africa, as they worked to create a "progressive manifesto defining their common progressive approach to governance". In November 1999, From moderated the first-ever live presidential town hall meeting on the Internet.

In a 2000 speech at Hyde Park, Clinton said: "It would be hard to think of a single American citizen who, as a private citizen, has had a more positive impact on the progress of American life in the last 25 years than Al From." When Clinton said that about From, some commentators said that he was not exaggerating as From had helped him win the presidency. For example, in his review of From's memoirs, Matt Stoller observed: "Now, of course it's an exaggeration to say that Al From created the culture of the governing class in the modern Democratic Party. But not by much. Don't take it from me, take it from Bill Clinton. In 2000, at Franklin and Eleanor Roosevelt's Hyde Park residence, Clinton said of From, 'It would be hard to think of a single American citizen who, as a private citizen, has had a more positive impact on the progress of American life in the last 25 years than Al From.' Clinton overdoes the rhetoric sometimes, but not in this case. From helped put Clinton in the White House."

=== 2000 and 2004 presidential losses ===
On the eve of the 2000 Democratic National Convention, From stated that a day was soon coming when "we'll finally be able to proclaim that all Democrats are, indeed, New Democrats." In practice, during the last months of the 2000 United States presidential election, From's and the DLC's influence diminished as Al Gore took a more populist turn, which many analysis credited for his surge in the polls in August and early September. From recalled his failed attempts to bring the Democratic ticket back to its New Democrat roots. He said: "Once Joe got on the ticket, I worked mostly through him. I talked to Shrum, Greenberg, Eskew, and Tad Devine. I did a memo to Gore. I actually gave him a game plan to try to contain the populism in a way that would do the least damage."

From blamed Gore's loss on George W. Bush's successful attempt at portraying Gore as "a big government liberal". In contrast, other Democrats argued that Gore's loss was because he was not liberal enough, that his populist turn had in fact helped him overturn his 17-point deficit in the polls, and later also argued that John Kerry's loss in the 2004 United States presidential election was because he followed the advice given by From and others of the DLC to "seize the vital center" as they warned in their criticism of Howard Dean. Liberal critics also argue that New Democrats were followed by conservative reaction, such as Bush and Donald Trump, which in their view cast doubt about their success, that From and the DLC developed a too simplistic explanation by taking credit for all Democratic wins and attributing all party losses to its left wing or populism, wondering what is the point of governing if it means betraying the traditional Democratic values and adopting Republican policies, and that Gore had in fact won in 2000 after running a more liberal and populist campaign, also pointing to Gore and Ralph Nader's combined total votes as majoritarian in favor of progressive politics. From did not blame the loss on the Green Party of the United States.

From and Democratic pollster Mark Penn instead argued that Gore had lost because he was not centrist enough. Although acknowledging the importance of the old Democratic Party base, From and Will Marshall criticized Gore for alienating what they described as upscale "wired workers" in the new economy and swing voters in comfortable suburbs who they argued were turned off by Gore's populist message. In a special issue of Blueprint titled "Why Gore Lost", From further criticized Gore, writing: "By emphasizing class warfare, he seemed to be talking to Industrial Age America, not Information Age America." In the aftermath of the 2004 loss for Democrats, From stated: "We have to come to grips with the real reason we lost this election: Whether we like it or not, too many Americans doubt whether we will be tough enough in the war on terror."

=== Other ventures and later career ===
Appointed to the U.S. Naval Academy Board of Visitors in 1999, From served as chairman until his term expired in December 2002. From also serves on the advisory board of the Public Diplomacy Collaborative at Harvard University, the Board of Advisors of the Medill School of Journalism at Northwestern University (his alma mater), the Board of Directors of the U.S. Chamber of Commerce National Chamber Foundation's, the Board of Trustees of the Annapolis Symphony Orchestra, the National Advisory Board of the Roosevelt Institution, and the executive board of the University of Maryland's Center for American Politics and Citizenship. In April 2009, From founded the From Company, LLC, a venture that offers strategic advice to private clients and of which he serves as president.

In early 2005, there was a debate between From and Chuck Todd on The Atlantic. In response to Todd's articles titled "Clintonism, R.I.P." and "The Clinton Trap", From wrote "Clintonism, Alive and Well". In the 2006 United States Senate election in Connecticut, From supported Joe Lieberman over the Democratic nominee. Ahead of the 2008 Democratic Party presidential primaries, as Democratic candidates snubbed the DLC, From said: "They have tunnel vision. Presidents are elected in the middle and they are elected by being bigger than their party. Neither parties' activists alone can elect somebody president. Democrats have a long history of nominating people, including people who have lost badly. The challenge for Democrats is to nominate somebody who can win the election." As the Democratic candidates continued to move to the left, From disagreed, saying that the DLC's ideas were more relevant than ever and were particularly reflected in Hillary Clinton's campaign. In August 2008, From told Obama and other Democratic leaders that "the antiwar people cannot define the Democratic Party". After Obama was elected, the DLC fell from its peak in the Clinton years and struggled for relevance during Obama's first term. In February 2011, the DLC closed down as a result of financial issues. From reiterated that the DLC's ideas would continue to be relevant. He said: "The issues the D.L.C. has championed continue to be vital to our country. The Democratic Leadership Council has had an historic impact on American politics over the past 25 years. We're convinced that it will continue to have that impact in the future."

In January 2018, From became an adjunct faculty member at Johns Hopkins University in the Zanvyl Krieger School of Arts and Sciences, Advanced Academic Programs. Along with Alice McKeon, with whom he wrote The New Democrats and the Return to Power, From began co-teaching Political Ideas, Strategy, and Policy Implementation in the MA in Government program. From has appeared on various media outlets including Face the Nation and the Newshour with Jim Lehrer, and was also a PBS commentator during presidential elections. His writings have appeared in numerous national publications, for example The Washington Post, where he wrote "What Democrats can learn from the centrists who got Bill Clinton to the White House". Further publications where he wrote include among others The Atlantic, The Bulwark, the Chicago Tribune, the Los Angeles Times, The New York Times, Politico, U.S. News & World Report, and The Wall Street Journal.

=== The New Democrats and the Return to Power ===
In 2013, From authored The New Democrats and the Return to Power as his memoirs. Bill Clinton wrote the foreword. In the book, From explores "the founding philosophy of the New Democrats, which not only achieved stunning validation during Clinton's two terms, but also became the model for resurgent center-left parties in Europe and throughout the democratic world", and outlines "for the first time the principles at the heart of the [New Democrats] movement, including economic centrism, national security, and entitlement reform, and why they are vital to the success of the Democratic Party in the years ahead." A congressional staffer in the 1980s, From saw the changing demographics as an opportunity to not only help the Democratic Party return to the presidency but also a way to exploit the defeats of 1980s to transform the party's message to be more appealing to the professional class. In the book, he writes: "The party's first imperative was to revive the American dream of expanding opportunity by fostering broad-based economic growth led by a robust private sector generating high-skill, high-wage jobs." He also recalled how Congressmen, moderate governors, and party leaders met to discuss the future direction of the Democratic Party, concluding that putting together "a coalition of liberals and minorities" was not a winning combination, and thus had to rework their appeal in the Western and Southern states so as to develop a message that could also attract moderate and conservative voters. The documentary film Crashing the Party (2016) was based on Frum's book.

The book received praise from Clinton, Tony Blair, the then Maryland governor Martin O'Malley, former White House Chief of Staff and Chicago mayor Rahm Emanuel, former Mississippi governor Haley Barbour, Thomas J. Donohue of the U.S. Chamber of Commerce, Lanny Davis in the Washington Times, Kirkus Reviews, Philip A. Wallach at the Brookings Institution, and independent researcher Brian Gongol. In his review of the book, Matt Stoller observed that the civil rights movement era, in which From and the New Democrats grew up, had "birthed modern neoliberalism, not in the sense that it was an inevitable succession to it but in that those who run our neoliberal institutions got their inspiration from it. Clinton's welfare reform in the 1990s was not a rejection of the civil rights movement, or at least Clinton and From don't see it that way. It was a continuation of it." Stoller praised From, although he disagreed with many of his policies, for successfully building an organization that significantly changed the country, arguing that "the story he tells is believable. So if you want to know why America is governed the way it is, this story matters." Stoller, who criticized the book for not being complete and for lacking a clear definition of the old liberalism From was opposing, nonetheless concluded: "But if you expect changes in philosophy and behavior due to these losses, you're going to have to do what Al From did. Which is, organize. And don't just organize to put Democrats in power, organize around ideas the way that Al From did. From's ideas were incredibly consequential, and they are today the basis for how the West is run." For The Nation, historian Rick Perlstein offered a negative review of From's book, criticizing its historical inaccuracies, and writing that "the triumphs he trumpets have made America a worse place—objectively, empirically and on their own terms. But From is among the small minority of people they haven't hurt." Perlstein concluded his review by saying that "the formula has worked well enough for From: he's been wrong in the same way over and over again, and for him, things have turned out just fine."

== Personal life ==
From lives in Annapolis, Maryland, with his wife Ginger, who is from Birmingham, Alabama. Unlike him, she does not have a Southern accent. As of 2018, he has two daughters and three granddaughters.

== Legacy ==
Although described as "one of America's premier strategists and policy entrepreneurs", and well known among political insiders, From is relatively unknown to the public as he was never a cabinet member, he never held an elected office, and his most high-profile role was as Bill Clinton's domestic policy transition manager for a few months in 1992. Despite his views about reducing the power of government, From always worked as a public servant until he founded the DLC. He was an idealist, and said that he "made sure that only our true believers set the agenda, not financial contributors or even the politicians who joined for political cover".

The DLC launched the careers of many Democratic leaders, including among others Bill and Hillary Clinton, Dick Gephardt, Joe Biden, Al Gore, and Barack Obama, who called himself a New Democrat in 2009. Although he faded since the Clinton years and his influence declined in the 2000s as Republicans returned to power, From and the New Democrats continue to be influential into the 21st century, for example during the Obama administration, so much so that he is considered a "founder of the modern Democratic Party", as well as "the structural engineer behind today's Democratic Party", and that Matt Stoller titled his review of From's memoirs "It's Al From's Democratic Party: We Just Live Here". Donald A. Baer, a White House communications director under Clinton, called From "one of the great heroes of American politics during the last quarter-century", and said: "His dedication to principles and finding a new way to modernize progressive government — along with his rambunctious spirit — contributed in a big way to saving the Democratic Party." In contrast, liberal critics argue that it ultimately destroyed it.

Many Obama cabinet picks and House and Senate Democrats were New Democrats. From 2007 to 2011, the New Democrats were the leading swing bloc in the House, and were the main authors of the legislation on bailouts and financial regulation of derivatives. In February 2010, Matt Bai of The New York Times Magazine cited the DLC under From's leadership, alongside the conservative Heritage Foundation, as one of the "most influential think tanks in history, the primary shapers of political thought at the end of the broadcast age". Although the DLC closed down in 2011, having achieved its goals, it remains influential through the Third Way organization. From's belief in presidential primacy over the legislature was echoed during the Obama years when Republicans had regained control of Congress.

The transformation of the Democratic Party from being a representative of labor unions to its association with the managerial class was a creation of From and the New Democrats under Clinton. After the Democratic loss in the 2024 United States presidential election, news outlets like Politico and The New York Times reported on a four-page memo, dated November 11, addressed to "Discouraged Democrats", and written by former Obama administration official, fundraiser and venture capitalist Seth London. In the memo, London attributed the loss to identity politics, and suggested to build a faction within the party to support "charismatic, moderate officeholders" and advance market-friendly moderation, with observers seeing it as an attempt to revive From's DLC. The memo cited the DLC in calling for the creation of "a party within the party" to combat what he says was Democrats' excessive deference to progressive activists.

Majority Democrats, a hybrid political action committee (PAC) and super PAC was launched in July 2025 by elected representatives from the Democratic Party. The group is led by Rohan Patel, a former executive at Tesla and Obama administration official. Its inaugural chairman is Jake Auchincloss. The group's structure resembles the DLC and many of the officials involved in Majority Democrats also come from the center-left. It incorporates ideas of Seth London, an advisor to influential Democratic donors, especially his recommendation to establish a "leadership committee" which he laid out in a post-2024 election memo. London is a part of the Majority Democrats initiative.

== Bibliography ==
=== Primary sources ===
- From, Al; Beatty, Jack; O'Beirne, Kate (October 22 – November 5, 1996). "Who Should Lead America into the Next Century?". The Atlantic. ISSN 2151-9463.
- From, Al (February 4, 2005). "Clintonism, Alive and Well". The Atlantic. ISSN 2151-9463.
- From, Al; Riley, Russell; Morrisroe, Darby; Steiner, Jessica (April 27, 2006). "Al From Oral History (2006)". Miller Center.
- From, Al; Riley, Russell (January 11, 2007). "Al From Oral History (2007)". Miller Center.
- From, Al; Reed, Bruce (July 3, 2007). "Activists Are Out of Step". Los Angeles Times. ISSN 2165-1736.
- Ford, Harold Jr.; From, Al (March 21, 2008). "America needs a 21st Century GI Bill". Chicago Tribune. ISSN 2165-171X. Archived from the original on November 5, 2008.
- From, Al (May 22, 2008). "The Democrats: Into the Homestretch". The New York Times. ISSN 0362-4331.
- From, Al (November 3, 2008). "After Election Day, Barack Obama and the Democrats Will Have to Reach Out to Wal-Mart Voters in the Forgotten Middle Class". U.S. News & World Report. ISSN 0041-5537.
- From et al. (September 13, 2009). "Topic A: Is There Hope for Health Reform?". The Washington Post. ISSN 2641-9599.
- From, Al (March 2, 2009). "Staying course on post-partisanship". Politico. ISSN 2381-1595.
- From, Al (October 16, 2009). "Al From: Democrats Don't Need the Public Option". The Wall Street Journal. ISSN 0099-9660.
- From, Al; McKeon, Alice (2013). The New Democrats and the Return to Power. Macmillan + ORM. ISBN 978-1-1372-7864-7.
- From, Al (December 3, 2013). "Recruiting Bill Clinton". The Atlantic. ISSN 2151-9463. Archived from the original on July 15, 2016.
- From, Al (December 3, 2013). "What the GOP Can Learn From the Dems' Comeback". Politico. ISSN 2381-1595.
- From, Al (January 8, 2014). "The War on Poverty Was Not About Welfare. That's Why It Worked". Politico. ISSN 2381-1595.
- From, Al (January 4, 2018). "What Democrats can learn from the centrists who got Bill Clinton to the White House". The Washington Post. ISSN 2641-9599.
- From, Al (December 9, 2024). "What It Took to Fix the Democratic Brand Last Time Around". The Bulwark.

=== Secondary sources ===
- "Al From". Democratic Leadership Council. October 5, 2004. Archived from the original on November 29, 2005.
- "Al From". Northwestern University Medill School. 2013. Archived from the original on September 1, 2016.
- "Al From". Johns Hopkins Advanced Academic Programs. Johns Hopkins University. 2018. Archived from the original on July 7, 2024.
- Andrews, Tom (August 18, 2008). "The DLC's Al From Is Wrong... Again". Common Dreams.
- Arens, Elizabeth (August 1, 2001). "The Democrats' Divide". Hoover Institution.
- Babington, Charles (January 25, 2001). "Democrats Split on What Went Wrong". The Washington Post. ISSN 2641-9599.
- Baer, Kenneth S. (2000). Reinventing Democrats: The Politics of Liberalism from Reagan to Clinton. University Press of Kansas. ISBN 978-0-7006-1009-9.
- Bai, Matt (February 19, 2010). "The Brain Mistrust". The New York Times Magazine. ISSN 0362-4331.
- Berman, Ari (March 4, 2005). "From & Friends". The Nation. ISSN 0027-8378. Archived from the original on March 6, 2005 – via Common Dreams.
- Brandt, Karl Gerard (2007). "The Ideological Origins of the New Democrat Movement". Louisiana History: The Journal of the Louisiana Historical Association. 48 (3): 273–294. ISSN 0024-6816. JSTOR 4234284.
- Branegan, Jay (May 18, 1998). "The Third Way Wonkfest". Time. ISSN 0040-781X. Archived from the original on April 3, 2009.
- Brownstein, Ronald (December 5, 2013). "Democrats' Advantage With Women and Minorities Isn't Enough". National Journal. ISSN 0360-4217.
- Burman, Jeff (1997). "Bill's Labor Secretary Tells All". The Motion Picture Editors Guild Newsletter. Vol. 18, no. 4. ISSN 1541-2679. Archived from the original on May 29, 2012.
- Cebul, Brent (July 16, 2019). "Supply-Side Liberalism: Fiscal Crisis, Post-Industrial Policy, and the Rise of the New Democrats" (PDF). Modern American History. 2 (2): 139–164. doi:10.1017/mah.2019.9.
- Clift, Eleanor (August 21, 2024). "Here's how Democrats have changed since the Bill Clinton era". MSNBC.
- Couric, Katie; Myers, Lisa (June 5, 1991). "Democratic Leadership Council Attempts to Redefine Democratic Party" (PDF). NBC Today Show. Archived from the original (PDF) on August 18, 2011.
- Curry, Tom (December 17, 2004). "Which way ahead for Democrats?". NBC.
- Davis, Lanny (June 29, 2009). "Al From, a founder of today's Democratic Party". The Washington Times. ISSN 0732-8494.
- Dayen, David (December 2, 2024). "Insider Memo Envisions a New DLC". The American Prospect. ISSN 1049-7285.
- "Democratic hopefuls snub moderate group". Associated Press. July 25, 2007 – via NBC News.
- "Democratic Leadership Council Founder and CEO Al From on Why the Democrats Lost the Election". The Washington Post. January 26, 2001. ISSN 2641-9599. Archived from the original on April 25, 2018.
- Dreyfuss, Robert (December 19, 2001). "How the DLC Does It". The American Prospect. ISSN 1049-7285. Archived from the original on November 7, 2015.
- Elder, Shirley (October 1978). "N/A". Washingtonian. ISSN 0043-0897.
- Feldmann, Linda (February 8, 2011). "Group for centrist Democrats runs out of money. Does it matter?". Christian Science Monitor. ISSN 0882-7729.
- Ferenstein, Greg (July 27, 2016). "Clinton Won Because College-Educated Voters Prefer Her To Sanders. Here's Why". The Ferenstein Wire. Archived from the original on January 18, 2017.
- French, Lauren (August 10, 2015). "New Democrats plan 'assertive' new presence in House". Politico. ISSN 2381-1595. Archived from the original on June 19, 2016.
- Gold, Matea (December 23, 2003). "Dean, Centrist Branch Spar". Los Angeles Times. ISSN 2165-1736.
- Gongol, Brian (May 18, 2017). "'The New Democrats and the Return to Power' by Al From". Gongol.com. Archived from the original on July 13, 2024.
- Grove, Lloyd (July 23, 1992). "Al From, the Life of the Party". The Washington Post. p. D01. ISSN 0190-8286. Archived from the original on February 15, 2006.
- Harris, John F. (March 5, 2009). "DLC on brink of a major shake-up". Politico. ISSN 2381-1595.
- Hughes, Elliot (May 4, 2014). "Political strategist details Democrats' resurgence in 1990s". Lawrence Journal-World.
- Hulse, Carl (August 12, 2008). "Indiana Senator Offers Obama Risks and Rewards". The New York Times. ISSN 0362-4331.
- James, Frank (February 7, 2011). "Centrist Democratic Leadership Council To Close: Politico". NPR.
- Kilgore, Ed (February 9, 2011). "Requiem for the DLC". The New Republic. ISSN 2169-2416.
- Kramer, Michael (May 4, 1992). "The Political Interest: The Brains Behind Clinton". Time. ISSN 0040-781X. Archived from the original on April 17, 2008.
- Kuhn, David Paul (June 16, 2009). "Al From Won". RealClearPolitics.
- Kwak, James (December 11, 2019). "'Take Back Our Party' Chapter 1: Their Democratic Party". The American Prospect. ISSN 1049-7285.
- Lacey, Marc (November 9, 1999). "History Is Made by an Old-Fashioned chief.gov". The New York Times. ISSN 0362-4331.
- "Less of the complaining ..." Democratic Leadership Council. July 23, 2010. Archived from the original on June 11, 2012.
- Lester, Will (January 7, 2014). "Al From recounts rebuilding of Democratic Party". Associated Press.
- Liasson, Mara (July 25, 2006). "Centrist Democratic Group Looks to Reassert Influence". NPR.
- "MA in Government Faculty Member al from Featured in Washington Post". Advanced Academic Programs. Johns Hopkins University. January 8, 2018. Archived from the original on January 19, 2018.
- Mishak, Michael J. (November 2, 2007). "'New Democrat' says center still holds". Las Vegas Sun.
- Murray, Matthew (March 12, 2009). "A Moderate Superstar Retires From the DLC". Roll Call. Archived from the original on June 9, 2011.
- Nader, Ralph (2003). "The Corporatist Democratic Leadership Council". Public Interest.
- Nagourney, Adam (December 4, 1992). "Democratic Council to Play Key Role in Administration". USA Today. p. A4. ISSN 0161-7389.
- "The New Democrats and the Return to Power". Kirkus Reviews. October 19, 2013.
- "New Democrats and the Return to Power". Powell's Books. 2013.
- Nichols, John (2000). "Behind the DLC Takeover". The Progressive. ISSN 0033-0736.
- Perlstein, Rick (February 11, 2014). "From & Friends". The Nation. ISSN 0027-8378. Archived from the original on December 25, 2024.
- Reeve, Elspeth (February 8, 2011). "Why Is the Democratic Leadership Council Shutting Down?". The Atlantic – via Yahoo! News.
- Rosenberg, Paul (April 30, 2016). "Clintonism screwed the Democrats: How Bill, Hillary and the Democratic Leadership Council gutted progressivism". Salon. ISSN 1727-0324. Archived from the original on May 1, 2016.
- Ross, Benjamin (Spring 2003). "Democratic Misalliances". Dissent. ISSN 1946-0910.
- Schmitt, Mark (February 10, 2011). "When the Democratic Leadership Council Mattered". The American Prospect. ISSN 1049-7285.
- Shear, Michael D. (February 7, 2011). "Democratic Leadership Council Suspends Its Operations". The New York Times. ISSN 0362-4331.
- Smith, Ben (February 7, 2011). "The end of the DLC era". Politico. ISSN 2381-1595.
- Smith, Yves (November 9, 2014). "Matt Stoller: Why the Democratic Party Acts The Way It Does". Naked Capitalism.
- Starr, Paul (May 13, 2014). "From the Frame-Maker". Democracy Journal. No. 33. ISSN 1931-8693.
- Stoller, Matt (November 6, 2014). "It's Al From's Democratic Party: We Just Live Here". Medium. Archived from the original on November 29, 2015.
- Sudbay, Joe (August 25, 2010). "Koch Industries gave funding to the DLC and served on its Executive Council". AMERICAblog News. Archived from the original on September 5, 2015.
- Todd, Cuck (January 2005). "Clintonism, R.I.P." The Nation. ISSN 2151-9463. Archived from the original on January 4, 2005.
- Todd, Cuck (January 25, 2005). "The Clinton Trap". The Atlantic. ISSN 2151-9463. Archived from the original on January 26, 2005.
- "The Third Way Goes Global: From New Democrat to New Labour to New Middle". The Democrat. May 1, 1999. Archived from the original on July 10, 2010.
- Thornton, Paul (February 28, 2008). "Twenty things you never knew that you never knew about NU". North by Northwestern. Archived from the original on March 7, 2017.
- Von Drehle, David (May 15, 2003). "The 'D' in DLC Doesn't Stand for Dean". The Washington Post. ISSN 2641-9599. Archived from the original on February 9, 2019.
- Wallach, Philip A. (December 5, 2013). "Book Review of Al From's Reflections on the Creation and Rise of the DLC". Brookings Institution. Archived from the original on August 3, 2024.
- Walsh, Joan (July 30, 2003). "The Democratic Weaselship Council". Salon. ISSN 1727-0324. Archived from the original on November 4, 2012.
- Young, Jeremy C. (May 14, 2019). "Why Democrats are thinking about electability all wrong". The Washington Post. ISSN 2641-9599.

=== Speeches ===
- Clinton, Bill (May 21, 2000). "Speech by President at Democratic Leadership Council Retreat". William J. Clinton Center Online Library Archives. Archived from the original on July 19, 2011.
- Clinton, Bill (December 3, 2002). "Remarks by Former President William J. Clinton to the Democratic Leadership Council (printable version)". The University of North Carolina at Chapel Hill.
- From, Al (December 3, 2002). "Introductory Remarks by DLC Founder and CEO Al From and Mayor Martin O'Malley". Democratic Chair Leadership. Archived from the original on October 11, 2007.

=== Videos ===
- "The DLC: A Tribute to DLC Founder Al From". Democratic Chair Leadership. June 16, 2009. Archived from the original on December 3, 2010.
- "A Tribute to Democratic Leadership Council Founder Al From". C-SPAN Video Library. June 16, 2009. Archived from the original on September 16, 2012.
- "Tony Blair's Remarks To Al From Tribute Dinner." 16 June 2009 on YouTube
