= Progressive Internationalism: A Democratic National Security Strategy =

Proposed national security policy report

"Progressive Internationalism: A Democratic National Security Strategy" is a proposed national security policy report for the U.S. Democratic Party, published by the Progressive Policy Institute in October 2003.

Its authors, all Democrats, are:

- Ronald D. Asmus
- James R. Blaker
- Lael Brainard
- Kurt Campbell
- Greg Craig
- Larry Diamond
- Michèle Flournoy
- Philip Gordon
- Edward Gresser
- Bob Kerrey
- Will Marshall
- Michael McFaul
- Steven J. Nider
- Kenneth Pollack
- Jeremy Rosner

The document is often cited as an exposé of liberal hawk thinking. It declares support for the American-led overthrow of the Taliban regime in Afghanistan and for the 2003 war in Iraq, but criticizes the administration of George W. Bush for weakening America's standing in the world and for relying too much on military force to solve problems.
