= New Democrats (United States) =

Ideological faction within the Democratic Party

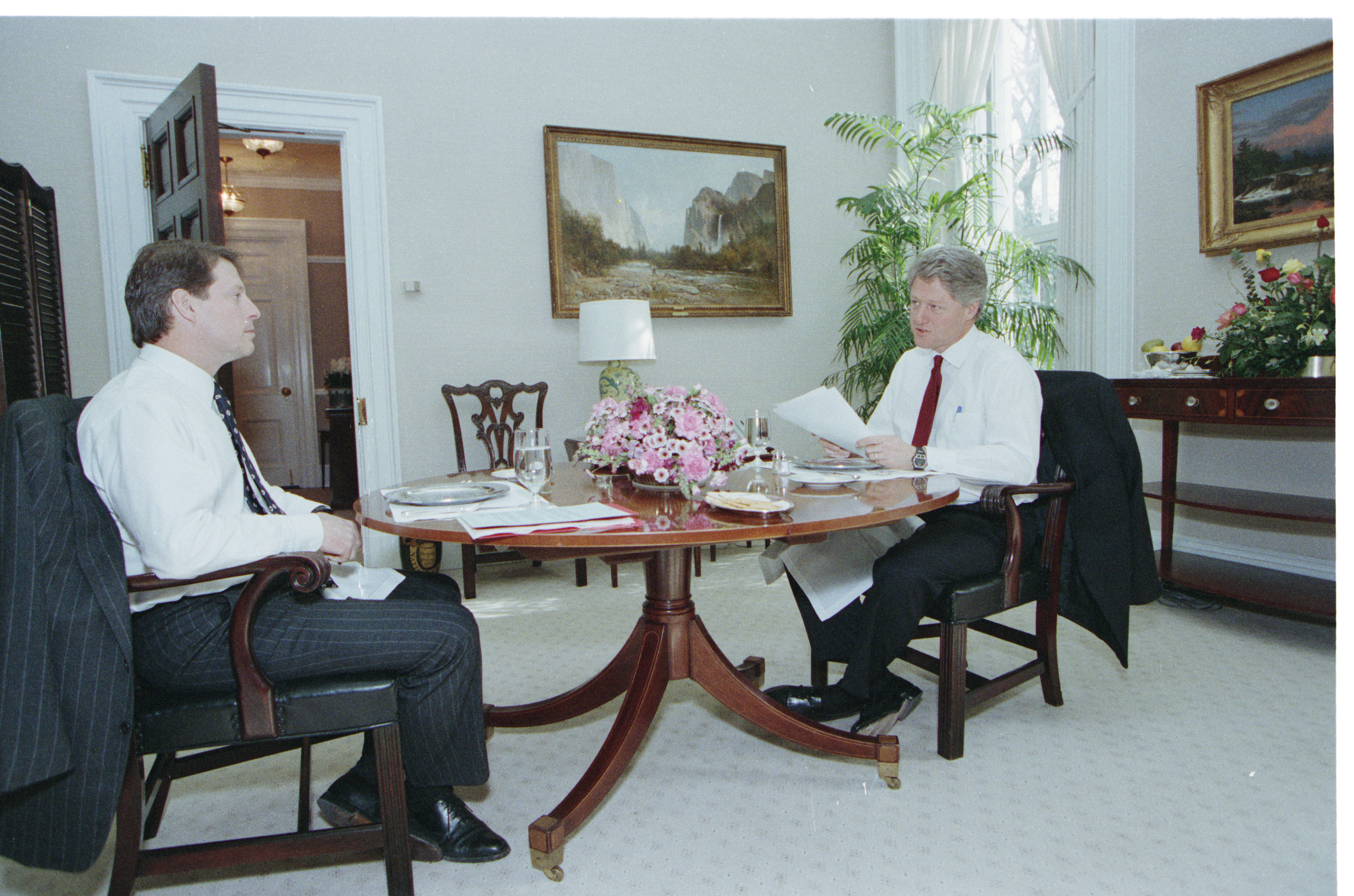
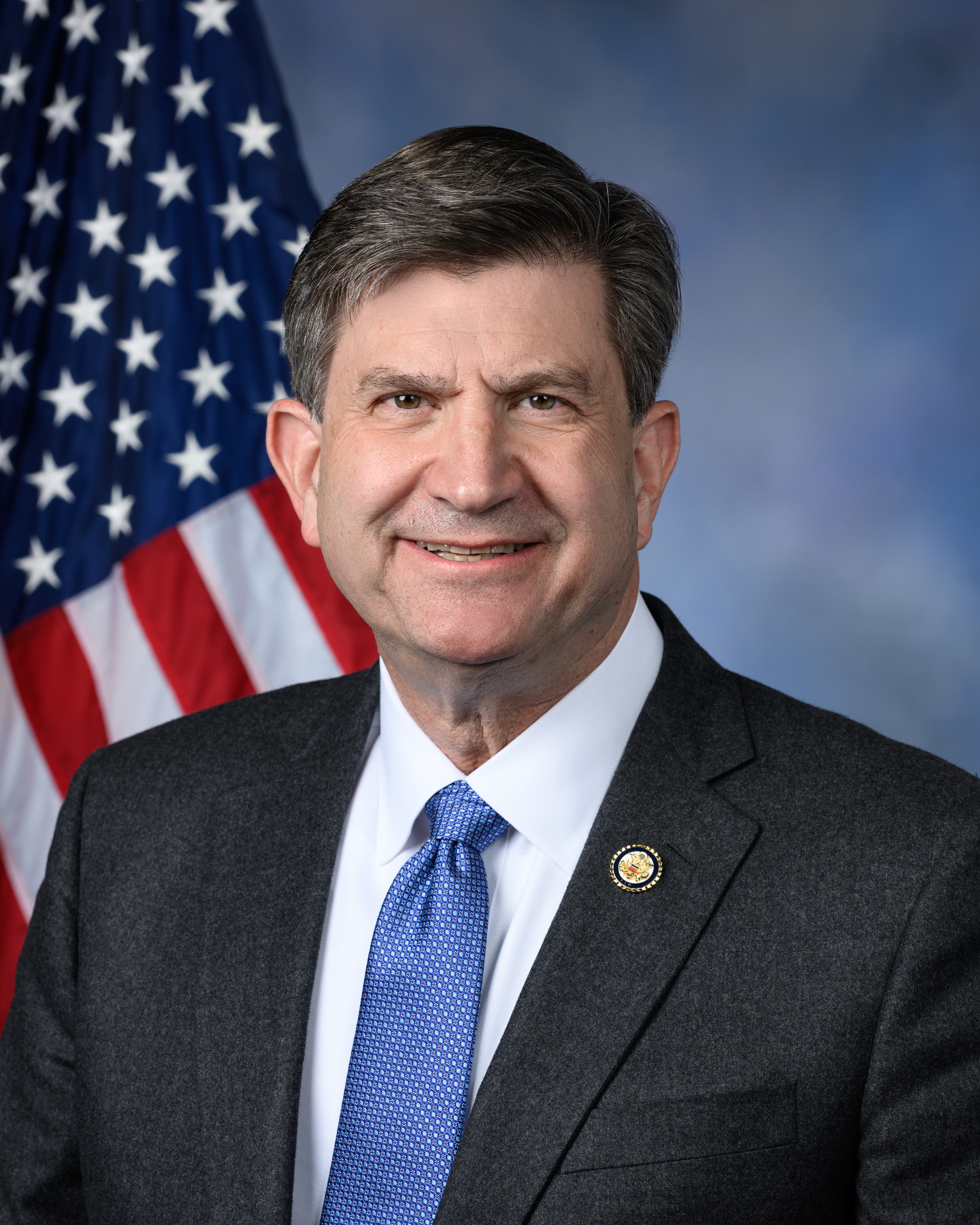
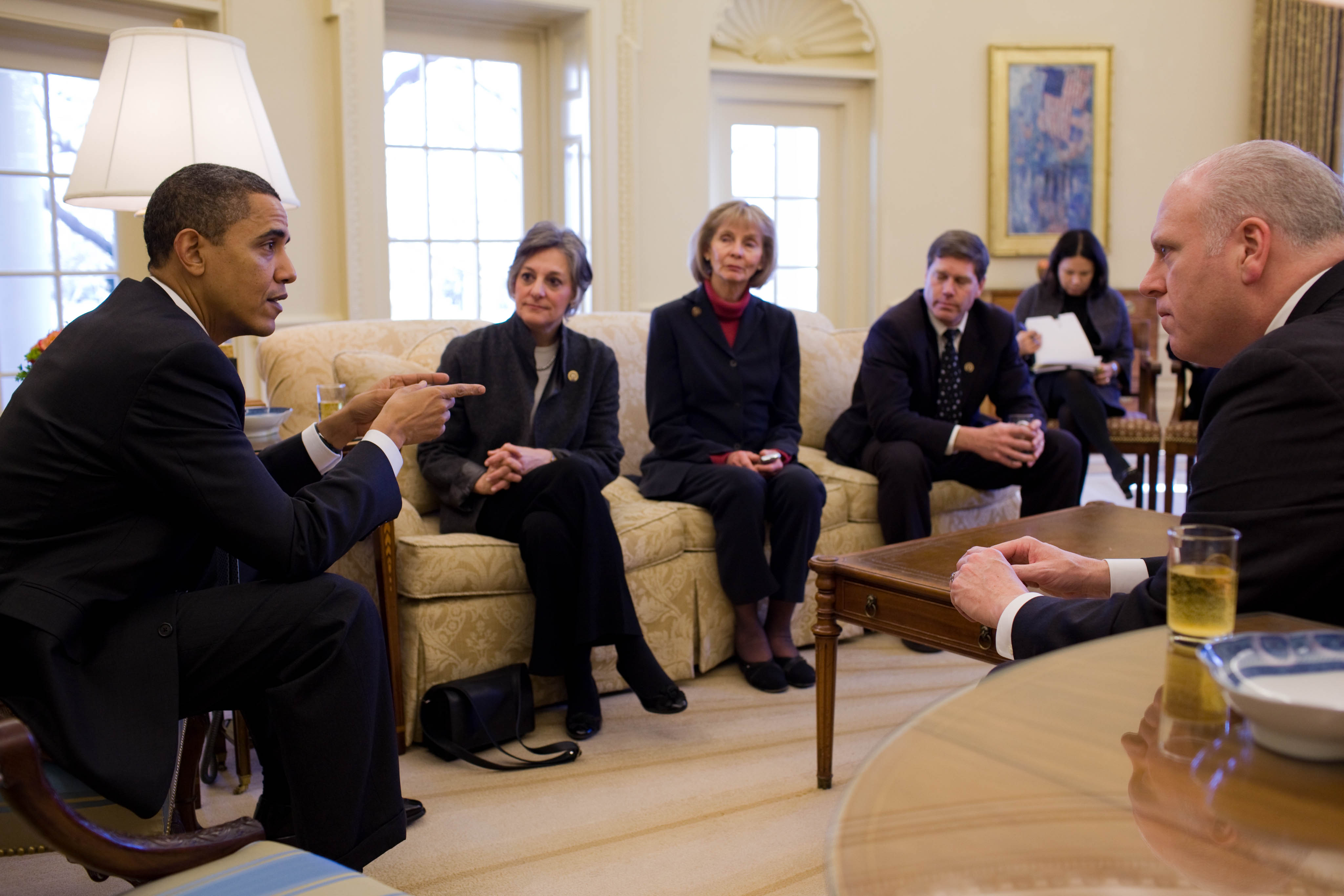
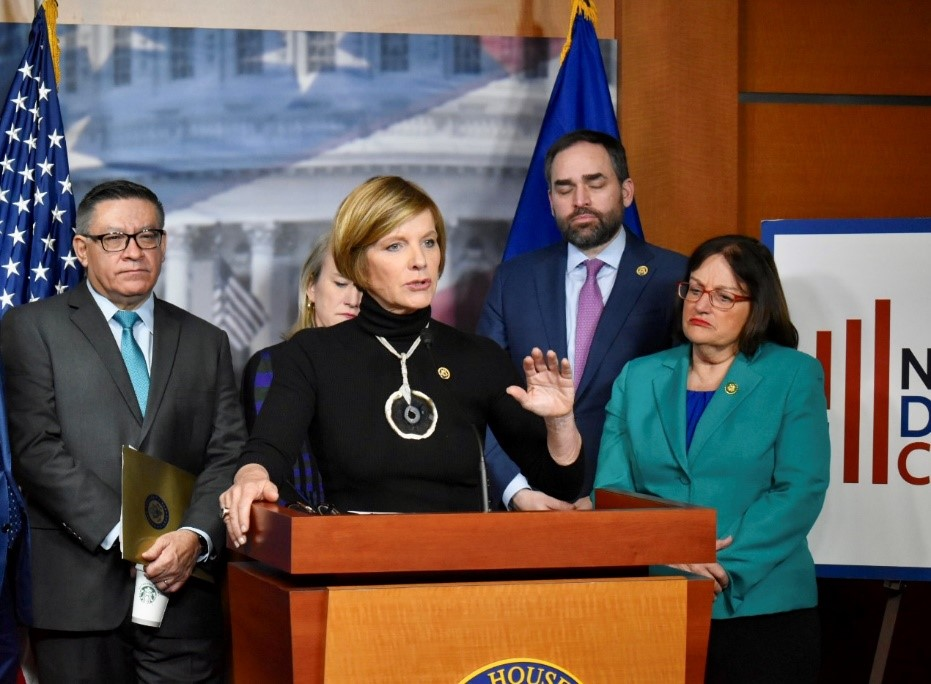
- From left to right, top to bottom: President Clinton and Vice Pres. Gore at first working lunch, 1993; Brad Schneider, New Democrat Coalition chair, 2025; President Obama meets with NDC, 2010; Susie Lee unveiling border plan, 2024
- Ideology: Liberalism (U.S.): Neoliberalism; Third Way; Neo-Keynesianism Economic globalization Liberal internationalism Obama Doctrine
- Political position: Centre to centre-left
- Colors: Navy blue

The New Democrats, often referred to as Moderate Democrats, are a centrist and liberal faction within the United States Democratic Party. They are seen as culturally liberal on social issues while being fiscally conservative on certain economic issues. New Democrats dominated the party from the late 1980s through the early-2010s and continue to be a large coalition in the modern Democratic Party.

With the rise of progressivism in 2016 and 2020 amidst the presidential campaigns of Bernie Sanders, and that of the right-wing populism of Donald Trump, New Democrats began to change and update their ideological positions. Debates over tax cuts on capital gains have been reconfigured to removing caps on state and local tax deduction (SALT).

In 2024, at least two out of nine freshmen in the Congressional Progressive Caucus planned to also hold seats in the New Democrat Coalition (NDC), joining an additional twenty-two House Democrats who similarly claimed membership in both caucuses. The NDC lost approximately five members, yet gained twenty-three, reestablishing the coalition as the leading Democratic partisan caucus in Congress.

Brad Schneider, who spearheaded "plans" and "proposals" for SALT deduction caps as NDC platform planks, is NDC chairperson in the 119th United States Congress. Schneider endorsed Sharice Davids, his former rival for NDC chair, as Honorary Chair of the NDC ReNew Democracy Foundation (distinct from the Renew Democracy Initiative). In the aftermath of the 2024 United States presidential election, New Democrats raised concerns about increasing numbers of CPC members joining the NDC, but did not address the reverse happening to the CPC prior to the election.

== History ==
=== Origins ===
During the 1970s energy crisis, the United States faced stagflation, that is, both increasing inflation and decreasing economic growth. The 1974 midterm elections, according to historian Brent Cebul, "are remembered for the arrival of the 'Watergate babies' in the House of Representatives, but the New Democrats' first electoral wave was broader and deeper still...some western and northeastern officials like [Michael] Dukakis were dubbed Atari Democrats thanks to their veneration of new, entrepreneurial, high-technology sectors of the economy. This group, which included [Gary] Hart and California Governor Jerry Brown, also sometimes called themselves 'New Liberals' in an effort to signal their support for traditional liberal social values even as they pursued market-oriented and perhaps less bureaucratic ways of governing." Another "primary strand" could be found in "the South, often as self-consciously 'centrist' Democrats. Led by politicians like Georgia Senator Sam Nunn, the southern centrists echoed southern Democrats of the past in their skepticism for targeted welfare or antipoverty programs, and they also looked forward to stimulating the region's post-industrial and 'post-racial' future."

A productivity deficit as a possible factor in 1970s economic turbulence, and structural or statistical analyses thereof, helped to reshape Democratic partisan platforms. Simon Torracinta argues that, "by the Nixon period, the narrative of the service transition had become mainstream wisdom", resulting in the establishment of the National Commission on Productivity (NCP). Before assessing postindustrial productivity, the non-partisan commission first had to determine what productivity entailed in the service sector. Torracinta contends that, in service domains such as "teaching, in which the quality itself is judged in terms of the labor involved, productivity increases were intrinsically limited or unsystematic—a phenomenon extended to government, education, arts, restaurants, retailing, and leisure." Despite scholarly conflict over which meanings to ascribe to productivity in a postindustrial economy, bipartisan fiscal advisors attempted to apply structural models such as the Baumol effect ("cost disease"), where "all such services would face unavoidably cumulative increases in real costs as against manufactured goods." The industrial sector, its productivity measured by statistics on goods produced, bore the burden of stagnant postindutrial productivity. Since the Baumol "ratio of outputs of the two sectors remained constant", then an "ever-greater proportion of the labor force would be occupied in the 'nonprogressive' sector while the labor employed in the 'progressive' sector would approach zero." Industrial productivity outpacing postindutrial productivity in turn spurred a "declining rate of growth compared to the growth of the labor force."

Dual-sector macroeconomic models for structural change proved difficult to apply without first confirming service sector productivity as a cause for instability and, even more importantly, without understanding how postindustrial productivity manifested itself in microeconomics. These concerns did not prevent the NCP from proposing solutions to a service productivity problem, even if non-partisan commissioners could not articulate what service productivity was in the first place, much less whether postindustrial services made the U.S. economy unstable. The first such solution was to "personalize productivity, turning output back into a motivational issue. At the level of public relations, then, the problem of productivity became conflated with a simple problem of effort", culminating in the "Sign Your Work" promotional campaign. Yet continuing debates over how to exactly evaluate service productivity amid intangible products such as teaching, government, and healthcare, belied the fact that a solution had been proposed without fully understanding the conflation, the problem, or its causes. Scholarly and partisan consensus over the failure of "Sign Your Work" facilitated the rise of another proposed criterion to determine service productivity: postindustrial "innovation", which had ostensibly fueled advances in technological research and development. Although replacing one indeterminate postindustrial concept with another, this shift in solutions pushed Democratic partisan thought into new spheres of "supply-side" economics.

The Watergate Babies and Atari Democrats found a common thread in what historian Brent Cebul describes as twentieth-century "supply-side liberalism", an antecedent to the fiscal ideas of 21st-century "supply-side liberals, or supply-side progressives." This ideology, derived partly from their consultations with partisan boll weevils, ultimately proved a fiscal illusion. Cebul further contends that "Michael Dukakis and Jerry Brown, for instance, both appropriated property taxes to subsidize a given startup company in depressed industrial sectors. This subsidization transformed state tax revenue for public finance into venture capital. Once the first wave of startups achieved normal profit, then the tax burden for additional start-ups would shift from real estate investors and homeowners to the initial companies. Brown and Dukakis also planned on allocating revenue from the new taxable capital to "infrastructure and education." According to Cebul, one of the "mistakes" of twentieth-century "supply-side liberalism", an unwillingness to propose "certain types of progressive regulations along with those subsidies", could be avoided by twenty-first century "supply-side liberals." During the Jimmy Carter and Ronald Reagan Administrations, voter tax revolts and the Volcker recession, coupled with uneven profit thresholds for taxing scaled-up companies, hastened the shift in tax burden to the entire first wave.

Even if absent from partisan politics for one or more election cycles, "supply-side liberals" could and did campaign to reconcile "job and tax generation with the market-oriented ethos of the 1980s" during reelection bids. Once back in office during the early 1980s recession in the United States, Dukakis and his cohort incrementally diverged from "supply-side liberalism" as it operated prior to the tax revolts. Beginning in 1982, for instance, Dukakis altered the role of his Massachusetts Technology Development Corporation (1978) from tax revenue distribution to "broker[ing] deals" between "high-tech companies and Boston-based venture capital firms." This gradual change diminished his own role in the ensuing Massachusetts Miracle, a cornerstone of his campaign during the 1988 United States presidential election. Conversely, 1980s changes later became key tenets of New Democrat platforms.

=== Democratic Leadership Council and Progressive Policy Institute ===
After the landslide defeats by the Republican Party led by Ronald Reagan and George H. W. Bush, a group of prominent Democrats began to believe their party was out of touch and in need of a radical shift in economic policy and ideas of governance. The Democratic Leadership Council (DLC) was founded in 1985 by Al From and a group of like-minded politicians and strategists. Prominent Democratic politicians such as Senators Al Gore and Joe Biden (both future vice presidents, and Biden, a future president) participated in DLC affairs prior to their candidacies for the 1988 Democratic Party nomination. The DLC did not want the Democratic Party to be "simply posturing in the middle", and instead framed its ideas as "progressive" and as a "Third Way" to address the problems of its era. Examples of the DLC's policy initiatives can be found in The New American Choice Resolutions.

In 1989, the "New Democrat" label was briefly used by a progressive reformist group including Gary Hart and Eugene McCarthy. That same year, Will Marshall founded the Progressive Policy Institute (PPI) as a think tank to formulate a new common platform for Atari Democrts, Watergate Babies, Yellow Dog Democrats, and Conservative Democrats among the Yellow Dogs. In 1990, the DLC renamed its bi-monthly magazine from The Mainstream Democrat to The New Democrat. The PPI, in conjunction with Arkansas Governor Bill Clinton and the DLC, subsequently introduced tentative precepts collected in a New Orleans Declaration. By 1992, "New Democrats" had become more widely associated with this declaration, as well as Democratic partisans who entwined presidential hopeful Jesse Jackson's variant of Rainbow/PUSH with the Sister Souljah moment.

Aspirations for "supply-side liberalism" had been rebuffed by voters and state auditors alike. According to Cebul, the rechristened "New Democrats" espoused "a reflexive veneration of the market as the essential underwriter of social progress". They first sought to accelerate capital and money coursing through a post-industrial economy. The PPI and DLC forecasted financial deregulation and tax cuts as avenues to facilitate the expansion of scaleup companies invested in computational and internet technology. These companies would provide the venture capital necessary to pave over ailing industrial regions with post-industrial start-ups. The role of government was to remove any perceived obstacles. Heeding the lessons of tax resistance, the New Democrat think tank and leadership council also aimed to reduce the federal deficit and interest rates, while expanding the mortgage-backed security industry and credit market for a real estate sector that had roundly rejected property taxes. The voters who had stymied "supply side liberalism" would become a New Democrat vanguard.

Bill Clinton, the DLC chairman who referred to the PPI as his "idea mill", faced a peculiar dilemma. He had to somehow circumvent voter preconceptions of financial deregulatory laws and capital gains tax reductions as antithetical to "social progress", while concurrently accepting the duty of the largest party plurality, namely to advance the mid- to late 20th-century Democratic partisan goal of "social progress." Cebul and additional scholars conclude that the DLC as well as PPI, and Clinton more specifically, offered a possible solution: cast "the poor as unrealized entrepreneurs and impoverished communities as untapped 'new markets' ", ostensibly combining financial deregulation with claims for "social progress" in syncretic politics. After the 1988 elections that perpetuated the Reagan era, a deemphasis on purity tests did not seem such a controversial goal for a new national Democratic Party leader. In February 1992, Andrew Kopkind first described the attempt to reconcile "social progress" with financial deregulation as "the ideology of Clintonism."

=== The New Covenant ===
Historians such as James D. Boys contend that Clinton's "grand strategy, grand rhetoric" of "courting blue-collar voters" resulted in a series of 1991 speeches to the DLC and his alma mater Georgetown University on a possible "New Covenant" platform. Clinton pledged " 'a New Covenant of change that will honor middle-class values...and make America work again.' " In the context of global commerce, Clinton warned that protectionism was " 'a fancy word for giving up; our New Covenant must include a new trade policy that says to Europe, Japan, and our other trading partners: we favour an open trading system, but if you won't play by those rules, we'll play by yours.' " The "New Covenant" was Clinton's attempt "to position his candidacy in a broad historical narrative. It was not, however, an expression that captured the public's imagination", in contrast to Donald Trump's later "Make America Great Again."

Clinton advisor Benjamin Barber credited William Galston for coining the "New Choice" slogan and for reconfiguring it as a "New Covenant." Galston, an NDC alum, focused on "rhetoric, strategy, and vision." Galston formulated the slogan to define "the president's early interest in public–private partnerships" and an approach to "responsibility" that wedded voters to delegates. According to Barber, Galston invoked "covenant" to connote "American Puritanism" and the "social contract tradition that was part of America's founding." The phrase held "iconic value for the early Clinton agenda", despite its "short shelf life." Less than a year after declining to continue as Secretary of Labor, Robert Reich reported that "the two main accomplishments of the first year were passage of the first budget" and the North American Free Trade Agreement. By the second year, "almost sixty percent of the public now approves of the job B is doing as president, if polls can be believed." During a dinner with Bill Clinton, Clare Dalton, and Hillary Clinton, the latter two decried an imbalanced ratio of CEO incomes to wages of " 'loyal workers' " and renounced corporations that defined " 'downsizing' " as " 'middle-class' " layoffs. Bill Clinton replied that he "shouldn't be out in front on these issues. I can't be criticizing [corporations].' "

John Nichols, writing in The Progressive during the Presidency of George W. Bush, further argued that the 1992 presidential campaign team engaged in a "more populist 'people first' rhetoric...Clinton's 1992 scramble away from DLC language came as no surprise." Stan Greenberg, for example, noted that Clinton's approval ratings did not increase " 'until he rejected the advice of conservatives of the party' and began to adopt populist and distinctly non-DLC rhetoric." New Democrats "did much to define the first two years of the Clinton Presidency", which, according to Nichols, contributed to a Republican Revolution precipitated by "the failure of millions of working class voters to go to the polls." In the aftermath, "DLC cadres" distanced themselves from NAFTA, adopted remnants of "New Covenant" rhetoric, and "formed the New Democrat Network, a well-funded group dedicated to electing and reelecting corporation-friendly Democrats." As a result, the DLC "expanded the House membership after both the 1996 and 1998 elections." Additional critics attribute the 1994 losses to the Omnibus Budget Reconciliation Act of 1993 and the Clinton health care plan of 1993.

In late September 1992, Joan Didion observed a shift, rather than "failure", in meanings ascribed to a "New Covenant" by the Clinton campaign. She underscored those "who wanted to dance with the Gores, join the club' " as pressured to critique the seemingly " 'brain-dead policies in both parties', most noticeably their own." The way to a " 'New Covenant' " was, by the last month of the campaign, " 'not conservative or liberal, in many ways it is not even Republican or Democratic.' "

One of the last public references to a "New Covenant" was the 1995 State of the Union Address. By the second half of his first term, even while the First Lady struggled with her proposed healthcare plan, "New Covenant" came to signify various counterpoints to Congressional Republican bills and platforms, most notably the Contract with America. Clinton, increasingly acting on counsel from Dick Morris, had begun to entertain new frameworks for political economy, society, and culture, reconceiving the New Democrat "social progress" dilemma and the DLC approach to political thought. He sought advisors that would, in turn, move beyond syncretic politics and attempt to shape a new Democratic Party, in a new way.

=== Presidency of Bill Clinton ===
The first inauguration of Bill Clinton on 20 January 1993. Clinton's 1992 presidential campaign ushered in the "golden age" of New Democrats, which subsequently gave birth to the name "Clinton Democrat".

Bill Clinton became the Democratic politician most identified with the New Democrats due to his promise of welfare reform in the 1992 presidential campaign, his 1992 promise of a middle-class tax cut and his 1993 expansion of the Earned Income Tax Credit for the working poor. The campaign occurred shortly after the end of the Cold War, at a time when faith in capitalism and internationalism were at their height, providing an opportunity for Bill Clinton to focus on domestic policy. New Democrats subsequently aligned with Joseph Schumpeter's innovation economics and creative destruction as revolution, as well as concomitant criticism of intellectual property laws and almost all political purity tests, in order to sustain their budding framework for a post-industrial political economy.

The Electoral College results for the 1992 presidential election. Clinton's New Democrat strategy won over a considerable number of rural and white voters in both the Midwest and the South.

Clinton presented himself as a New Democrat candidate and continued to appeal to white middle-class voters who had left the Democratic Party for the Republican Party. He promised to "end welfare as we know it." Until 2016 and even after, the Third Way defined and dominated notions of centrism in U.S. partisan politics. Political analysts such as Kenneth Baer further that the DLC embodied the spirit of Truman–Kennedy era Democrats and were vital to the Democratic Party's resurgence after the failure of the George McGovern, Walter Mondale, and Michael Dukakis presidential campaigns.

=== Neoliberalism ===
Lily Geismer, a historian at Claremont McKenna College, argues that a number of scholars have "flattened and obscured the important ways that the Clintons and other New Democrats’ promotion of the market and the role of government was distinct from Ronald Reagan, Milton Friedman, and their followers. The principles and policies Clinton and the DLC espoused were not solely a defensive reaction to the Republican Party...rather, their vision represents parts of a coherent ideology that sought to both maintain and reformulate key aspects of liberalism itself." Democratic partisan factions, spearheaded by the Atari Democrats and Southern Democrats, came together to deploy a "form of self-description and differentiation" as “new Democrats.” In 1982, "Washington Monthly Editor Charles Peters published 'A Neo-Liberal's Manifesto,' which aimed to lay out the core principles of this group." In 1984, one year before the establishment of the DLC, "journalist Randall Rothenberg wrote a book called The Neoliberals that sought to codify and celebrate this cohort's ascendency." Geismer distinguishes Colloque Walter Lippmann (1938) references and conceptions of "neoliberalism" from New Democrat interpretations and applications of the same. This distinction is crucial in order "to seek a more precise understanding of what I call 'Democratic neoliberalism.' "

Quinn Slobodian contends that the "big tent of neoliberalism" principally advances the belief that "the state plays an important, proactive role in encasing the market from challenges to the market order, and often in rolling out new policies that produce more market-friendly outcomes and realities." The "big tent" can include multi-caucus politicos described as libertarian Democrats, but also "these radical libertarians, who are more often at the margins, who think that the state can be abolished altogether...they are within the world of the neoliberal religion but constitute a kind of radical sect within it — it's hard to know where to put them, the same way that one wouldn't know where to put breakaway sects of Christianity or Islam when they take issue with the mainline version of the ideology."

==== Bipartisan Bill Proposals and Acts (1992–2000) ====
New Democrats dialectically adopted Republicans proposals and platforms during the campaigns for the 1992 congressional/state elections and 1992 United States presidential election. As a result, particularly after the 1994 midterm elections when Republicans regained control of Congress, they signed legislation endorsed by Republicans, although not all Democrats supported this move. Both the Defense of Marriage Act and Personal Responsibility and Work Opportunity Act (PRWOA) became law three months before the 1996 United States elections. It was in his 1996 State of the Union Address that Clinton declared: "The era of big government is over." After Clinton vetoed two versions of the bill that ultimately became PRWOA, "Svengali-like advisor Dick Morris---upon whom Clinton had grown increasingly dependent, politically and psychologically, in the aftermath of the 1994 debacle---insisted that a third veto could cost him his reelection in 1996."

Legislation that received bipartisan support under President Clinton included:

- The North American Free Trade Agreement, a core international agreement signed during the presidency of George H. W. Bush without NAALC/NAAEC and required Congressional approval for implementation. It is still largely in effect via the succeeding USMCA and proposed Indo-Pacific Economic Framework.
- The Don't Ask, Don't Tell ban on openly gay people serving in the Armed Forces (repealed in 2010).
- The Defense of Marriage Act that prohibited the federal government from recognizing same-sex marriages. It was ruled unconstitutional by the U.S. Supreme Court in 2015 and repealed in 2022, the latter with support from 24% of Congressional Republicans.
- The Religious Freedom Restoration Act federal religious discrimination statute.
- The Violent Crime Control and Law Enforcement Act, sometimes referred to as the 1994 Omnibus Crime Bill.

Legislative examples of bipartisan authorship included:

- 1996 Defense of Marriage Act: Bob Barr (R-GA) (Republican introduction)
- 1996 Personal Responsibility and Work Opportunity Act: John Kasich (R-OH) with ideas and provisions from Clinton's 1994 proposal
- 1997 Taxpayer Relief Act: John Kasich (R-OH) with ideas and provisions from New Democrats
- 1999 Gramm-Leach-Bliley Act: Phil Gramm (R-TX), Jim Leach (R-IA), and Thomas J. Bliley Jr. (R-VA) with ideas and provisions from New Democrats

Congressional Democrat voting percentages for the foregoing examples:

- 1996 Defense of Marriage Act: 64% Democratic Representatives support and 72% Democratic Senators support
- 1996 Personal Responsibility and Work Opportunity Act: 50% Democratic Representatives support and 53% Democratic Senators support
- 1997 Taxpayer Relief Act: 80% Democratic Representatives support and 82% Democratic Senators support
- 1999 Gramm-Leach-Bliley Act: 75% Democratic Representatives support and 84% Democratic Senators support

The Clinton Administration, supported by congressional New Democrats, was responsible for proposing and passing the Omnibus Budget Reconciliation Act of 1993, which increased Medicare taxes for taxpayers with annual incomes over $135,000, yet also reduced Medicare spending and benefits across all tax brackets. Congressional Republicans demanded even deeper cuts to Medicare but Clinton twice vetoed their bills. The Clinton Administration in turn taxed individuals earning annual incomes over $115,000 but also defined taxable small business earnings as high as $10 million in annual gross revenue, with tax brackets for "high-gross incorporated businesses" beginning at that number. According to the Clinton Foundation, the revised brackets and categories increased taxes on the wealthiest 1.2% of taxpayers within these new brackets, while cutting taxes on 15 million low-income families and making tax cuts available to 90% of small businesses. Small businesses and taxpayer classifications were reconfigured by these new tax brackets.

Clinton's promise of welfare reform was passed in the form of the Personal Responsibility and Work Opportunity Act of 1996. Prior to 2018, critics such as Yascha Mounk contended that Clinton's arguments for the virtues of "negative" notions of "personal responsibility", such as the New Orleans Declaration's "individual responsibility" propounded within DLC circles during the 1980s, stemmed more from Reagan's specific conception of "accountability" than any "positive notion of responsibility". Additional critics distinguish the New Democrat idea of "personal responsibility" from arguments over the extent of limitations on government, if any, in platforms that advance social responsibility. The 1996 United States presidential election, Dick Morris' advice to relegate Hillary Clinton to lecturing on the global promotion of microcredit, partisan compromises over this act, conflicts within the Democratic Party, as well as the act's multivalent consequences, all contributed to deliberations over passage and execution of the PRWORA.

Democratic partisan criticism of the first Clinton Administration, as well as the formation of the Blue Dog Coalition, particularly in response to proposals and actions by the First Lady, followed 1994 congressional New Democrat losses in the southeast and west coast. Clinton's reassertion as a New Democrat during the 1996 presidential elections, and passage of the PRWORA, contributed to the founding of the New Democrat Coalition, reaffirming Clintonian Democrats as New Democrats. As of August 2023, 23% of the New Democrat Coalition have become simultaneous members of, or declared an intention to vote for more proposals by, the Congressional Progressive Caucus. A number of these delegates, most notably Shri Thanedar, faced backlash from pundits and constituents alike, as evidence surfaced of alleged involvement in post-2016 attempts to rally neoconservatism. Despite the controversy, certain delegates were reelected in 2024, including Thanedar.

=== The Third Way ===
During 1985–1991 electoral campaigns, various members of the DLC inconsistently touted different planks of their respective candidate platforms as "third way." Then, in 1992, New Democrats streamlined the notion of a "third way" as part of the national Democratic Party platform, specifically in the "Opporunity" section following the preamble, a "New Covenant with the American People." The platform coalesced canddiate "third way" planks into a national partisan critique of "big government theory that says we can hamstring business and tax and spend our way to prosperity. Instead we offer a third way." The new Democratic Party would henceforth "favor a third way beyond the old approaches—to put government back on the side of citizens who play by the rules. We believe that by what it says and how it conducts its business, government must once again make [negative] responsibility an instrument of national purpose." Once in office, the Clinton Administration disseminated this notion of a Third Way "through meetings with foreign leaders and international conferences." Days after Clinton took the oath of office, Al From met with Labour Party (UK) delegates Tony Blair and Gordon Brown. From guided the DLC "to see itself as the American franchise of a worldwide movement — the pioneer of a new ideological project for the center-left" that initiated a "global revolution of the politics of the Left."

From later recounted the events of a 1997 Clinton White House summit with New Labour proponents at Chequers, the country meeting house for British prime ministers. From recalled that the newly-elected Blair took a paper out of his pocket, informing this delegation that this paper was a summation of his " 'notes from our first meeting during the Clinton transition.' " The paper contained three concepts from the 1992 Democratic Party platform that Blair had deemed the most important: " 'Opportunity, responsibility, community.' " These planks would become core tenets of Blair's "New Democrat-New Labour" broadening of the Third Way. For From and his New Democrat guests, Blair demonstrated "his understanding of these terms and their significance for the consolidation of third-way power across the Atlantic." Soon thereafter, an "excited" and "eager" From reported to the DLC that this transatlantic expansion of " 'the Third Way should seem very familiar to New Democrats...It is our politics.' ” In February 1998, when the prime minister met directly with Clinton, pundits on both sides of the Atlantic reported rumors that Blair intended to replace the Socialist International, a "global alliance" between "social-democratic parties" and democratic socialists, with his expansion of the 1992 Democratic partisan "third way" into a "Third Way International."

In rapid succession, Blair "implemented a series of initiatives right out of the DLC's 'reinventing government' playbook", later labeled Blairism. His British constituents, however, considered the initiatives as part of an "off-the-rack plan to Americanize British politics...others assailed third-way politics for its lack of depth and its refusal to stand for much of anything." In response, political scientist Anthony Giddens wrote and published The Third Way: The Renewal of Social Democracy (1998). The book elucidated Giddens' duality of structure in "social systems", a total unity of opposites in the transatlantic sociopolitics of the "Third Way International." He "sought to provide theoretical underpinnings to Blair's rhetoric", advancing a " 'radical centre' that focused on 'radical solutions' to meet the problems of the age."

New Democrat concepts appropriated by neoconservative supporters and neoconservative critics of U.S. foreign policy during the presidency of George W. Bush prompted institutionalization of the "Third Way International." In 2005, Matt Bennett, Jonathan Cowen, Nancy Hale, and Jim Kessler co-founded a public policy think tank, the eponymous Third Way. The organization currently "champions moderate policy and political ideas. Our work on the center left acts as a critical bulwark against political extremism." Think tank members "describe themselves passionate moderates—or 'radical centrists' per the New York Times", focusing on a "commitment to democratic capitalism", the power of "a center-left coalition", favoring "progress over purity tests" and "reform not revolution."

=== Presidency of Barack Obama ===
Barack Obama, the 44th president (2009–2017)

In March 2009, Barack Obama, said in a meeting with the New Democrat Coalition that he was a "New Democrat" and a "pro-growth Democrat", that he "supports free and fair trade", and that he was "very concerned about a return to protectionism". In 2008, George Packer argued that Barack Obama, as a New Democrat president-elect, had to reconcile "the 'post-partisan 'Obama' and the 'progressive' Obama. Some tension exists between these two approaches." Many Obama cabinet picks and House and Senate Democrats were New Democrats. From 2007 to 2011, the New Democrats were the leading swing bloc in the House, and were the main authors of the legislation on bailouts and financial regulation of derivatives. The Democratic Leadership Council (DLC), which gave rise to New Democrats but that since the 2000s had lost some of its influence, and the DLC closed down in February 2011 due to financial issues; however, New Democrats remained influential through the Third Way organization, and New Democrats proved key swing votes in subsequent years. During his presidency, pundits debated if Obama moved to the left, citing the lack of the DLC's influence from its heydays, or whether, forced by Republican gains in Congress, he doubled down on triangulation.

The Obama Administration espoused "free and fair trade" ideas. Trans-Pacific Partnership (TPP) proponents postponed TPP drafting after Obama became President, only to commence formal Trans-Pacific Partnership negotiations in 2010, after Executive Office (EO) disclosure of an endorsement, albeit with Obama's proposed revisions on, for instance, intellectual property. Early drafts of Executive Order 13609 principally by Cass Sunstein, "Promoting International Regulatory Cooperation", buttressed the TPP deliberations with the premise that "inadequate cooperation and consultation" had been caused by "excessive red tape" for "businesses, particularly small- and medium-sized enterprises operating near the border." In the final draft, Obama advisors such as Sunstein applied the Executive Order to all such "enterprises", in the absence of regional and tax bracket classifications, operating within "North America and beyond." Sunstein later proposed thirty-two criteria for defining such policy frameworks as "liberal", especially to advance "the right to private property" (not always totally devoid of a "progressive income tax") and to remedy the vagaries of what he perceives as groupthink. In 2015, the Obama EO released "The Economic Benefits of U.S. Trade", a signatory framework for prospective drafts of the TPP and Transatlantic Trade and Investment Partnership (TTIP). According to the Obama EO, free trade "help[s] developing countries lift people out of poverty" and "expand[s] markets for U.S. exports."

Throughout Obama's tenure, approximately 1,000 Democrats lost their seats across all levels of government. Specifically, 958 state legislature seats, 62 House seats, 11 Senate seats, and 12 governorships, with a majority of these elected officials identifying as New Democrats. Some analysts, such as Harry Enten at FiveThirtyEight, believe this was due to the changing demographic shift, as more Democrats identified as liberal in 2016 than moderate. Consequently, many pundits believed that Obama's tenure marked an end of the New Democrats' dominance in the party, although the faction still remains an important part of the party's big tent. Obama signed the draft Trans-Pacific Partnership, yet subsequently declared his "Economic Benefits of Free Trade" framework as "dead" prior to the lame-duck session of Congress, in anticipation of bipartisan opposition to TPP ratification.

=== 2010s and 2020s ===
Historian Gary Gerstle argues that support for neoliberalism declined in the United States in both parties in 2016, with both Trumpism and progressivism opposing central tenets of neoliberalism. For example, Trump and Sanders both opposed the Transatlantic Pacific Partnership during the 2016 United States presidential election. President Trump then refused to sign any draft TPP, precluding further revisions to garner U.S. participation. In contrast, Trump initially indicated willingness to continue TTIP negotiations with substantial changes. On the eve of the COVID-19 pandemic, the TTIP dissolved into trade disputes between the European Union (EU) and the Trump Administration. Trump's approach to curbing the pandemic became the focus of EU delegate concerns, superseding the unresolved trade conflicts. Despite this, New Democrats have continued to be a large coalition within the big tent of the Democratic Party. In 2021, Jennifer Berrera, president of the California Chamber of Commerce, endorsed a tenacious and "rugged band of independent-minded Democrats", variously referred to as " 'moderate Democrats' or 'new Democrats'...hailing from more conservative regions, including many with influential Hispanic populations." This "band", maintains and maintains Berrera, "shares common aims with statewide Democratic Party leaders, but "also shares a keen appreciation for the costs of overreach in terms of economic opportunity and job creation."

==== Hillary Clinton presidential campaign ====
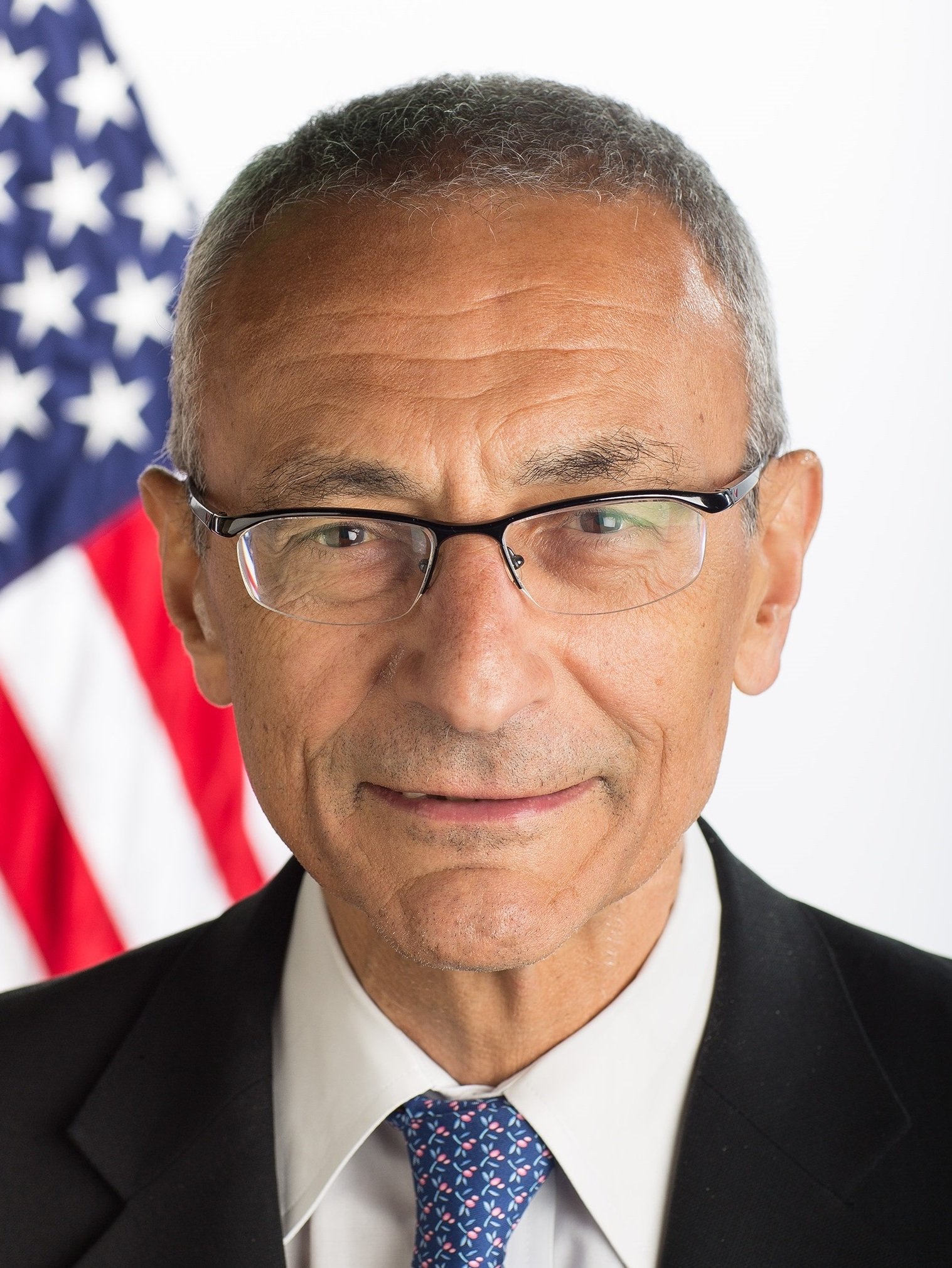
John Podesta served as an advisor to all three U.S. Presidents who led the New Democrats.

Ahead of the 2016 Democratic Party presidential primaries, many New Democrats were backing the presidential campaign of Hillary Clinton, the wife of former New Democrat president Bill Clinton, who served as a senator from New York during the 2000s and as Barack Obama's Secretary of State during the early 2010s. Originally considered to be an expected nominee, Clinton faced an unexpected challenge from Vermont Senator, Bernie Sanders, whose campaign garnered the support of progressive and younger Democrats. Ultimately, Clinton won 34 of the 57 contests, (Note: Although there are 50 states, the Democratic primaries include contests in six U.S. territories, and one contest of Democrats Abroad, who are American expatriates.) compared to Sanders' 23, and garnered about 55 percent of the vote. Nevertheless, commentators saw the primary as a decline in the strength of New Democrats in the party, and an increasing influence of progressive Democrats within the party.

Ahead of the formal announcement of the 2016 Democratic National Convention, WikiLeaks published the Democratic National Committee email leak, in which DNC operatives, many of whom were New Democrats, seemed to deride Sanders' campaign, and discuss ways to advance Clinton's nomination, leading to the resignation of DNC chair, and New Democrat member, Debbie Wasserman Schultz and other implicated officials. The leak was allegedly part of an operation by the Russian government to undermine Hillary Clinton.

Although the ensuing controversy initially focused on emails that dated from relatively late in the primary, when Clinton was nearing the party's nomination, the emails cast doubt on the DNC's neutrality towards progressive and moderate candidates. This was evidenced by alleged bias in the scheduling and conduct of the debates, (Note: As far back as 2015, the sharp reduction of the debate schedule, as well as the days and times, had been criticized by multiple rivals as biased in Clinton's favor. The DNC denied bias, claiming to be cracking down on the non-sanctioned debates that proliferated in recent cycles, while leaving the number of officially sanctioned debates the same as in 2004 and 2008. Donna Brazile, who succeeded Debbie Wasserman Schultz as DNC chair after the first batch of leaks, was shown in the emails leaking primary debate questions to the Clinton campaign before the debates were held, although a senior aide to Sanders came to Brazile's defense and tried to downplay the issue.) as well as controversial DNC–Clinton agreements regarding financial arrangements and control over policy and hiring decisions. (Note: Brazile went on to write a book about the primary and what she called "unethical" behavior in which the DNC (after its debt from 2012 was resolved by the Clinton campaign) gave the Clinton campaign control over hirings and press releases, and allegedly helped it circumvent campaign finance regulation. Several Democratic leaders responded that the joint-fundraising agreement was standard, was for the purpose of the general election, and was also offered to the Sanders campaign. Another agreement that came to light gave the Clinton campaign powers over the DNC well before the primary was decided. Some media commentators noted that the Clinton campaign's level of influence on staffing decisions was indeed unusual and could have ultimately influenced factors such as the debate schedule.) Other media commentators have disputed the significance of the emails, arguing that the DNC's internal preference for Clinton was not historically unusual and didn't affect the primary enough to sway the outcome. The controversies ultimately led to the formation of a DNC "unity" commission to recommend reforms in the party's primary process.

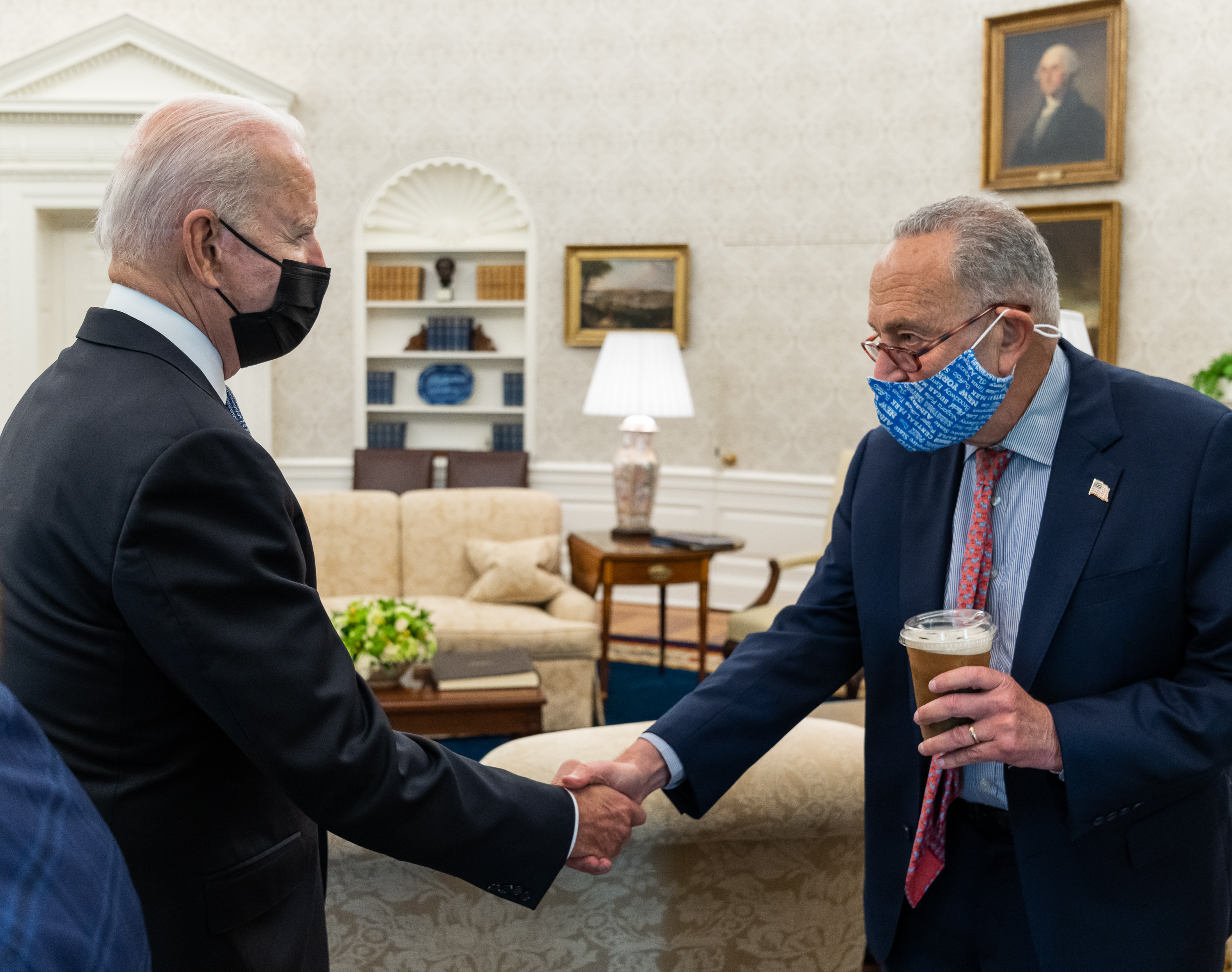
Joe Biden and Chuck Schumer in 2021

==== Presidency of Joe Biden ====
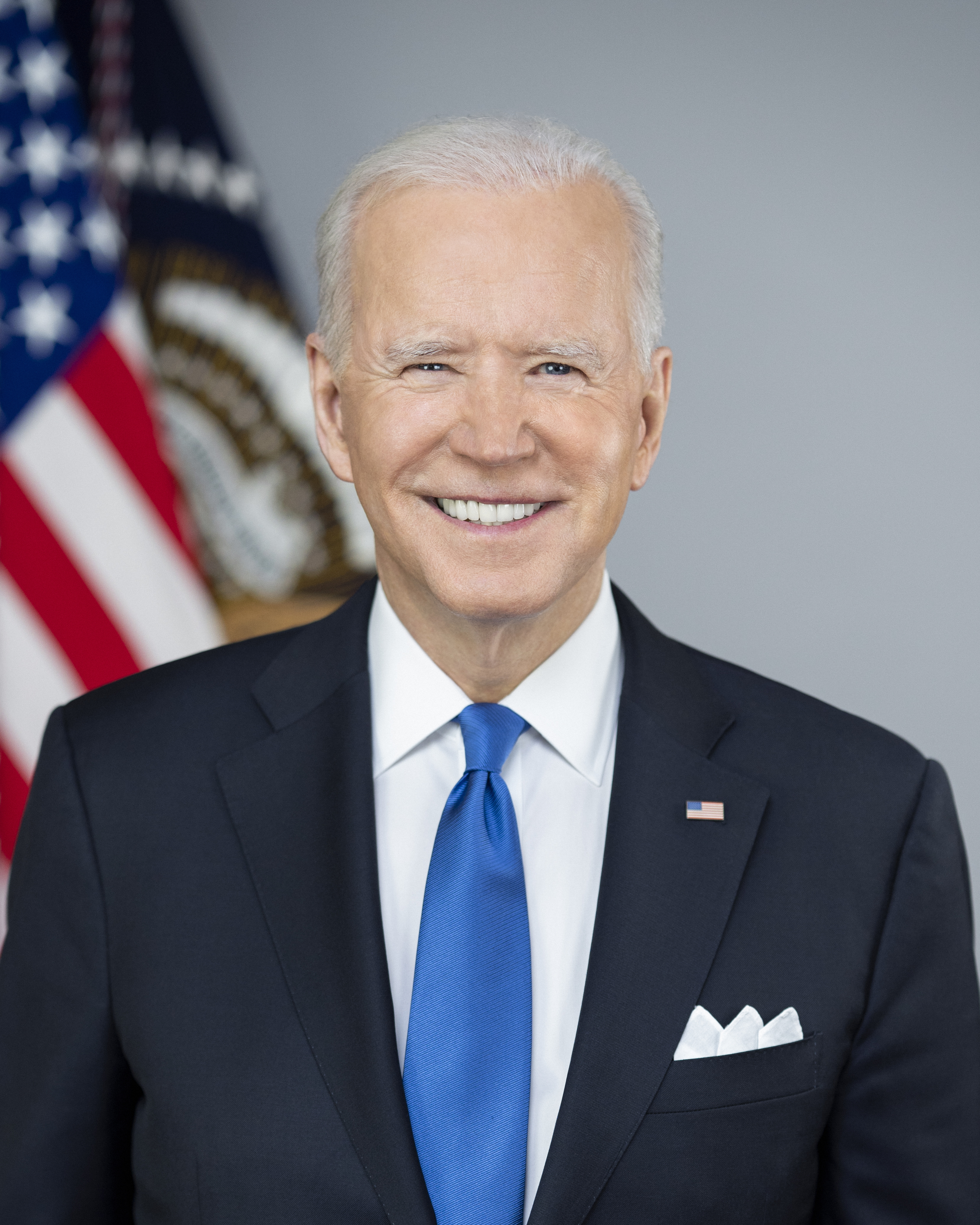
Joe Biden, the 46th president (2021–2025)

The winner of the 2020 United States presidential election was Joe Biden, who served as vice president under Barack Obama. Although Biden has not explicitly self-identified as a New Democrat, Biden identifies as a moderate Democrat and opposes some progressive positions. During his presidency, Biden has broken with New Democrat policies on some issues, such as spending and free trade. In the 2020 United States House of Representatives elections, 13 Democrats lost their seats. All thirteen Democrats that lost their seats had won in the 2018 mid-term elections. Of those 13 members, 10 of them were New Democrats. During the 117th United States Congress, the New Democrat Coalition lost its status as the largest ideological coalition in favor of the more left leaning Congressional Progressive Caucus. The CPC was founded in 1991 but only began catching up and eventually surpassed the New Democrat Coalition in the 2010s.

The 2022 Russian invasion of Ukraine has been characterized by some as the end of the post-Cold War era and liberal internationalism. Clinton was elected in 1992 shortly after the dissolution of the Soviet Union, when New Democrats were at the peak of their influence. As of December 2023, Biden has largely maintained Trump's protectionist trade policies, and has not negotiated any new free trade agreements. Labor unions, an important constituency for Biden's re-election, opposed removing Trump's tariffs. The PPI pressured the Biden Administration to revoke Obama's "dead" position and join the TPP. Instead, the Biden Executive Office negotiated and initiated the Indo-Pacific Economic Framework (IPEF). The 2024 United States presidential election, as well as partisan dissent in participating member-states, forestalled further implementation and ratification of the IPEF. Biden withdrew from the presidential election on July 21, 2024.

==== 2020s ====
Proportion of Americans with a bachelor's degree or higher in each U.S. state, the District of Columbia, and Puerto Rico as of the 2021 American Community Survey

The defeat of Kamala Harris in the 2024 United States presidential election prompted a variety of responses from think tanks and political journals. William Galston of the Brookings Institution, for example, argued that "by refusing to explain why she had abandoned the progressive positions on crime, immigration, health care, and climate change, she blurred the public's perception of her", while opening "the door to the Trump campaign's charge that she was a closet radical."

Politico argued that Democratic Party candidates who did not chiefly focus on Trump resistance politics ultimately ran successful campaigns. After the elections, New Democrats further "urged the party to de-emphasize cultural issues", especially "transgender policies."

According to a post-election New York Times and Ipsos poll (2025), 94% of Republican respondents and 67% of Democratic respondents opposed transgender athletes in women's sports. Lori Trahan, a New Democrat Caucus member, told the New York Times that policymakers across the partisan aisle had raised "legitimate concerns" over limits to transgender rights in the United States, but criticized these Republicans for "injecting themselves into the issue."

Conor Lamb advised Democratic Party candidates to instead elucidate their fiscal platforms for voters without college degrees, including those who faced barriers to universal access to education for students. On the other hand, according to New York Times estimates, Trump made "larger gains among Black, Hispanic, Asian American and young voters", irrespective of college degrees, than he did among "white voters without a college degree."

A majority of American adults over the age of 25 do not possess college degrees. Democratic Party support among white voters with college degrees has led to geographic concentration, limiting electoral competitiveness in regions with lower educational attainment. Of the jurisdictions won by Kamala Harris in 2024, all but New Mexico—a plurality-Hispanic state—exhibited above-average levels of educational attainment.

In the area of foreign policy, Irie Senter, writing for Politico in January 2025, observed that the pro-Palestine movement tended to concentrate its political advocacy on the executive branch, viewing Democratic administrations as more amenable to adjusting U.S. policy toward Israel. Senter noted that while support for Israel remains broadly bipartisan, Republican politicians have been more vocal in their criticisms of the pro-Palestinian movement.

The PPI persists into the present day, sponsoring "young pragmatists" at the rechristened Center for New Liberalism, formerly known as the Neoliberal Project, to "modernize progressive politics." Colin Mortimer, who helped establish "New Liberalism", attempted to succinctly summarize the platform: "...in many ways, the new wave of neoliberals that have emerged recently resemble the original founders of neoliberalism more than the thinkers of free-market reforms in the late 20th century do. Modern neoliberals seek to marry the market with a role for government, though the degree to which is up for debate across the neoliberal spectrum." Mortimer identifies the "original founders of neoliberalism" as participants in the Colloque Walter Lippmann, with debates at the Center paralleling divisions at the 1938 colloqium.

In July 2025, the Majority Democrats PAC-SuperPAC was founded, consisting of a supermajority of NDC members and disaffected former CPC members who seek, in part, to sustain Clintonism "personal responsibility." The chair of this hybrid political action committee, Jake Auchincloss, is not currently affiliated with the NDC. A month later, Jerusalem Demsas founded The Argument, featuring columnists and contributors who advanced effective altruism, venture philanthropy (Kelsey Piper), the politics of abundance, and a "post-neoliberalism." The magazine chief of staff, Kate Crawford, edits blog essays by her husband and The Argument contributor Matthew Yglesias. Elements of neo-Keynesianism and market monetarism, Yglesias contends, can maintain free markets without the scarcity endengered by "restricting the freedom of voluntary market transactions" and "regulatory policy" over finance and consumption. ICIJ journalist Jacob Silverman determined that the Pritzker family and the Niskanen Center, among others, were "backers" of the magazine. Additional "moderate Democrat" organizations, including the Searchlight Institute, were similarly established in the aftermath of the 2024 elections.

Dylan Gyauch Lewis, writing for The American Prospect, had earlier renounced these movements as "neoliberalism rebranded", pointing to interviews where later columnists for The Argument expressed preferences for the NDC over the CPC. A minority of contributors explicitly opposed the floating signifier "neoliberalism", even while maintaining a trenchant criticism of forecasted CPC aims as well as the actions of what they refer to as Bernie Bros. Political analyst Ron Brownstein likened the situation to the "Clinton era", while Barack Obama recommended studies on the politics of abundance for summer 2025 reading.

A number of political commentators and journalists have attempted to navigate between those who dismissed these Democrats as rebranded neoliberals, and pundits who considered them a threat to the NDC. Additional commentators likened the contingent to 1970s "New Liberals", a defunct designation for the Watergate Babies and their reframing of "supply-side."

== Ideology ==
The "second wave of neoliberalism" had "roots...firmly planted in Ronald Reagan's neoliberal" policies and previous academic scholarship. Harbingers of the "second wave" revived and reconfigured the ideas of their "predecessors...[into] market globalism. Identifying themselves with a politically moderate position known as the Third Way, US President Bill Clinton and British Prime Minister Tony Blair embraced this neoliberal ideology" as a new variant of centrism. The Third Way is considered a core shift in the history of modern liberalism in the United States.

According to Dylan Loewe, New Democrats tend to identify as fiscally moderate-to-conservative and socially liberal. Columnist Michael Lind argued that neoliberalism for New Democrats was the "highest stage" of left liberalism. The counterculture youth of the 1960s became more fiscally conservative in the 1970s and 1980s but retained their cultural liberalism. Many leading New Democrats, including Bill Clinton, and Gary Hart, started out in the George McGovern wing of the Democratic Party and gradually moved toward the right on economic and military policy. According to historian Walter Scheidel, both major political parties shifted towards promoting free-market capitalism in the 1970s, with Republicans moving further to the political right than Democrats to the political left. He noted that Democrats played a significant role in the financial deregulation of the 1990s. Gerstle and anthropologist Jason Hickel contended that the neoliberal policies of the Reagan era were carried forward by the Clinton Administration, forming a new economic consensus which crossed party lines. According to Gerstle, "across his two terms, Clinton may have done more to free markets from regulation than even Reagan himself had done."

Historian Michael Kazin argues that New Democrat fiscal and monetary ideas marked a divergence from U.S. fiscal variants of Keynesian public spending. Keynesian economics aimed to stimulate individual and group consumption of goods and services in a given economic sector, until monetary circulation crossed a predetermined sector threshold for contraction in economic liberalism. This U.S. iteration of Keynesianism, coupled with budget deficits, began during the latter half of the Second New Deal and became a hallmark of early Cold War liberalism. In contrast, Clinton's "the era of big government is over" marked a more global shift to a new neoclassical synthesis, culminating in the post-war displacement of Keynesianism with creative destruction and various approaches to the service-commodity goods continuum in a post-industrial economy.

New Democrat monetary ideas aligned with easy money policy and the Greenspan put from the Reagan Administration, resulting in Clinton's reappointment of Alan Greenspan as Chair of the Federal Reserve. For "moral capitalism", Kazin favored U.S interpretations of New Keynesian economics in Progressive Caucus platforms, albeit with a more diversified consumer base. Five weeks after the 2024 elections, CPC chair-elect Greg Casar dated "serious discontent" with the Democratic Party to both New Democrat and neoconservative government policies and the subprime mortgage crisis, as well as to fiscal grievances by Occupy Wall Street and Black Lives Matter.

For a select group within the NDC, the 2008–2009 Keynesian resurgence as well as Barack Obama's 2010 endorsement of the Volcker Rule, evinced a trend away from this shift and concomitant tax brackets. During the COVID-19 pandemic and everything bubble, fiscal and monetary stimuli, as well as targeting in monetary policy to curb inflation, came under public and scholarly scrutiny. Debates focused on whether pandemic policymaking should be regarded solely as "COVID-Keynesianism", with more flexibility in deficit spending, or an advancement in the connected, yet distinct, trend. The latter would add a sustained expansion of Financial regulatory authority to address any adverse effects of windfall profits, substantial price gouging, and artificial scarcity on the US economy. The 2021–2023 inflation surge has called into question the efficacy of increased federal spending and deficits.

=== Criticism ===
New Democrats have faced criticism from progressives and liberals further to their left, as well as the broader American Left. In a 2017 BBC News interview, Noam Chomsky said that "the Democrats gave up on the working class forty years ago". In the aftermath of his 2020 presidential campaign, Bernie Sanders stated that "the Democratic Party has become a party of the coastal elites, folks who have a lot of money, upper-middle-class people". Political analyst Thomas Frank asserted that the Democratic Party began to represent the interests of the professional class rather than the working class.

The Democratic Leadership Council, the organization that produced such figures as Bill Clinton, Al Gore, Joe Lieberman and Terry McAuliffe, has long been pushing the party to forget blue-collar voters and concentrate instead on recruiting affluent, white-collar professionals who are liberal on social issues. The larger interests that the DLC wants desperately to court are corporations, capable of generating campaign contributions far outweighing anything raised by organized labor. The way to collect the votes and – more important – the money of these coveted constituencies, "New Democrats" think, is to stand rock-solid on, say, the pro-choice position while making endless concessions on economic issues, on welfare, NAFTA, Social Security, labor law, privatization, deregulation and the rest of it.

— Thomas Frank, What's the Matter with Kansas? (2004), p. 243

Critics of "neoliberal" political economy additionally targeted elements of "creative destruction", especially those perceived as contributing to post-industrial monopolies. Beginning in 1992, economists Philippe Aghion and Peter Howitt (and then Joel Mokyr) argued that nominal rigidity or "sticky wages" did not always warrant Keynesian monetary stimulation during economic downturns. They even questioned previous interpretations of John Maynard Keynes as solely blaming "sticky wages" for perpetuating recessions. Crucially, this model reduced the role of Keynesian (temporary) public spending to remedy involuntary unemployment. The model, however, simultaneously promoted antitrust policies to curb the "rents" (profits crossing a monopolization threshold) produced by the so-called "business-stealing effects" in revolutions of "creative destruction." Endogenous growth continued due to innovative reconfigurations of goods and services "stolen" from previous firms. Antitrust policymaking, firm investments, and limited government subsidies for research, education, and development fueled an innovation economy that, in turn, sustained growth and revolutions.

Intellectual property played a role in research and development, albeit a constrained one, and not at the expense of "business-stealing" and "creative destruction." The economists added that free trade partnerships produced spillover effects. These effects, while previously maligned as "neoliberal", pushed multinational businesses into contending with foreign regulatory apparatuses. All three economists were not involved in the Clinton Administration, although all three engaged in collaborations and debates with New Democrat economic advisors. Howitt in particular shifted to entertaining elements of Alan Greenspan's discretionary policy for monetary concerns if ad hoc policies facilitated "creative destruction." The "business-stealing effects" underpinned this iteration of "creative destruction", as it did most such variants. The effects similarly undermined rationale for more domestic tax policies and regulatory efforts. At the same time, a certain degree of financial regulations and taxes were pivotal in sustaining growth. As of 2025, the model has not found its way into partisan planks for U.S. political economy.

In Listen, Liberal: Or, What Ever Happened to the Party of the People? (2016), Frank was one of the few analysts who foresaw that Donald Trump could win the 2016 U.S. presidential election, attributing it to New Democrats alienating working class voters. Nate Cohn of The New York Times stated that Trump had made larger gains with racial minority voters than with white voters without college degrees compared to the 2012 U.S. presidential election, with the Democratic Party's gains being mainly just among white voters with college degrees. Democrats also lost further ground with white voters without college degrees, costing them crucial Rust Belt states in the 2024 elections. Journalist Michael Cuenco further argues that the Democratic Party lost a substantial amount of "minorities" without college degrees:

Consider that when Obama last ran, the Midwest was still known as an impenetrable Blue Wall, while Florida and Ohio were still purple states. When Bill Clinton gave his acceptance speech in 1996, the Democrats were competitive throughout large swathes of the South. During that period, they had gone on to win not just Clinton's Arkansas and Al Gore's Tennessee, but states such as Kentucky and Louisiana too. The story of the last three decades has been one of political success for Democrats, who have won the popular vote in seven out of the last eight elections. Yet it is also one of narrowing political constituencies and pyrrhic victories, as the party attracted college-educated professionals at the expense of the non-college-educated majority. In particular, non-college-educated whites were lost, but in recent years they have increasingly been joined by significant numbers of non-college-educated minorities.

After the 2024 elections, The Nation editor D. D. Guttenplan noted that Kamala Harris had been "cozily campaigning with the Cheneys", which alienated "as least as many potential voters as it attracted." Likewise, John Nichols observed both Bernie Sanders and Shawn Fain, despite outward appearances, desperately attempting to persuade the Harris campaign "to return to the economic populism—and clear appeal to working-class voters—they had embraced in Chicago (only to abandon it in favor of attacks on Trump's character once the big donors weighed in)."

== Elected to public office ==
=== Presidents ===
1. Bill Clinton (former)
2. Barack Obama (former)
3. Joe Biden (former)

=== Vice presidents ===
1. Al Gore (former)
2. Joe Biden (former)
3. Kamala Harris (former)

=== Senate ===
1. Evan Bayh (former)
2. Mark Begich (former)
3. Jacky Rosen
4. Jeanne Shaheen
5. Maria Cantwell
6. Tom Carper
7. Bob Casey Jr. (former)
8. Max Cleland (former)
9. Hillary Clinton (former)
10. Kent Conrad (former)
11. Chris Coons
12. Joe Donnelly (former)
13. Byron Dorgan (former)
14. Al Gore (former)
15. Maggie Hassan
16. Heidi Heitkamp (former)
17. John Hickenlooper
18. Tim Johnson (former)
19. Doug Jones (former)
20. John Edwards (former)
21. Ted Kaufman (former)
22. Amy Klobuchar
23. Mary Landrieu (former)
24. Claire McCaskill (former)
25. Bill Nelson (former)
26. Barack Obama (former)
27. Mark Pryor (former)
28. Ken Salazar (former)
29. Debbie Stabenow (former)
30. Jon Tester (former)
31. Mark Warner
32. Tim Kaine
33. Patty Murray
34. Catherine Cortez Masto
35. Ben Ray Luján
36. Richard Blumenthal
37. Elissa Slotkin

=== House of Representatives ===
1. Pete Aguilar
2. Colin Allred (former)
3. Jason Altmire(former)
4. Brad Ashford (former)
5. Cindy Axne(former)
6. Ami Bera
7. Don Beyer
8. Lisa Blunt Rochester (former)
9. Brendan Boyle
10. Anthony Brindisi (former)
11. Anthony Brown (former)
12. Shontel Brown
13. Julia Brownley
14. Cheri Bustos(former)
15. Lois Capps (former)
16. Salud Carbajal
17. Tony Cardenas(former)
18. André Carson
19. Troy Carter
20. Sean Casten
21. Joaquin Castro
22. Gerry Connolly(former)
23. Jim Cooper(former)
24. Lou Correa
25. Jim Costa
26. Joe Courtney
27. Angie Craig
28. Charlie Crist(former)
29. Jason Crow
30. Joe Crowley(former)
31. Henry Cuellar
32. Sharice Davids
33. Susan Davis (former)
34. Madeleine Dean
35. John Delaney (former)
36. Suzan DelBene
37. Val Demings(former)
38. Eliot L. Engel (former)
39. Veronica Escobar
40. Elizabeth Esty (former)
41. Lizzie Fletcher
42. Bill Foster
43. Vicente Gonzalez
44. Josh Gottheimer
45. Gwen Graham (former)
46. Josh Harder
47. Denny Heck (former)
48. Jim Himes
49. Steven Horsford
50. Chrissy Houlahan
51. Sara Jacobs
52. Bill Keating
53. Derek Kilmer(former)
54. Ron Kind(former)
55. Ann Kirkpatrick(former)
56. Raja Krishnamoorthi
57. Ann McLane Kuster(former)
58. Rick Larsen
59. Brenda Lawrence(former)
60. Al Lawson(former)
61. Susie Lee
62. Elaine Luria(former)
63. Tom Malinowski(former)
64. Sean Patrick Maloney (former)
65. Kathy Manning(former)
66. Lucy McBath
67. Gregory Meeks
68. Joe Morelle
69. Seth Moulton
70. Patrick Murphy(former)
71. Donald Norcross
72. Beto O'Rourke (former)
73. Jimmy Panetta
74. Chris Pappas
75. Scott Peters
76. Ed Perlmutter(former)
77. Dean Phillips(former)
78. Pedro Pierluisi (former)
79. Mike Quigley
80. Kathleen Rice(former)
81. Laura Richardson(former)
82. Cedric Richmond (former)
83. Deborah K. Ross
84. Raul Ruiz
85. Loretta Sanchez (former)
86. Adam Schiff (former)
87. Brad Schneider
88. Kurt Schrader(former)
89. David Scott(former)
90. Kim Schrier
91. Debbie Wasserman Schultz
92. Terri Sewell
93. Mikie Sherrill (former)
94. Elissa Slotkin (former)
95. Adam Smith
96. Darren Soto
97. Greg Stanton
98. Haley Stevens
99. Marilyn Strickland
100. Norma Torres
101. Lori Trahan
102. David Trone(former)
103. Juan Vargas
104. Marc Veasey
105. Filemon Vela Jr. (former)
106. Jennifer Wexton(former)
107. Susan Wild(former)
108. Nikema Williams

=== Governors ===
1. Andy Beshear
2. Laura Kelly
3. Ned Lamont
4. Jared Polis
5. Mikie Sherrill
6. Josh Shapiro
7. Abigail Spanberger
8. Josh Stein
9. Gavin Newsom
10. Gretchen Whitmer

==== Former governors ====
1. Evan Bayh (former)
2. Mike Beebe (former)
3. Phil Bredesen (former)
4. Steve Bullock (former)
5. John Carney (former)
6. Tom Carper (former)
7. Roy Cooper (former)
8. Jim Doyle (former)
9. Mike Easley (former)
10. Dave Freudenthal (former)
11. Christine Gregoire (former)
12. Maggie Hassan (former)
13. Brad Henry (former)
14. John Hickenlooper (former)
15. Ted Kulongoski (former)
16. Terry McAuliffe (former)
17. Ronnie Musgrove (former)
18. Janet Napolitano (former)
19. Gina Raimondo (former)
20. Brian Schweitzer (former)
21. Kathleen Sebelius (former)
22. Earl Ray Tomblin (former)

== See also ==
- Blue Grit
- Labor Right
- New Labour
- New Democrat Coalition
- Problem Solvers Caucus
- Radical centrism
- Rockefeller Republican
