= Robert J. Shapiro =

American economist

Robert J. Shapiro (born 1953) is the cofounder and chairman of Sonecon, LLC, a United States private consultancy for economic and security-related issues that has built a reputation on a range of policy matters, including climate change, intellectual property, securities fraud, healthcare reform, demographics, the resilience of the electric grid to cyberattacks, and blockchain technologies. He is known for advising public officials, including President Bill Clinton, UK Prime Minister Tony Blair, senior members of the Obama cabinet and administration, numerous US senators and representatives, and the Director of the International Monetary Fund. He also has advised senior executives of numerous Fortune 100 companies.

He holds a Ph.D. from Harvard University, a M.Sc. from the London School of Economics and Political Science, and an A.B. from the University of Chicago. He also has been a Fellow of the National Bureau of Economic Research, the Brookings Institution, and Harvard University.

== Professional career ==
Previously he was undersecretary of commerce for economic affairs in the administration of President Bill Clinton, principal economic adviser to Bill Clinton during the 1992 campaign, a senior economic adviser to Hillary Clinton, Barack Obama, John Kerry and Al Gore in their campaigns, a cofounder of the Progressive Policy Institute, legislative director to Senator Daniel Patrick Moynihan, and an associate editor of U.S. News & World Report.

In his Commerce Department position, he oversaw the major statistical agencies of the United States, including the Census Bureau while it carried out the 2000 decennial census.

Shapiro currently serves as a Director of the blockchain investment fund Medici Venture Fund, Policy Fellow at the McDonough School of Business at Georgetown University, and a member of the advisory boards to biotech company Gilead Sciences and the investment firm Cote Capital. Previously, he was also the Director of the Globalization Initiative of New Democrat Network, a political organization, chair of the Climate Task Force, co-chairman of the American Task Force Argentina, and a director of the Ax:son-Johnson Foundation.
