= Democratic Leadership Council =

Defunct centrist organization within the US Democratic Party

The Democratic Leadership Council (DLC) was a centrist non-profit 501(c)(4) corporation that was active from 1985 to 2011. Founded and directed by Al From, it argued that the United States Democratic Party should shift away from the leftward turn it had taken since the late 1960s. One of its main purposes was to win back white middle-class voters with ideas that addressed their concerns. The DLC hailed the election and reelection of Bill Clinton as proof of the viability of Third Way politicians and as a DLC success story.

The DLC's affiliated think tank was the Progressive Policy Institute. Democrats who adhered to the DLC's philosophy often called themselves "New Democrats." This term is also used by other groups who hold similar views, including the New Democrat Network and Third Way.

On February 7, 2011, Politico reported that the DLC would dissolve. On July 5 of that year, DLC founder Al From announced in a statement on the organization's website that the historical records of the DLC had been purchased by the Clinton Foundation. The DLC's last chairman was Representative Harold Ford of Tennessee, and its vice chair was Senator Tom Carper of Delaware. Its CEO was Bruce Reed.

According to Bill Curry, an advisor to Bill Clinton, "the whole point of [the DLC] was to exterminate the progressives".

== Founding and early history ==
The DLC was founded by Al From in 1985 in the wake of Democratic candidate and former vice president Walter Mondale's landslide defeat by incumbent president Ronald Reagan in the 1984 presidential election. Other founders included Democratic Senator Joe Biden (Delaware), Democratic Governors Bill Clinton (Arkansas), Chuck Robb (Virginia), Bruce Babbitt (Arizona) and Lawton Chiles (Florida), Senator Sam Nunn (Georgia) and Representative Dick Gephardt (Missouri).

The model on which the Democratic Leadership Council was built was the Coalition for a Democratic Majority. Founded by "Scoop" Jackson Democrats in response to George McGovern's massive loss to Richard Nixon in 1972, the CDM was dismayed by two presidential election losses and the organization's goal was to steer the party away from the New Left influence that had permeated the Democratic party since the late 1960s and back to the policies that made the FDR coalition electorally successful for close to 40 years. Although Senator Jackson declined to endorse the organization, believing the timing was inappropriate, future DLC founders and early members were involved, such as Senators Sam Nunn and Charles S. Robb.

In the early 1980s, some of the youngest members of Congress at the time, including Representative William Gray of Pennsylvania, Tim Wirth of Colorado, Al Gore of Tennessee, Richard Gephardt of Missouri, and Gillis Long of Louisiana, helped found the House Democratic Caucus' Committee on Party Effectiveness. Formed by Long and his allies after the 1980 presidential election, the CPE hoped to become the main vehicle for the rejuvenation of the Democratic Party. The CPE has been called "the first organizational embodiment of the New Democrats."

The DLC started as a group of forty-three elected officials and two staffers, Al From and Will Marshall, and shared their predecessor's goal of reclaiming the Democratic Party from the left's influence prevalent since the late 1960s. Their original focus was to secure the 1988 presidential nomination of a southern conservative Democrat such as Nunn or Robb. After the success of Jesse Jackson, a vocal critic of the DLC, in winning a number of southern states in 1988's "Super Tuesday" primary, the group began to shift its focus towards influencing public debate. In 1989, Marshall founded the Progressive Policy Institute, a think tank which has since turned out policy blueprints for the DLC. Its most extensive series of papers is the series of New Economy Policy Reports.

== Positions ==
The DLC stated that it "seeks to define and galvanize popular support for a new public philosophy built on progressive ideals, mainstream values, and innovative, non-bureaucratic, market-based solutions." It supported welfare reform, including the Personal Responsibility and Work Opportunity Act of 1996, President Clinton's expansion of the Earned Income Tax Credit, and the creation of AmeriCorps.

In 2004, columnist David Sirota strongly criticized the DLC as having sold out to corporate interests. Sirota's article "The Democrats' Da Vinci Code" argued that progressive politicians are more successful.

In 2006, the DLC urged Senate Democrats to vote against Bush's nomination of Samuel Alito to the U.S. Supreme Court but opposed any filibuster of the nominee. Ultimately, a filibuster attempt by John Kerry to block the nomination would fail, and 42 of the 46 Senate Democrats at the time voted against his confirmation.

== Electoral and political success ==
During its existence, progressive critics argued the DLC's centrism led the Democratic party to multiple electoral defeats. While DLC candidates, office holders, and their moderate policies were generally favored by the American electorate during their existence. When the Democratic party won a majority status in the Senate in 1986, multiple centrist and DLC affiliated candidates Barbara Mikulski (a participant in the DLC's National Service Tour), Harry Reid (who once said Democrats have to "swallow their pride" and move toward the middle), Conservative Democrat Richard Shelby, DLCer Bob Graham, DLCer Kent Conrad, and DLCer Tom Daschle won their election When Bill Clinton, former chairman of the DLC, made up his mind to run for the presidency in 1992, the DLC spotted the right candidate to promote its mission. Bill Clinton ran his 1992 and 1996 campaigns as a New Democrat and (prior to Obama's 2012 presidential re-election) became the only twice elected Democratic president since President Franklin D. Roosevelt (though only one other Democratic president in the years after FDR, Jimmy Carter, was ever a candidate for a second term). New Democrats made significant gains in both the 2006 midterms and the 2008 elections. While explicitly denying any direct connection to the DLC in 2003, in May 2009 President Obama reportedly declared to the House New Democrat Coalition, "I am a New Democrat."

Some political analysts like Kenneth Baer contend the DLC embodies the spirit of Truman-Kennedy era Democrats and were vital to the Democratic party's resurgence after the election losses of liberals George McGovern, Walter Mondale, and Michael Dukakis. Simon Rosenberg, a long time Democratic campaign operative and strategist, said, "there is a strong argument to be made that the DLC has been the most influential think tank in American politics over the past generation ... the DLC helped set in motion a period of party modernization that has helped the Democratic Party overcome the potent and ultimately ruinous rise of the New Right."

== 2004 presidential primary ==
In May 2003, as the Democratic primary of the 2004 presidential campaign was starting to pick up, the organization voiced concern that the Democratic contenders might be taking positions too far left of the mainstream general electorate. Early front-runner Howard Dean, who attracted popular support due in large part to his anti-war views despite his reputation as a centrist governor of Vermont, was specifically criticized by DLC founder and CEO Al From.

Senator John Kerry won the Democratic primary and chose primary contender Senator John Edwards as his running mate. Both were members of the Senate New Democrat Coalition.

== 2008 presidential primary ==
The 2008 Democratic primary pitted New York Senator Hillary Clinton, a prominent DLC member, against Illinois Senator Barack Obama, who had previously stated that his positions on NAFTA, the Iraq War and universal health care made him "an unlikely candidate for membership in the DLC." However, President Obama surrounded himself with DLC members, appointing Clinton herself as Secretary of State. In May 2009, President Obama reportedly declared to the House New Democrat Coalition, the congressional arm of the DLC, "I am a New Democrat." President Obama has also called himself a progressive and has been endorsed by Howard Dean's progressive political action committee Democracy for America.

== Chairs ==
- Rep. Dick Gephardt of Missouri (1985–1986) (House Minority Leader 1995–2003)
- Fmr. Gov. Chuck Robb of Virginia (1986–1988) (Senator 1989–2001)
- Sen. Sam Nunn of Georgia (1988–1990)
- Gov. Bill Clinton of Arkansas (1990–1991) (President 1993–2001)
- Sen. John Breaux of Louisiana (1991–1993)
- Rep. Dave McCurdy of Oklahoma (1993–1995)
- Sen. Joe Lieberman of Connecticut (1995–2001) (2000 Democratic vice-presidential nominee)
- Sen. Evan Bayh of Indiana (2001–2005)
- Gov. Tom Vilsack of Iowa (2005–2007)
- Fmr. Rep. Harold Ford Jr. of Tennessee (2007–2011)

(Titles listed are those held at time of assuming chair.)

== Republican equivalent ==
On the Republican side of the aisle another centrist organization was founded by moderate and some left of center Republicans with the same purpose for the Republican Party. The Republican Leadership Council was founded by former New Jersey Governor Christine Todd Whitman and former U.S. Senator and Episcopal priest John Danforth.

== See also ==
- New Democrat Network
- New Democrat Coalition
- New Democrats
