= Center for New Liberalism =

Public policy/political organization

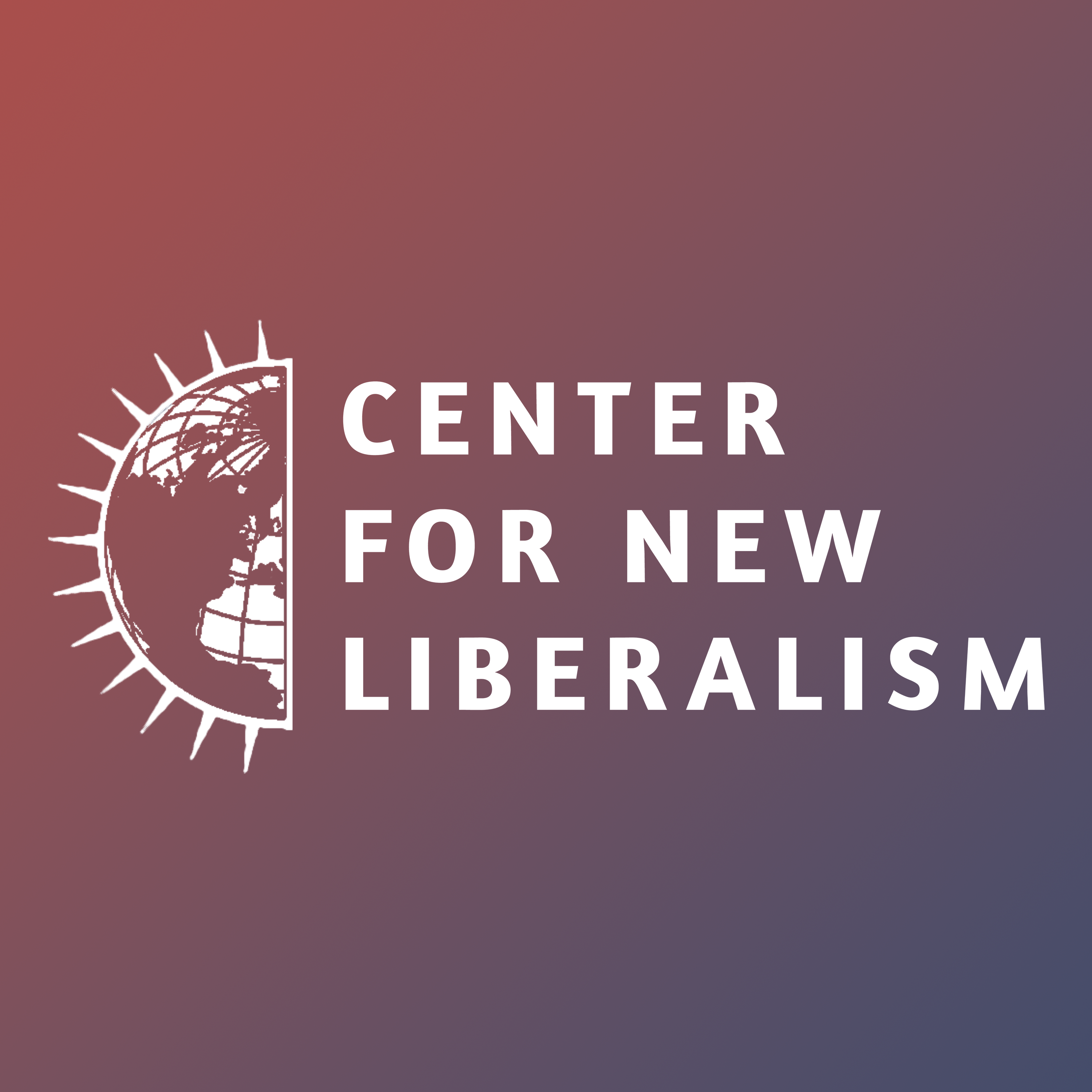
- Abbreviation: CNL
- Formation: February 2017; 9 years ago
- Type: 501(c)(4)
- Headquarters: Washington, DC
- Director: Colin Mortimer
- Co-Founders: Colin Mortimer; Jeremiah Johnson; Matthew Parlmer
- Parent organization: New Democracy
- Affiliations: IFLRY
- Website: https://cnliberalism.org/

The Center for New Liberalism is a non-profit, 501(c)(4), grassroots organization that advocates for liberal and center-left policy internationally. As of August 2026, CNL lists 47 chapters in the United States, and 67 total across the world. It is headquartered in Washington, DC.

== History ==
The earliest iteration of the Center for New Liberalism began when a number of users took over the r/neoliberal subreddit and pivoted its focus to center-left policy and politics in February 2017.

In 2018, three of its leaders, Colin Mortimer, Jeremiah Johnson and Matthew Parlmer, consolidated the community's activities under the Neoliberal Project moniker. That year, the organization launched its podcast and began its first in-person chapter meetups.

In February 2020, the Neoliberal Project joined the Progressive Policy Institute (PPI), becoming a PPI initiative. PPI's founder Will Marshall described the move as filling "a vacuum in our politics for a pragmatically liberal alternative to right-wing populism and democratic socialism."

In September 2022, the Neoliberal Project officially rebranded as the Center for New Liberalism reflecting a desire to not "be distracted by arguments over nomenclature" and after many of its chapters had opted to rebrand on their own. Shortly after, its podcast rebranded to become The New Liberal Podcast and changed its social media usernames.

In June 2023, CNL transitioned from a 501(c)(3) to a 501(c)(4) by joining PPI's sister organization, New Democracy, in order to engage directly in elections and endorse candidates for office.

In June 2026, CNL joined The International Federation of Liberal Youth as an Observer member at the 58th general assembly in Taiwan.

== Ideology and activities ==
The Center for New Liberalism's self-stated ideology combines market liberalism with social liberal values. According to The Washington Post, CNL's members are "enthusiastic about deregulation to achieve progressive goals", while also favoring a robust social safety net. The Columbia Journalism Review characterizes CNL as "a political group aiming to provide a home for Zoomer, Gen Z, and millennial voters who feel alienated by the Democratic Party's progressive tilt", positioning itself as a cultural and ideological alternative within the American center-left.

=== New Liberal Action Summit (NLAS) ===
Since 2022, the New Liberal Action Summit (NLAS) is CNL's annual gathering in Washington, D.C. that brings together its members for policy discussions, skill-building workshops on messaging and organizing, coalition-building, and Congressional office visits. Notable past speakers have included Governor Jared Polis; U.S. Senators John Hickenlooper and Michael Bennet; Representatives Jeff Jackson, Don Beyer, Nikki Budzinski, Scott Peters, Val Hoyle, Brad Schneider, Jake Auchincloss, Josh Harder, Brittany Pettersen, and Marilyn Strickland, as well as former Senator Doug Jones and political scientist Francis Fukuyama.

=== New Liberal Podcast ===
The Center for New Liberalism produces The New Liberal Podcast, a weekly interview program focused on public policy, economics, and politics, which has surpassed one million downloads. Notable guests have included Rep. Ritchie Torres, political scientist Francis Fukuyama, New York Times columnist Ezra Klein, and Jason Furman, former Chair of the Council of Economic Advisers, along with public figures such as Dr. Ashish Jha, former White House COVID-19 Response Coordinator.

=== Neoliberal Shill Bracket ===
The Neoliberal Shill Bracket is an annual Twitter-style competition organized by CNL in which followers vote in successive polls to name a "Chief Neoliberal Shill". The annual contest was borne out of a misunderstanding of a request to create a March Madness bracket pool for the community's members. Past winners have included journalists Noah Smith, Matthew Yglesias, Maia Mindel and Joey Politano; Cato Institute Vice President Scott Lincicome, Twitch streamer Bastiat, and economist Matthew Darling.

== Reception and influence ==
Media coverage has portrayed the CNL as a distinctive hybrid of internet meme culture and policy wonk politics. The Washington Post described the group as "fighters in the meme trenches", attempting to make center-left moderation "trendy again" among younger voters. The Columbia Journalism Review similarly characterized CNL as a space for Gen Z and millennial liberals who feel alienated by both the Democratic Party's left flank and traditional think tank culture, noting its "ironic but earnest" embrace of the neoliberal label.

Some have criticized the organization's strategic approach and ideological positioning. The Washington Post noted skepticism about the group's rebrand from "Neoliberal Project" to "Center for New Liberalism", suggesting it softened the term without resolving the underlying ideological baggage associated with neoliberalism.

Critics have argued that corporate funding has shaped its policy positions, particularly on technology issues. Reporting by The American Prospect and MapLight noted that PPI received funding from Google, Facebook, and Amazon while taking positions that aligned with those companies’ interests. IRS filings also show that New Democracy reported paying Will Marshall $1,085,908 in compensation in 2024.
