= Post-industrial economy =

Nation moved from manufacturing to service

A post-industrial economy is a period of growth within an industrialized economy or nation in which the relative importance of manufacturing reduces and that of services, information, and research grows.

Such economies are often marked by a declining manufacturing sector, resulting in deindustrialization, and a large service sector as well as an increase in the amount of information technology, often leading to an "Information Age"; information, knowledge, and creativity are the new raw materials of such an economy. The industry aspect of a post-industrial economy is sent into less developed nations which manufacture what is needed at lower costs through outsourcing. This occurrence is typical of nations that industrialized in the past such as the United Kingdom (first industrialised nation), most of Western Europe and the United States.

== See also ==
- Post-industrial society
- Tertiary sector
