= New Democrat Network =

American think tank

- Chairperson: Simon Rosenberg
- Founded: 1996; 30 years ago
- Dissolved: March 2024; 2 years ago
- Ideology: Modern liberalism Third Way
- Political position: Center
- National affiliation: Democratic Party
- Colors: Blue

Website
- ndn.org

The New Democrat Network (NDN) was an American think tank that promoted centrist candidates for the Democratic Party. NDN was a 501(c)(4) membership organization that functioned in collaboration with two subsidiary organizations, the NDN Political Fund, a non-federal political organization (527), and NDN PAC, a federal political action committee. The organization was dissolved by Rosenberg in March 2024.

The group was officially named the New Democrat Network from 1996 to 2004 and NDN from 2004 to 2024.

== Founding ==
NDN was led and founded by Simon Rosenberg in 1996, after his split with the Democratic Leadership Council (DLC), for which he worked.

Before founding NDN, Rosenberg worked as a television news writer and producer and a political strategist for the Michael Dukakis and Bill Clinton presidential campaigns and the Democratic National Committee. NDN has offices in Washington, D.C., New York City, San Francisco, and Miami.

In 2000, the NDN was characterized as "a group of pro-business Capitol Hill Democrats who borrow freely from the metaphors and values of the New Economy in their quest to modernize their party and wean it away from the labor unions and old-line liberals." Simon described the group as "a venture capital fund for the Democratic Party."

== Involvement in the 2004 presidential election ==
The NDN, while not supporting or embracing 2004 Democratic presidential primary candidate Howard Dean, pointed to his online network of small donors, volunteers, and bloggers as the model to emulate for the Democratic Party. In 2003, the NDN was described as challenging the DLC and becoming an increasingly influential player in the party's politics.

In the 2004 United States presidential election, NDN led an effort to turn out Hispanic voters for John Kerry. Also in 2004, Rosenberg announced his candidacy for Chairman of the Democratic National Committee, but eventually withdrew from the race after it became clear that he would lose to eventual Chairman Howard Dean. Rosenberg then supported Dean's campaign.

== See also ==
- New Democrat Coalition
- New Democrats (United States)
- Third Way (United States)
