= Progressive Policy Institute =

Centrist American think tank

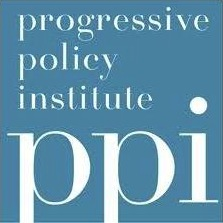
- Abbreviation: PPI
- Formation: 1989
- Type: Public policy think tank
- Location: Washington, D.C., 20005
- President and CEO: Will Marshall
- Website: www.progressivepolicy.org

The Progressive Policy Institute (PPI) is a non-profit 501(c)(3) organization that serves as a public policy think tank in the United States. The Democratic Leadership Council (DLC) founded it in 1989. The think tank has been described as a centrist Democratic institution.

== History ==
The Progressive Policy Institute was founded in 1989 by the Democratic Leadership Council (DLC) as a vehicle for developing new policy ideas for centrist Democrats. During the 1990s, the institute became closely associated with the "New Democrat" movement and contributed to policy debates on trade, welfare reform, and globalization. In 2020, the Neoliberal Project joined PPI as the Center for New Liberalism, which later became the organization's rebranded identity in 2022.

== Key people ==
Its president is Will Marshall, who writes on foreign policy, defense, national service, globalization, trade policy, and cultural issues. The organization's executive director is Lindsay Lewis. Its chief economic strategist is Michael Mandel, who writes on innovation, growth, and the reduction of what he described as "regulatory accumulation". Several former leading government officials have held senior positions or affiliations with the organization, including William Galston, Austan Goolsbee, Elaine Kamarck, Bruce Reed, Andrew Rotherham, Robert J. Shapiro, Paul Weinstein, and Ed Gresser.

== Center for New Liberalism ==
In February 2020, the Center for New Liberalism (CNL) (formerly known as the Neoliberal Project) joined as a new initiative of the Progressive Policy Institute. Their network comprises over eighty chapters across the world. The national organization produces a podcast, conference, and livestreamed events. The organization also runs a satirical annual competition to select the "Shill" of the year. In September 2022, the organization full rebranded itself under the "Center for New Liberalism." Since joining PPI, CNL has held events with Senator John Hickenlooper, Governor Jared Polis and were guests at the White House during the Biden administration.

== Policy focus ==
PPI has emphasized centrist and market-friendly approaches to economic and social policy. Its chief economic strategist Michael Mandel has argued for regulatory reform to reduce what he calls “regulatory accumulation.” The institute has also published work on innovation policy, globalization, trade, foreign affairs, and national service. Former affiliated scholars such as William Galston, Austan Goolsbee, and Elaine Kamarck have contributed to debates on welfare reform, education, and democratic governance.

== See also ==
- Policy Network
- Third Way (United States)
