= Will Marshall =

American political adviser

Will Marshall (born 1952) is an American public policy analyst and think tank executive. He is one of the founders of the New Democrat movement. Since its founding in 1989, he has been president of the Progressive Policy Institute, a think tank formerly affiliated with the Democratic Leadership Council (DLC). He also serves as honorary vice president of Policy Network, and previously served on the board of the National Endowment for Democracy and the District of Columbia Public Charter School Board.

He served on the board of the Committee for the Liberation of Iraq, an organization formed in late 2002 to build support for the invasion of Iraq. At the outset of the war, Marshall was among the signatories to the Project for the New American Century (PNAC) statement supporting the invasion and post-war reconstruction, and of a similar letter sent to President George W. Bush organized by Social Democrats USA (SDUSA) on February 25, 2003. The SDUSA letter urged Bush to commit to "maintaining substantial U.S. military forces in Iraq for as long as may be required to ensure a stable, representative regime is in place and functioning."

Marshall wrote the "Politics of Ideas" column in Blueprint, the DLC's magazine. He is one of the co-authors of Progressive Internationalism: A Democratic National Security Strategy (2003).

In 1985, Marshall helped found the Democratic Leadership Council, serving as its first policy director.

Prior to the founding of PPI, Marshall was variously a speechwriter for Lieutenant Governor Dick Davis of Virginia, Governor Jim Hunt of North Carolina and Representative Gillis Long of Louisiana.

Marshall holds a B.A. in English and History from the University of Virginia.
