= Third Way in Germany =

Centrist political movement

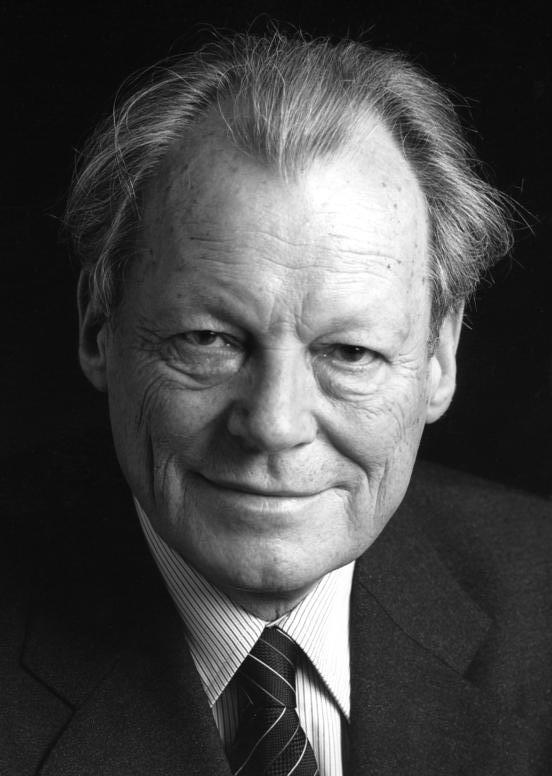
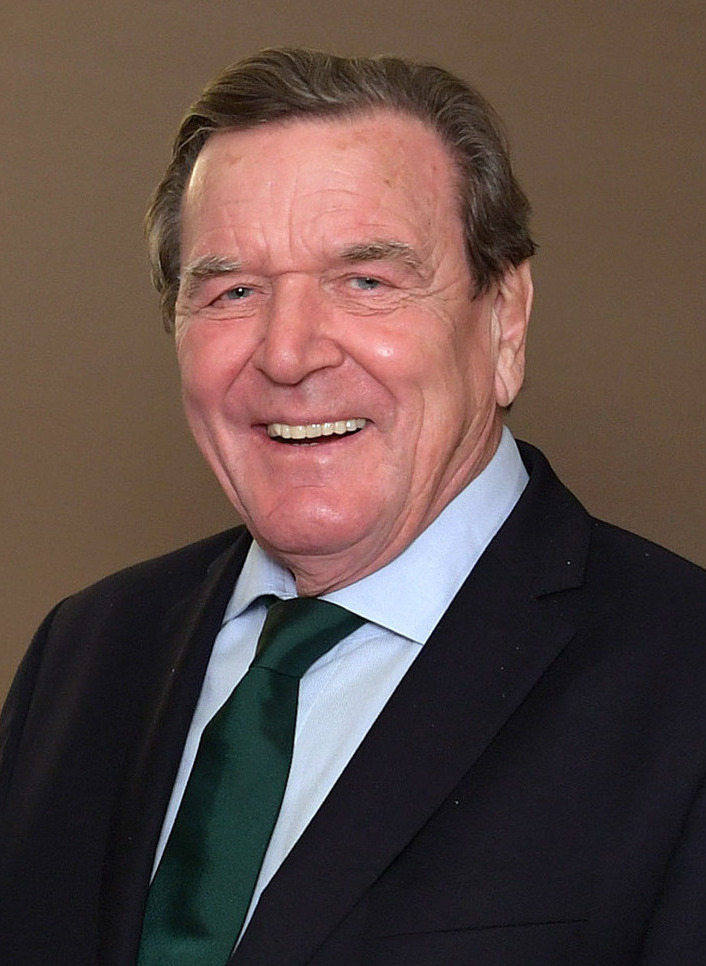
(from left to right, top to bottom) Konrad Adenauer, Willy Brandt and Gerhard Schröder were affiliated with the Third Way movement in Germany.

Third Way in Germany is a political doctrine that has been influential in German politics mostly during the chancellorship of Gerhard Schröder. While most of modern German history has been influenced by centre-left and centre-right ideologies and politicians, there have been times outside that chancellorship when Third Way politics have influenced the country.

== Background ==
During World War II, economists tried to find a third way between capitalism and socialism. The results were social market economy and ordoliberalism.

=== Social market economy ===
Alfred Müller-Armack, who coined the term "social market economy", used the term "Third Way" to describe the social market economy; for him, the social market economy was neither libertarian nor socialist. Unlike Ludwig Erhard, he promoted social liberalism, and rejected the term "Third Way" and also social democracy. Alfred Schüller also rejected the term "Third Way". Franz Oppenheimer, a friend of Erhard, described the social market economy as liberal and socialist, and later published Weder so – noch so. Der dritte Weg (1933) ("Neither that way nor that way. The third way") in which he described the social market economy as a Third Way.

==== Konrad Adenauer Foundation on the social market economy ====
The Konrad Adenauer Foundation described the social market economy as a Third Way.

=== Ordoliberalism ===
The Freiburg school embraced the social market economy and developed their own variant of liberal economic thought called "ordoliberalism" by Hero Moeller in 1950. In Civitas Humana (1947), ordoliberal Wilhelm Röpke saw ordoliberalism as liberal conservatism against capitalism. While not part of the Freiburg school, Alexander Rüstow influenced ordoliberalism and wrote in Das Versagen des Wirtschaftsliberalismus (1950) ("The breakdown of economic liberalism") that economic liberalism had failed. Rüstow had previously also written a book entitled "Zwischen Kapitalismus und Kommunismus" ("Between capitalism and communism"). Ordoliberalism supports the configuration of vital resources and progressive taxation. The ordoliberal emphasis on the privatization of public services and other public companies such as telecommunication services, and wealth redistribution and minimum wage laws, as regulative principles makes clear the links between this economic model and the social market economy. Philipp Ther defined ordoliberalism as the "combination of neoliberalism with a welfare state" and the combination of "promarket liberalism with a regulatory welfare state".

While ordoliberalism is often compared to Third Way social democracy, they differ. Both adhere to the idea of a moderate stance between socialism and capitalism; the ordoliberal social market model often combines private enterprise with government regulation to establish fair competition (although German network industries are known to have been deregulated), whereas advocates of the Third Way social democracy model have been known to oversee multiple economic deregulations. The Third Way social democracy model has also foreseen a clash of ideas regarding the establishment of the welfare state, in comparison to the ordoliberal's idea of a social market model being open to the benefits of social welfare. Despite this, it is still often seen as a third way between collectivism and classical liberalism. Ordoliberalism represents the German form of social liberalism. Ordoliberals advocated for their own variant of supply-side economics; ordoliberals also embrace monetarism. Röpke later described ordoliberalism as the "First Way". Other ordoliberals continued to see it as a "Third Way", including Alexander Rüstow. The non-Third Way Erhard is also considered by some as ordoliberal, because he integrated ordoliberal ideas into the concept of a social market economy. Erhard was rather inclined to Walter Eucken's ordoliberal competitive market order, though. Although he even considered himself an ordoliberal later, Erhard perceived Röpke's books as works of revelation, and considered him a brother in spirit. On 17 August 1948, Erhard referred to Müller-Armack, who greatly impressed him, most of all not as a theorist but as one who wanted to transfer theory into practice. The FDP 1977 Kiel Theses and 1985 Liberal Manifesto returned the FDP towards its traditional free-market, ordoliberal approach, even while former chairmen were more proponents of social liberalism or only of the social market economy.

While the ordoliberals had close contact with Carl Friedrich Goerdeler, who was a proponent of laissez-faire capitalism, ordoliberalism rejects laissez-faire economics. Besides, Goerdeler is regarded as a forerunner of the social market economy due to his contact with various ordoliberals; however the social market economy also rejects laissez-faire economics.

Later economists like Roland Baader were influenced by ordoliberalism; however he saw himself more as a classical liberal.

==== Ordoliberalism and the term Neoliberalism ====
The ordoliberal Alexander Rüstow used the term neoliberalism to describe ordoliberalism: this was one reason why ordoliberalism was often later referred to as "German neoliberalism"; however this led to frequent confusion and mix-ups of terms and ideas in the discourse, as the term was then applied to Friedrich August von Hayek and to Milton Friedman and his economic school, the Chicago School of economics, which is against state intervention. Thus debate and criticism of both economic schools accured. In 1991 political economist Michel Albert published Capitalisme Contre Capitalisme, and in 2001 Peter A. Hall and David Soskice published Varieties of Capitalism, and both separated the concepts and developed the new terms "liberal market economy" and "coordinated market economy" to distinguish neoliberalism and ordoliberalism.

In the early 2000s both Wilhelm Röpke and Walter Eucken were seen as embracing something called "Soziologischer Neoliberalismus" or "Soziologischer Liberalismus" or also as "Religiös/Humanistisch begründeter Neoliberalismus". The non-ordoliberal Hans-Dietrich Genscher favoured a classical neoliberalism but with social aspects.

Some people see Friedrich August von Hayek as an ordoliberal, but this was criticized because Hayek was not against classical liberalism: he even saw himself as a classical liberal, and considered that Hayek did not want to find a "Third Way", as ordoliberals do.

==== German and American think tanks on ordoliberalism ====
The Konrad Adenauer Foundation and the Friedrich Naumann Foundation both see ordoliberalism as Third Way. The Konrad Adenauer Foundation also criticized former South Korean president Kim Young-sam for embracing neoliberalism rather than ordoliberalism. The right-libertarian Foundation for Economic Education links ordoliberalism to Bill Clinton's Third Way.

== History ==
=== 1949–1963 ===
At the beginning of the Federal Republic of Germany, the term was not used; however, Konrad Adenauer, the first Federal Chancellor, saw himself as a supporter of the Third Way, as he rejected Western liberalism and Soviet Communism. Franz Josef Strauss, the Minister-President of Bavaria from 1978 until 1988, also embraced the Third Way.

=== 1969–1974 ===
The first SPD chancellor of Germany, Willy Brandt, is considered to be a supporter of the Third Way by Konrad Sziedat, who argued that like Gerhard Schröder and Tony Blair he was for a third way between capitalism and socialism. Brandt saw himself as a democratic socialist.

=== 1982–1983 ===
During his first cabinet, Helmut Kohl advocated for ordoliberal economic policies and reforms; however, he later supported Keynesian economic policies mixed with neoliberal ones. At the time when he was the chancellor candidate for the CDU in 1983, he was influenced by Ludwig Erhard and also by Alfred Müller-Armack. Otto Graf Lambsdorff, Federal Economic Minister at that time, was an ordoliberal, which also embraced market liberalism.

=== 1998–2005 ===
Gerhard Schröder is the best known German to have embraced the Third Way. He called his variant "Neue Mitte" ("new centre") and later wrote, together with Blair, a paper about the Third Way, which is referred to by three different names: Schröder-Blair-Papier, Der Weg nach vorne für Europas Sozialdemokraten ("The way forward for Europe's Social Democrats") and Europe: The Third Way/Die Neue Mitte. They called on Europe's centre-left governments to cut taxes, pursue labour and welfare reforms, and encourage entrepreneurship. The joint paper said European governments needed to adopt a "supply-side agenda" to respond to globalisation, the demands of capital markets, and technological change. Schröder portrayed himself as a pragmatic new social democrat. Schröder advocated for the economic ideas of Otto Graf Lambsdorff. The Seeheimer Kreis supported Schröder's policies.

==== Domestic policies ====
His Agenda 2010 reform programme included cuts in the social welfare system (national health insurance, unemployment payments, and pensions), lower taxes, and reformed regulations on employment and payment. He also eliminated capital gains tax on the sale of corporate stocks and thereby made the country more attractive to foreign investors.

=== 2020s ===
Sahra Wagenknecht sees ordoliberalism as an alternative to neoliberalism. Some Alternative for Germany (AfD) members like Dimitrios Kisoudis and Jurij.C. Kofner are embracing ordoliberalism. The AfD member Markus Frohnmaier is for economic liberalism with social welfare but only for Germans; he calls this concept "Volkskapitalismus" ("People's capitalism"). The term "Volkskapitalismus" had already been used by Ludwig Erhard and Willy Brandt.

== Notable figures ==
- Alfred Müller-Armack
- Franz Oppenheimer
- Alexander Rüstow
- Wilhelm Röpke (early)
- Konrad Adenauer
- Franz Josef Strauss
- Willy Brandt
- Otto Graf Lambsdorff
- Helmut Kohl (early)
- Gerhard Schröder
- Marja-Liisa Völlers
- Claudia Moll
- Esra Limbacher
- Dirk Wiese
- Uwe Schmidt

== See also ==
- Blairism
- Blatcherism
- Brownism
- Chavismo
- Clintonism
- Compassionate conservatism
- Craxism
- Erdoğanism
- Lulism
- New Labour
- One Nation Labour
- Thaksinomics
- Third Way in Brazil
- Third Way in the United States
- Colloque Walter Lippmann
