= Third Way in the United States =

American political movement

Since the mid-20th century, the United States has had various politicians, including presidents, affiliated with the Third Way.

== History ==
=== Before Clinton ===
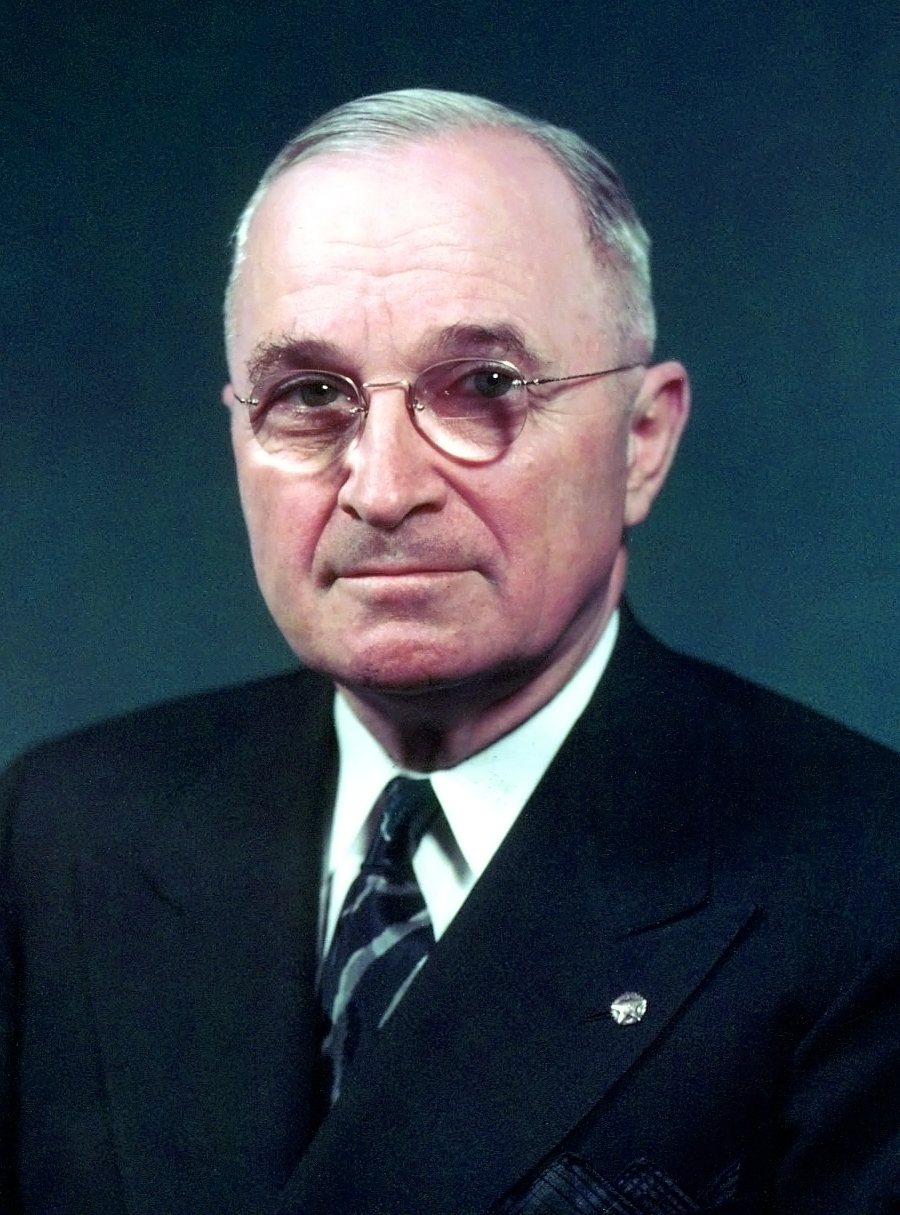
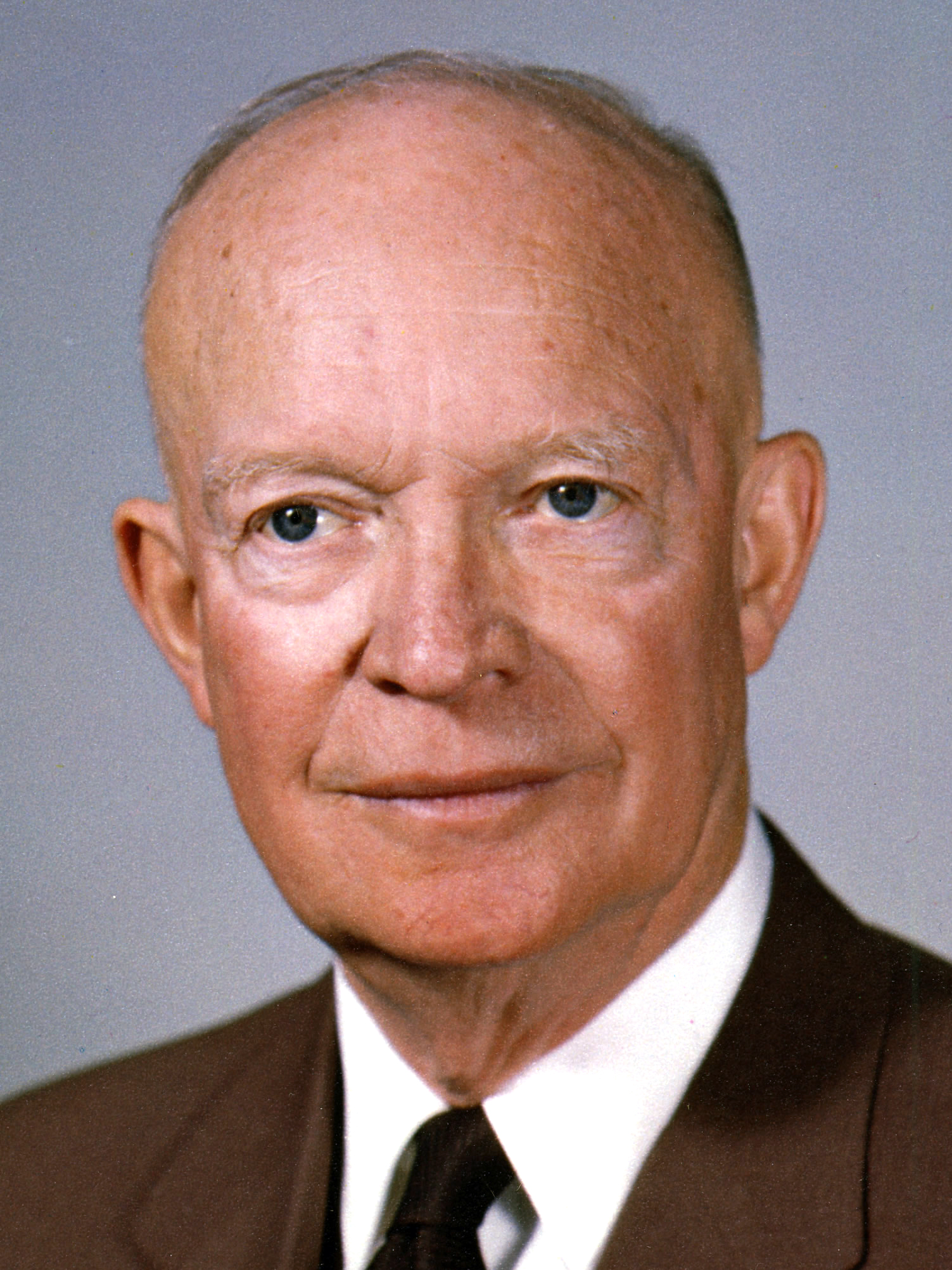
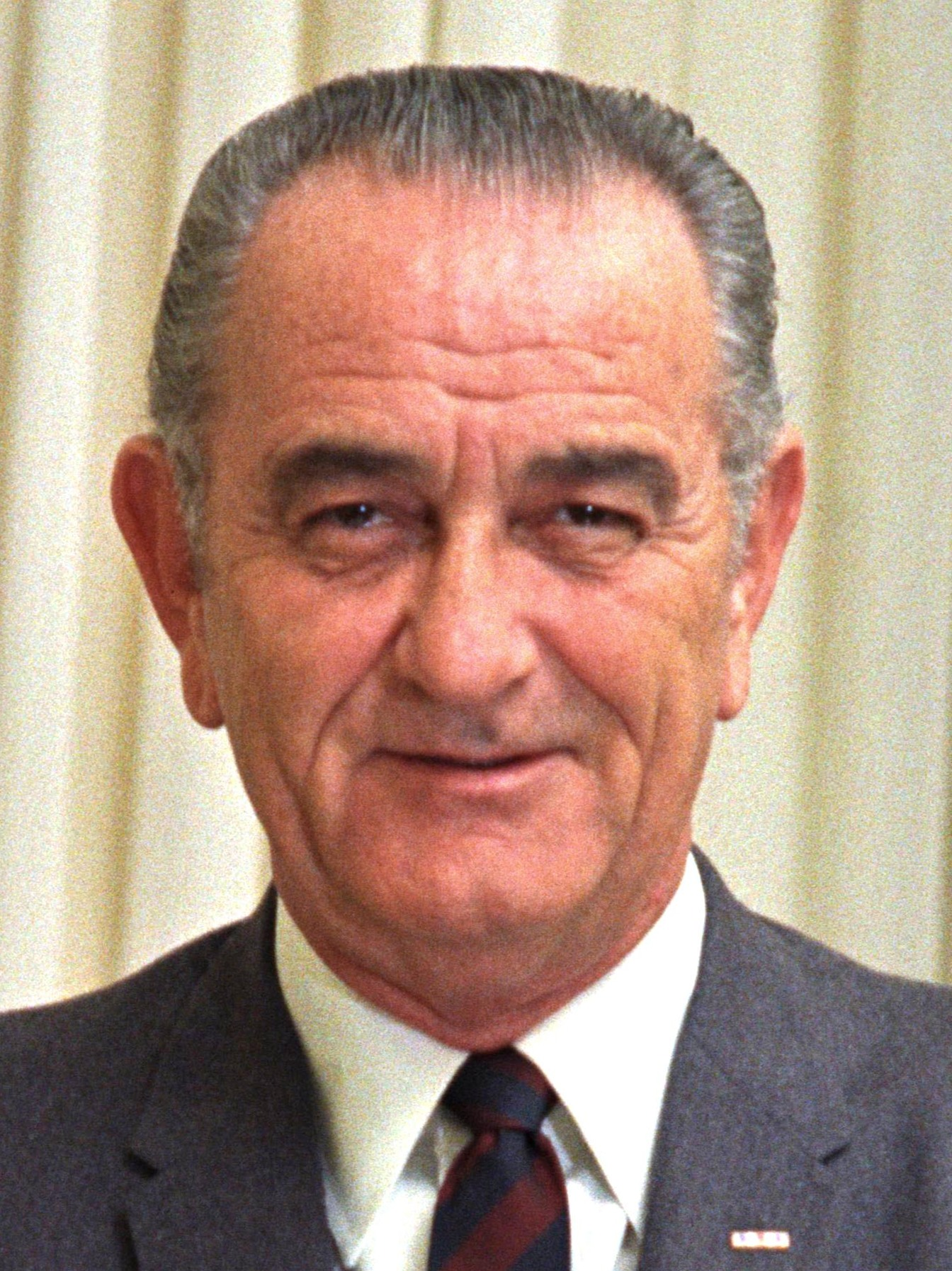
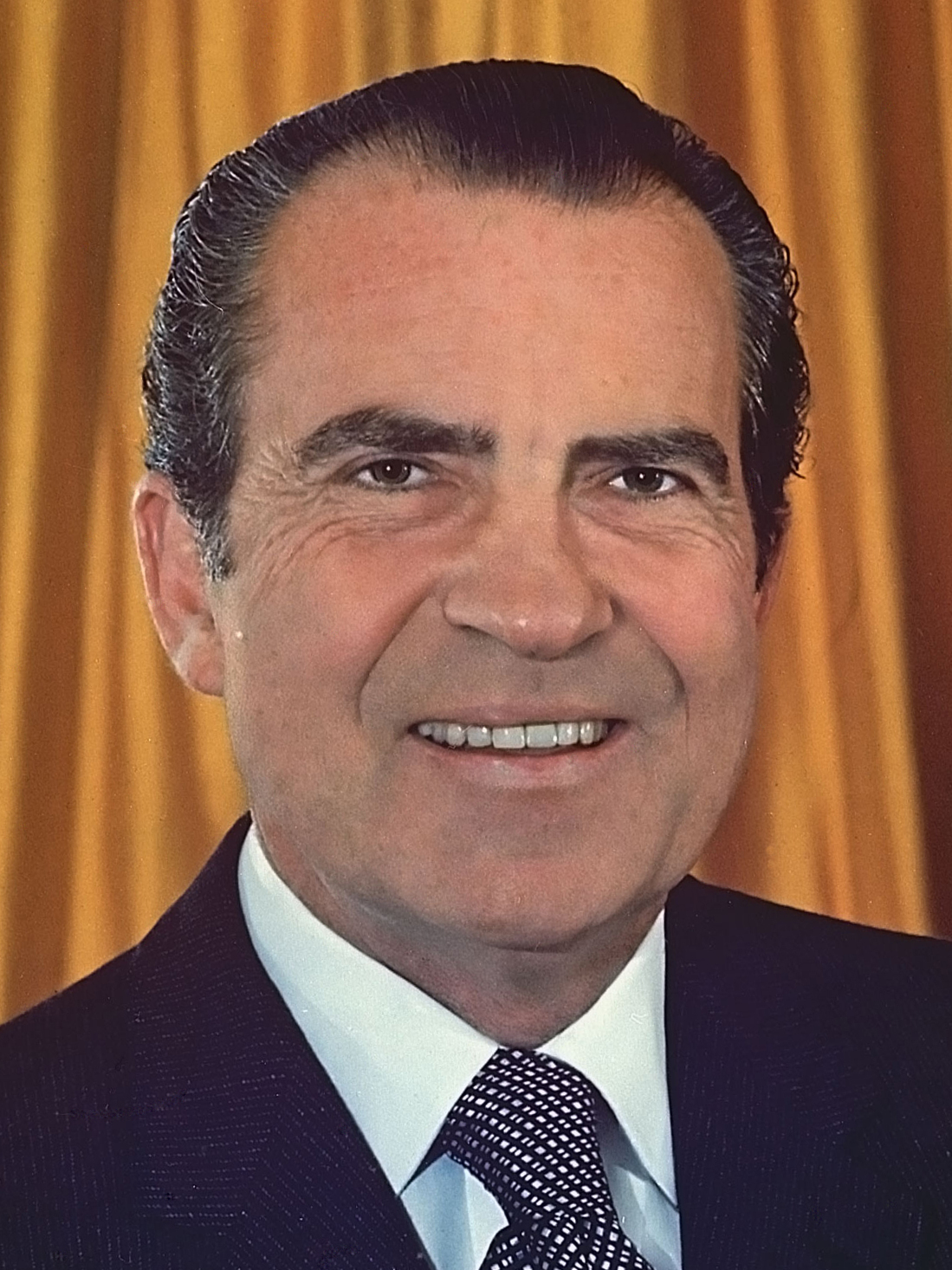
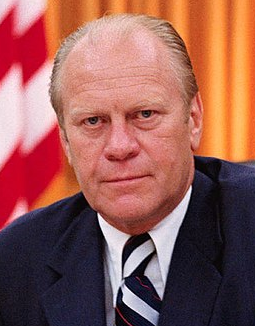
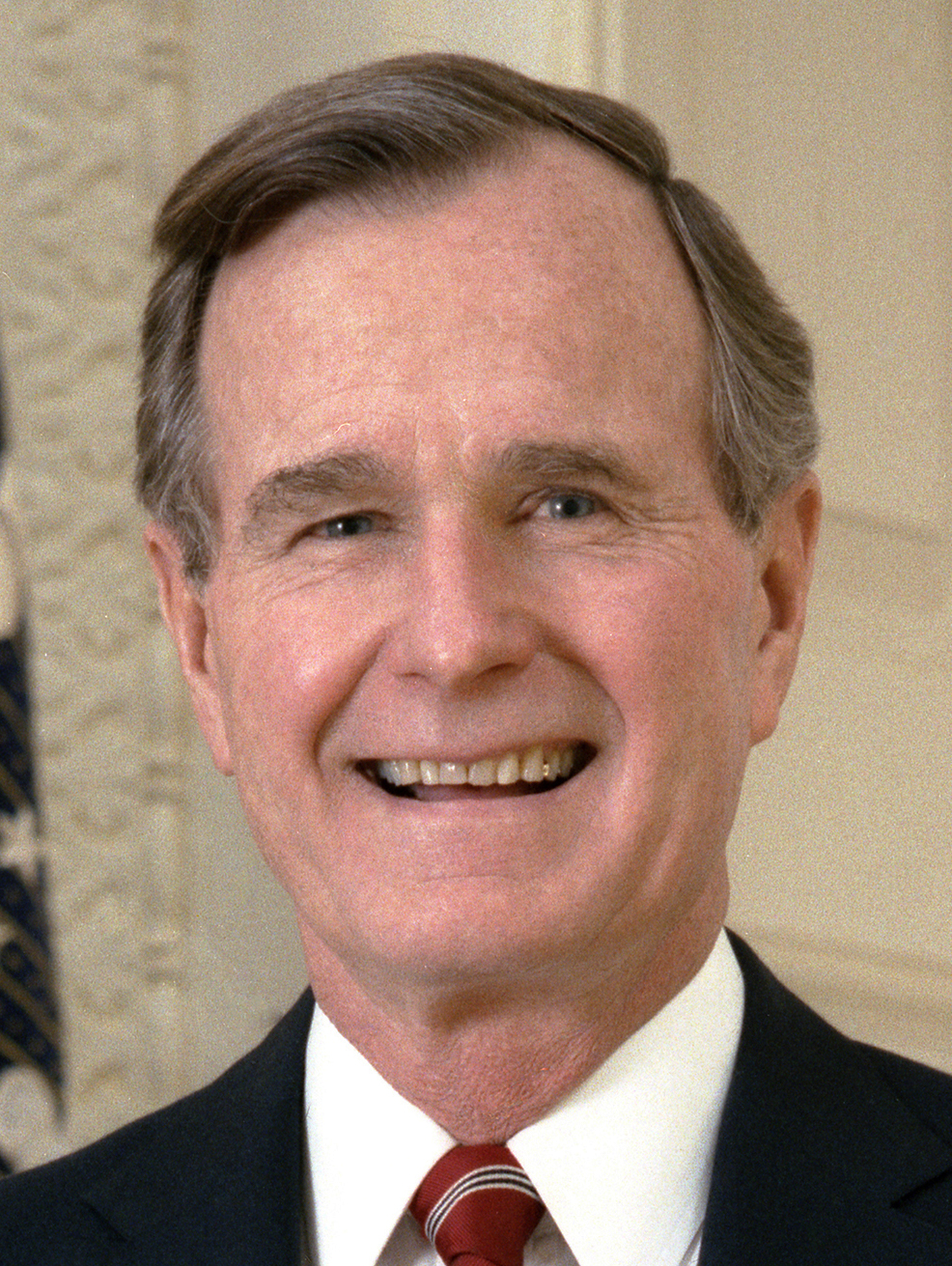
(from left to right, top to bottom) Truman, Eisenhower, Johnson, Nixon, Ford, Carter and Bush are considered to be part of the Third Way, before Clinton's Presidency.

==== First appearance during Harry S. Truman ====
While Harry S. Truman never used the term "Third Way", the third way proponent Will Marshall argues that Truman embraced a kind of Third Way.

==== Eisenhower's philosophy ====
The Third Way movement in the United States started with Dwight D. Eisenhower in 1953. Eisenhower himself was for a philosophy which he called "Middle Way", rejecting both the right-wing and left-wing. Eisenhower was a supporter of free enterprises and limited government but also New Deal policies, which put him at odds with most people in the Republican Party except for the Rockefeller Republican faction.

==== 1963–1974 ====
Richard Allen Posner described both Lyndon B. Johnson and Richard Nixon as advocates of third way politics, arguing that their economics were identical to those of Bill Clinton and Barack Obama. Johnson's Great Society was seen as similar to the "Activist Government" of John Quincy Adams, but unlike Johnson, Adams is not seen as a third way proponent. Richard Nixon was like Eisenhower for New Deal policies.

==== Gerald Ford and compassionate conservatism ====
During his presidency, Gerald Ford didn't see himself as a compassionate conservative. However, in 2001, he claimed he was the first compassionate conservative.

==== Third Way and Jimmy Carter ====
Jimmy Carter described himself in a press conference as "middle-of-the-road". This was before he became president, when he was Governor of Georgia. For his time as president only Jack Knott and Aaron Wildavsky described Carter as a "third way" president, however they didn't explained why he was one, which could be explained that the term "third way" after Tony Blair and other didn't was used then for former leaders like later for Johnson and Nixon, this would mean that Carter wasn't a third way advocater in the sense of Tony Blair. In terms of economics, Carter mixed left (keynesianism) and right (fiscal conservatism and neoliberalism) economics.

==== George H. W. Bush's views and policies ====
The former president George H. W. Bush's moderate brand of conservatism which is compassionate conservatism is described as similar to Clintonism. Both support a market economy but still advocate for state interventionism in the economy; in the case of Bush it was the government involvement in the education sector. Additionally, compassionate conservatism mixes both right and left economics and because of this is considered as the Republican brand of the Third Way. Bush also rejected supply-side economics; for example, Reaganomics was described by him as Voodoo economics, but he also advocated for some neoliberal economic policies.

=== Clinton administration ===
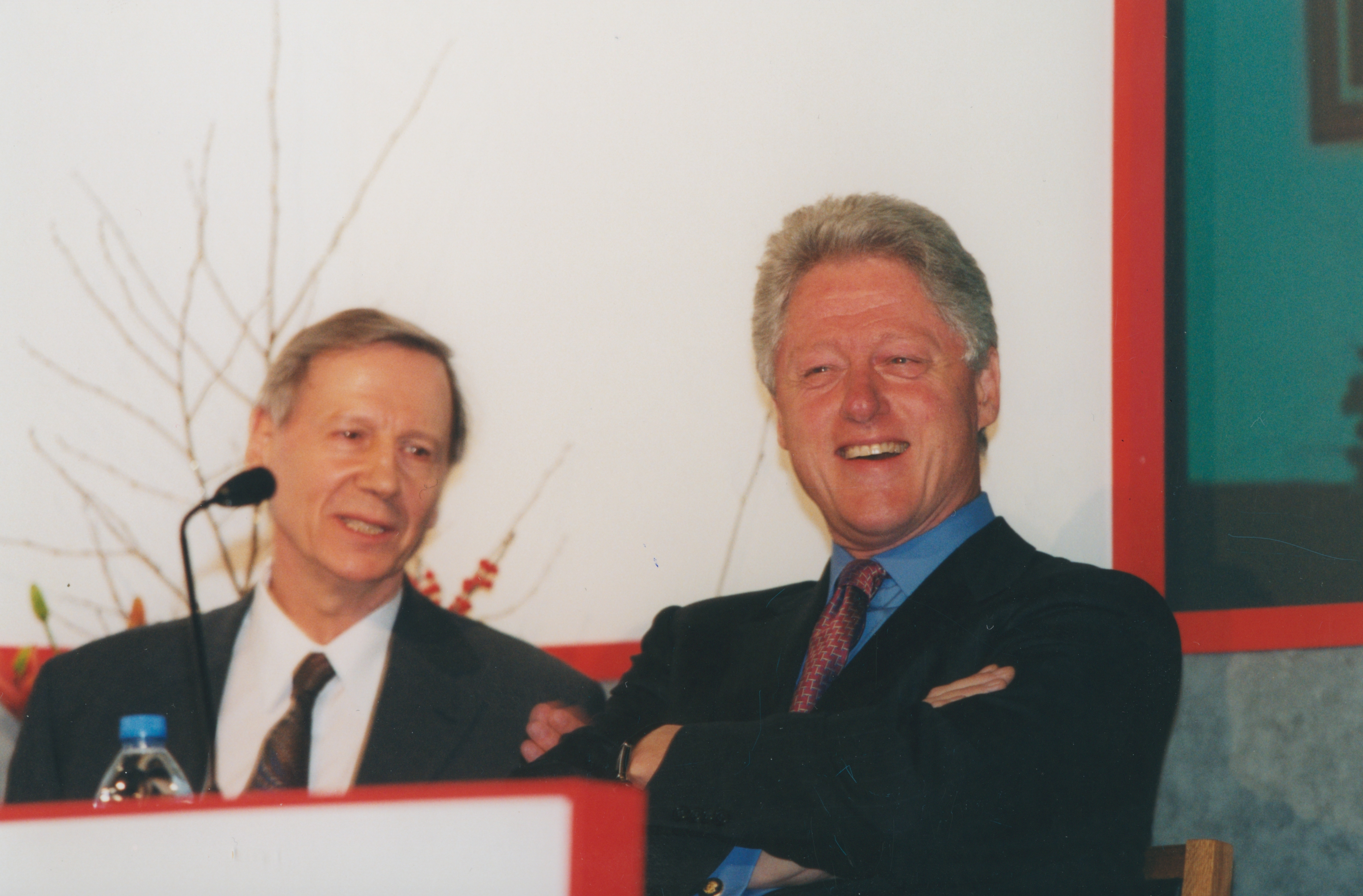
Anthony Giddens and President Clinton, two Third Way proponents

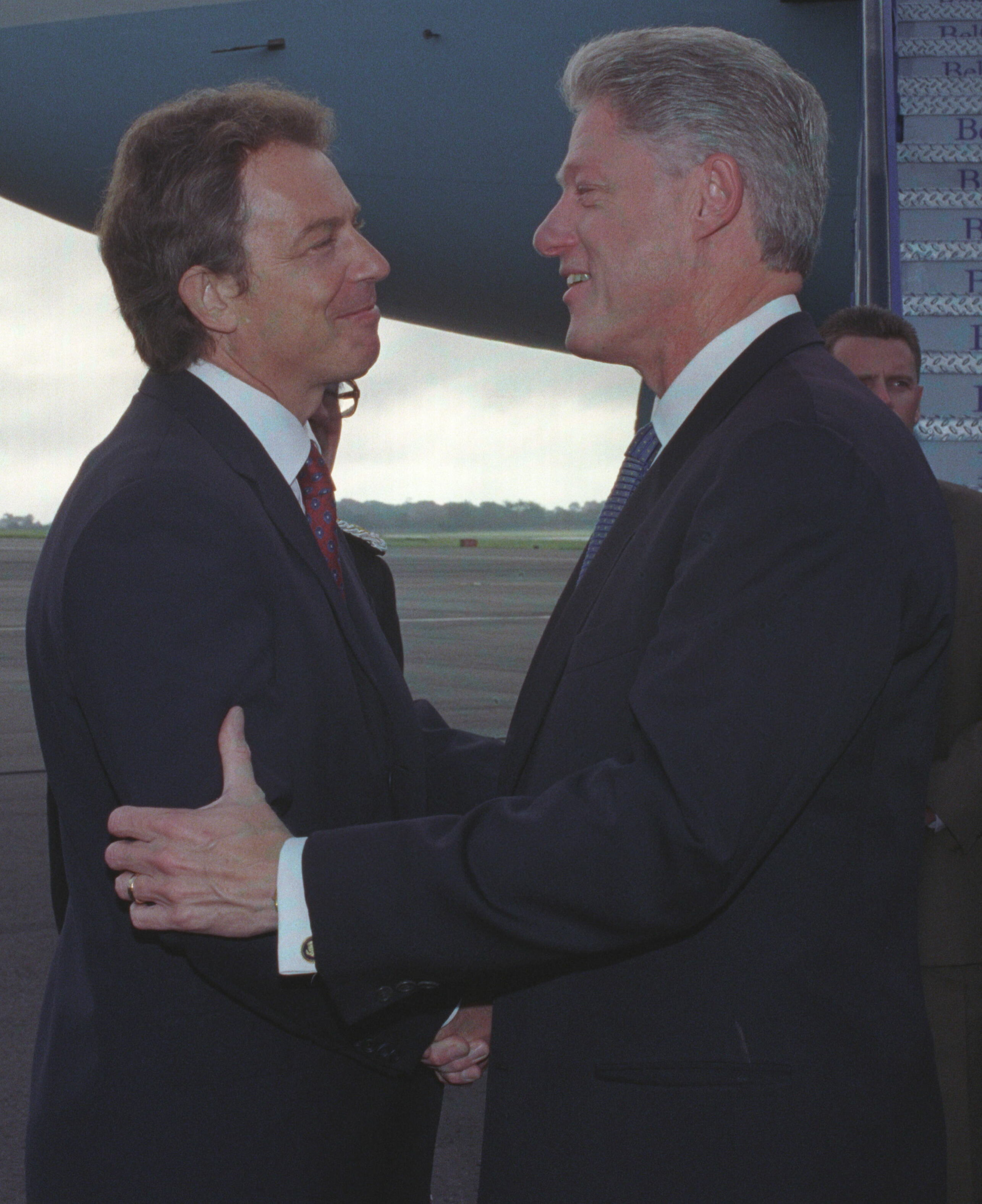
Tony Blair and Bill Clinton in Belfast

==== Ideology of Bill Clinton ====
Bill Clinton espoused the ideas of the Third Way during his 1992 presidential campaign. When he took office he further supported the Third Way, as can be seen in his ideological views and domestic policies. In terms of economy, Clinton supported neoliberal economic policies like free trade combined with "welfare state liberalism," economic nationalism, keynesianism, state interventionism and neo-keynesianism. This variant of neoliberalism embraced by third way politicians is called "centre-left neoliberalism" or progressive neoliberalism. Third way politicians reject traditional neoliberalism like that of Reagan, Thatcher, and Friedman. Clinton also advocated for some counter-supply-side economic policies, while Paul Krugman had the opinion that it was good, Alan Reynolds on the other hand claims that Clinton supported supply-side economics. Alan Blinder, an economic adviser to Clinton, called supply-side economics an "ill-fated" and perhaps "silly" school in the pages of a 2006 textbook. The Cato Institute criticized Clinton, but consider him more economically conservative than George W. Bush. Clinton's economic views and policies are called Clintonomics, while his overall ideology is called Clintonism. In terms of culture, Clintonism embraces cultural liberalism. The Democratic Leadership Council (DLC), a pro-Democratic Party establishment, argues that Clintonism "stands for economic growth and opportunity; for fiscal responsibility; for work, not welfare; for preventing crime and punishing criminals; and for non-bureaucratic, empowering government" and further says that "these policies are key to the successes in the beginning of the 21st century." Bill Clinton created something called triangulation which sees Third Way ideologies as neither right nor left. Hillary Clinton, the wife of Bill Clinton, was in her youth member of a group of Rockefeller Republican, which included third way proponents like Eisenhower and Nixon as members.

=== After Clinton ===
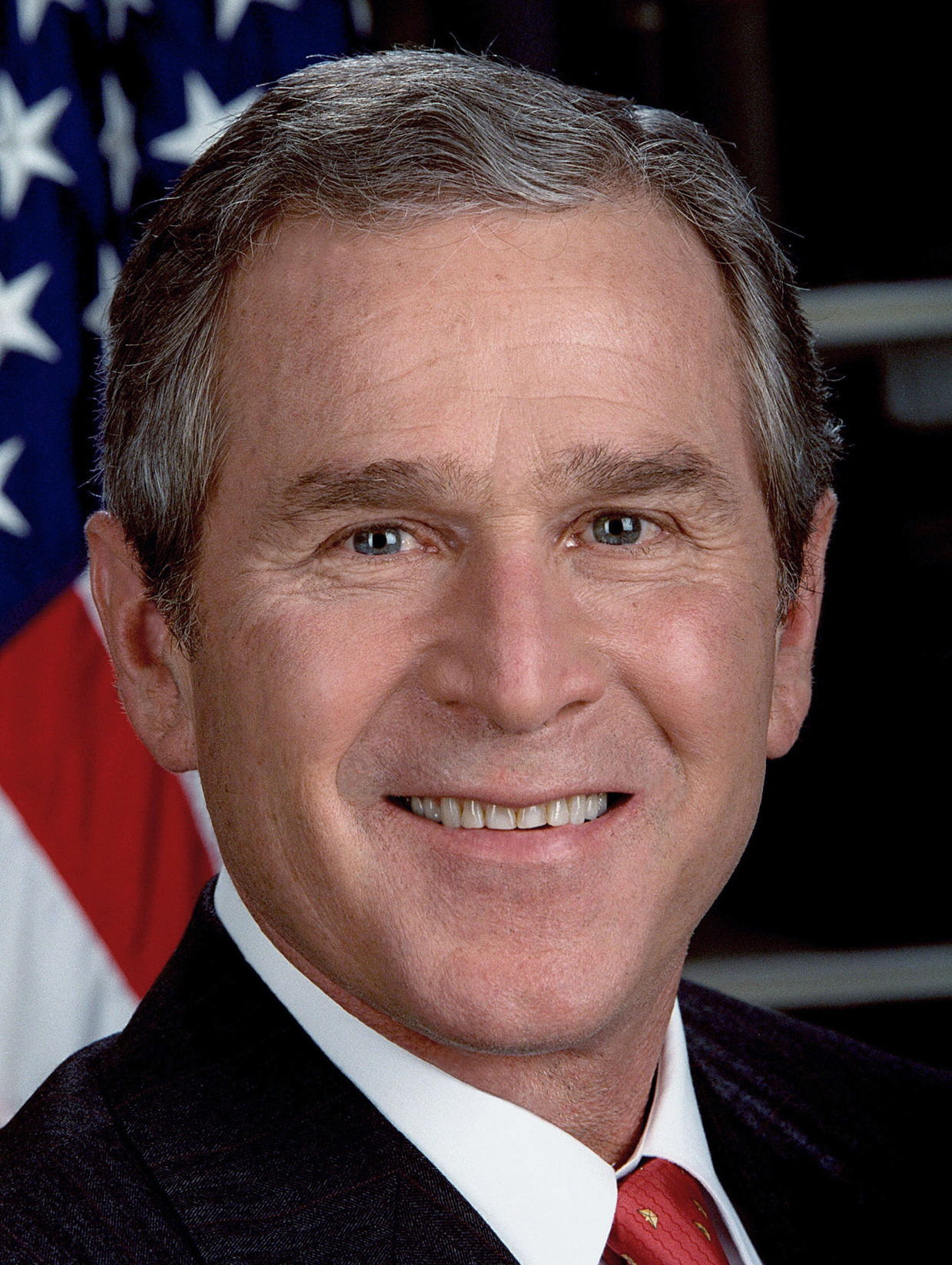
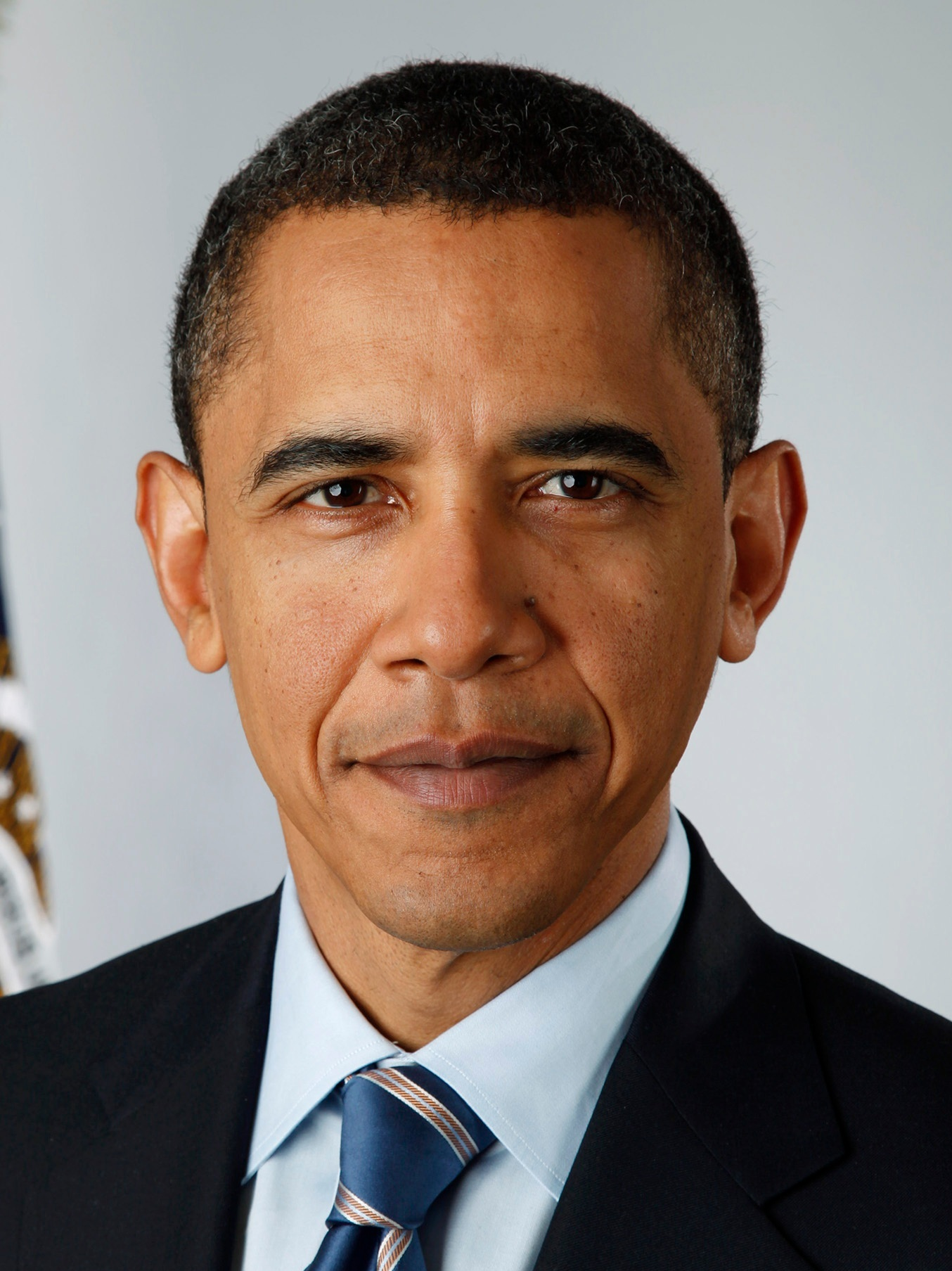
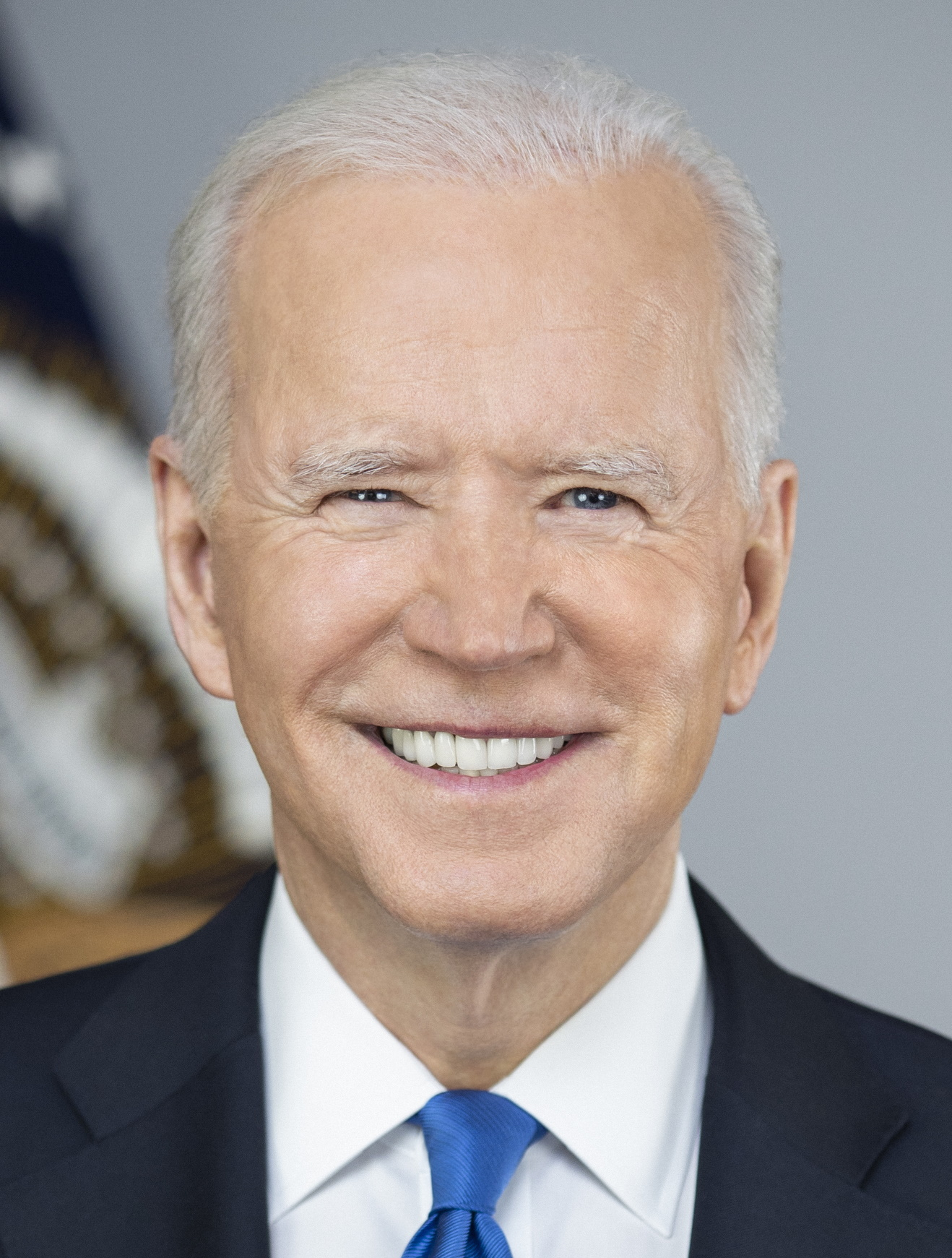
(from left to right, top to bottom) Bush, Obama and Biden are considered to be part of the Third Way after Clinton's Presidency.

==== George W. Bush views and policies ====
Similar to his father, he was an advocate for compassionate conservatism, but unlike his father he supported supply-side economics, even when he later supported keynesianism more. While Bush supported free trade and free-market capitalism, he still saw it as necessary that the state should intervene in the economy. Bush supported a bigger welfare state; due to this Bush himself said that he supported Democratic capitalism and called it "the greatest system". Unlike Reagan who used democratic capitalist economic policies like strong public sector spending due voters’ skepticism of liberal capitalism, Bush was ideological a supporter. In practice he combined neoliberalism and keynesianism. While Reagan, who was a neoliberal, also advocated for some keynesian economic policies, the difference to Bush is that Reagan was ideologically opposed to keynesianism. Besides Bush's tax cuts and his proposed privatization of social security, due his economic interventionism, Bush was criticized to be a socialist. Bush's economic policies have also been compared to Nixonomics. Consequently, Bush is seen as a Third Way politician. Lawrence Lindsey, an advocate of compassionate conservatism at the time of Bush, wrote a staunch academic defense of Reagan's supply-side tax cut in 1990; however he is no hard-core supply-sider. In fact, his book concludes that a rate reduction pays for itself in the form of higher revenues only when the top rate is 50 percent or higher. His rationale for a tax cut is demand-side stimulus — classic Keynesian economics. Greg Mankiw, former chairman of President President George W. Bush's Council of Economic Advisers, offered similarly sharp criticism of the supply-side economic school in the early editions of his introductory economics textbook. "Tax cuts rarely pay for themselves. My reading of the academic literature leads me to believe that about one-third of the cost of a typical tax cut is recouped with faster economic growth." Greg Mankiw is part of the New Keynesian economics school.

==== Third Way during Barack Obama ====
While some view Barack Obama as different from Clinton, ideologically and in practice he was close to Clinton. For example, Obama spoke positively about Clinton's welfare reforms and tax cuts, however while he had Clintonian elements he still criticized other policies of Clinton. Similarly to Clinton, Obama embraced neo-keynesianism. In March 2009, Obama said in a meeting with the New Democrat Coalition that he was a "New Democrat" and a "pro-growth Democrat", that he "supports free and fair trade", and that he was "very concerned about a return to protectionism". In 2008, he was already seen as a New Democrat. The New Democrats embrace the third way and, like George W. Bush, also Democratic capitalism. Many of Obama's cabinet picks and House and Senate Democrats were New Democrats, which gave them more influence over the government.

==== Third Way decline under Joe Biden ====
While Joe Biden is seen as a Third Way proponent like Clinton and Obama, Bloomberg noted that the Democratic Party moved away from Third Way politics under his presidency. Biden is considered to be a former New Democrat though during his presidency, he broke with New Democrat policies on some issues, such as spending and free trade. Similar to Johnson's Great Society, Bidenomics is seen as similar to the "Activist Government" of John Quincy Adams. Biden advocated for something called "modern supply-side economics", which include workfare, regulations, and government intervention.

== Persons ==
- Presidents
  - Harry S Truman
  - Dwight D. Eisenhower
  - Lyndon B. Johnson
  - Richard Nixon
  - Gerald Ford (disputed)
  - Jimmy Carter (disputed)
  - George H.W Bush
  - Bill Clinton
  - George W. Bush
  - Barack Obama
  - Joe Biden (disputed)
- Other politicians:
  - Aaron Guckian
  - Beto O'Rourke
  - Bradley Scott Schneider
  - Chester James Carville Jr.
  - Charles Ellis Schumer
  - Claire Conner McCaskill
  - Donald Carcieri
  - Doug Wead
  - Elissa Blair Slotkin
  - Evan Bayh
  - Hillary Clinton
  - Jack Kemp (later)
  - James Robert Jones
  - Joshua S. Gottheimer
  - Lawrence Lindsey
  - Lincoln Carter Almond
  - Marvin Olasky
  - Matt Bennett
  - Michael John Gerson
  - Mitt Romney
  - Myron Magnet
  - Peter Rey Aguilar
  - Ray Shamie
  - Robert Dole
  - Simon Rosenberg
  - Steve Forbes
  - Vernon Eulion Jordan Jr
  - Will Marshall

== Ideologies and economics ==
- Bidenomics (disputed)
- Clintonism
- Clintonomics
- Compassionate conservatism
- Nixonomics
- Obamanomics

== Organizations ==
- Democratic Party (New Democrat Coalition)
- Third Way
- American Enterprise Institute (some people)
- New Democrat Network (historical)

== See also ==
- Third Way
- Third Way in Germany
- Third Way in Brazil
- Third Way (Think Tank)
