= Politics of Brazil =

Politics of Brazil Política do Brasil
- Coat of arms of Brazil
- Polity type: Federal presidential constitutional republic
- Constitution: Constitution of Brazil

Legislative branch
- Name: National Congress
- Type: Bicameral
- Meeting place: National Congress Palace
- Upper house
- Name: Federal Senate
- Presiding officer: Davi Alcolumbre, President of the Federal Senate
- Lower house
- Name: Chamber of Deputies
- Presiding officer: Hugo Motta, President of the Chamber of Deputies

Executive branch
- Head of state and government
- Title: President
- Currently: Luiz Inácio Lula da Silva
- Appointer: Direct popular vote
- Cabinet
- Name: Cabinet of Brazil
- Current cabinet: Second cabinet of Lula da Silva
- Leader: President
- Deputy leader: Vice President
- Appointer: President
- Headquarters: Palácio do Planalto
- Ministries: 37

Judicial branch
- Name: Judiciary of Brazil
- Courts: Federal courts of Brazil
- Supreme Federal Court
- Chief judge: Edson Fachin
- Superior Court of Justice
- Chief judge: Herman Benjamin

The politics of Brazil take place in a framework of a federal presidential representative democratic republic, whereby the President is both head of state and head of government, and of a multi-party system. The political and administrative organization of Brazil comprises the federal government, the 26 states and a federal district, and the municipalities.

The federal government exercises control over the central government and is divided into three independent branches: executive, legislative and judicial. Executive power is exercised by the President, advised by a cabinet. Legislative power is vested upon the National Congress, a two-chamber legislature comprising the Federal Senate and the Chamber of Deputies. Judicial power is exercised by the judiciary, consisting of the Supreme Federal Court, the Superior Court of Justice and other Superior Courts, the National Justice Council and the Regional Federal Courts.

The states are autonomous sub-national entities with their own governments that, together with the other federal units, form the Federative Republic of Brazil. Currently, Brazil is divided politically and administratively into 27 federal units, being 26 states and one federal district. The executive power is exercised by a governor elected to a four-year term. The judiciary is exercised by courts of first and second instance addressing the common justice. Each state has a unicameral legislature with deputies who vote on state laws. The Constitution of Brazil also contains two elements of direct democracy, stated in Article 14. The legislative assemblies supervise the activities of the Executive power of the states and municipalities.

The municipalities are minor federal units of the Federative Republic of Brazil. Each municipality has an autonomous local government, comprising a mayor, directly elected by the people to a four-year term, and a legislative body, also directly elected by the people.

Brazil has an unrestricted multiparty system with a large number of political parties. Some parties lack ideological consistency and it is common for congressmen to switch parties, weakening electoral coalitions. At same time, the high number of political parties makes the Executive need to gather alliances of different political parties must piece together diverse and often ideologically incoherent coalitions to pass legislation (this is known as coalition presidentialism). The Economist Intelligence Unit's Democracy Index rated Brazil as a "flawed democracy" in 2022. Brazil was in 2023 the 13th most electoral democratic country in Latin America and the Caribbean according to the V-Dem Democracy indices.

== Constitution ==
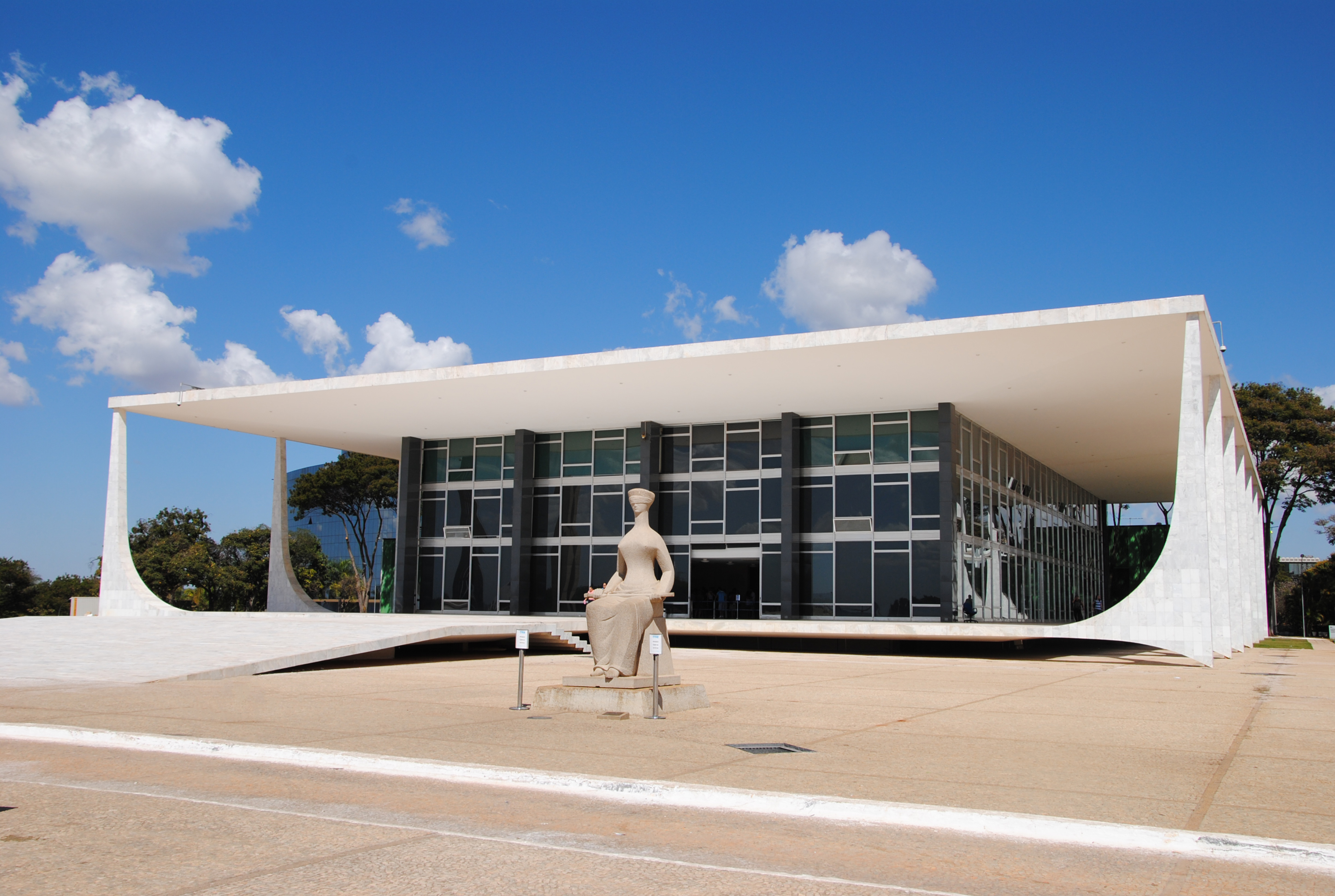
Supreme Federal Court

Brazil has had seven constitutions:

- Constitution of 1824 – the first Brazilian constitution, enacted by Emperor Pedro I. It was monarchic, hereditary, and highly centralized, permitting suffrage only to property-holders.
- Constitution of 1891 – the republic was proclaimed in 1889, but a new constitution was not promulgated until 1891. This federalist, democratic constitution was heavily influenced by the U.S. model. However, women and illiterates were not permitted to vote.
- Constitution of 1934 – when Getúlio Vargas came to power in 1930, he canceled the 1891 constitution and did not permit a new one until 1934. The Constitutionalist Revolution of 1932 forced Vargas to enact a new democratic constitution that permitted women's suffrage. Getúlio Vargas was indirectly elected president by the Constitutional Assembly to a four-year term, beginning in 1933.
- Constitution of 1937 – Getúlio Vargas suppressed a Communist uprising in 1935 and two years later (November 10, 1937) used it as a pretext to establish autocratic rule. He instituted a corporatist constitution nicknamed the Polish, (because it was said to have been inspired by a Polish constitution), written by Francisco Campos.
- Constitution of 1946 – in October, 1945, with World War II over, a civil-military coup ousted dictatorial Getúlio Vargas, an Assembly wrote a democratic constitution.
- Constitution of 1967 – after the 1964 coup d'État against João Goulart, the military dictatorship passed the Institutional Acts, a supraconstitutional law. This strongly undemocratic constitution simply incorporated these Acts.
- Constitution of 1988 – the current constitution, drafted in the process of redemocratization. It is marked by a reaction to the military dictatorship, guaranteeing individual rights, it is also more expansive than a typical constitution – many statutory acts in other countries are written into this constitution, like Social Security and taxes.

== Political parties and elections ==
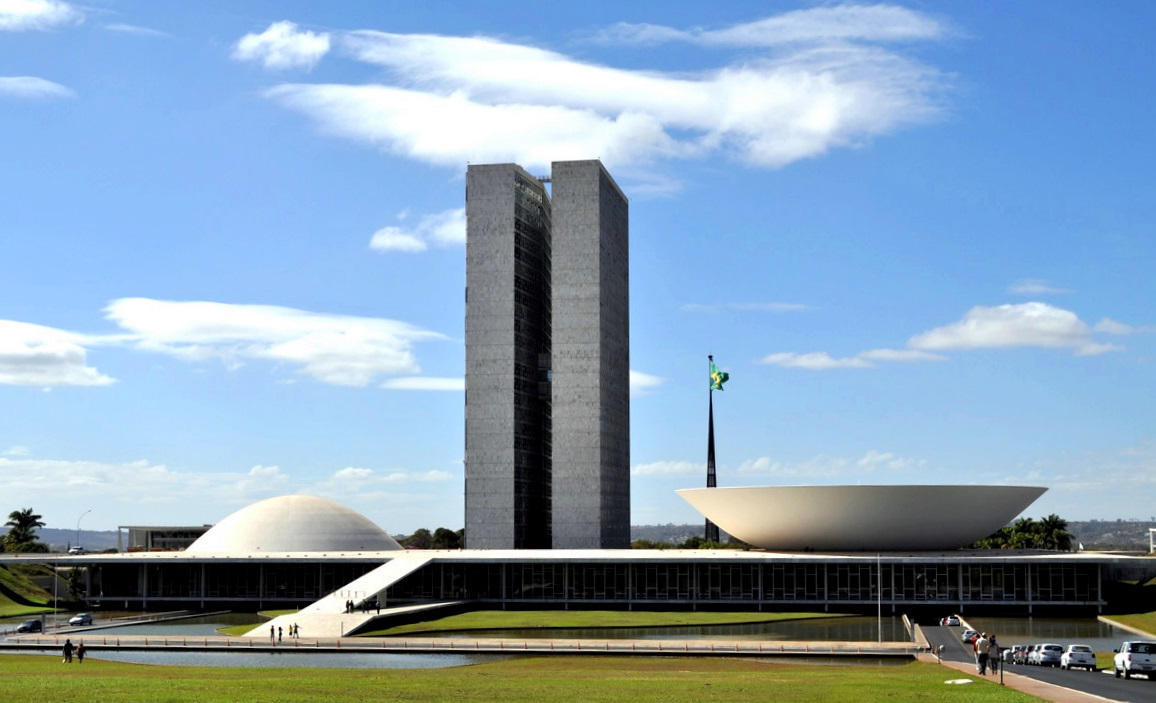
National Congress of Brazil, the national legislature and the only in bicameral format

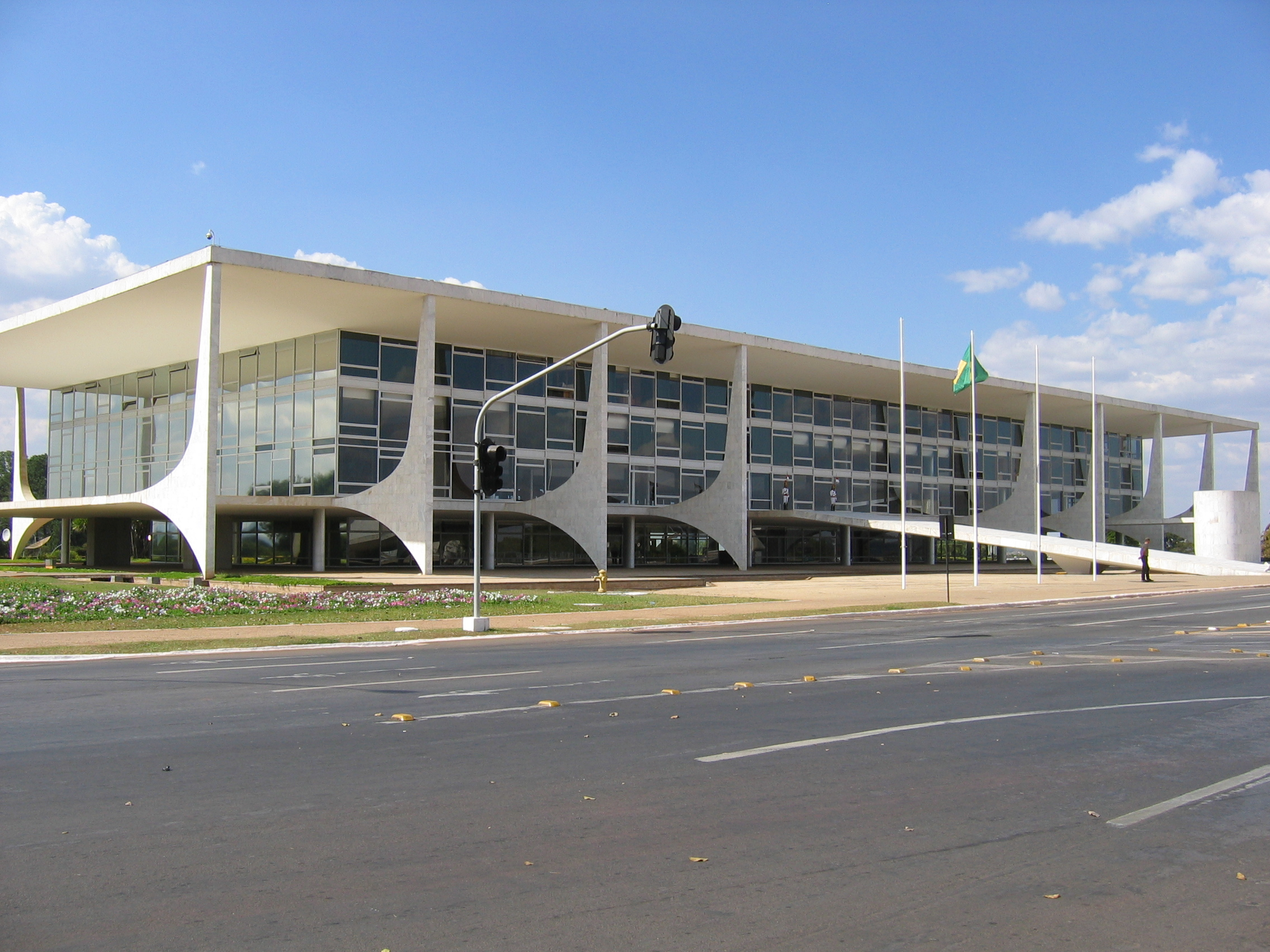
Palácio do Planalto, the seat of the executive power

According to sociologist Marcelo Ridenti, Brazilian politics is divided between internationalist liberals and statist nationalists. The first group consists of politicians arguing that internationalization of the economy is essential for the development of the country, while the latter rely on interventionism, and protection of state enterprises. According to Ridenti, who cites the Fernando Henrique Cardoso administration as an example of the first group and the Luiz Inácio Lula da Silva administration as an example of the second, "we have it cyclically".

Lula's Workers' Party tended to the statist nationalist side, although there are privatizing forces within his party and government, while Cardoso's Social Democratic Party tended to favor the international private market side by taking neoliberal policies as with the global Third Way. Lula compares himself with Getúlio Vargas, Juscelino Kubitschek and João Goulart, presidents seen as statist nationalists.

As of May 2017, 16,668,589 Brazilians were affiliated with a political party. The largest parties are MDB (which accounts for 14.4% of affiliated voters), the PT (9.5% of affiliated voters), and PSDB (8.7% of affiliated voters).

In 2020, the scenario is that the country has more than 30 active political parties, and only one of them defines itself as a right-wing party (PL), with a clear political imbalance. The country has several far-left parties like PSOL, PCO, PSTU, PCB, UP, PCdoB, left parties like PT, PSB, PDT, PV, Rede and Solidariedade and center-left like PSDB, PMN and Cidadania. Ten parties declare themselves as the center: MDB, PSD, Agir, DC, PROS, Avante, Patriota, Podemos and PMB. Five parties declare themselves as center-right: Brazil Union, PTB, Progressistas, PSC, PRTB and Republicanos. The only party that claims to be purely liberal, without further consideration, is Novo. When asked about their ideological spectrum, Brazilian parties tend to give obtuse and non-conclusive answers on the subject.

== Government ==
=== Federal government ===
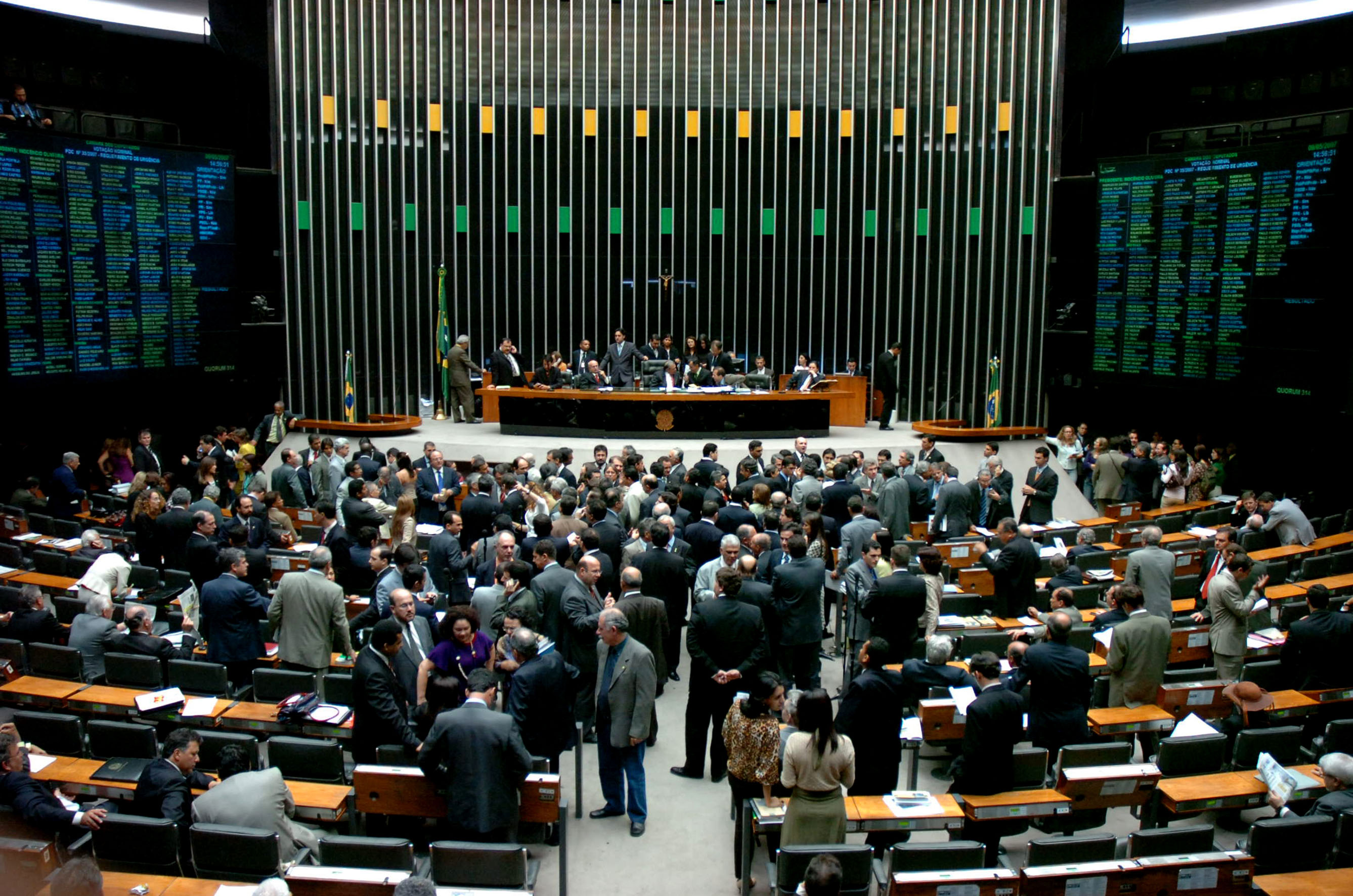
Chamber of Deputies, the lower house

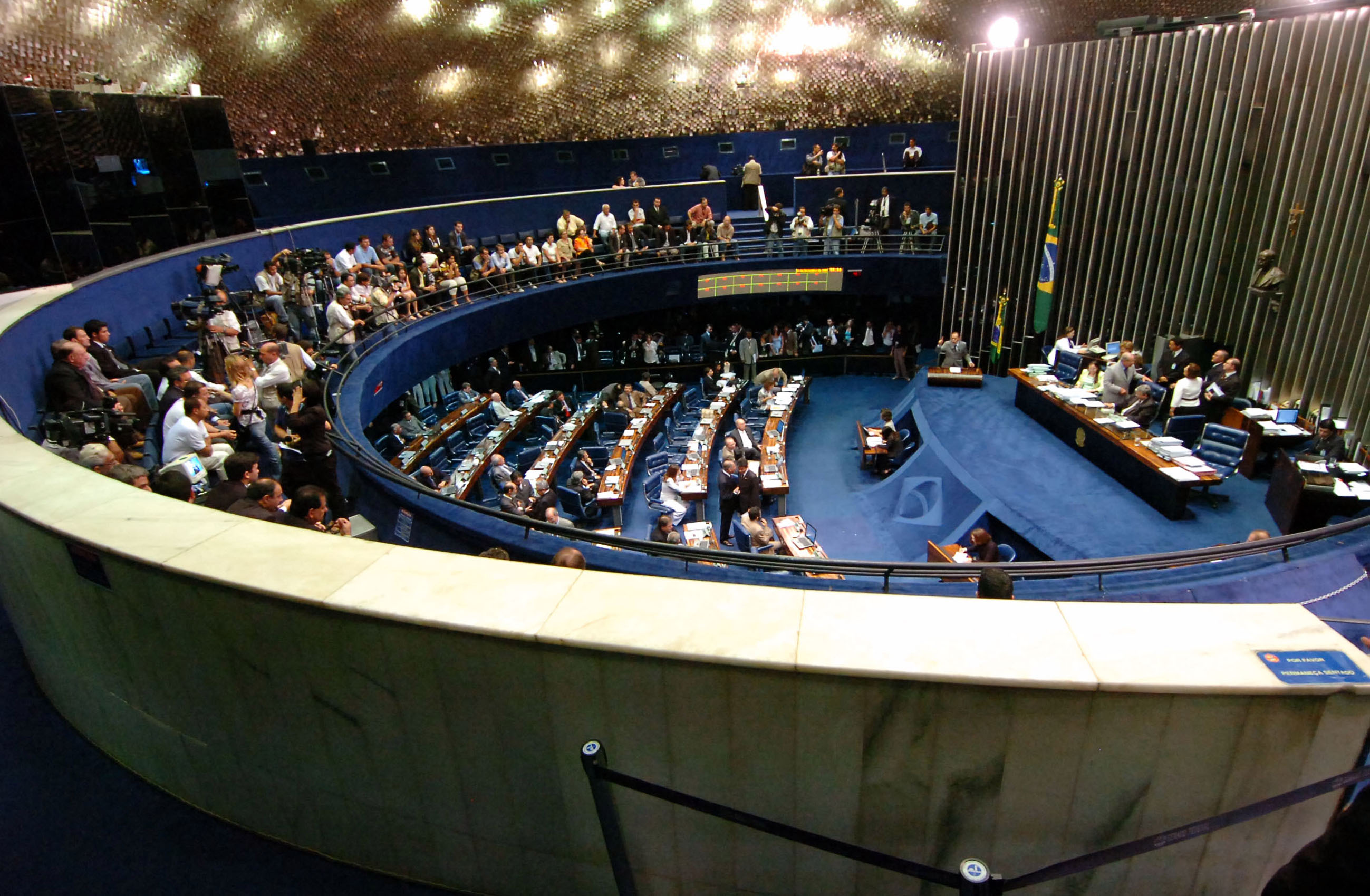
Federal Senate, the upper house

Brazil is a federal presidential constitutional republic, based on representative democracy. The federal government has three independent branches: executive, legislative, and judicial. Executive power is exercised by the executive branch, headed by the President, advised by a Cabinet. The President is both the head of state and the head of government. Legislative power is vested upon the National Congress, a two-chamber legislature comprising the Federal Senate and the Chamber of Deputies. Judicial power is exercised by the judiciary, consisting of the Supreme Federal Court, the Superior Court of Justice and other Superior Courts, the National Justice Council and the Regional Federal Courts.

=== States ===
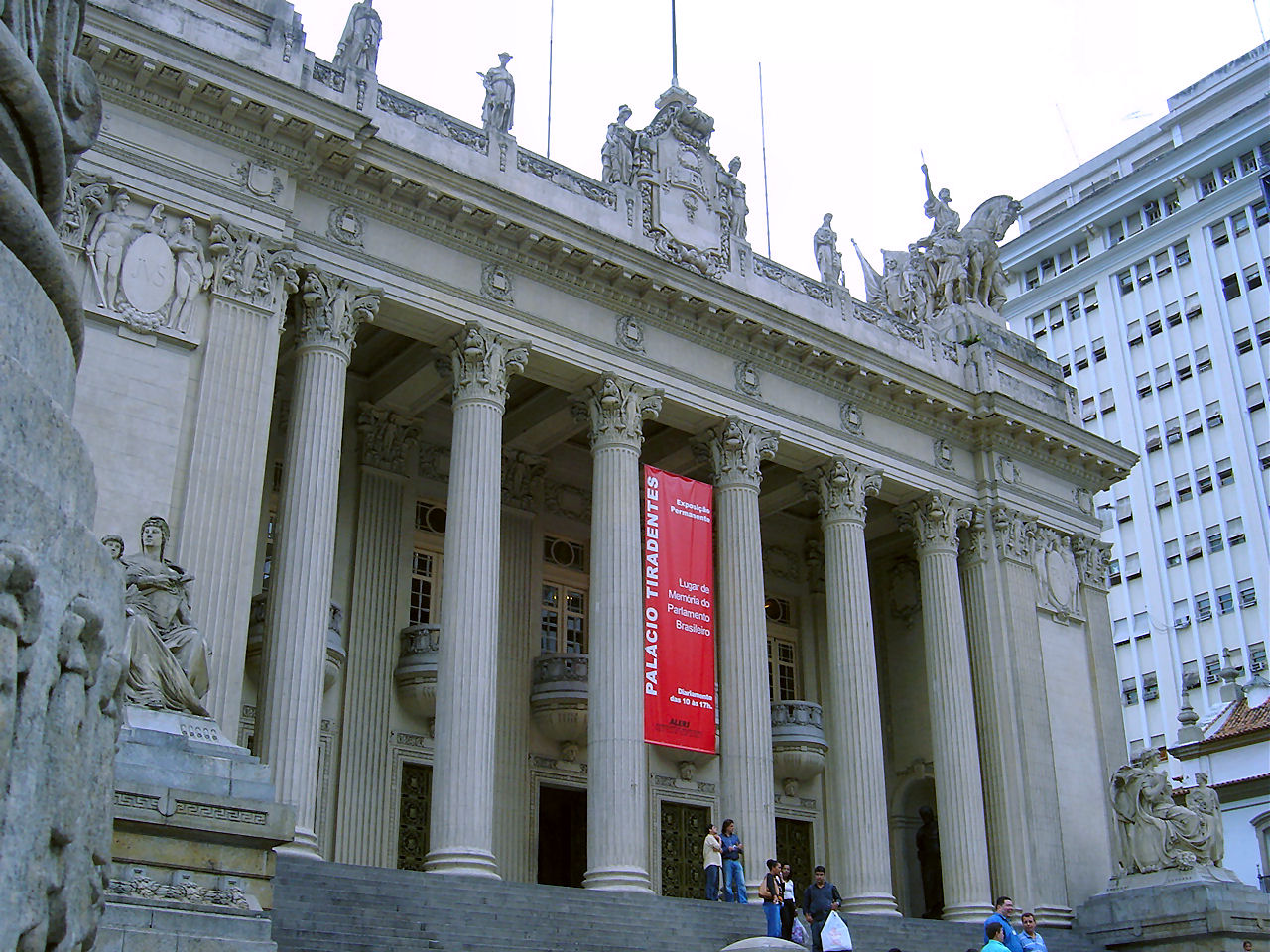
The Legislative Assembly of Rio de Janeiro holds the legislature of Rio de Janeiro state.

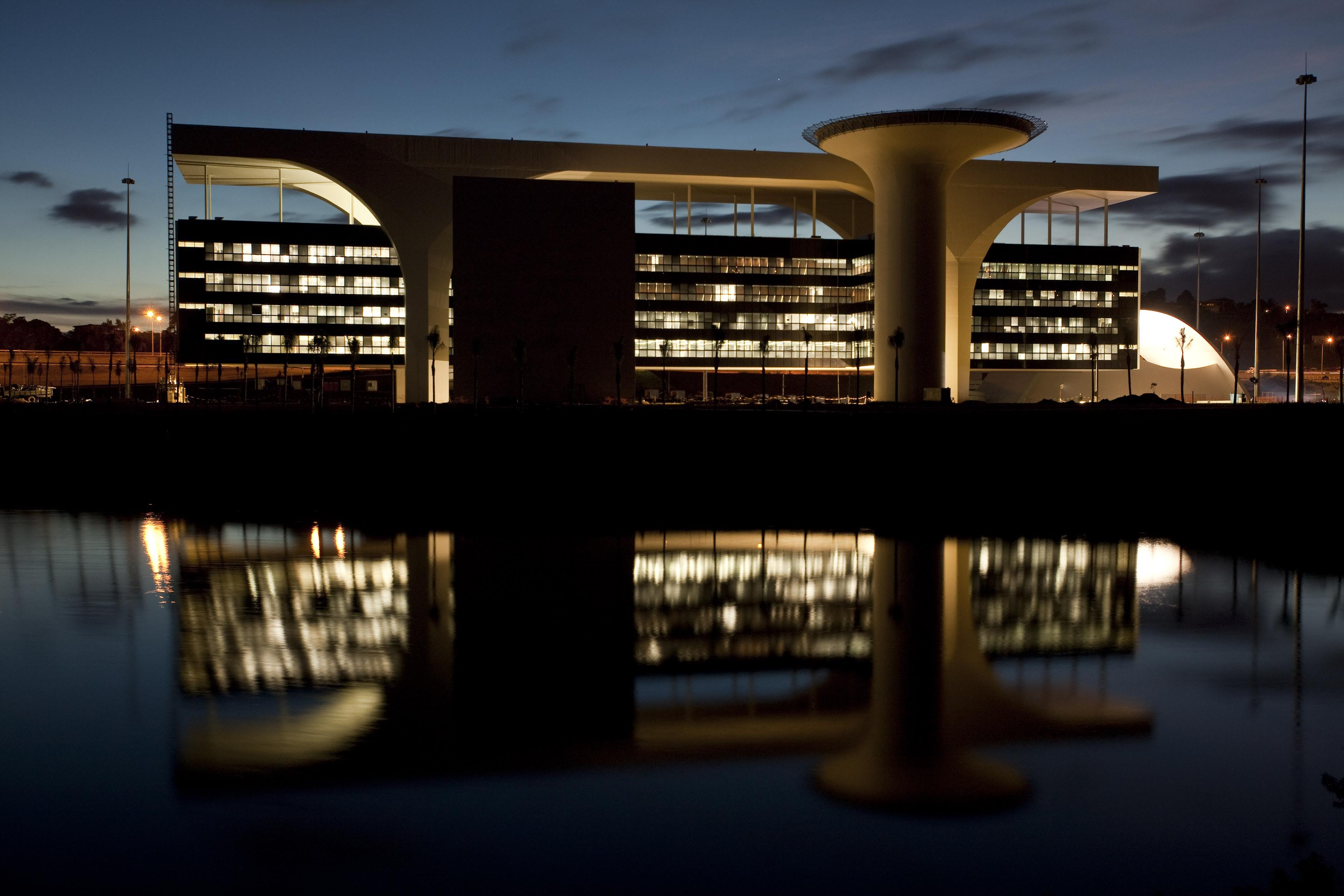
Palácio Tiradentes holds the executive power of Minas Gerais state.

The 26 Brazilian states are semi-autonomous self-governing entities organized with complete administration branches, relative financial independence and their own set of symbols, similar to those owned by the country itself. Despite their relative autonomy they all have the same model of administration, as set by the Federal Constitution.

States hold elections every four years and exercise a considerable amount of power. The 1988 constitution allows states to keep their own taxes, set up State Houses, and mandates regular allocation of a share of the taxes collected locally by the federal government.

The Executive role is held by the Governador (Governor) and his appointed Secretários (Secretaries); the Legislative role is held by the Assembléia Legislativa (Legislative Assembly); and the Judiciary role, by the Tribunal de Justiça (Justice Tribunal). The governors and the members of the assemblies are elected, but the members of the Judiciary are appointed by the governor from a list provided by the current members of the State Law Court containing only judges (these are chosen by merit in exams open to anyone with a law degree). The name chosen by the governor must be approved by the Assembly before inauguration. The 1988 Constitution has granted the states the greatest amount of autonomy since the Old Republic.

Each of the 26 state governors must achieve more than 50% of the vote, including a second round run-off between the top two candidates if necessary. In contrast to the federal level, state legislatures are unicameral, although the deputies are elected through similar means, involving an open-list system in which the state serves as one constituency. State level elections occur at the same time as those for the presidency and Congress. In 2002, candidates from eight different parties won the gubernatorial contest while 28 parties are represented in the country's state legislatures. The last set of elections took place in 2006.

=== Municipalities ===
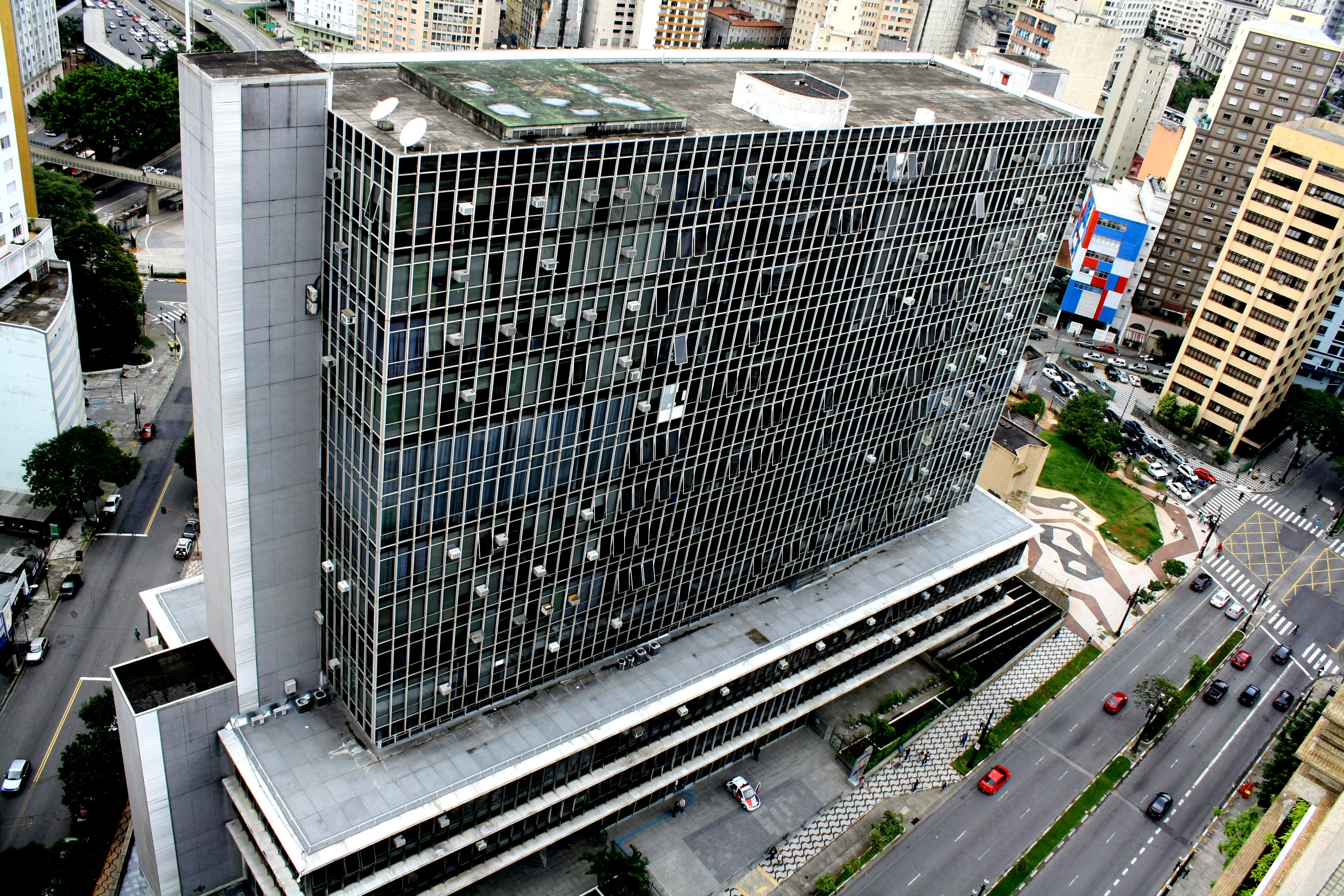
The Municipal Chamber of São Paulo, the municipal legislature of São Paulo city

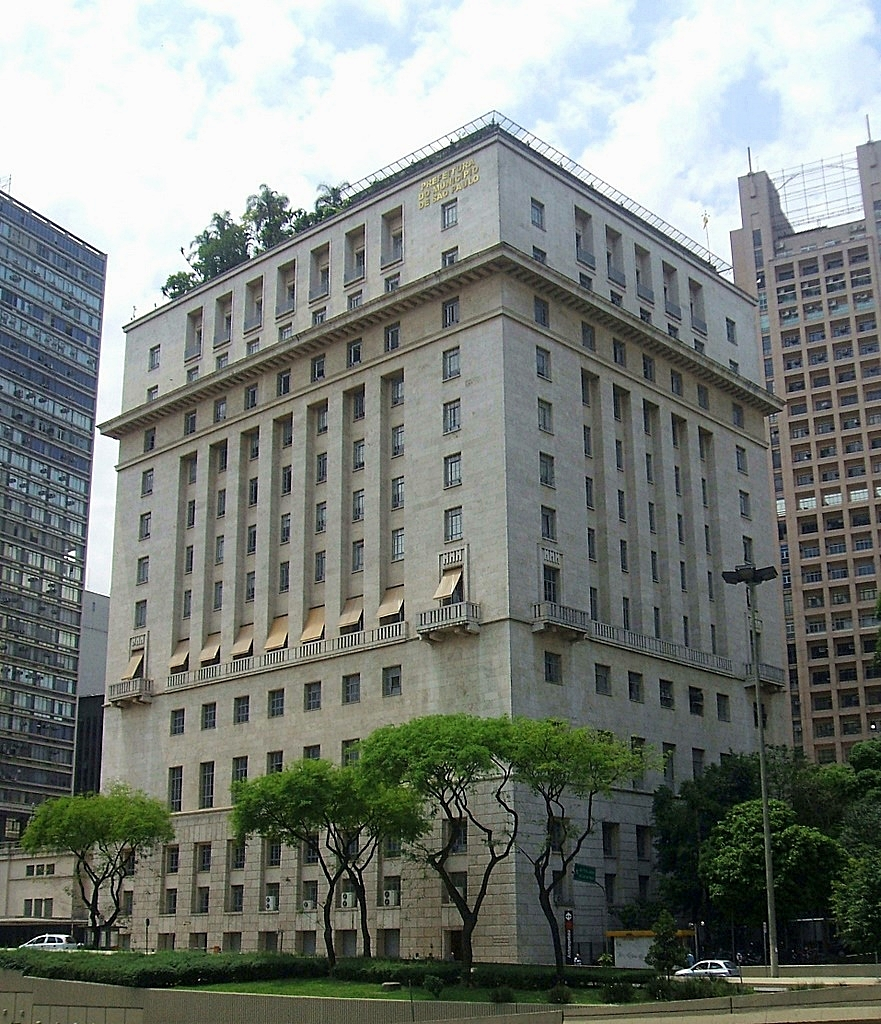
Palácio do Anhangabaú holds the municipal executive power of São Paulo.

Brazil has no clear distinction between towns and cities (in effect, the Portuguese word cidade means both). The only possible difference is regarding the municipalities that have a court of first instance and those that do not. The former are called Sedes de Comarca (seats of a comarca, which is the territory under the rule of that court). Other than that, only size and importance differs one from another.

The municipality (município) is a territory comprising one urban area, the sede (seat), from which it takes the name, and several other minor urban or rural areas, the distritos (districts). The seat of a municipality must be the most populous urban area within it; when another urban area grows too much it usually splits from the original municipality to form another one.

A municipality is relatively autonomous: it enacts its own "constitution", which is called organic law (Lei Orgânica), and it is allowed to collect taxes and fees, to maintain a municipal police force (albeit with very restricted powers), to pass laws on any matter that do not contradict either the state or the national constitutions, and to create symbols for itself (like a flag, an anthem and a coat-of-arms). However, not all municipalities exercise all of this autonomy. For instance, only a few municipalities keep local police forces, some of them do not collect some taxes (to attract investors or residents) and many of them do not have a flag (although they are all required to have a coat-of-arms).

Municipalities are governed by an elected prefeito (Mayor) and a unicameral Câmara de Vereadores (Councillors' Chamber). In municipalities with more than 200,000 voters, the Mayor must be elected by more than 50% of the valid vote. The executive power is called Prefeitura.

Brazilian municipalities can vary widely in area and population. The municipality of Altamira, in the State of Pará, with 161,445.9 square kilometres of area, is larger than many countries in the world. Several Brazilian municipalities have over 1,000,000 inhabitants, with São Paulo, at more than 9,000,000, being the most populous.

Until 1974 Brazil had one state-level municipality, the State of Guanabara, now merged with the State of Rio de Janeiro, which comprised the city of Rio de Janeiro solely.

=== Federal District ===
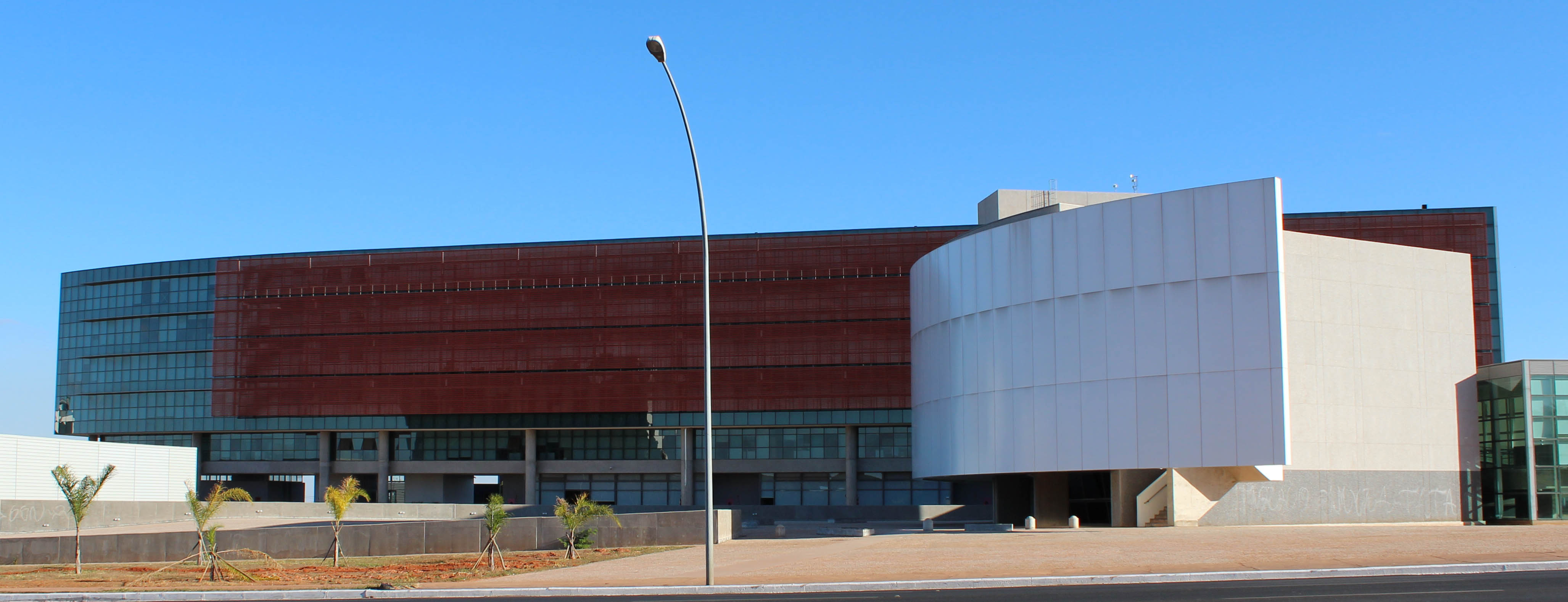
Legislative Chamber of the Federal District

The Federal District is an anomalous unit of the federation, as it is not organized in the same manner as a municipality, does not possess the same autonomy as a state (though usually ranked among them), and is closely related to the central power.

It is considered a single and indivisible entity, constituted by the seat, Brasília and some of the satellite cities. Brasília and the satellite cities are governed by the Regional Administrators individually and as a whole are governed by the Governor of the Federal District.

== History ==
Throughout its modern history, Brazil has struggled to build a democratic and egalitarian society because of its origins as a plantation colony and the strong influence of slavery.

=== Empire ===
In 1822 the Prince Pedro de Alcântara, son of King John VI of Portugal, proclaimed independence. He was the first Emperor (Pedro I) until his abdication in 1831 in favor of his elder son. Due to the son's age (five years) a regency was established and the country had its first elections, though voting was restricted to a minority of the population.

=== Old Republic (1889–1930) ===
In 1889, Marshal Deodoro da Fonseca declared the republic, by a coup d'état.

When the republic succeeded the empire, Auguste Comte's motto "Order and Progress" appeared on the flag of the Republic and the 1891 Constitution was inspired by Auguste Comte's Course of Positive Philosophy and System of Positive Politics. The Republic's beginnings were marked by "coronelism", an equivalent of the caudillism of the Spanish-speaking countries. The "old republic" (1889–1930) is also known as the "oligarchic republic".

Until 1930, the Brazilian republic was formally a democracy, although the power was concentrated in the hands of powerful land owners.

=== Vargas years (1930–1945) ===
In 1930, a bloodless coup led Getúlio Vargas to power. For about 15 years, he controlled the country's politics, with a brief three-year constitutional interregnum from 1934 to 1937. A longer, heavier regime, the Estado Novo had loose ties with European fascism and spanned the years 1938 to 1945.

=== Populist years (1946–1964) ===
Like most of Latin America, Brazil experienced times of political instability after the Second World War. When Vargas was ousted from the presidency in another bloodless coup d'état, in 1945, a new and modern constitution was passed and the country had its first experience with an effective and widespread democracy. But the mounting tension between populist politicians (like Vargas himself and, later, Jânio Quadros) and the right led to a crisis that ultimately brought up the military coup d'état in 1964, now known, through declassified documents, to have been supported by the American Central Intelligence Agency.

=== Military dictatorship (1964–1985) ===
In 1964 a military-led coup d'état deposed the democratically elected president of Brazil, João Goulart. Between 1964 and 1985, Brazil was governed by the military, with a two-party system that comprised a pro-government National Renewal Alliance Party (ARENA) and an opposition Brazilian Democratic Movement (MDB). Thousands of politicians (including former president Juscelino Kubitschek) had their political rights suspended, and military-sanctioned indirect elections were held for most elected positions until political liberalization during the government of João Figueiredo.

=== New Republic (1985–1990) ===
In 1985, the military were defeated in an election according to the scheme they had set up as a consequence of the loss of political support among the elites. The opposition candidate, Tancredo Neves, was elected president, but died of natural causes before he was able to take office. Fearing a political vacuum that might stifle the democratic effort, Neves' supporters urged vice-president, José Sarney to take the oath and govern the country. Tancredo Neves had said that his election and the demise of military régime would create a "New Republic" and Sarney's term of government is often referred to by this name.

Sarney's government was disastrous in almost every field. The ongoing recession and the soaring external debt drained the country's assets while ravaging inflation (which later turned into hyperinflation) demonetized the currency and prevented any stability. In an attempt to revolutionize the economy and defeat inflation, Sarney carried on an ambitious "heterodox" economic plan (Cruzado) in 1986, which included price controls, default on the external debts and reduction of salaries. The plan seemed successful for some months, but it soon caused wholesale shortages of consumer goods (especially of easily exportable goods like meat, milk, automobiles, grains, sugar and alcohol) and the appearance of a black market in which such goods were sold for higher prices. Buoyed by the ensuing popularity from the apparent success of the plan, Sarney secured the largest electoral win in Brazilian history; the party he had just joined, Brazilian Democratic Movement Party (PMDB), won in 26 out of 27 states and in more than 3,000 municipalities. Just after the elections, Sarney's "corrections" to the economy failed to control inflation and the public perception that he had used an artificial control of inflation to win the elections proved to be his undoing. His popularity never recovered and he was plagued by vehement criticism from most sectors of society until the end of his term. Despite popular rejection, Sarney managed to extend his term from four to five years, and exerted pressure on the Constitutional Assembly that was drafting the new constitution to abort the adoption of Parliamentarism.

=== Collor government (1990–1992) ===
In 1989 Fernando Collor de Mello was elected president for the term from 1990 to 1994. The elections were marked by unanimous condemnation of José Sarney, with all candidates trying to keep distance from him.

Collor made some very bold statements, like saying that the Brazilian industry (of which the Brazilians used to be very proud) was mostly obsolete and polluting or that defaulting the debt was equal to not paying the rent. He also took quite revolutionary measures, like reducing the number of ministries to only 12 and naming Zélia Cardoso de Mello Minister of Economy or removing existing barriers to importing of goods.

His inflation control plan was based on an attempt to control prices and a complicated currency conversion process that prevented people from cashing their bank accounts for 18 months.

All of this made him quite unpopular and denied him support in the parliament that he needed since his own party held few seats. At the beginning of his third year in office, he resigned as a result of in a huge corruption scandal. The charges against him would later be dropped, some on mere technicalities, some for actually being irrelevant or false.

Collor desperately tried to resist impeachment by rallying the support of the youth and of the lower classes, but his call for help was answered by massive popular demonstrations, led mostly by students, demanding his resignation.

=== Itamar government (1992–1994) ===
In 1992, the vice-president, Itamar Franco, took office as president and managed to evade the most feared consequences of Collor's downfall. He had to face a country with hyper-inflation, high levels of misery and unemployment. Far-left organizations were trying to turn the anti-Collor campaign into a wider revolutionary fight to overthrow the regime. Itamar finally granted full powers to his Minister of Economy, Fernando Henrique Cardoso, so the minister could launch the Plano Real, a new economic plan that seemed to be just the same as the many unsuccessful plans launched by Sarney, Collor and their military predecessor. But the Real was a success because of Rubens Ricupero and essentially because of Ciro Gomes, according to Itamar Franco himself, and terminated inflation in a few months.

=== FHC government (1995–2003) ===
In 1994, Cardoso with Ricupero, Ciro Gomes and others launched their Plano Real, a successful economic reform that managed to permanently rid the country of the excessive inflation that had plagued it for more than forty years. The plan consisted of replacing the discredited old currency (cruzeiro and cruzeiro real) and pegging its value temporarily to the United States dollar. Inflation – which had become a fact of Brazilian life – was cut dramatically, a change that the Brazilians took years to get used to. Because of the success of Plano Real, Cardoso was chosen by his party to run for president and, with the strong support of Franco, eventually won, beating Luiz Inácio Lula da Silva, who had emerged as the favorite only one year earlier.

Cardoso's term was marked by other major changes in Brazilian politics and economy. Public services and state-owned companies were privatized (some for values supposedly too cheap according to his adversaries), the strong real made it easy to import goods, forcing Brazilian industry to modernize and compete (which had the side effect of causing many of them to be bought by foreign companies). During his first term, a constitutional amendment was passed to enable a sitting Executive chief to run for re-election, after which he again beat Lula in 1998.

=== Lula government (2003–2011) ===
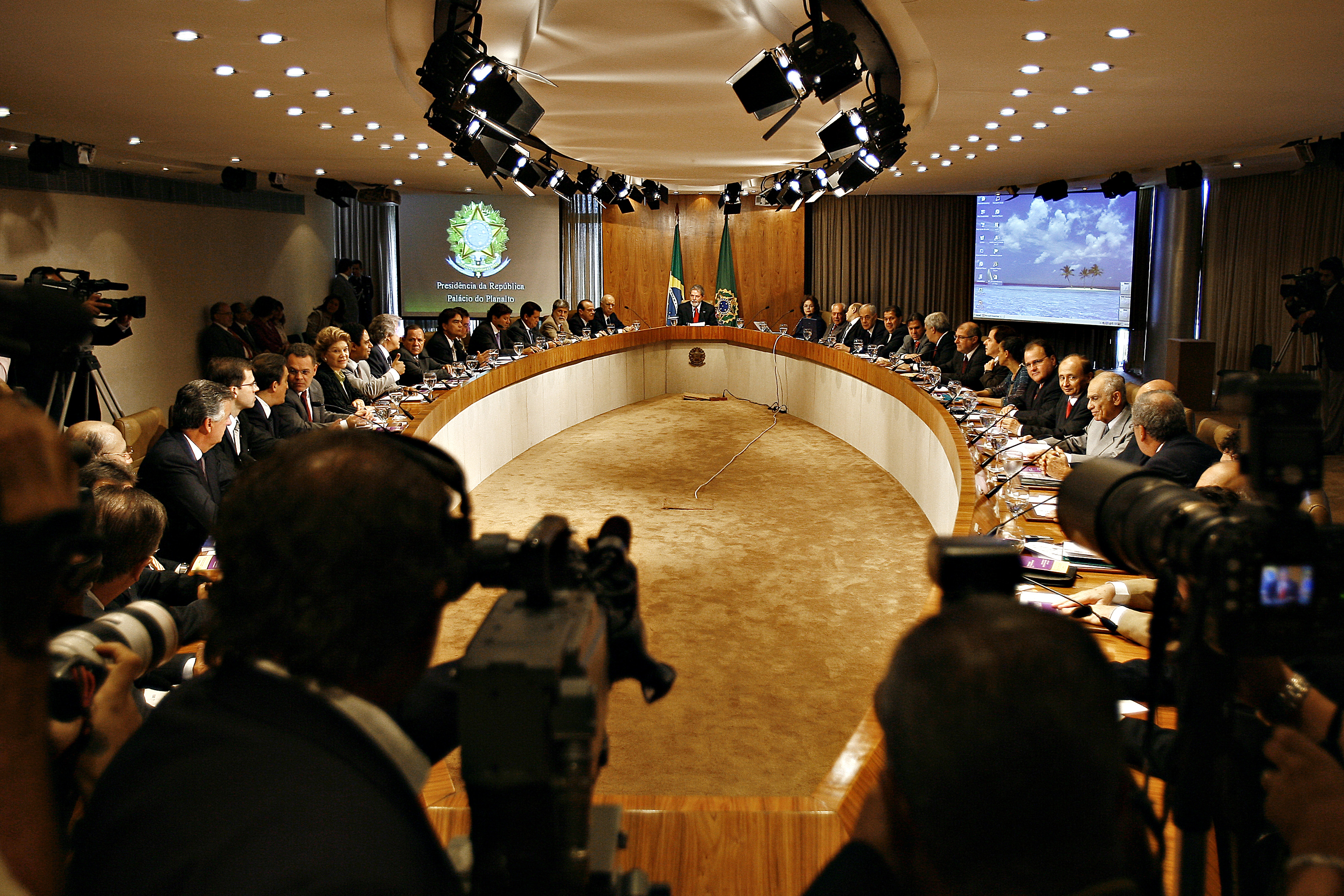
Meeting of the Cabinet of Luiz Inácio Lula da Silva in the Oval Room, Palácio do Planalto, 2007

The deforestation rate in Brazil declined significantly during Lula's first time in office, a decline that reversed in the time of Bolsonaro.

In 2002, at his fourth attempt, Lula was elected president. In part his victory was derived from the significant unpopularity of Cardoso's second term, which failed to address economic inequality, and to an extent from a softening of his and the party's radical stance, including a vice-presidential candidate from the Liberal Party, acceptance of an International Monetary Fund (IMF) agreement from the previous government administration, and a line of discourse friendly to the financial markets.

Despite some achievements in solving part of the country's biggest problems, his term was plagued by multiple corruption scandals that rocked his cabinet, forcing some members to resign their posts.

In 2006 Lula regained part of his popularity and ran for re-election. After almost winning on the first round, he won the run-off against Geraldo Alckmin from the Brazilian Social Democracy Party (PSDB), by a margin of 20 million votes.

In 2010, Lula's handpicked successor, Dilma Rousseff, was elected to the Presidency.

=== Rousseff government (2011–2016) ===
In 2011, Rousseff became the first woman to be elected president of Brazil.

In 2015 and 2016, many demonstrations were held against Rousseff demanding for her to be impeached because of corruption scandals. According to studies by the Brazilian Institute of Public Opinion and Statistics (Ibope), 70-80% of demonstrators questioned supported harsher sentences for criminal offences, and a reduction of the age of criminal responsibility to 16. Between 2010 and 2016, support for the death penalty increased from 31% to 49%, and the number of people declaring themselves conservative from 49% to 59%.

The decline in poverty and the development of the middle class during the Lula years also allowed right-wing parties to address broader segments of the electorate on economic issues. "The new lower middle class dream of being entrepreneurs and consumers" according to the Perseu Abramo Foundation. "They are very sensitive to the meritocracy rhetoric of the right and the evangelical churches, and less affected by the PT message, which is still aimed at the poor".

=== Second Lula government (2023–present) ===
The second presidency of Luiz Inácio Lula da Silva started on 1 January 2023, when he was inaugurated as the 39th President of Brazil. he was elected for a third term as President of Brazil on 30 October 2022, by obtaining 50.9% of the valid votes in the 2022 Brazilian general election.

== Political corruption ==
=== Operação Lava Jato (Operation Car Wash) ===
This was a set of investigations carried out by the Federal Police of Brazil, aimed at investigating a money laundering scheme that involved billions of reals in bribes. It resulted in more than a thousand search and seizure warrants, temporary arrests, preventive detentions and bench warrants. The operation started on March 17, 2014, and had 71 operational phases authorized, among others, by the then judge Sérgio Moro, during which more than one hundred people were arrested and convicted. It investigated crimes of active and passive corruption, fraudulent management, money laundering, criminal organization, obstruction of justice, fraudulent exchange operation and receipt of undue advantage. According to investigations and awarded claims, administrative members of the state-owned oil company Petrobras, politicians from the largest parties in Brazil, including presidents of the Republic, presidents of the Chamber of Deputies and the Senate, and state governors, as well as businessmen from large Brazilian companies, were involved. The Federal Police considers it the largest corruption investigation in the country's history.

== Political issues ==
An opinion poll found the most important political issues in 2026 were health care, public security, economy, corruption and education.

Brazil is one of the most dangerous countries for militant farmworkers, with sixty-five murders of farmworkers engaged in conflicts over the right to land in 2017 alone. Between 1985 and 2017, 1,722 activists of the Landless Workers' Movement were murdered.

In 2016, at least 49 people were murdered in Brazil defending the environment against companies or landowners.

== International organization participation ==
- African Development Bank
- Customs Cooperation Council
- United Nations Economic Commission for Latin America and the Caribbean
- Food and Agriculture Organization
- Group of Eleven
- Group of 15
- Group of 19
- Group of 24
- Group of 77
- Inter-American Development Bank
- International Atomic Energy Agency
- International Bank for Reconstruction and Development (World Bank)
- International Civil Aviation Organization
- International Chamber of Commerce
- International Criminal Court
- International Red Cross and Red Crescent Movement
- International Development Association
- International Fund for Agricultural Development
- International Finance Corporation
- International Federation of Red Cross and Red Crescent Societies
- International Hydrographic Organization
- International Labour Organization
- International Monetary Fund
- International Maritime Organization
- Inmarsat
- International Telecommunications Satellite Organization
- Interpol
- International Olympic Committee
- International Organization for Migration (observer)
- International Organization for Standardization
- International Telecommunication Union
- International Trade Union Confederation
- Latin American Economic System
- Asociación Latinoamericana de Integración
- Mercosur, Non-Aligned Movement (observer)
- Nuclear Suppliers Group
- Organization of American States
- Agency for the Prohibition of Nuclear Weapons in Latin America and the Caribbean
- Organisation for the Prohibition of Chemical Weapons
- Permanent Court of Arbitration
- Rio Group
- United Nations
- United Nations Conference on Trade and Development
- United Nations Educational, Scientific, and Cultural Organization
- Union of South American Nations
- United Nations High Commissioner for Refugees
- United Nations Industrial Development Organization
- United Nations Mission of Observers in Prevlaka
- United Nations Transitional Administration in East Timor
- United Nations University
- Universal Postal Union
- World Federation of Trade Unions
- World Health Organization
- World Intellectual Property Organization
- World Meteorological Organization
- World Tourism Organization
- World Trade Organization

== See also ==
- Censorship in Brazil
- Third wave of autocratization
