= Third Way in Brazil =

Brazilian centrist political ideology

Third Way (Portuguese: Terceira via) politics have been used to describe many types of Brazilian political groups, predominantly in the political center. Stemming from the Brazilian Social Democracy Party, the Third Way movement in Brazil saw its height during the presidency of Fernando Henrique Cardoso. In modern Brazilian politics, the term is more commonly used for politics in opposition or unaligned with the dominant forces of the left-wing Workers' Party and those of Jair Bolsonaro.

== Term ==
The Third Way has been advocated by its proponents as a "radical-centrist" alternative to both capitalism and what it regards as the traditional forms of socialism, including Marxian and state socialism. It advocates ethical socialism, reformism and gradualism that includes advocating the humanisation of capitalism, a mixed economy, political pluralism and liberal democracy.

== History ==
=== Origin ===
The Third Way in Brazil began with the foundation of the Brazilian Social Democracy Party (PSDB) in 1988.

Founded by Mário Covas and Fernando Henrique Cardoso (FHC), as an intellectual minority of the Brazilian Democratic Movement, the PSDB emerged as a party of urbanites and educated voters, supportive of democracy but concerned with political radicalism.

The party stated that it "reject[s] populism and authoritarianism, as well as both fundamentalist neoliberalism and obsolete national-statism". Its manifesto preached "democracy as a fundamental value" and "social justice as an aim to be reached". In its foundation, the party attempted to unite political groups as diverse as social democrats, social liberals, Christian democrats and democratic socialists.

The ideas of the party, though associated with the neoliberalism, were opposed to the populism of Fernando Collor de Mello in the 1989 Brazilian presidential election. Collor's election on a campaign of economic liberalization through privatization attempted to create greater economic equality.

After the Impeachment of Fernando Collor, President Itamar Franco appointed Cardoso Minister of Finance, implementing the Plano Real to combat hyperinflation. The success of this program saw Cardoso elected president in the first round in 1994.

=== Split ===
The electoral success of Cardoso created an eventual split between the more economically statist and market forces in the movement. Cardoso's administration deepened the privatization program launched by president Fernando Collor de Mello.

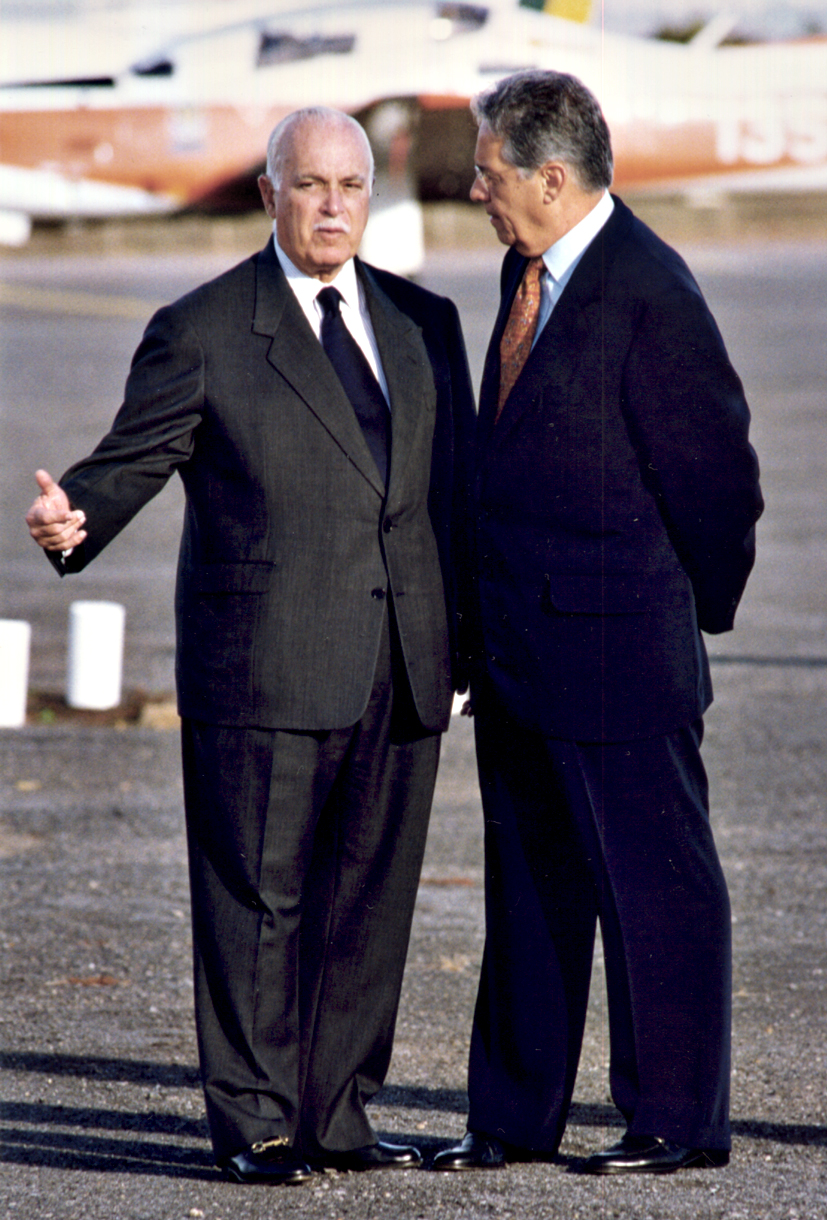
Cardoso (right) allied with political patriarchs like Antônio Carlos Magalhães (left) who engaged in clientelism and cronyism

During his first term, several government-owned enterprises in areas such as steel milling, telecommunications and mining, such as Telebras and Companhia Vale do Rio Doce were sold to the private sector, the deepest denationalisation in Brazilian history, amidst a polarized political debate between "neoliberals" and "developmentalists".

==== Left-wing opposition ====
These economic interventionists, most notably the previous president Franco and Ciro Gomes, Cardoso's successor as Finance Minister, led to some of the mantle of the third way moving to other parties such as Brazilian Democratic Movement and the Popular Socialist Party. Gomes, who ran against Cardoso in 1998, expressed dissatisfaction with the institutionalization of corruption, saying that "“Fernando Henrique does not steal, but lets others steal."

==== Tolerance of the Centrão ====
Cardoso was accused of tolerating the corruption of Brazil's large centrist parties, the Centrão, to get his policies approved.

Many of the companies privatized, which had been set up by the military dictatorship during the so-called Brazilian Miracle, were sold to the same military officials who had previously operated them leading to many accusations of corruption and cronyism. These sales have been observed to further the clientelism in Brazilian politics and the promotion of Coronelism in Brazil's Northeast.

===== Vote buying =====
Later in his term, the government's opposition, led by the PT, began to accuse Fernando Henrique Cardoso of purchasing the votes of members of parliament. He claimed that several politicians benefited from the amendment, as governors and mayors could also be re-elected, and that the wiretaps revealed the involvement of a governor and his deputies, not the federal government. The case was investigated by the Constitution, Justice and Citizenship Committee (Comissão de Constituição e Justiça e de Cidadania), whose session lasted only a few hours; it was addressed years later by the Mensalão CPI. After the investigation, deputies Ronivon Santiago and João Maia resigned their seats, supposedly to avoid being impeached. In both circumstances, Fernando Henrique Cardoso's involvement could not be proven.

=== Lulism ===
After three failed attempts for the presidency, former syndicalist Luiz Inácio Lula da Silva attempted to capture the Third Way in the 2002 election through alliances with pro-business parties and the appointment of executive José Alencar as vice president. Against Cardoso's Health Minister José Serra, Lula won a decisive victory, and implemented many of the economic positions of the developmentalist Third Way. Lulism "concocted new ideological, under-union banners that seemed to combine" continuity of the Lula and Cardoso governments in macroeconomic policy based on three pillars, namely inflation control, a floating exchange rate and a budgetary surplus.

==== Polarization ====
These embraces of previous PSDB policy forced the party towards the right, creating a two-party system from 2006 to 2014, where the third way was viewed as an option other than Lula's Workers' Party or the PSDB.

=== Marina Silva ===
Marina Silva, the former environment minister of Lula, emerged as the primary challenge to the PT and PSDB duopoly in national politics in the early 2010s. Originally from Acre, she opposed the developmentalism of the Brazilian military dictatorship and the neo-developmentalism of the PT administrations, but also supported business regulation, due to her environmentalism. Her particular appeal was to evangelicals, being the second evangelical candidate to achieve the top three in a Brazilian election.

Silva, who achieved third place in the 2010 and 2014 elections, prioritized sustainable development and fiscal responsibility. Like many of the third way, her appeal was to unify ideological factions rather than an ideological line. In the 2018 elections, Jair Bolsonaro usurped her evangelical support base and in the 2022 elections, she joined the Lulist Broad Front.

=== Opposition to Bolsonaro ===
With the emergence of Jair Bolsonaro, the position of the Third Way in Brazilian politics returned to the Brazilian Social Democracy Party and its allies. Its candidate in 2018, Geraldo Alckmin, failed to gain traction, but in 2022, the primary Third Way candidate, Simone Tebet, achieved third place.

== Economic views ==
=== Relationship to neoliberalism ===
While opposed to strident neoliberalism, as supported by the failed reforms of the Collor administration, right-leaning members of the third-way movement are committed to free trade without ideological stridency and an emphasis on exports. The economic policy of the Cardoso administration was largely responsive to inflation and crisis rather than constructive new systems.

In modern Brazil, supporters of these views are often more urban and educated voters who advantage of economic liberalism but oppose social conservatism. A base of this support can be found in São Paulo, where the PSDB has a significant historical impact.

=== Opposition to developmentalism ===
Developmentalism first emerged in Brazil through the military dictatorship and has been continued through left-wing governments. Opposition to government control of business, whether that of right-wing or left-wing governments, in common among third-way movements.

=== Economic policies ===
Depending on the political movement, the economic approaches of Third Way politicians vary.

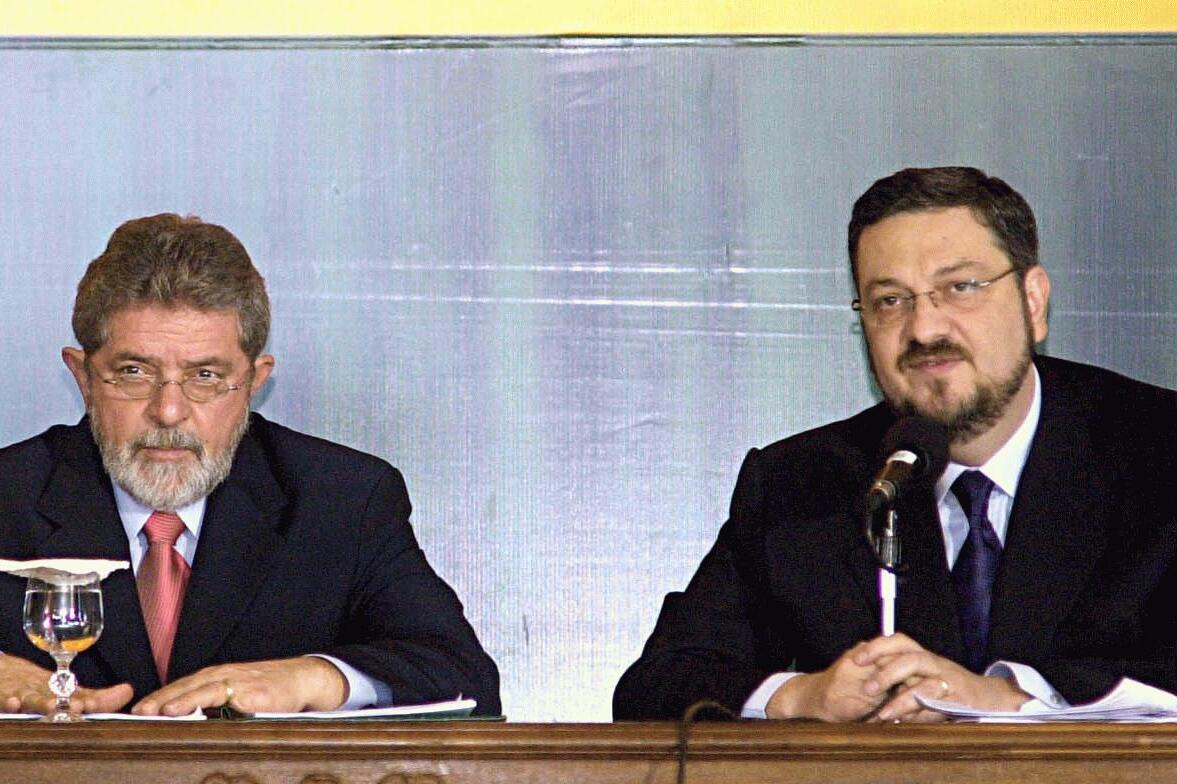
Lula (left) with his Finance Minister Antonio Palocci (right)

==== Lulism ====
The political position of Lulism has been described as conciliatory to the two views of economic theory in Brazil. Rather than opposing free markets, the goal of the policy was to combine a social focus on government-sponsored development rather than regulation, as seen with European social democracy. The description of this challenge was laid out by left-wing detractors opposed to markets and developmentalism such as Plínio de Arruda Sampaio Jr. who wrote in 2012, describing Lulism as neo-developmentalism:

The challenge of neodevelopmentalism is therefore to reconcile the “positive” aspects of neoliberalism—unconditional commitment to currency stability, fiscal austerity, the pursuit of international competitiveness, and the absence of any discrimination against international capital—and the “positive” aspects of old developmentalism—commitment to economic growth, industrialization, the regulatory role of the state, and social sensitivity.

Lulism emerged as conciliatory to market forces in Lula's first term but from 2006 onwards, the Workers' Party took a more ideologically leftist stance, especially under Lula's successor Rousseff.

==== Social liberalism ====
The policy priorities of the Third Way have shifted towards social justice via market forces. Groups like Livres support politicians that prioritize feminist and socially liberal economic policies.

== Political parties ==
The following parties broadly identify with the Third Way as a whole while other parties may have factions that identify with the political identity.

Name	Leader	Ideology
Brazilian Social Democracy Party	Marconi Perillo	Liberalism Center
Podemos	Renata Abreu	Direct democracy Center-right
Citizenship	Comte Bittencourt	Social liberalism Center

== See also ==
- Third Way
- Third Way in Germany
- Third Way in the United States
- Politics of Brazil
