= Nixonomics =

U.S. economy under Nixon's presidency

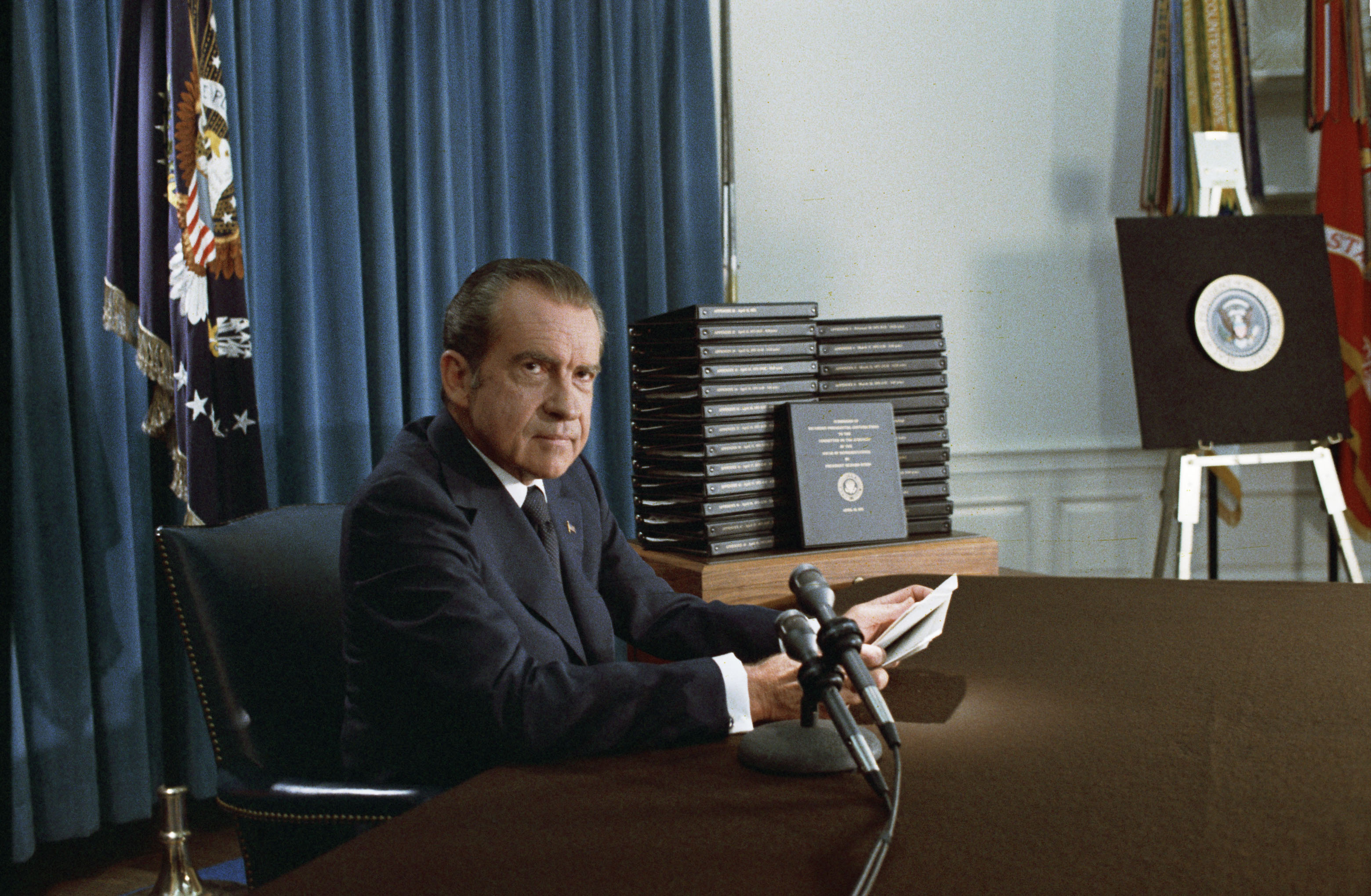
President Richard Nixon

Nixonomics, a portmanteau of the words "Nixon" and "economics", refers either to the performance of the U.S. economy under U.S. President Richard Nixon (i.e. the expansions in 1969 and from 1970 to 1973 during the broader Post–World War II economic expansion and the recessions from 1969 to 1970 and from 1973 to 1975) or the Nixon administration's economic policies. Nixon is the first president to have his surname combined with the word "economics".

Nixon won a weak economy from President Lyndon B. Johnson. In 1969, a tax bill passed that held several Nixon ideas, including a repeal of the investment tax credit and removal of two million of the nation's poor from the tax rolls. After a year it was becoming obvious that the plan wasn't working. Nixon gave his budget plan to congress in 1971 in which he was to use a $11.6 billion deficit. Nixon then publicly agreed with Keynesian economic principles which stated that government expenditure could take the nation out of their recession, which was a considerably unusual view for a Republican president.

Arthur F. Burns, Nixon's appointee to chair the Federal Reserve, shifted away from a tight-money policy because the nation's unemployment was sharply rising as was inflation. In the early months of 1971, Nixon started criticizing the growing wages in the steel industry, so he created the Tripartite Committee to keep a closer watch on the construction industry. Treasury Secretary John Connally announced that the government would need to start taking new measures. Despite this, unemployment had reached 6 percent.

In August the government had made a new plan for the economy with rather extreme measures, measures which would later be dubbed "Nixon Shocks". The plan was announced on August 15, 1971 in a national televised address. Nixon declared that the gold window would be closed and that gold would no longer be transferable to US dollars. This created an 8 percent devaluation to the dollar, as compared to other major currencies of the time, stimulating American exports and the domestic economy. A 90-day freeze on wages and prices and the establishment of the cost-of-living council was also announced. He neglected to inform any allies beforehand, causing some problems between the countries.

By 1972, unemployment had continued to rise, with 2 million more Americans out of jobs than in 1969. The administration decided it was time to stimulate the economy with a $25.2 billion budget. In the election year, the money supply was expanded by 9 percent. This caused many to accuse Nixon and Burns of making a deal so that Nixon could win the upcoming election and Burns to keep his government position. Both men denied the accusation.

By the fall of 1972, the economy began to improve. Unemployment was finally dropping and inflation was staying relatively in control. America had temporarily gotten out of the recession. Inflation soon increased after the election. When the failed wage and price controls were lifted, other problems took their toll on the American economy. An expanded money supply, the effects of increased deficits and the rising price of oil all left their mark on the American economy. By 1973 inflation increased 8.8 percent, then 12.2 percent in the following year.

== Other presidential "-omics" ==
- The New Deal
- Carternomics
- Reaganomics
- Clintonomics
- Bushonomics
- Obamanomics
- Trumponomics
- Bidenomics
