= Alfred Müller-Armack =

German economist and politician (1901–1978)

- Formal portrait, 1959
- Born: 28 June 1901; Essen, German Empire
- Died: 16 March 1978 (aged 76); Cologne, West Germany

Academic work
- School or tradition: Ordoliberalism

Alfred Müller-Armack (28 June 1901 – 16 March 1978) was a German economist, politician, professor and sociologist who coined the term "social market economy" in 1946.

Born in Essen, Müller-Armack was professor of economics at University of Münster and University of Cologne. He was a central figure of the "Cologne school". He always pointed out that the economy had to serve humanity. A regulatory environment should provide the basis for a form of competition that was to the best for all people.

Müller-Armack's 1929 article Supplement to the Handbook of Political Science received attention for its discussion of the business cycle. While he published a book titled Ideas of the State and Economy Order in the New Reich in 1933 which contained some praise of Nazism, the Nazis did not like the book and a second edition was refused in 1935. He worked as an advisor to the Nazi government and the German army, and contributed to discussions about the post-war economic order. When he became more and more disillusioned with the Nazi regime, he withdrew to his academic research and turned towards religious sociological studies. This resulted in a big volume entitled "Das Jahrhundert ohne Gott" (Century without God), published in 1948.

After the war, he joined the CDU and he coined the phrase “Social Market Economy” in his book “Wirtschaftslenkung und Marktwirtschaft” (Economic Steering and Market Economy), written in 1946 and published in 1947. In his understanding, the Social Market Economy combined the power and dynamism of a free market economy with a limited social equilibration and social security system. In 1950, he got a position as full professor at the University of Cologne.

Müller-Armack was a member of the Mont Pelerin Society an organization of free market economists and classical liberal thinkers established by Friedrich Hayek although Müller-Armack was less libertarian oriented than Hayek.

After 1952, he worked in the Federal Ministry for Economic Affairs under Ludwig Erhard (CDU) as section chief of the newly founded policy department (Grundsatzabteilung). In 1953, he participated in negotiations in Rome to establish a European political community. From 1958 to 1963 he was Europa-Staatssekretär, (Under-)Secretary of State for European Affairs, in the ministry. The failure of the negotiations for the United Kingdom to join the European Economic Community prompted his resignation that became effective in late 1963.

He returned to the University of Cologne as a professor of economics and sociology where he continued to teach until his retirement in 1970. During this time, he published Religion und Wirtschaft: Geistesgeschichtliche Hintergründe unserer europäischen Lebensform [Religion and Economy: An Intellectual and Historical Background of our European Way of Life] in 1959, a work in the sociology of religion.

Besides his academic and political activities, he held several business positions like member of the board of the European Investment Bank (EIB) and chairman of the board for the Rheinischen Stahlwerke (Rhenish steel works) in the 1960s and 1970s.

In 1971 he published his memoirs with the title „Auf dem Weg nach Europa“ (On the way towards Europe). His final written article which was not published until several months after his death was entitled The Social Market Economy as an Economic and Social Order.
