= Terror and Liberalism =

2003 book by Paul Berman

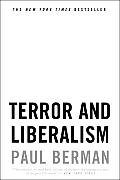
- Author: Paul Berman
- Language: English
- Subject: Islamism, liberal internationalism, totalitarianism
- Genre: Non-fiction
- Publisher: W. W. Norton & Company
- Publication place: United States

Terror and Liberalism is a non-fiction book by American political philosopher and writer Paul Berman. He published the work through W. W. Norton & Company in April 2003. Berman asserts that modern Islamist groups such as al Qaeda share fundamental ideological elements with fascism and other 20th-century Western totalitarian movements, and he defends an assertive approach to root out this extremist thinking across the world. He details the appeal of violent terror, going back to Albert Camus' work The Rebel, first published in 1951. Berman hypothesizes that the spread of democracy in the Arab world, while highly difficult and involving a long struggle, is a fundamentally just cause, and he writes in support of the George W. Bush administration's foreign policies while also faulting President Bush for credibility problems and incompetence.

The book received a wide variety of reviews. Salon.com ran a review that described the work as "an important entry in the debate over the meaning of 9/11 and after". Author Sam Harris praised the work in Harris' own book The End of Faith, which also discussed jihadist terrorism. Washington Monthly journalist Joshua Micah Marshall particularly remarked that "Berman's book is by turns penetrating, insightful, honest, sloppy, erudite, superficial, hot-blooded, serious, and florid."

== Contents ==
Berman begins the book with a discussion of the September 11 attacks of 2001. He then details the ideology of Sayyid Qutb, an influential figure behind the development of Islamism, before moving on to a general overview of suicidal Islamic extremist violence that preceded the World Trade Center attacks. He purports to have discerned various surprising links from forgotten European intellectuals to these emerging political theologies, as in the case of Physiology and Medicine Nobelist Alexis Carrel. Berman then argues against the two popular views that the success of groups such as al Qaeda are either, first, the lashing out of the socially oppressed or, second, an alien, distant product of a Muslim people with fundamentally anti-Western religious beliefs and values.

Berman discusses the socio-cultural origins of fascism in modern Europe as well as the culmination of its ideals in the Holocaust and the Second World War. He also details the growth of Islamic extremist thinking, comparing and contrasting it with early 20th century revolutionary movements, and he states that the Islamic extremist struggle with liberal, pluralistic democracies is an outgrowth of that past trend. He uses the term "Muslim totalitarianism" as a shorthand summary of his thinking.

In terms of individual Islamic terrorists and their cells, Berman draws upon the writings of Albert Camus and concurs with Camus' musing that "the sinister excites" and the "transgressions of suicide or murder arouse a thrill that sometimes takes an overtly sexual form." He discusses militant attacks as a kind of emotional anti-rationalism that is both primal and very difficult for normal, modern people to comprehend. He additionally stresses the importance of staying strong against authoritarian extremists, arguing in support of assertive, preemptive war as well as active police efforts to root out the radicals within Muslim states themselves as well as in Western countries.

He praises the decisions to launch the invasion of Afghanistan and invasion of Iraq. Berman, describing his overall view of the present danger, writes,

The whole of the Muslim world has been overwhelmed by German philosophies from long ago, the philosophies of revolutionary nationalism and totalitarianism, cannily translated into Muslim dialects. Let the Germans go door to door throughout the region, issuing a product recall.

As mentioned before, Berman hypothesizes that the spread of democracy in the Arab world, while highly difficult and involving a long struggle, is a fundamentally just cause. He writes in support of the George W. Bush administration's foreign policies, but he also condemns the President for credibility problems and incompetence, particularly how Berman thinks the Christian religious fundamentalism of Bush's domestic agenda undermines Bush's claims to support liberal democracy against militant Islamic fundamentalism. Berman argues in broad terms, though, "Freedom for others means safety for ourselves".

== Reviews and responses ==
American atheist author Sam Harris cited Berman's book in his own work The End of Faith, which explored the same themes regarding jihadist terrorism and the nature of modern liberal democracy. Harris praised Berman's writing as providing a "beautiful primer on totalitarianism". Journalist and author Michael J. Totten has approvingly quoted from Berman's arguments and praised the work as a "brilliant book".

The Observer ran a mixed review by journalist Martin Bright. Bright supported some of the points made while also stating that, at times, "Berman trips over the ingenuity of his own argument". Bright also remarked, "Berman's description of a paranoid 'people of God' convinced of its own righteousness, prepared to kill its enemies and sacrifice its own in pursuit of a realm of pure truth might just as easily apply to the United States".

Ellen Willis wrote for Salon that while Berman was correct in criticizing the repressive and inhumane policies of secular dictators such as Saddam Hussein and Islamic fundamentalist groups, Berman was deeply wrong in his praise for the Bush administration's foreign policies. More broadly, she stated that she saw the book as "an important entry in the debate over the meaning of 9/11 and after".

Washington Monthly ran a mixed review by journalist Joshua Micah Marshall, who commented that "Berman's book is by turns penetrating, insightful, honest, sloppy, erudite, superficial, hot-blooded, serious, and florid." Marshall also wrote, "Though this is a serious book, it is shot through with an equally serious flaw: the desire to inflate the threat of Islamist violence—and particularly its intellectual stakes—to levels beyond what they merit and to force them into a template of an earlier era, for which Berman has an evident and understandable nostalgia. Over the course of the book, the disjointedness between what the radical Islamist menace is and what Berman wants to make it ranges from merely apparent to downright painful, and ends up obscuring as much as it clarifies. And, unfortunately, the obscuring elements may be the more important ones. Given the role intellectuals are playing in this war, these are mistakes that could have dire real-world costs.

== See also ==
- Islamic fundamentalism
- Islamic terrorism
- Islamism
- Foreign policy of the George W. Bush administration
- Liberal hawk
- Liberal internationalism
- The Rebel
