= Cold War liberal =

Liberal politicians and labor union leaders who supported democracy and equality

Cold War liberal is a term that was used in the United States during the Cold War, which began after the end of World War II. The term was used to describe liberal politicians and labor union leaders who supported democracy and equality. They supported the growth of labor unions, the civil rights movement, and the War on Poverty and simultaneously opposing totalitarianism commonly seen under Communist rule at the time. Cold War liberals supported efforts of containment, such as diplomat George F. Kennan and U.S. president Harry S. Truman during the post-World War II era, towards Soviet Communism. The term can still be used today however it is not as common.

== Background and overview ==
Modern American liberalism of the Cold War era was the immediate heir to Franklin D. Roosevelt's New Deal and the slightly more distant heir to the Progressive Era of the early 20th century. Sol Stern wrote that "Cold War liberalism deserves credit for the greatest American achievement since World War II—winning the Cold War." The essential tenets of Cold War liberalism can be found in Roosevelt's Four Freedoms (1941); of these, freedom of speech and freedom of religion were classic American liberal freedoms, as was freedom from fear (freedom from tyrannical government), but freedom from want was another matter. Roosevelt proposed a notion of freedom that went beyond government non-interference in private lives. Freedom from want could justify positive government action to meet economic needs, a concept more associated with the concepts of Abraham Lincoln's Republican Party, Henry Clay's Whig Party, and Alexander Hamilton's economic principles of government intervention and subsidy than the more radical socialism and social democracy of European thinkers, or with prior versions of classical radicalism and classical liberalism as represented by Thomas Jefferson's Democratic-Republican Party and Andrew Jackson's Democratic Party.

In the 1950s and the 1960s, both major American political parties included liberal and conservative factions. The Democratic Party had two wings: Northern and Western liberals opposed the generally-conservative Southern whites. Difficult to classify were the northern urban Democratic political machines. They had supported New Deal economic policies but would slowly come apart over racial issues. Some historians have divided the Republican Party into the liberal Wall Street and the conservative Main Street factions; others have said that the party's conservatives came from landlocked states (Robert A. Taft of Ohio and Barry Goldwater of Arizona) and the liberals tended to come from California (Earl Warren and Pete McCloskey), New York (Nelson Rockefeller), and other coastal states.

Opposing both Soviet Communism and conservatism, Cold War liberalism resembled earlier liberalisms in its views on many social issues and personal liberty but its economic views were not those of free-market Jeffersonian liberalism or those of European social democrats. Although they never endorsed state socialism, they called for spending on education, science, and infrastructure, notably the expansion of NASA and the construction of the Interstate Highway System. Their progressivist ideas continued the legacy of Lincoln, Woodrow Wilson, Theodore Roosevelt, and Franklin D. Roosevelt.

Most prominent and constant among the positions of Cold War liberalism were support for a domestic economy built on a balance of power between labor (in the form of organized trade unions) and management (with a tendency to be more interested in large corporations than in small business); a foreign policy focused on containing the Eastern Bloc, which according to some was one factor leading to the dissolution of the Soviet Union at the end of 1991; the continuation and expansion of New Deal social welfare programs (in the broad sense of welfare, including programs like Social Security); and an embrace of Keynesian economics. By way of compromise with political groupings to their right, this often became in practice military Keynesianism.

At first, liberals generally did not see Franklin D. Roosevelt's successor Harry S. Truman as one of their own and viewed him as a Democratic Party hack. Other liberal politicians and liberal organizations, such as the Americans for Democratic Action (ADA), sided with Truman in opposing Communism both at home and abroad, sometimes by sacrificing civil liberties. At the same time, the ADA succeeded in pushing Truman leftward on issues like the civil rights movement. Hubert Humphrey was a liberal leader who fought to uphold Truman's veto of the McCarran Act of 1950. Liberals were united in their opposition to McCarthyism. Truman would call Joseph McCarthy "the greatest asset the Kremlin has" by "torpedo[ing] the bipartisan foreign policy of the United States." The Truman Doctrine was an American foreign policy with the primary goal of containing Soviet expansion during the Cold War.

== Notable Cold War liberals ==
Some notable pioneers of Cold War liberalism included Harry S. Truman, John F. Kennedy, and Lyndon B. Johnson. World War II ended under Truman, while Johnson succeeded to the presidency after the assassination of Kennedy. Johnson was greatly supported by the Democratic Party, and as president he was responsible for designing the Great Society legislation for civil rights, public broadcasting, Medicare, Medicaid, environmental protection, aid to education (Elementary and Secondary Education Act), and his War on Poverty. Johnson was renowned for his domineering personality and the Johnson treatment, his coercion of powerful politicians in order to advance legislation. All of his accomplishments were influenced by the idea of Cold War liberalism. which was according to most implemented by Kennedy.

Henry M. Jackson, first a representative and then senator from Washington state, is widely recognized as a Cold War liberal. A Democrat, his political beliefs were characterized by support of civil rights, human rights, and safeguarding the environment; he had an equally-strong commitment to oppose totalitarianism in general, particularly Soviet Communism. Jackson and his legacy are acknowledged as having significant influence on neoconservatism. Zbigniew Brzezinski, Jimmy Carter's National Security Adviser, was a liberal Democrat and a committed anti-communist, favoring social justice while seeing world events in substantially Cold War terms. According to Foreign Policy, "Brzezinski’s outlook was anti-Soviet, but he also insisted, like George Kennan before him, on the necessity of cultivating a strong West."

=== John F. Kennedy ===
John F. Kennedy is regarded by some as one of the key players that revived liberalism and was the most influential liberal of the time. During his campaign, Kennedy took the liberal approach by promising voters to revive liberalism, which had withered under Dwight D. Eisenhower, with a new set of reforms collectively called the New Frontier. Kennedy wanted to expand Social Security to benefit more Americans, help the elderly pay their medical costs, fund educational endeavors, raise the national minimum wage, and reduce income inequality. In his famous inaugural address, Kennedy appealed to American youth by instructing them to "ask not what your country can do for you; ask what you can do for your country". He later launched the Peace Corps to support this effort, encouraging young Americans to assist people in developing countries. He also responded to national fears and pressures regarding the Space Race against the Soviet Union by challenging Americans to put a man on the moon by the end of the decade. His enthusiasm spread across the country. He sought to reform economic issues along with issues of the humanities, which is what paved the way for the future of liberalism. To improve relations with Latin America and guard against pro-Soviet regimes, Kennedy supported the Alliance for Progress, which over ten years provided billions of dollars in foreign aid to Latin American countries, encouraging economic cooperation, and aiming to reduce economic inequality in those countries through land reform. The alliance succeeded in some of its goals but faced limitations in its political goals.

=== Cold War liberalism and conservatism ===
In the 1970s, Richard Nixon, Gerald Ford, and Jimmy Carter pursued a relative reduction of Cold War tensions through linkage policy and triangular diplomacy, while continuing to pressure the Soviet Union in key areas. The Carter Doctrine, which sought to oppose Soviet expansion toward the Persian Gulf, was expanded and altered by the Reagan Doctrine. As the United States president in the 1980s, Ronald Reagan believed that the United States should combat Communism more directly. He regarded the previous detentes, or the easing of strained relations between the United States and the Soviet Union, a sign of vulnerability. In 1991, two years after Reagan left office, the Cold War ended. His policies of preserving peace through strength and promoting advancement of democracy around the world had gained him significant foreign policy credibility. The American conservative Reagan supported liberal democracy as a system compared to the authoritarian Soviet system, and his policies supported a grand strategy consistent with pressuring the Soviet Union.

== See also ==
- Coalition for a Democratic Majority
- Liberal hawk
- Liberal internationalism

== Bibliography ==
- Faulks, Keith. Political sociology: a critical introduction. Edinburgh: Edinburgh University Press, 1999.
- Fernbach, Alfred and Bishko, Charles Julian, Charting Democracy in America (1995)
- Frost, Bryan-Paul and Sikkenga, Jeffrey (2003). History of American Political Thought. Lexington Books. p. 33.
- Hamby, Alonzo L., Liberalism and Its Challengers: From F.D.R. to Bush (1992)
- McCoy, Donald R. (1984). The Presidency of Harry S. Truman. Lawrence, KS: University Press of Kansas. ISBN 978-0-7006-0252-0.
- Schlesinger, Arthur, "Liberalism in America: A Note for Europeans", in The Politics of Hope, (1962)
