= Michael Saba =

Democratic member of the South Dakota House of Representatives

Michael Saba (born c. 1941) was a Democratic member of the South Dakota House of Representatives, representing District 9. He was elected November 6, 2018, when he placed second in a three-way race for two legislative seats against Republican candidates Deb Peters and Michael Clark, narrowly defeating Clark by 67 votes.

Saba served one term of office, and was defeated in the November 3, 2020, election by Republicans Rhonda Milstead and Bethany Soye.

After graduating from Minot State in 1965 with degrees in biology and teacher education, he joined the Peace Corps which was then newly formed by John F. Kennedy. His father is from Lebanon, and Saba was the executive director of the National Association of Arab-Americans in the early 1970s. While working in the Middle East as a liaison for Western oil companies and local governments, Saba was in Baghdad during the run up to the Gulf War and was, along with a number of other westerners, prevented from leaving the country by the Iraqi government. After a ten-day detainment at a hotel, he and another hostage hired a taxi and escaped in an eight-hour ride to the Jordanian border.

== The Armageddon Network ==
The Armageddon Network is a non-fiction book by Saba about possible espionage in the United States government for the state of Israel. The author sheds light on a handful of U.S. government officials seemingly using their positions to benefit Israel. The title, The Armageddon Network, refers to this group of people and the possible threat they pose to "U.S. national security and world peace".

On March 9, 1978, Michael Saba was waiting to meet someone in the coffee shop of the Madison Hotel in Washington D.C.. As he sat reading a newspaper, the three Hebrew-speaking men, later identified as Israeli officials, sitting at an adjacent table were joined by a fourth who was introduced as "Stephen Bryen of the Senate Foreign Relations Committee". What he overheard soon led to an FBI investigation, and took Saba "down a path of inquiry which would reveal to me the activities of a small group of influential U.S. policy-makers who used their positions to shape American policy - regardless of the economic and strategic costs - so as to favor the military interests of the Israeli Government."

The conversation between Stephen Bryen and the Israeli officials covered the following subjects:

- The West Bank: Bryen advised the Israelis that to win U.S. support for annexation of the West Bank they should make the case in terms of national security rather than on biblical grounds.
- U.S. armaments and jet fighters: How to prevent Israel's Arab enemies from acquiring them and how to get more for Israel. Bryen advised the Israelis that some sort of bargain in the National Security Council needed to be struck in order to prevent a proposed sale of F-15s to Egypt and Saudi Arabia.
- Israel's capacity to build their own aircraft.
- Military bases: Bryen offered to show the Israelis "the Pentagon document on the bases, which you are welcome to see". This remark would put Bryen under suspicion of passing secret documents to a foreign power and became a primary focus of the following FBI investigation. The document concerned was a titled "DOD Analysis of Saudi Request to Purchase f-15 Fighter Aircraft" and was stamped "Secret -- NoForn" meaning it was secret and not to be shown to foreigners. Among other things, it contained details about the new Saudi Arabian airbase at Tabuk. Bryen eventually admitted to making the offer to the Israelis but claimed he intended only to show them an unclassified summary of the document.

On April 1, 1978, the Associated Press broke the story about Stephen Bryen's meeting with the Israeli officials. Five days later the Washington Post mentioned the affair and noted that Bryen was leaving his position at the Senate Foreign Relations Committee in order to "prepare for his upcoming wedding." Saba is later informed by a reporter that Bryen didn't actually leave his job with the committee until February 9, 1979, when he took a position with the Coalition for a Democratic Majority. Bryen's career up till then had been spent on the Republican side of the aisle.

=== The investigation ===
As the Justice Department investigation into Stephen Bryen continued, Saba took up his own investigation of Stephen Bryen and his colleagues. The Coalition for a Democratic Majority was founded by Senator Henry M. Jackson, Daniel Patrick Moynihan, and other hawkish Democrats. This coalition was home to many public figures who came to be known as neoconservatives who were basically social liberals who favored a high military budgets and interventionist foreign policies in order to benefit Israel.

Bryen's lawyer insisted on many preconditions controlling the subject matter of any questions he would be willing to answer in sworn deposition with the Justice Department. The Justice Department investigators, John Davitt and Joel Lisker, considered these conditions to be too restrictive and, in a memo to their supervisor, Assistant Attorney General of the Criminal Division, Philip Heymann, said "we urge strongly" completing the inquiry before an investigative grand jury. The memo goes on to state, "Some of the unresolved questions thus far, which suggest that Bryen is (a) gathering classified information for the Israelis, (b) acting as their unregistered foreign agent and (c) lying about it, are as follows: [Following five-and-one-half pages blacked out]".

For the months following Davitt and Lisker's fruitless negotiations with Bryen's attorney to get Bryen to submit to an interview under oath, Phillip B. Heymann appointed Deputy Assistant Attorney General Robert Keuch to take over for them. Bryen's attorney continued to insist that, among other things, Justice Department investigators be barred from asking Bryen about his relations with the Israel lobby. Eventually, Keuch also failed to come to terms with Bryen's attorney on a sworn deposition of his client. Keuch, like Davitt and Lisker, came to the conclusion that Bryen should be brought before a grand jury. He wrote a memo to Heymann recommending this course of action.

Despite two recommendations to bring the case to a grand jury, Deputy Attorney General Phillip Heymann, after further communications with Bryen's lawyer, decided to allow the suspected foreign agent to go ahead with a sworn deposition instead - a restricted deposition that would bar any questions about any matters beyond those specified by Bryen's lawyer, including Bryen's connections to the Israel lobby.

As Joel Lisker, Chief of the Registration Unit at the Justice Department, turned his attention to the Senate Foreign Relations Committee, he encountered some more difficulties. The Committee counsel, Patrick Shea, demanded he be allowed to attend all interviews of committee staff. A Defense Week article quoted an unnamed source in the Justice Department as saying the presence of the committee lawyer had a chilling effect on the interviewees. Senator Richard Stone, a committee member, insisted on screening all documents investigators requested. Before all the requested documents were received Heymann ordered Lisker to go ahead with the deposition of Stephen Bryan. Stephen Bryen, Bryen's lawyer Nathan Lewin, and his employer Senator Clifford Case of New jersey, and demanded and were granted the right to screen all requested documents and assert privilege over those authored by Bryen or Case.

Heymann insisted Lisker proceed with the deposition prior to being allowed to review the Foreign Relations Committee documents. Apparently Bryen's deposition or a description of it was not included in the many government documents the Saba acquired via FOIA requests, upon which much of The Armageddon Report is based. The Justice Department closed the case in October 1979 before Lisker received any Senate documents or finished deposing Stephen Bryen.

=== Investigation compromised ===
Saba reveals a troubling undisclosed relationship between Phillip Heymann, the deputy attorney general who refused to take the Stephen Bryen case to a grand jury, and Nathan Lewin, Stephen Bryen's attorney. Heymann and Lewin were old friends. Both attended Harvard Law School at the same time where Lewin was editor of the Harvard Law Review for two years prior to Heymann becoming editor while Lewin became treasurer. Heyman clerked for Supreme Court Justice John Harlan from 1960 to 1961 and Lewin clerked for him from 1961 to 1962. In fact both men's careers follow an identical pattern: After the Supreme Court, Heymann joined the Justice Department's Office of Solicitor General and after his stint at the Court, Lewin joined the very same office. Heyman then moved to the State Department's Bureau of Security and Consular Affairs where he became administrator, He was joined by Lewin, who became deputy administrator in 1965. Heymann then went bact to Harvard to teach law, and sure enough Lewin a few years later did the same. Saba cites a source who says when Heymann returned to Washington to work again at the Justice Department in 1978, he stayed as a house guest of Nathan Lewin.

The extensive relationship between Phillip Heymann and Nathan Lewin raises the question of why Heymann did not recuse himself from the Stephen Bryen investigation. The decision not to go to a grand jury and the subsequent concessions made to Nathan Lewin by Heymann reside under the suspicion of undue influence.

=== Post investigation ===
The suspicion of disloyalty cast upon him by the exposure of the meeting in the coffee shop of the Madison Hotel did not seem to do any harm to Bryen's career in government as, after a short stint as executive director of the Jewish Institute for National Security Affairs (JINSA), Bryen took a position as Deputy Assistant Secretary of Defense under Assistant Secretary of Defense for International Security Policy Richard Perle during the Reagan administration. Perle was well known as a Jewish nationalist partisan in the corridors of power in Washington.

Like Bryen, Perle fell under suspicion of spying for Israel when he was caught on an FBI phone tap discussing classified material, evidently supplied to him by Kissinger aide Helmut Sonnenfeldt, with someone in the Israeli embassy. Perle also failed to disclose his work as a consultant for an Israeli arms manufacturer whose fee of fifty thousand dollars he received the same month he started work as Assistant Secretary for International Security Policy at the Pentagon. He then wrote a memo recommending the company as a supplier of mortars.

The National Association of Arab-Americans, for whom Saba once worked, sent letters warning numerous members of Congress and government officials of the security threat Bryen posed. No one on the Senate Armed Services Committee asked about Bryen or Perle's attachment to a certain foreign country in the Levant. After the hearing Senator Jeremiah Denton asked requested in writing that Perle answer several questions regarding the Bryen espionage investigation. Perle denied Bryen's involvement in any espionage and vouched for his loyalty and integrity. Senator James Exon went so far as to place a hold on Perle's confirmation until he could review Bryen's file, but was convinced to lift the hold by other senators.

Richard Perle and Stephen Bryen were confirmed in their Assistant Secretary and Deputy Assistant Secretary positions at the Pentagon on August 3, 1981. One of the investigators who worked the Stephen Bryen case for the Justice Department said:

I was watching the television one night when Bryen came on the screen. I almost fell out of my chair when I saw that he was the Deputy Assistant Secretary of Defense. How in the world could they let that happen?
