= Liberal hawk =

Liberal interventionist

The term "liberal hawk" refers to a politically liberal person (generally, in the American sense of the term) who supports a hawkish, interventionist foreign policy.

== Overview ==
Past U.S. presidents Harry S. Truman, John F. Kennedy, Lyndon B. Johnson and Bill Clinton have been described as liberal hawks for their roles in bringing about America's status as the world's premier military power. The Clinton Doctrine can also be considered as consistent with this vision. Today the term is most frequently used to describe liberals who supported or still support the decision to invade Iraq in 2003, which was authorized by the United States Congress and ordered by president George W. Bush. The invasion was controversial among all political sides. In December 2002, American liberals were conflicted over whether or not going to war in Iraq was the correct decision; some felt that they should support the war, in accordance with their philosophy of liberal internationalism, i.e. support of military intervention.

One document cited as promoting a liberal hawkish point of view is Progressive Internationalism: A Democratic National Security Strategy, published by the Progressive Policy Institute in October 2003. Another document related to the stance is a letter to President Bush sent by Social Democrats USA in February 2003, which urged the military overthrow of Saddam Hussein's regime.

In January 2004, Paul Berman, Thomas Friedman, Christopher Hitchens, George Packer, Kenneth Pollack, Jacob Weisberg, Fareed Zakaria, and Fred Kaplan participated in a five-day online forum, Liberal Hawks Reconsider the Iraq War, in which they discussed whether they had been correct in advocating for military action against Saddam Hussein's regime. Kaplan by that point had renounced his prior support, but the general consensus among the participants was that, despite the absence of weapons of mass destruction in Iraq, the war had still been justified on humanitarian grounds.

Political scientists argue that liberals tend to be hawkish to counter criticism and accusations by conservatives of being "soft" and having a tendency of appeasing foreign adversaries. Others argue that they are driven by Wilsonian idealism to reshape the world in their image.

Neo-Wilsonian idealism is a modern revision of Wilsonian idealism that began in a post-World War I geo-political World Order, more specifically the Cold War, the War on Terror, and more broadly contemporary global challenges – emphasizing Woodrow Wilson's philosophy of international cooperation and democracy in modern times.

During the late 2000s and 2010s, numerous analysts identified former President Barack Obama as a liberal hawk, especially regarding his handling of the war on terror.

=== Opposition to the Sunshine Policy ===
The Sunshine Policy is the dovish foreign policy with North Korea of South Korean liberals, in which President Donald Trump has also expressed support, but the Washington establishment consisting of liberals and conservatives alike oppose their policy and support a more hawkish stance toward North Korea, creating a conflict with South Korean liberals.

Despite being a liberal, President Barack Obama opposed the Sunshine Policy and preferred a more hawkish foreign policy of "strategic patience".

The hostile diplomatic approach towards North Korea has made South Korea liberals prefer Donald Trump diplomatically, who is more transactional in nature in his dealings with North Korea. However, South Korean conservatives, who are more pro-American support the liberal hawks approach. In the 2020 United States presidential election, Hong Joon-pyo, known as a "Korean Trumpist", supported Joe Biden. Former president of South Korea, Yoon Suk-yeol, dubbed the "K-Trump" in South Korean media, defended President Joe Biden's policy toward North Korea and opposing the new Sunshine Policy approach of Donald Trump and South Korean liberals. In contrast, South Korean liberals Moon Chung-in and Kim Ou-joon supported Donald Trump's Sunshine Policy.

== Notable people ==
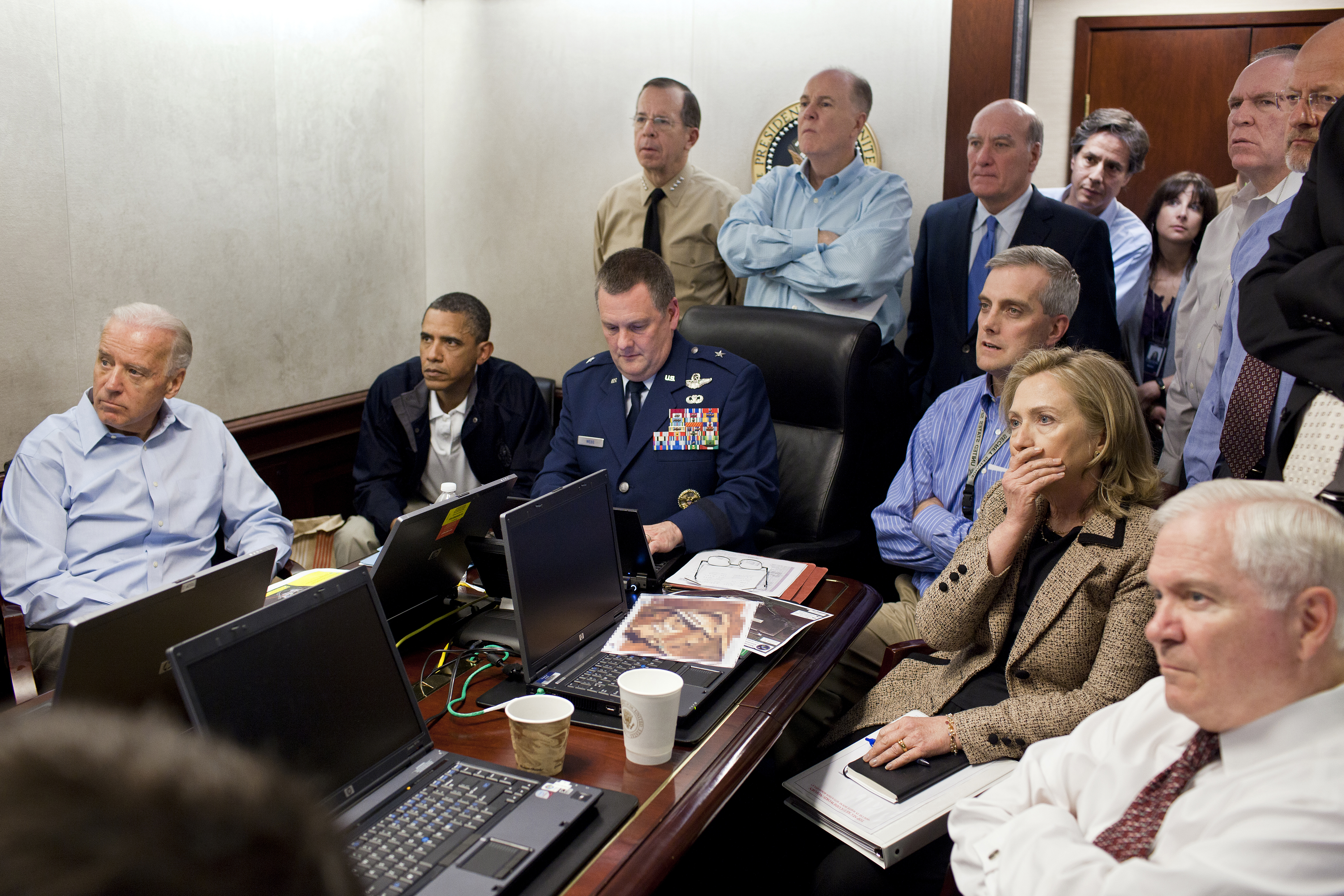
Former President Barack Obama (2009–2017) and members of his cabinet in the White House Situation Room during Operation Neptune Spear. His administration marked the height of hawkish liberalism during the early 2010s.

The list includes people who have been described as liberal hawks.

=== Politicians ===
- Joe Biden – former U.S. Senator from Delaware (1973–2009), former U.S. Vice President (2009–2017), former U.S. President (2021–2025)
- Lloyd Bentsen – former U.S. Representative from Texas (1948–1955), former U.S. Senator from Texas (1971–1993), former U.S. Secretary of the Treasury (1993–1994)
- Howard Berman – former U.S. Representative from California
- Tony Blair – former Prime Minister of the United Kingdom
- Michael Bloomberg – former New York City Mayor (2002–2013)
- Ben Cardin – former U.S. Senator from Maryland, former U.S. Representative from Maryland
- Hillary Clinton – former First Lady of the United States, former U.S. Senator from New York, former US Secretary of State, 2008 Democratic presidential candidate, 2016 Democratic presidential nominee
- Joe Donnelly – former U.S. Representative and senator from Indiana
- Eliot Engel – former U.S. Representative from New York
- John Fetterman – U.S. Senator from Pennsylvania
- Lois Frankel – U.S. Representative from Florida, former Mayor of West Palm Beach
- Al Gore – former U.S. Senator from Tennessee, former Vice President of the United States, 2000 Democratic presidential nominee
- Josh Gottheimer – U.S. Representative from New Jersey
- Jane Harman – former U.S. Representative from California
- Michael Ignatieff – former leader of the Liberal Party of Canada, former professor at Harvard's Carr Center for Human Rights Policy
- Henry "Scoop" Jackson – United States Senator who represented Washington State from 1953 to 1983
- Joe Lieberman – former U.S. Senator from Connecticut, 2000 Democratic vice presidential nominee, 2004 Democratic presidential candidate
- Tzipi Livni – former vice prime minister of Israel, founder of the Hatnuah party, Foreign Minister, Justice Minister and Leader of the Opposition.
- Tom Malinowski – former U.S. Representative from New Jersey
- Bob Menendez – former U.S. Senator from New Jersey, former U.S. Representative from New Jersey
- Sam Nunn – former U.S. Senator from Georgia (1972–1997)
- Barack Obama – former U.S. President (2009–2017)
- Brad Sherman – U.S. Representative from California
- Kyrsten Sinema – former U.S. Senator from Arizona, former U.S. Representative from Arizona
- Elissa Slotkin – current U.S. Senator from Michigan, former U.S. House of Representatives from Michigan, former Assistant Secretary of Defense for International Security Affairs
- Haley Stevens – U.S. Representative from Michigan

=== Government officials ===
- Madeleine Albright – former U.S. Ambassador to the United Nations, former U.S. Secretary of State
- Zbigniew Brzezinski – former National Security Advisor, political scientist
- Amos Hochstein – former Biden administration advisor and Former United States Assistant Secretary of State for Energy Resources
- Richard Holbrooke – former United States Ambassador to the United Nations
- Michael McFaul – former United States Ambassador to Russia
- Brett McGurk – former Biden administration advisor and former United States National Security Council Coordinator for the Middle East and North Africa
- Kenneth Pollack – former Clinton administration advisor and senior fellow at The Brookings Institution
- Samantha Power – former United States Ambassador to the United Nations
- Susan Rice
- Dennis Ross
- Anne-Marie Slaughter – Former Director of Policy Planning Staff of the United States
- Jake Sullivan – former U.S. National Security Advisor
- James Woolsey – former United States Under Secretary of the Navy

=== Other ===
- Anne Applebaum
- Ronald D. Asmus – scholar at the German Marshall Fund of the United States
- Paul Berman – contributing editor to Dissent and The New Republic (described as a 'Philosopher King' of liberal hawks)
- Jonathan Chait – self-described liberal hawk
- Larry Diamond – senior fellow at the Hoover Institution
- Thomas Friedman
- Sam Harris
- Christopher Hitchens – British-American journalist, essayist, critic and writer
- Van Jones
- Bill Keller
- Fred Kaplan
- Garry Kasparov
- Bernard-Henri Lévy
- Bill Maher
- Brian Reynolds Myers
- George Packer
- Simon Schama
- Michael Tomasky – Editor of Guardian America
- Jacob Weisberg
- Leon Wieseltier
- Fareed Zakaria

== Institutions and publications ==
- Atlantic Council
- Brookings Institution
- Center for a New American Security
- Center for American Progress
- The Atlantic

== See also ==
- 2011 military intervention in Libya
- Coalition for a Democratic Majority
- Cold War liberal
- Democracy promotion
- Globalization
- Interventionism (politics)
- Liberal Imperialists
- Liberal internationalism
- NATO bombing of Yugoslavia
- Neoconservatism
- Neoliberalism
- United States militarism
- United States support for Israel in the Gaza war
