= The Rebel (book) =

1951 book by Albert Camus

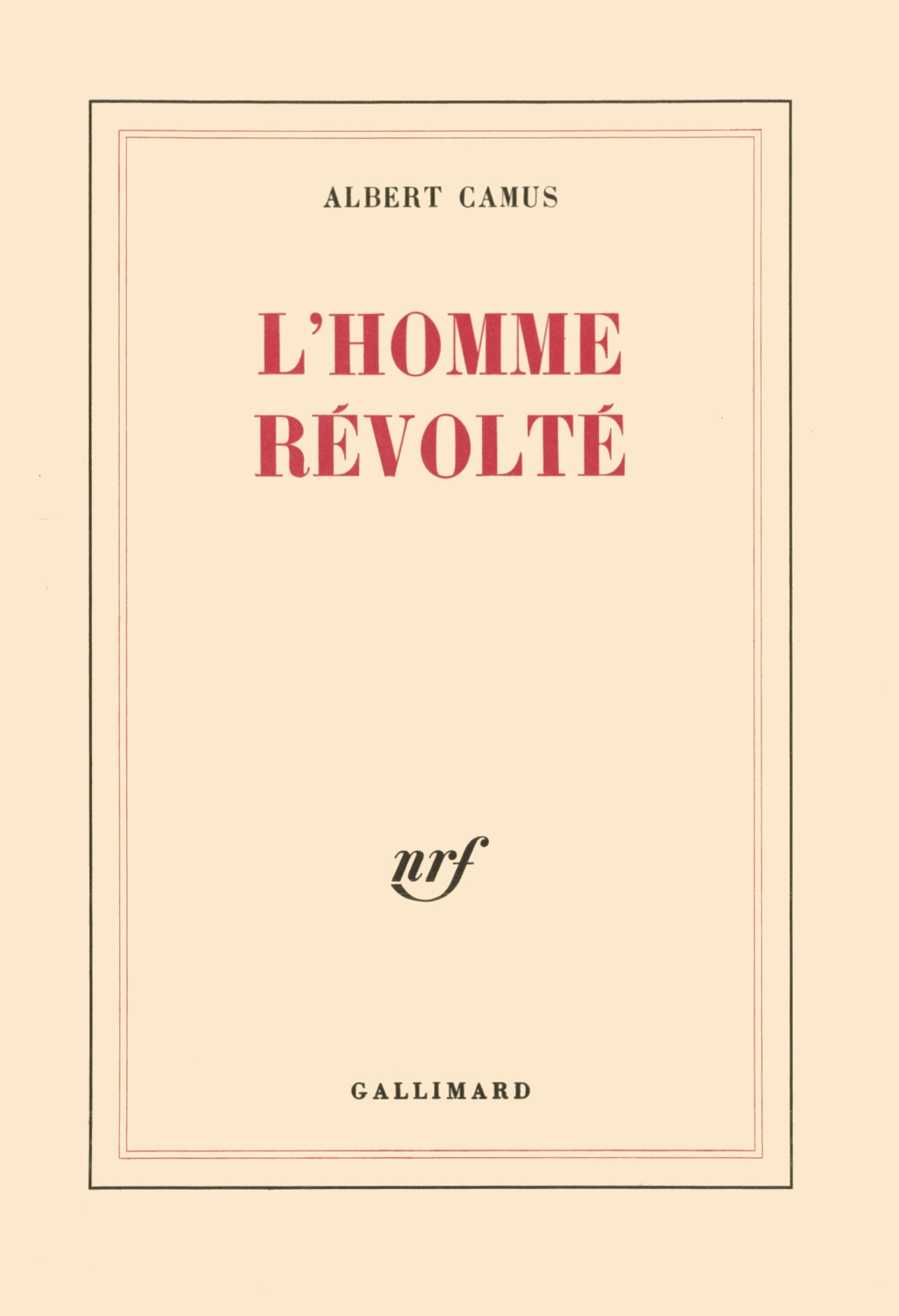
- Cover of the first edition
- Author: Albert Camus
- Original title: L'Homme révolté
- Translator: Anthony Bower
- Language: French
- Subject: Rebellion
- Published: 1951
- Publication place: France
- Media type: Print
- ISBN: 978-0679733843

The Rebel (French: L'Homme révolté) is a 1951 book-length essay by Albert Camus, which treats both the metaphysical and the historical development of rebellion and revolution in societies, especially Western Europe.

Examining both rebellion and revolt, which may be seen as the same phenomenon in personal and social frames, Camus examines several 'countercultural' figures and movements from the history of Western thought and art, noting the importance of each in the overall development of revolutionary thought and philosophy. He analyses the decreasing social importance of god, king and virtue and the development of nihilism. It can be seen as a sequel to The Myth of Sisyphus, where he ponders the meaning of life, because it answers the same question, but offers an alternative solution.

== Themes ==
One of Camus' primary arguments in The Rebel concerns the motivation for rebellion and revolution. While the two acts—which can be interpreted from Camus' writing as states of being—are radically different in most respects, they both stem from a basic human rejection of normative justice. If human beings become disenchanted with contemporary applications of justice, Camus suggests that they rebel. This rebellion, then, is the product of a basic contradiction between the human mind's unceasing quest for clarification and the apparently meaningless nature of the world. Described by Camus as "absurd," this latter perception must be examined with what Camus terms "lucidity." Camus concludes that such an 'absurdist' sensibility contradicts itself because when it claims to believe in nothing, it believes in its own protest and in the value of the protester's life. Therefore, this sensibility is logically a "point of departure" that irresistibly "exceeds itself." In the inborn impulse to rebel, on the other hand, we can deduce values that enable us to determine that murder and oppression are illegitimate and conclude with "hope for a new creation."

Another prominent theme in The Rebel, which is tied to the notion of incipient rebellion, is the inevitable failure of attempts at human perfection. Through an examination of various titular revolutions, and in particular the French Revolution, Camus argues that most revolutions involved a fundamental denial of both history and transcendental values. Such revolutionaries aimed to kill God. In the French Revolution, for instance, this was achieved through the execution of Louis XVI and subsequent eradication of the divine right of kings. The subsequent rise of materialist idealism sought "the end of history." Because this end is unattainable, according to Camus, terror ensued as the revolutionaries attempted to coerce results. This culminated in the "temporary" enslaving of people in the name of their future liberation. Notably, Camus' reliance on non-secular sentiment does not involve a defense of religion; indeed, the replacement of divinely-justified morality with pragmatism simply represents Camus' apotheosis of transcendental, moral values.

Faced with the manifest injustices of human existence on one hand, and the poor substitute of revolution on the other, Camus' rebel seeks to fight for justice without abandoning transcendental values, including the principle of the intrinsic value of human life. Consequently, of all the modern revolutionaries, Camus describes how the "fastidious assassins", namely the Russian terrorists led by Ivan Kalyayev, active in the early twentieth century were prepared to offer their own lives as payment for the lives they took, rather than licensing others to kill others.

A third is that of crime, as Camus discusses how rebels who get carried away lose touch with the original basis of their rebellion and offer various defenses of crime through various historical epochs.

At the end of the book, Camus espouses the possible moral superiority of the ethics and political plan of syndicalism. He grounds this politics in a wider "midday thought" which opposes love of this life, and an unrelativisable normative commitment to fellow human beings, against ideological promises of the other world, end of history, or triumph of an alleged master race.

The Encyclopædia Britannica Online summarised Camus views on rebellion:

[...] "The true rebel is not the person who conforms to the orthodoxy of some revolutionary ideology but a person who could say “no” to injustice. He suggested that the true rebel would prefer the politics of reform, such as that of modern trade-union socialism, to the totalitarian politics of Marxism or similar movements. The systematic violence of ideology—the crimes de logique that were committed in its name—appeared to Camus to be wholly unjustifiable. Hating cruelty, he believed that the rise of ideology in the modern world had added enormously to human suffering. Though he was willing to admit that the ultimate aim of most ideologies was to diminish human suffering, he argued that good ends did not authorize the use of evil means."

The Internet Encyclopedia of Philosophy explains that "the notion of Revolt refers to both a path of resolved action and a state of mind. It can take extreme forms such as terrorism or a reckless and unrestrained egoism (both of which are rejected by Camus), but basically, and in simple terms, it consists of an attitude of heroic defiance or resistance to whatever oppresses human beings."

== Reception ==
This work has received ongoing interest, influencing modern philosophers and authors such as Paul Berman. It was disliked by Marxists and existentialists, such as Jean-Paul Sartre, who wrote a critical response to it in the review Les Temps modernes in 1952. Many European Communists considered his thoughts to be reactionary.

Henri Peyre, writing for the Encyclopædia Britannica Online, considers the text to "consist of grave, but inconsistent and often unconvincing, essays loosely linked together." Aidan Curzon-Hobson considers it to be an important educational resource. He also considers it to be Camus's "most underexplored" text. According to David Simpson, writing for the Internet Encyclopedia of Philosophy, it is "a reflection on the nature of freedom and rebellion and a philosophical critique of revolutionary violence." It explicitly condemns Marxism-Leninism, emphatically denouncing unrestrained violence as a means of human liberation. With this book, Camus became an "outspoken champion of individual freedom and [...] an impassioned critic of tyranny and terrorism, whether practiced by the Left or by the Right."

According to Meghan E. Von Hassel, Camus presented a new humanism in this book. He found "hope in the beauty of solidarity which is rooted in the dignity of man, namely, that there is value in human life."

"Philosophically, The Rebel is Camus's most important book", according to John Foley, "although it is much maligned and frequently ignored".

Fred Rosen has examined the influence of ideas of Simone Weil on Camus' thinking in The Rebel. According to him, Camus adopted her criticism of Marxism and her conception of the rebel as an artisan. George F Selfer has analysed parallels between Camus and Friedrich Nietzsche in philosophical aesthetics and found significant similarities and profound differences.

== See also ==
- 1951 in literature
- Anarchism
