= Paul Berman =

American writer (born 1949)

- Born: Paul Lawrence Berman; 1949 (age 76–77)
- Education: Columbia University (MA)
- Occupation: Writer
- Writing career
- Genre: Non-fiction

Paul Lawrence Berman (born 1949) is an American writer on politics and literature.

His books include Terror and Liberalism (a New York Times best-seller in 2003), The Flight of the Intellectuals, A Tale of Two Utopias, Power and the Idealists, and an illustrated children's book, Make-Believe Empire. He edited, among other anthologies, Carl Sandburg: Selected Poems, for the American Poets Project of the Library of America.

Born to a Jewish family, Berman attended Columbia University, receiving an M.A. in American history in 1973. Berman was a longtime contributor to The Village Voice, then The New Republic. He is critic-at-large at Tablet, a member of the editorial board of Dissent, and an Advisory Editor at Fathom. He has been awarded fellowships from the MacArthur and Guggenheim foundations and from the Cullman Center for Scholars & Writers at the New York Public Library. He was a Regents' Lecturer at the University of California, Irvine, and a Distinguished Writer in Residence at New York University.

== Totalitarianism and the modern world ==
External videos
- Booknotes interview with Berman on Terror and Liberalism, June 22, 2003, C-SPAN

In Terror and Liberalism, Berman offers a theory of totalitarianism. In his interpretation, totalitarian movements of the right and the left arose in Europe in the aftermath of the First World War as a reaction to the successes and failures of liberal civilization. The ideologies promoted mythologies of world events that were paranoid, apocalyptic, utopian, obsessed with purity, and ultimately nihilist. In Berman's account, the totalitarian movements were mass mobilizations for unattainable aims.

Berman tries to trace the influence of these European movements upon the modern Muslim world. He identifies two principal totalitarian tendencies in the Muslim countries, Baathism and radical Islamism – mutually hostile movements whose doctrines, in his interpretation, overlap and have allowed for alliances. Berman regards suicide terror and the cult of martyrdom as a re-emergence of totalitarianism's nihilist strand.

Berman draws a distinction between the religion of Islam, founded in the 7th century, and the political movement of radical Islamism. In July 2010, he wrote in the Wall Street Journal that "Islamism is a modern, instead of an ancient, political tendency, which arose in a spirit of fraternal harmony with the fascists of Europe in the 1930s and '40s."

In Berman's interpretation, observers relying on modern liberal values have sometimes found it difficult to identify the anti-liberal and anti-rational quality of totalitarian movements. Berman proposed this argument and offered an explanation based on the concept of "rationalist naiveté" in Terror and Liberalism. He developed the argument further in The Flight of the Intellectuals.

Berman's ideas have influenced writers such as Martin Amis and Bernard-Henri Lévy, helping to shape debates about the concept of the "post-left" in Britain. Amis invokes Berman's argument in the opening paragraph of his book on 9/11, The Second Plane (New York: Alfred A. Knopf, 2008), p. ix. Regarding Lévy, see p. 269 of his book American Vertigo (NY: Random House, 2006) and an article in The American Interest. The British journalist Nick Cohen, in explaining his switch to support for the wider war on terror, cited Terror and Liberalism as a major influence: "The only time I realised I was charging up a blind alley was when I read Paul Berman's Terror and Liberalism. I didn't see a blinding light or hear a thunder clap or cry 'Eureka!' If I was going to cry anything it would have been 'Oh bloody hell!' ... I was going to have to turn it round and see the world afresh. The labour would involve reconsidering everything I'd written since 11 September, arguing with people I took to be friends and finding myself on the same side as people I took to be enemies. All because of Berman."

Berman's approach has not been without its critics. A writer in The Nation magazine, Anatol Lieven, labeled Berman a "Philosopher king" of the liberal hawks and criticized him for "[promoting] and [justifying] the most dangerous aspect of the Bush Administration's approach to the war on terrorism: the lumping together of radically different elements in the Muslim world into one homogeneous enemy camp." Berman has also been criticized in books by the liberal sociologist, Alan Wolfe, and the neo-Marxist political theorist, Robert Meister.

== Liberal interventionism and the Middle East ==
Berman argued that the NATO war in the former Yugoslavia in 1999 was justified by the doctrine of "liberal interventionism": an intervention intended to rescue endangered populations from extreme oppression and to promote liberal and democratic freedom. He looked on the 2001 invasion of Afghanistan and the 2003 invasion of Iraq in the same light. In the run-up to the invasion of Iraq, he declined to endorse the Bush administration's policy and warned that it was likely to fail: "we are wielding power without liberalism, which will turn out to be no power at all."

Once the invasion had begun, he nonetheless called on the liberal left to support the war on humanitarian and anti-totalitarian grounds, even while continuing to elaborate his criticism of the larger Bush Doctrine. His pro-war and anti-Bush positions confused some, as they managed to irk people on each side of the American political spectrum. His argument corresponded, however, to the views of the political tendency that is sometimes described as the anti-totalitarian left. He was one of the American signatories of the Euston Manifesto in 2006, a British document which expressed that tendency. Berman is also sometimes associated with the "New Philosophers" movement in France.

Reflecting on the Iraq War in 2007, Berman wrote in The New York Review of Books, "I approved on principle the overthrow of Saddam. I never did approve of Bush's way of going about it. In the run-up to the war, I became, on practical grounds, ever more fearful that, in his blindness to liberal principles, Bush was leading us over a cliff… It is true and it is a matter of satisfaction to me that, in the years since then, I have not made a career of saying 'I told you so.'"

Speaking of Israel in an interview, Berman commented of anti-Zionism that its "true origin ... is anti-Semitism, the assumption that the Jews are the center of the world and therefore the center of the world's evil."

== History of the 1968 generation ==
External videos
- Presentation by Berman on A Tale of Two Utopias, January 17, 1997, C-SPAN

Berman's A Tale of Two Utopias and Power and the Idealists are the first two parts of a history of the so-called Generation of 1968 (of which he was a member). He argues that packaged together with the liberal ideals in this movement were decidedly disturbing elements. Joschka Fischer, for example, the 1968 activist who would later become a leading figure in the German Green Party and Foreign Minister, decided that there was in fact the presence of antisemitic impulses in this movement when he saw the Revolutionary Cells participate in the Entebbe hijacking. The hijackers split the passengers by ethnicity, with Jews on the one side and non-Jews on the other, with the intention to kill all of the former.

Also, Berman tracks major figures like Bernard Kouchner—the later founder of Doctors Without Borders—a member of the 1968 Generation who would later marry active improvement of human rights to established political goals.

At the close of the book, Berman considers the effect of the war in Iraq on these graduates of '68. He suggests that the war split the movement greatly, with many now deeply aware of the dramatic excesses of the regime of Saddam Hussein, as well as the potential negative consequences if such a dictator remained in power. Nonetheless, they were deeply concerned by the arguments offered by the Bush administration.

== Comments from Michael Moore ==
In 1986, Michael Moore became the editor of Mother Jones magazine. He was fired a few months later, partly for refusing to print an article by Berman that was critical of the Sandinista human rights record in Nicaragua. Moore believed Berman's claims to be inaccurate: "The article was flatly wrong and the worst kind of patronizing bullshit. You would scarcely know from it that the United States had been at war with Nicaragua for the last five years." Moore sued for wrongful dismissal, with the case settled out of court for $58,000; Moore used the settlement as seed funds for his first film, Roger & Me.

In 2011, Moore humorously described Berman as a "neo-nudnik."

== Bibliography ==
- Berman, Paul (1972). (ed.). Quotations from the Anarchists. Praeger Publishers.
- Berman, Paul (1996). A Tale of Two Utopias: The Political Journey of the Generation of 1968. W W Norton & Company. ISBN 0-393-03927-7.
- Berman, Paul (2003). Terror and Liberalism. W W Norton & Company. ISBN 0-393-05775-5.
- Berman, Paul (2005). Power and the Idealists: Or, The Passion of Joschka Fischer, and its Aftermath. Soft Skull Press. ISBN 1-932360-91-3. New edition, with preface by Richard Holbrooke, W. W. Norton, 2007. ISBN 978-0-393-33021-2.
- Berman, Paul (2010). Flight of the Intellectuals. Melville House. ISBN 978-1-933-63351-0.
