= Triangular diplomacy =

Foreign policy strategy

In political science, triangular diplomacy is a foreign policy of the United States, developed during the Vietnam War (1955–1975) by diplomat Henry Kissinger, as a means to manage relations and tensions between the contesting communist powers, the Soviet Union and China. Connecting heavily with the correlating policy of linkage, the policy was intended to exploit the ongoing rivalry between the two largest Communist powers (following the Sino-Soviet split [1956–1966]), as a means to strengthen American hegemony and diplomatic interest during the Cold War.

Interrelating primarily with the subsequent development of the détente era (1969–1979) amid Cold War tensions, triangular diplomacy was instituted in order to prevent the decline of American authority during the Vietnam War following the perceived inefficiencies of George Kennan's defensive policy of communism containment and Dwight Eisenhower's offensive policy of rollback. Hence, triangular diplomacy was an instrumental facet in the shifting of Cold War policy toward talks of co-operation and diplomacy, and thus set a precedent for the eventual relaxation of tensions between the two superpowers through a focus on mutual benefit (as evidenced in the Strategic Arms Limitation Talks (SALT) and the Strategic Arms Reduction (START) treaties).

== Terminology ==
In principle, the policy of triangular diplomacy seeks to link the interests of three powerful states in order to retain a balance of power within the international system. Most commonly, this involves an insecure state (or states) pursuing strategic alliances or economic deals in an attempt to both weaken the hegemony of a powerful adversary and strengthen their own position. First developed by U.S. advisor Henry Kissinger during the Vietnam War era, the policy was argued to be most effective when reliant upon “the natural incentives and propensities of the players.”

Conceived in a period of American political weakness, Kissinger's doctrine argues that foreign policy needed to rely on a combination of diplomacy and military power in order to bring benefits to all relevant players, and subsequently ensure international stability. This doctrine heavily relates to a neorealist analysis of international politics, professed by scholars such as Kenneth Waltz. Kissinger's desires to seek a “coalition” with China in order to stabilise the power of the Soviet Union reflects the neorealist balance of power theory, as insecure states are seeking to bring an equilibrium to the international order in an attempt to bring peace and benefit the relevant actors.

== Vietnam War ==
Entering into the White House during the height of the Vietnam War, one of Kissinger's primary intentions with his policy was to gain Soviet and Chinese assistance in softening North Vietnamese troops, and withdrawing from the conflict with dignity. The Sino-Soviet split offered a ripe opportunity for Kissinger and Nixon to enact such a policy, intended by offering integration into the international trade system, scientific and technological resources and a stabilization of bilateral relations. The first instance of this rapprochement and the beginnings of triangular diplomacy within US policy is reflected in a 14 August 1969 National Security meeting, in which Nixon positioned his intentions to victimise China within the Sino-Soviet split and seek to offer assistance.

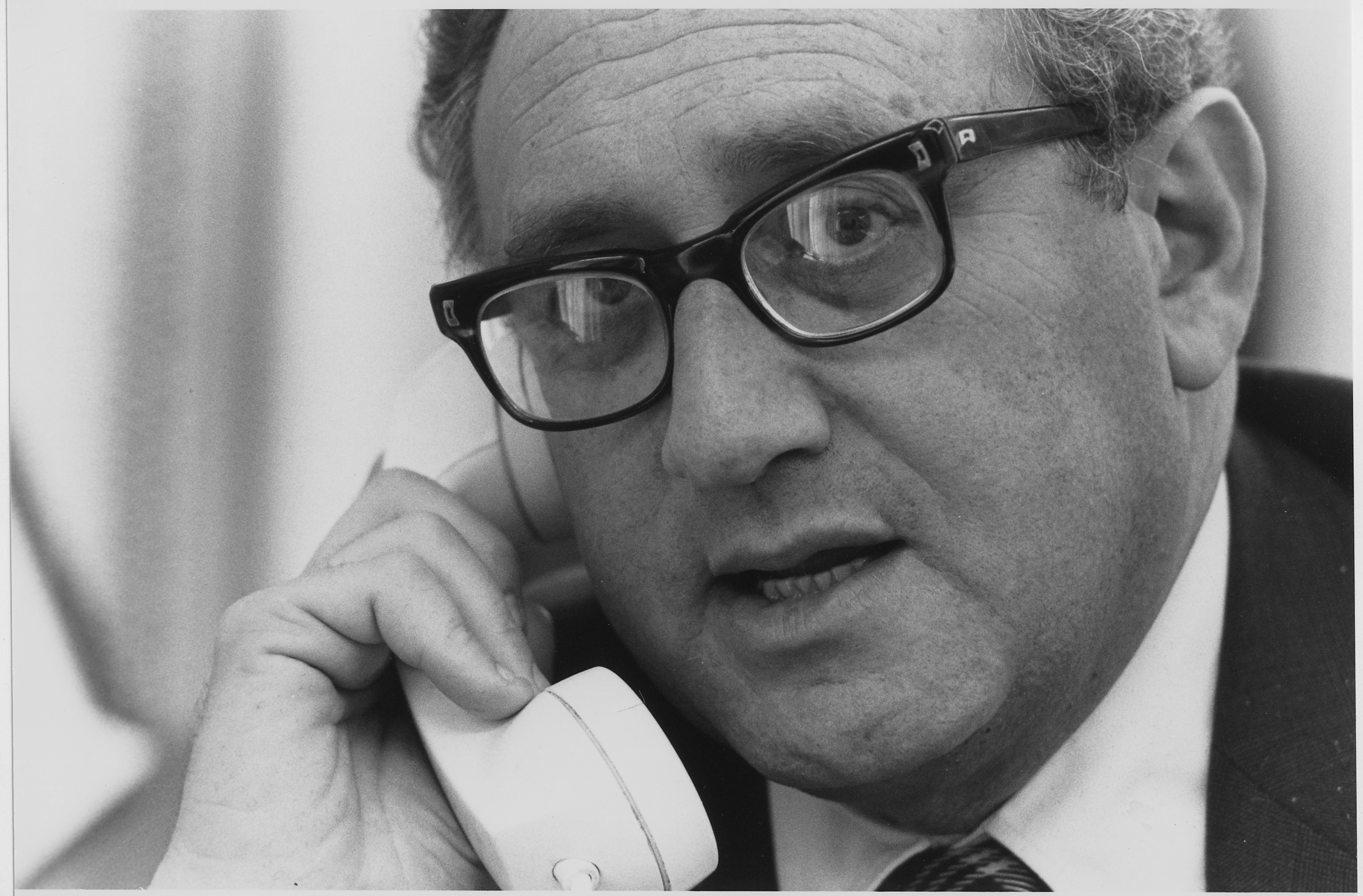
Henry Kissinger, who was U.S. National Security Advisor and Secretary of State under Presidents Nixon and Ford, was a central figure in the Cold War while in office (1969–1977).

The following 1972 Beijing and Moscow summits further exacerbated the existing tensions between China and the Soviet Union, allowing Nixon and Kissinger to gain Soviet co-operation on matters deemed important to U.S. foreign policy. This can be examined in the outcome of the 1972 Spring Offensive, as the United States were able to gain diplomatic co-operation in reaching a peace with North Vietnamese forces. Many scholars contend that Nixon's rapprochement with China, as part of the triangular diplomacy framework, was an instrumental facet in the dissolution of the Vietnam War. Historian Raymond Garthoff argues that triangular diplomacy held a significant bearing on the settlement of the Vietnam War, whilst Jussi Hanhimäki contends that the policy played a critical role in bringing about changes in North Vietnamese negotiation strategy.

However, triangular diplomacy did not ensure immediate stability and peaceful cooperation. The Vietnam War continued in full force for three years after the emergence of the policy, with continued U.S.-Soviet conflict evolving underneath. For Kissinger and Nixon, the policy was secondary to national interests and security concerns, as the nation needed to appear politically powerful against adversaries.

== Détente ==
Following the Vietnam War, Kissinger sought to reshape the U.S. approach to international relations, seeking a balance of power which could produce stability and thereby reduce military and political tensions between the three main players in the international order; the Soviet Union, the United States, and China. Triangular diplomacy consequently included the aim of achieving this balance of power and pursuing the policy of détente with the Soviet Union.

In The White House Years, Kissinger argued that the connected policies of rapprochement with China and détente with the Soviet Union advanced American interests. He reasoned that it was better for the United States “to be closer to either Moscow or Peking than either was to the other.”

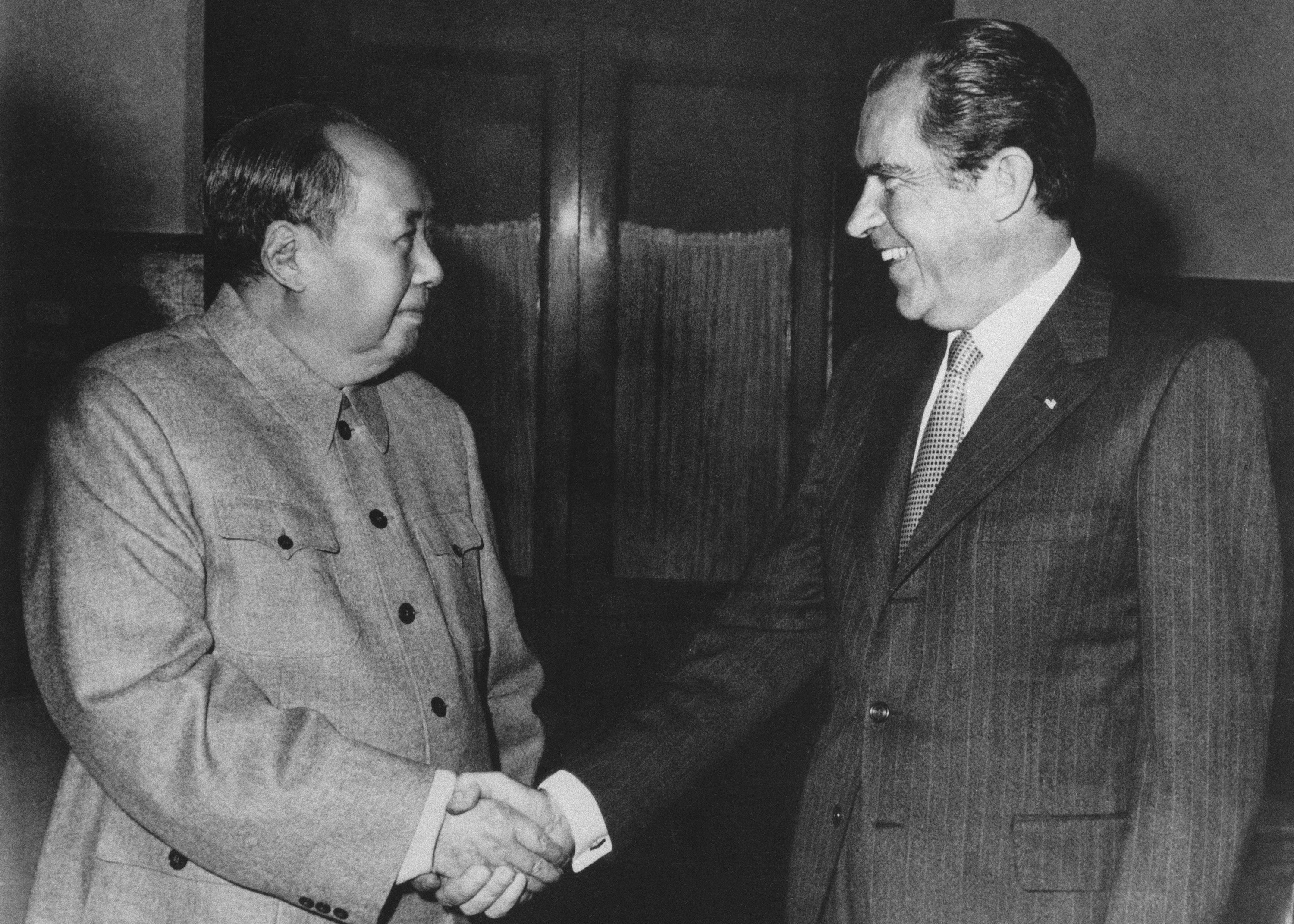
President Richard Nixon Shaking Hands with Chairman Mao Tse-tung during Nixon's visit to China.

Key outcomes of triangular diplomacy during this period include the Strategic Arms Limitation Treaty (SALT), the signing of the Shanghai Communiqué and the Camp David Accords. However, the policy of détente was ultimately overhauled as it was depicted as a sign of American political weakness. American nationalists saw the policy as a way for the Soviet Union to manipulate the U.S. under the pretenses of diplomacy, evidenced by what the nationalists saw as the Soviets's refusal to ratify the Strategic Arms Limitation Treaty. In addition, the Soviet invasion of Afghanistan in 1979 solidified the re-invigoration of Cold War hostilities and marked the conclusive end of détente. With the election of Gerald Ford, triangular diplomacy was overlooked for the remainder of the Cold War.

== After the Cold War ==
Following the Cold War, triangular diplomacy was redefined to that of "coordinated action by two states (which, in keeping with the triangle metaphor, we refer to collectively as the base) to change behaviour of another state (the 'target')".

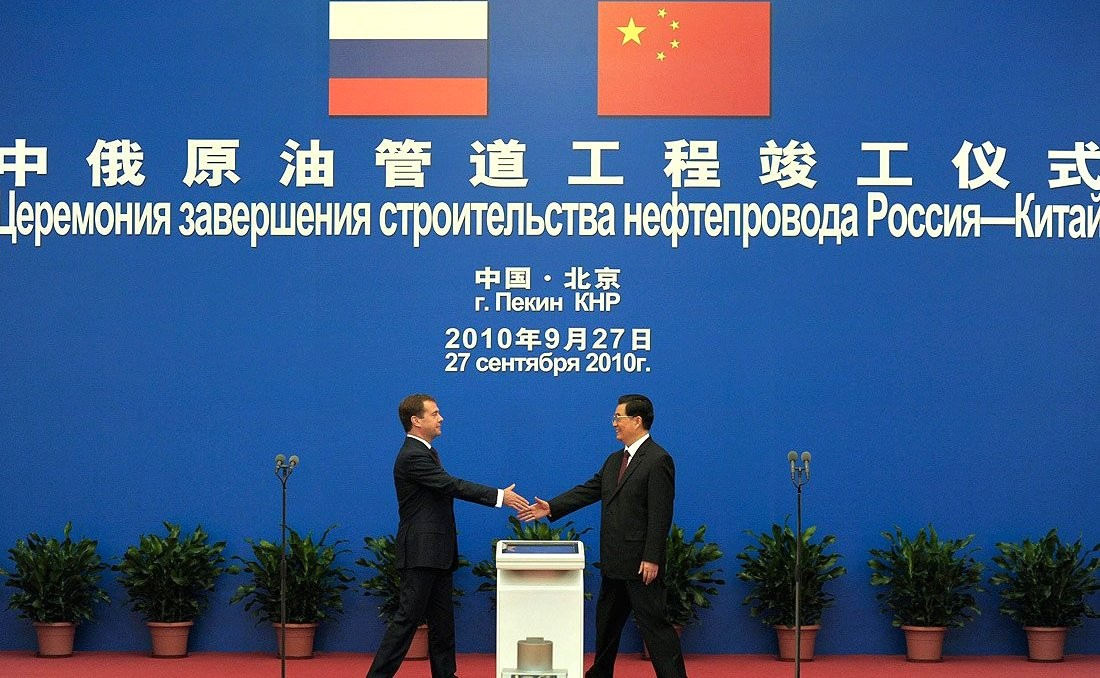
Dmitry Medvedev and Hu Jintao at a ceremony marking the completion of the Russia-China oil pipeline.

The signing of the 2001 Sino-Russian Treaty of Friendship represented a diplomatic effort by Russia and China to strengthen their position in their dealings with the United States, and marked a return to the triangular diplomacy. Results of this treaty included; the construction of the Eastern Siberia-Pacific Ocean oil pipeline, and the increase of Russian sources of capital into China. The New York Times argued that while this manifestation of triangular diplomacy was "a new form…with diminished strategic significance", the agreement established "at least a symbolic barrier to unhindered American domination."

=== Indo-Pacific and United States relations ===
The interactions between the United States, India, and China is another example of triangular diplomacy in the post Cold War-era. As the rise of China has challenged American primacy in Asia, American policymakers have turned their attention onto India as part of U.S. efforts to counterbalance China.

=== Russo-Ukrainian War ===
Triangular diplomacy can be seen to be at work in the interactions between the U.S., E.U. and Russia in relation to the Russo-Ukrainian War. In particular, the interactions between the United States, the European Union, and the Russian Federation. The EU and U.S. attempted to balance Russia through the joint imposition of economic sanctions on the country. In addition to marking the rise of the EU as a major international actor in foreign policy, the Ukraine crisis marked a shift in triangular diplomacy away from its neorealist inclination, to more of a liberal position regarding international cooperation, as the U.S. and EU sought to assist Ukraine in an attempt to ensure peace as opposed to serving national interests.

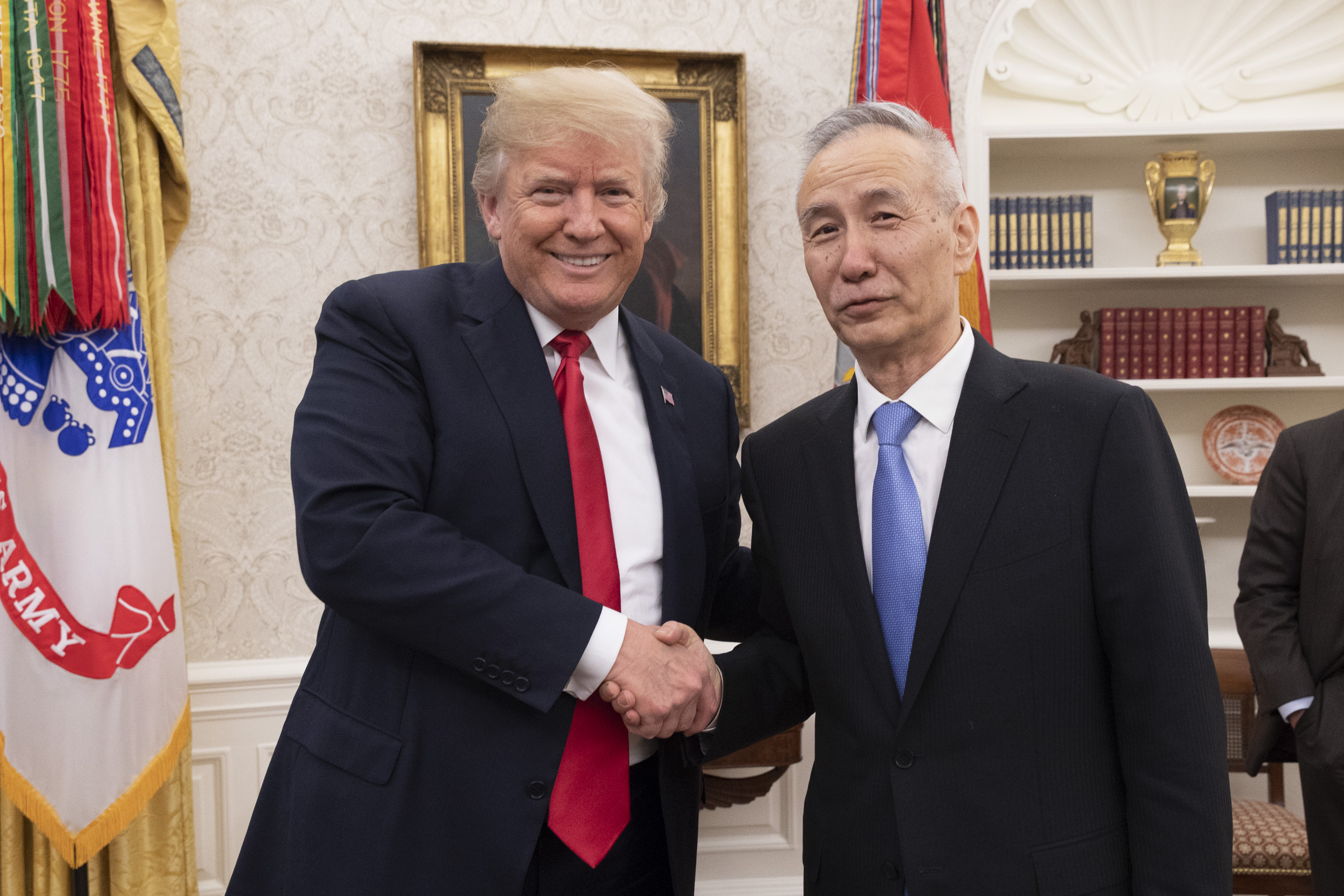
President Trump talks trade with the Vice Premier of China, Liu He, May 2018

=== Trump administration ===
The foreign policy of the Trump administration has found similarities with that of triangular diplomacy; in particular, regarding American involvement in the Asia-Pacific region in an attempt to balance out the power of China. Advisors Alexander Gray and Peter Navarro have tried to implement a more muscular foreign policy in the region through improved relations with Taiwan, hence implementing triangular diplomacy principles. Washington Post writer Marc Thiessen argues that this is to be achieved through free trade agreement and upgrading the state's political representation, following Trump's unstable position regarding the One China policy.

== International relations theory ==
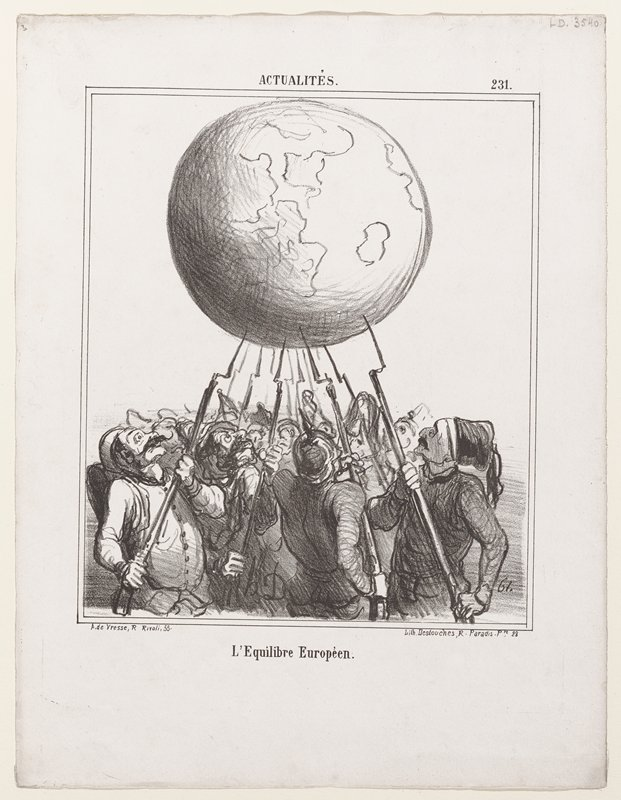
1866 political cartoon by Honoré Daumier, L'Equilibre Européen, representing the balance of power as men in differing military uniforms balancing the earth on bayonets

The triangular diplomacy framework is contingent upon the realist and neorealist analysis of international politics, which advocates a zero sum form of geopolitical conflict, through which the overriding paradigms of statism, survival and self help define political interactions. By attempting to connect the interests of competing powers in order to manifest a mutual political benefit, Kissinger's policy reflects the realist balance of power theory which argues that national and global stability is secured when military capability is distributed correspondingly amongst states, in order to avoid global unipolarity.

As can be examined within the Vietnam War era, in the attempt of one state to ensure their own survival in the global anarchic system through increasing economic and military strength, this in turn fuels the insecurities of less powerful states. As a result, insecure states seek to form a coalition and subsequently balance out the power of their superior, thus bringing security to the international system. Hence, reflecting the formation of a coalition between the United States and China in response to the growing power of the Soviet Union within the Vietnamese sphere, in order to achieve a level of global stability through détente. As per scholar Raymond Aron, an achievement of this system will consequently manifest peace, as a “more or less lasting suspension of rivalry between political units” will ensue.

However, as is evidenced from the inherent U.S. unipolarity which has marked the 21st century, and failures of triangular diplomacy to substantiate such a peace, scholars Wohlforth, Little and Kaufman argue that these facets evidence the failures of the balance of power theory to correlate within the contemporary international environment. Moreover, positioning triangular diplomacy as a point of contention within international relations theory, as whilst its tenets subscribe to realist thought, its developments within the contemporary era have positioned it against a constructivist or post-structuralist approach to international politics, advocated by scholars such as Wendt.
