= Neo-Wilsonian idealism =

Modern interpretation of Wilsonian idealism

Neo-Wilsonian Idealism refers to a modern revision of Wilsonian Idealism that began in a Post-World War I geo-political World Order, more specifically The Cold War, The War on Terror, and more broadly contemporary global challenges - emphasizing Woodrow Wilson's Philosophy of International cooperation and Democracy in modern times.

== Neo-Wilsonian Idealism in Praxis ==
American Intervention in Iraq, Afghanistan, and Kosovo has been labeled Wilsonian idealism in modern times .

== Influence on Neoconservativism ==
Neoconservatism was influenced by Neo-Wilsonian idealism, it adopted and repurposed Wilson’s belief that the United States should actively spread liberal democracy and remake international order in accordance with universal values. Post-9/11 Bush doctrine had Wilsonian policy goals such as regime change and democracy promotion.

== Neo-Wilsonian idealist influence on American Presidents ==
Presidents Bill Clinton, George W. Bush, and Barack Obama have been described as adhering to a modern version of Wilsonian idealism.

== Neo-Wilsonian idealism outside of The United States ==
Former British Prime Minister Tony Blair has been described as a adhering to modern Wilsonian idealism.
