= Liberal internationalism =

International relations policy holding that states should advance liberal interests

Liberal internationalism is a foreign policy doctrine that supports international institutions, open markets, cooperative security, and liberal democracy. At its core, it holds that states should participate in international institutions that uphold rules-based norms, promote liberal democracy, and facilitate cooperation on transnational problems (such as environmental problems, arms control, and public health).

Proponents of liberal internationalism argue that the adoption of this foreign policy orientation by the United States during the 20th century has improved American liberty at home and ensured American hegemony in world politics, as well as facilitated the spread of liberal democracy and markets. Critics of the foreign policy doctrine (such as realists and proponents of retrenchment) argue that it tends towards military interventionism and contributes to disorder (for example, through democracy promotion and trade liberalization).

== History ==
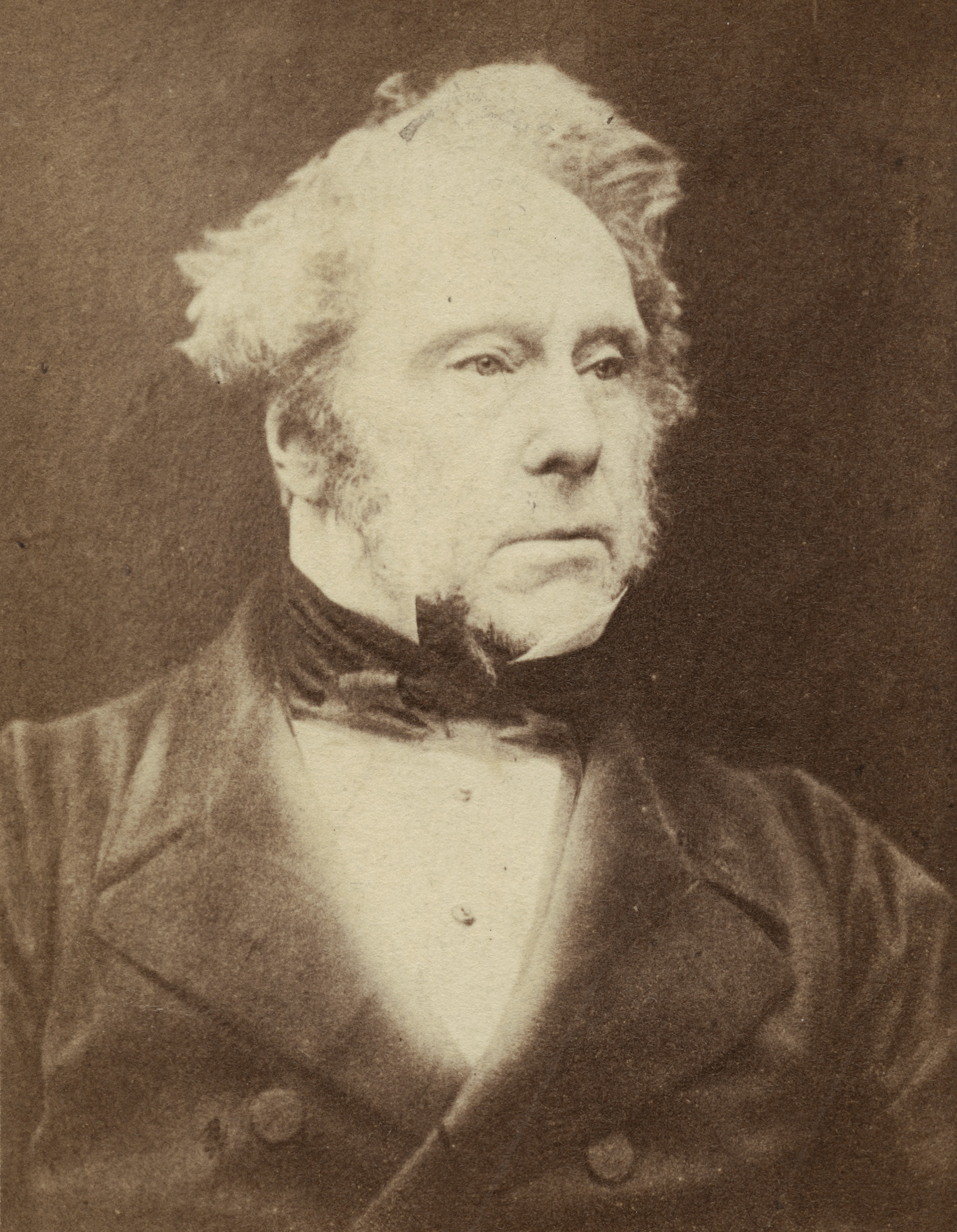
Liberal internationalism emerged during the 19th century, notably under the auspices of British Foreign Secretary and Prime Minister Lord Palmerston.

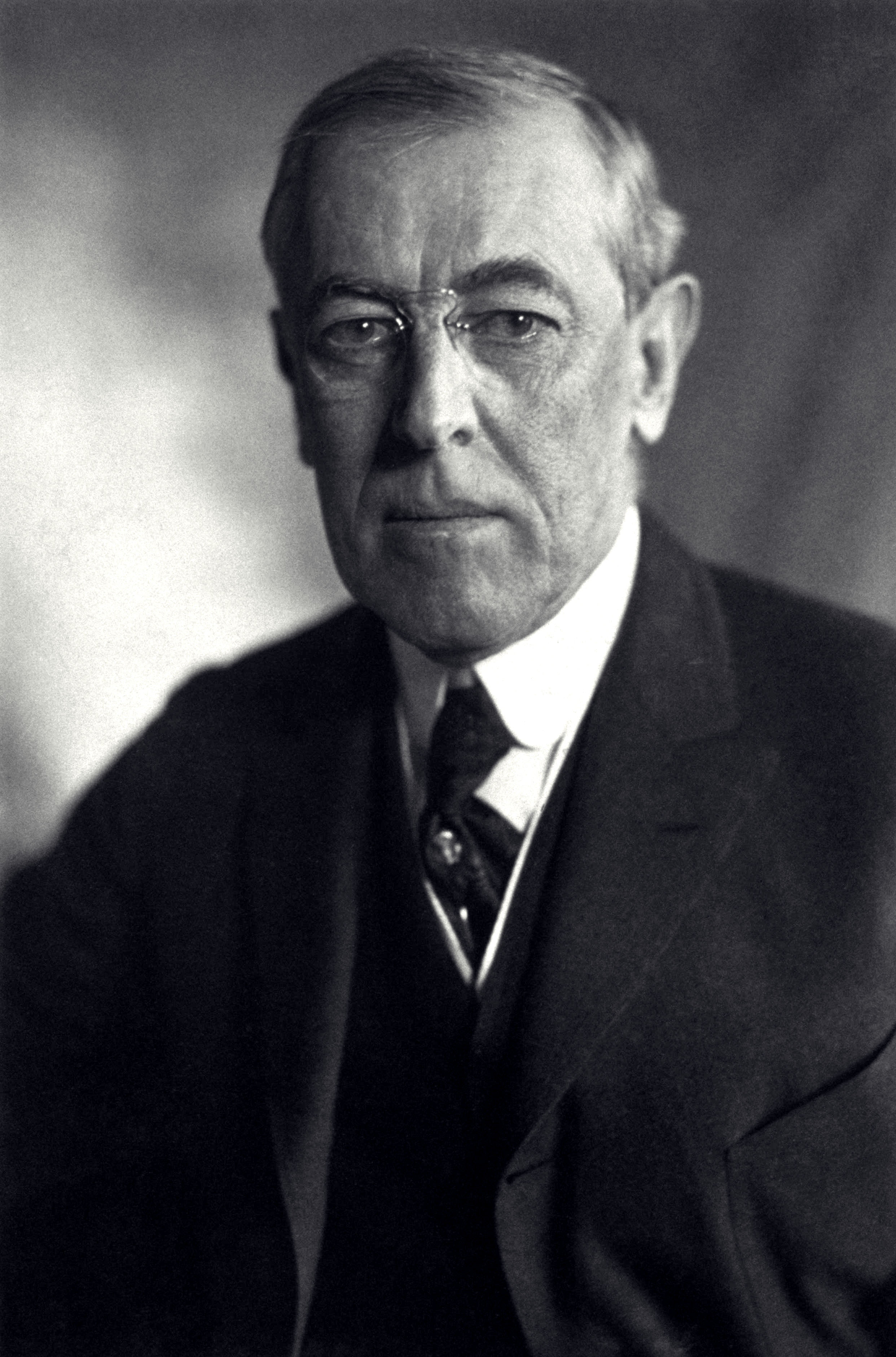
Liberal internationalism was developed in the second decade of the 20th century under U.S. President Woodrow Wilson.

Liberal internationalism emerged during the 19th century. Prominent thinkers included Lionel Curtis, Alfred Zimmern and Norman Angell.

Among policymakers, liberal internationalism influenced British Foreign Secretary and Prime Minister Lord Palmerston, and was developed in the second decade of the 20th century under U.S. President Woodrow Wilson. In this form it became known as Wilsonianism. After World War I, the foreign policy doctrine of liberal internationalism was retained (but it also suffered a "jolt" in the words of John Ikenberry as a result of WW1, namely against the "optimistic narratives" that liberal internationalism espouses) by the intellectual founders of the League of Nations and augmented somewhat with ideas from classical radicalism and the political party platform of the International Entente of Radical and Similar Democratic Parties. Daniel Deudney and John Ikenberry have also associated liberal internationalism with foreign policy ideas promoted by Franklin D. Roosevelt. Paul K. MacDonald has linked diplomatic practices developed at the 1899 and 1907 Hague conferences as being key repertoires of subsequent liberal internationalism.

== Theory ==
The goal of liberal internationalism is to achieve global structures within the international system that are inclined towards promoting a liberal world order (also referred to as "liberal international order"). It foresees a gradual transformation of world politics from anarchy to common institutions and the rule of law. To that extent, global free trade, liberal economics and liberal political systems are all encouraged. In addition, liberal internationalists are dedicated towards encouraging democracy to emerge globally. Once realized, it will result in a "peace dividend", as liberal states have relations that are characterized by non-violence, and that relations between democracies are characterized by the democratic peace theory.

Liberal internationalism states that, through multilateral organizations such as the United Nations, it is possible to avoid the worst excesses of "power politics" in relations between nations. In addition, liberal internationalists believe that the best way to spread democracy is to treat all states equally and cooperatively, whether they are initially democratic or not.

According to Abrahamsen, liberal internationalism provides more opportunities to middle powers to advance their economic, security, and political interests.

== Examples ==
Examples of liberal internationalists include former British Prime Minister Tony Blair, U.S. President Barack Obama, British historian Timothy Garton Ash, and then Secretary of State Hillary Clinton, and former Secretary of State Antony Blinken. In the US, it is often associated with the American Democratic Party. Some liberal-leaning neoconservatives shifted towards liberal internationalism in the 2010s.

Commonly cited examples of liberal interventionism include NATO's intervention in Bosnia and Herzegovina; the 1999 NATO bombing of Yugoslavia; the 1999 UN intervention in East Timor; British military intervention in the Sierra Leone Civil War; and the 2011 military intervention in Libya. According to historian Timothy Garton Ash, these are distinct because of liberal motivations and limited objectives, from other larger scale military interventions.

Multilateral institutions, such as UNDP, UNICEF, WHO, IAEA, and the UN General Assembly, have also been considered prominent examples of liberal internationalism.

To cite a country-specific example, according to John Ikenberry and Yolchi Funabashi, one of the key pillars of liberal internationalism in practice is the democratic constitution and trade-based prosperity of Japan, which makes Japan a major stabilizer of liberal international order in the APAC region.

Neo-Wilsonian idealism is a modern revision of Wilsonian Idealism that began in a Post-World War I political World Order, more specifically The Cold War ,The War on Terror, and more broadly contemporary global challenges.

Bill Clinton, George W. Bush, Barack Obama, and Tony Blair have been described as adhering to a modern version of Wilsonian idealism.

== See also ==
- Atlanticism
- City upon a Hill
- Cold War liberal
- Cosmopolitan democracy
- Empire of Liberty
- Humanitarian intervention
- Idealism (international relations)
- Internationalism (politics)
- Liberal hawk
- Liberal Imperialists
- Liberal international order
- Liberal institutionalism
- Nation-building
- Neoliberalism
- Neoconservatism
- Perpetual peace
