= Coalition for a Democratic Majority =

Centrist faction of the US Democratic Party

- Prominent members: Henry M. Jackson; Tom Foley; David Boren; Lloyd Bentsen; Les Aspin; Richard Perle; Jeane Kirkpatrick; Paul Wolfowitz
- Founded: 1972
- Succeeded by: New Democrats; Neoconservatives
- Ideology: Social liberalism Anti-communism
- Political position: Centre
- Slogan: "Come Home, Democrats"

The Coalition for a Democratic Majority (CDM) was a centrist faction, active in the 1970s within the Democratic Party of the United States. The CDM was formed in December 1972, after the landslide victory of Republican Richard Nixon over Democrat George McGovern in the 1972 presidential election, by inspiration from Henry M. Jackson, junior United States senator from Washington. Jackson was a Cold War liberal, an anti-Communist, a supporter of high military spending and a hard line against the Soviet Union, especially on human rights' issues, but also a strong supporter of the welfare state, social programs and labor unions. Despite the CDM's substantial membership and support, Jackson, who had run also in 1972, came fifth in 1976 Democratic presidential primaries (during which he came first in Massachusetts and his home state, and second in Florida and Pennsylvania) and failed to win the Democratic nomination, which went to Jimmy Carter.

The CDM received great support from the American Federation of Labor and Congress of Industrial Organizations (AFL–CIO) and, as later groups (as the Democratic Leadership Council and the New Democrat Network), argued that, in order to win, the Democrats should return to a more centrist, big tent stance. The CDM's manifesto was indeed titled "Come Home, Democrats" and declared that "The "New Politics" has failed". The CDM also attracted members from the Social Democrats, USA (SDUSA), the moderate wing of the Socialist Party of America (SPA), and, chiefly, the SPA's youth wing, the Young People's Socialist League (YPSL).

Leading CDM members included Les Aspin, Daniel Bell, Lloyd Bentsen, Peter Berger, David Boren, Midge Decter, Tom Foley, Nathan Glazer, Ernest Hollings, Hubert Humphrey, Samuel Huntington, Daniel Inouye, Max Kampelman, Jeane Kirkpatrick, Charles Krauthammer, Irving Kristol, Seymour Martin Lipset, Daniel Patrick Moynihan, Joshua Muravchik, Michael Novak, Sam Nunn, Richard Perle, Richard Pipes, Norman Podhoretz, Bill Richardson, Chuck Robb, Eugene Rostow, Ben Wattenberg, Paul Wolfowitz, James Woolsey and Jim Wright. Many of these were later associated with neoconservatism. Some, including Aspin, Bentsen, Nunn, Richardson, Robb and Woolsey, participated in the Democratic Leadership Council and/or Bill Clinton's administration, while several others, including Kirkpatrick, Krauthammer, Kristol, Muravchik, Novak, Perle, Pipes, Podhoretz and Wolfowitz, eventually became Republicans and/or served under Ronald Reagan, George H. W. Bush and George W. Bush.

== See also ==
- American Enterprise Institute
- Committee on the Present Danger
