= Linkage (policy) =

Cold War-era American policy

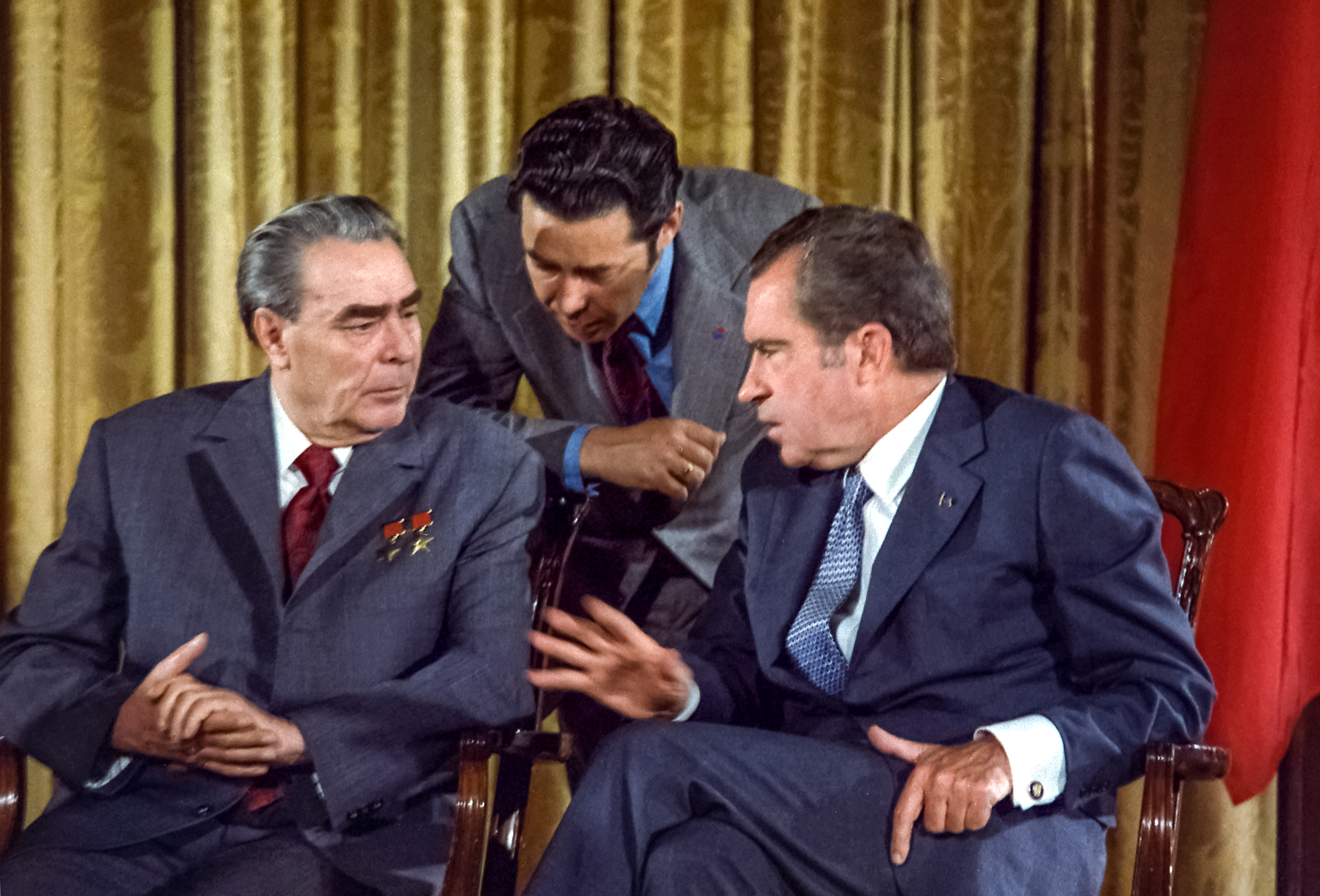
Leonid Brezhnev (representing the Soviet Union) and Richard Nixon (representing the United States) in talks in 1973

Linkage was a foreign policy that was pursued by the United States and championed by Richard Nixon and Henry Kissinger in the 1970s détente, during the Cold War. The policy aimed to persuade the Soviet Union to co-operate in restraining revolutions in the Third World in return for concessions in nuclear and economic fields. Soviet interventions occurred in various conflicts such as the Angolan Civil War, the Mozambican Civil War, and the Ogaden War, while many revolutions still occurred in Third World countries, undermining the policy.

The premise behind linkage, as a policy, was to connect political and military issues. This established a relationship making progress in area "A" dependent on progress in area "B".

An important aspect of the policy was that deviations from respecting the rights and interests would be punished. The intent of this retaliatory action was to highlight to the offending state the limitations of acceptable international behaviour and demonstrate that attempts at expansion and upsetting international stability would not be accepted. This meant that conflict itself would contribute to stabilising the international order.

The Nixon-Kissinger approach did not link foreign and domestic areas.

Selective relaxation of tensions is an opposing policy to linkage. In that case, an issue of arms control could be addressed and tension diminished, with the status quo being maintained in other strategic areas.

== Different uses of the term ==
There have been different uses of the term ‘linkage’ in reference to both domestic and international policy making. There is often debate over the true meaning of the term. Historians and academics have portrayed the meaning of ‘linkage’ in different lights. Common understandings of the term are that linkage means leverage – the linking of one event to another in order to maintain bargaining power or pressure on the opposing party involved. Another description of linkage comes from Marvin Kalb and Bernard Kalb. They describe linkage as "an up-to-date application of [Henry] Kissinger’s theories about balance of power." Specific types of linkages can be coercive or cooperative. They can also be prospective, such as promises or threats, and they can be retrospective, such as rewards or retaliation.

Since the 1970s, the term has been used to make reference to the influence and manipulation of US-Soviet and east–west connections. An example of coercive linkage policy would be the US seeking to tie arms control progress to what they thought was acceptable behaviour in the Third World. This was based on the assumption that the Soviet Union wanted arms control more than the US did.

== The politics of linkage ==
There are multiple theories behind linkage politics. The basic differences behind these theories are that the parties involved are either different or similar – with respect to their issue positions.

For those parties that are different, the politics of linkage are based on the assumption that governments or parties involved make decisions as trade-offs. Linkage is "established by the players’ beliefs that cooperative behaviour in one setting influences the prospects for cooperation in other settings." By connecting events or issues that are not necessarily connected in a particular way, governments can boost their political and economic situations by surrendering less important issues for those that have a greater, all-round importance.

For those parties that are similar, linkage politics are based on the observation that mutually beneficial exchange is more prevalent between similar countries. One country would link positive incentives (such as technology transfers and arms control) to the expectation of the other country’s cooperation requital. With similar issues, it becomes more about bargaining power and convincing the other country involved that they are receiving something worthwhile in return.

== Origin and setting ==
Linkage policy became significant during the time of détente during the Cold War. This meant a relaxing of tensions, mainly between the East and the West. By 1971, the newly established Soviet leader Leonid Brezhnev was ready to accept US ideas about relaxing tensions. This was for a number of reasons. The Soviet Union had issues with the Czechoslovak Communist party in 1968 when their leader, Alexander Dubček, created reforms encouraging free speech and democracy. This began a wave of demonstrations that promoted liberalisation, called the Prague Spring. On August 20, the USSR invaded Czechoslovakia to undo the reforms taking place. This created the Brezhnev Doctrine, which gave the Soviet Union its own right to intervene against counterrevolutionary behaviour. Fearing that this might apply to them, China provoked and engaged in conflict with the Soviets. Such conflicts forced the Soviets to scale back aggressiveness and "repair [their] image in the wake of the Prague Spring." The fear of having poor relations with both the US and China was an incentive for the Soviets to seek détente. Other incentives included the need for agricultural imports and access to better Western technology.

The US and Soviet Union saw détente differently. The US saw détente as an encouragement of changes in Soviet Union domestic and foreign policy. The Soviets saw détente as influencing only foreign policy, not domestic issues. What they did have in common was a shared interest in avoiding a nuclear war. They were also in agreement that east–west competition would continue during this period of relaxed tensions. The problem arose when there was a lack of clarity in terms of how détente would affect Third World involvement. The US mainly had issues with Soviet foreign policy in these areas. Henry Kissinger (US Secretary of State at the time) believed there were areas of congruent interests which would help to regulate competition between the US and the Soviet Union.

== Nixon-Ford era (1969-1977) ==
During the Presidencies of both Richard Nixon and Gerald Ford, linkage diplomacy was used as a key foreign policy measure. It was particularly aimed at the Soviet Union. Henry Kissinger, who was Nixon's National Security Advisor, said that the aim of this policy was to "free [American] foreign policy from oscillations between overextension and isolation and to ground it in a firm conception of the national interest."

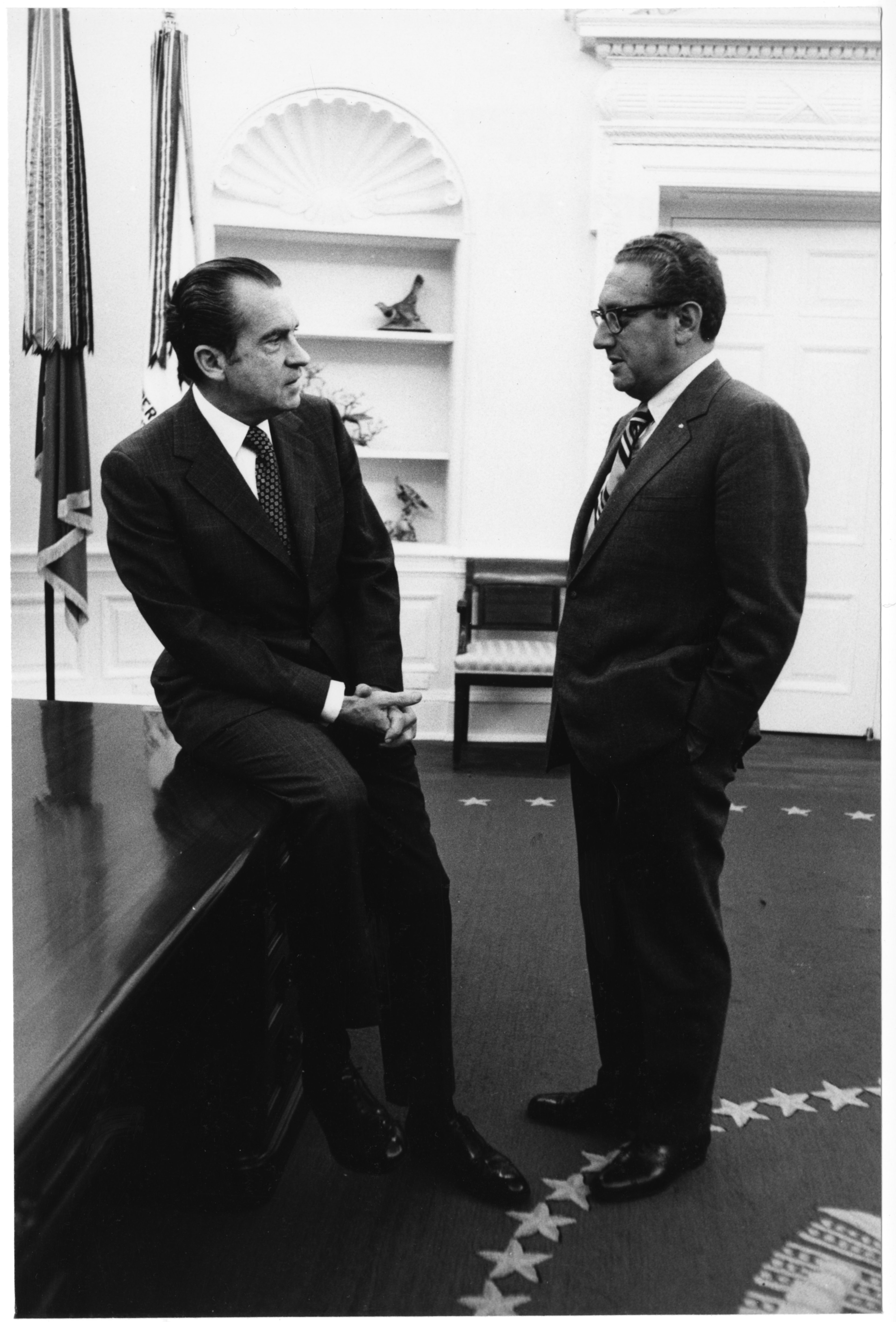
Richard Nixon (left) and Henry Kissinger (right) pictured together in February 1972, a few months before the signing of the SALT I agreement

Following the signing of the Strategic Arms Limitation Talks (SALT) agreement in 1972, both the US and the Soviet Union agreed to practise mutual restraint. The terms of the agreement were vague. This meant that Nixon and Kissinger interpreted it as a justification of their own actions. As a result of this, part of this administrations perception of linkage was to convince Soviet leaders that they would have motivation for moderation, and also punishment for a contradiction of the previous agreements they had signed.

Nixon and Kissinger also wanted to tie linkage to trade. As trade ties between the US and the Soviet Union increased, Kissinger aimed to convert these connections into political advantages. They wanted to make economic cooperation contingent on the evidence of progress in US foreign policy matters. If the Soviet Union made exceptions to issues they had with US foreign policy, the United States would grant them the most favoured nation (MFN) status. This administration aimed to use the growing economic relationship with the USSR as a "carrot for Soviet political behaviour."

Congressional intervention made it difficult for Nixon and Kissinger to implement linkage policy in the way they wanted to. The trade agreement that Nixon and Kissinger established was amended in 1974 under the Jackson-Vanik amendment. This linked the granting of the MFN status, instead, with increased Jewish emigration from the USSR. Such terms were found to be humiliating and unacceptable on the part of the Soviet Union. This made it difficult to finalise the agreement. Raymond Garthoff (US treaty adviser and former US ambassador to Bulgaria) said that the intervention by Congress spoiled Soviet expectations of economic benefits that had been promised by the Nixon government by making them dependent on Soviet internal affairs. Kissinger objected the intervention from Congress as he believed foreign issues are better resolved quietly than publicly in Congress. The success of quiet diplomacy can be seen in the following fact: in 1968 only 400 Jews were allowed to emigrate, but in 1973, nearly 35,000 were allowed to emigrate.

Nixon and Kissinger were secretive in their policymaking. This was because they were suspicious of the bureaucracy. Decisions were made without the knowledge of William Rogers, who was the secretary of State at the time and responsible for the management of US diplomacy. Congress also grew suspicious and played a role in foreign policy as well. This secrecy and conflicting ideas made it difficult to gain concessions and make progress in foreign policy.

== Jimmy Carter era (1977–1981) ==
While Nixon had the idea of championing Linkage policy during his time as president, Carter did not believe that linkage policy was the answer to cooling Soviet tensions early on in his presidency. He believed that the majority of his country's international concerns stemmed from the confrontational relationship between the US and the Soviet Union. This view was backed by the US Secretary of state Cyrus Vance. Carter also had no desire to engage in issues related to Soviet engagement in the Third World. Carter's National Security Advisor, Zbigniew Brzezinski, held a different view. He supported the employment of linkage diplomacy. Brzezinski believed that the correct answer to Soviet actions in the Third World was a "carefully calibrated policy of simultaneous competition and cooperation of its own, designed to promote a more comprehensive and more reciprocal détente."

In 1978 Brzezinski strove to link developments in the SALT II negotiations to revised Soviet behaviour in Africa. The Ogaden War took place in 1977-78 between Ethiopia and Somalia. The US had previously been allied to Ethiopia, and the Soviet Union to Somalia. The Soviets had recently started constructing a military presence in Ethiopia, despite the US’ previously established relationship. After efforts of mediation from the Soviet Union failed, Somalia cut all ties and its friendship treaty with the USSR in 1977. The Soviet Union increased its presence by sending 10,000 soldiers into the country by early 1978. Soviet involvement in this conflict created a setback in the US attempts to deal with instability in the third world, especially Africa. Following this, Brzezinski called for the delay of SALT II negotiations in retaliation. This would continue until the USSR complied with what the US perceived as acceptable conduct in the Third World.

Vance tried to dampen the usage of linkage diplomacy. He suggested that a more suitable approach would be to accept that the US and the Soviet Union have competition, but not link Third World behaviour with important issues such as the SALT agreements. President Carter did not reject this, but said that the abuse of human rights and involvement in Africa would make it difficult to ratify the SALT agreement.

In December 1979, the Soviet Union intervened in Afghanistan. The intervention was considered a "blatant violation of accepted international rules of behaviour" by Carter. Another concern was the fall of the Shah in Iran in early 1979, and the perceived inability of the Carter administration to free the American hostages held there. This largely affected US policy and according to Brzezinski, led to the demise of détente.

Carter's national security advisor, Brzezinski, believed that the Soviets found a sense of confidence and were emboldened by the US failure to react strongly to the USSR intervention of the Horn in 1978. He mentioned that this allowed them to be more aggressive in their foreign policy without the risk of US punishment. He believed linkage policy should have been developed and used more consistently throughout Carter's term as president. If this happened, the Soviets would have been less adventurous in their exploration of the Third World, and the SALT negotiations could have been saved. Following this, the US imposed sanctions on the Soviet Union including a grain embargo and a ban on the transfer of technology.

== Looking back after the Cold War ==
There are multiple arguments as to whether linkage diplomacy had achieved its objectives by the end of the Cold War. Samuel Makinda states three reasons against the success of linkage policy. These include conceptual problems, unsolicited interference in Soviet internal affairs, and Soviet intervention due to American disenchantment.

=== Conceptual problems ===
The Basic Principles agreement was the basis on which Linkage policy was first imposed. The agreement was vague and not very specific. This meant that each country interpreted the agreement in their own way. This was the conceptual problem. For example, the US wanted ‘unilateral advantage’ in the Middle East but did not involve the Soviet Union in the Egyptian-Israeli peace process. But when the Soviets wanted ‘unilateral advantage’ in Africa, the US wanted to punish them.

=== Soviet internal affairs ===
The US wanted to link their own issues with Soviet domestic policies. The SALT I agreement between the US and the Soviet Union in 1972 and the Basic Principles Agreement did not involve issues related to domestic policies. When the US did attempt to affect domestic policy in the Soviet Union, the Soviet leaders regarded it as interfering in their internal affairs in an attempt to undermine their leadership.

=== Disenchantment with the US ===
The US had disenchanted some countries in its attempt to deal with perceived Soviet aggressiveness and expansion. For example, Ethiopia became disenchanted after developments in the Ogaden War. Angola also became disenchanted because they could not get US support due to their ideological inclinations. This meant that Soviet intervention in Africa was partly because these disenchanted countries invited them.

== See also ==
- Appeasement
- Containment
- Détente
- Domino theory
- Dual containment (Iran-Iraq containment)
- Marshall Plan
- Rollback
- Truman Doctrine

== Sources ==
- Diplomacy by Henry Kissinger (1994) ISBN 0-671-65991-X, pp 716–721
- Kissinger: A Biography by Walter Isaacson (1992) ISBN 0-671-66323-2
