= Religious responses to the problem of evil =

Religious responses to the problem of evil are concerned with reconciling the existence of evil and suffering with an omnipotent, omnibenevolent, and omniscient God. An argument that attempts to resolve the problem of evil is known as a theodicy.

The problem of evil is acute in monotheistic religions such as Christianity, Islam, and Judaism whose religion is based on such a God. However, the question of "why does evil exist?" has also been studied in religions that are non-theistic or polytheistic, such as Buddhism, Hinduism, and Jainism. In most theological discussions, evil is defined in a broad manner as any and all pain and suffering, but religion also uses a narrow definition that says evil involves only horrific acts committed by an independent moral agent and does not include all wrongs or harm, including that from nature.

The problem of evil is formulated as either a logical problem that highlights an incompatibility between some characteristic of God and evil or as an evidential problem that attempts to show that evidence of evil outweighs the evidence of an omnipotent, omniscient, and wholly good God.

== Definitions ==
=== Evil ===
A broad concept of evil defines it as any and all pain and suffering. While many of the ways to construct the problem of evil are based on the broad definition of evil, "most contemporary philosophers interested in the nature of evil are primarily concerned with evil in a narrower sense." The narrow concept of evil involves moral condemnation and is applicable only to moral agents capable of making independent decisions and their actions; it allows for the existence of some pain and suffering without identifying it as evil. It has been suggested that the term evil cannot be used to describe ordinary wrongdoing because "there is a qualitative and not merely a quantitative difference between evil acts and other wrongful ones; evil acts are not just very bad or wrongful acts, but rather ones possessing some specially horrific quality."

=== Logical problem of evil ===
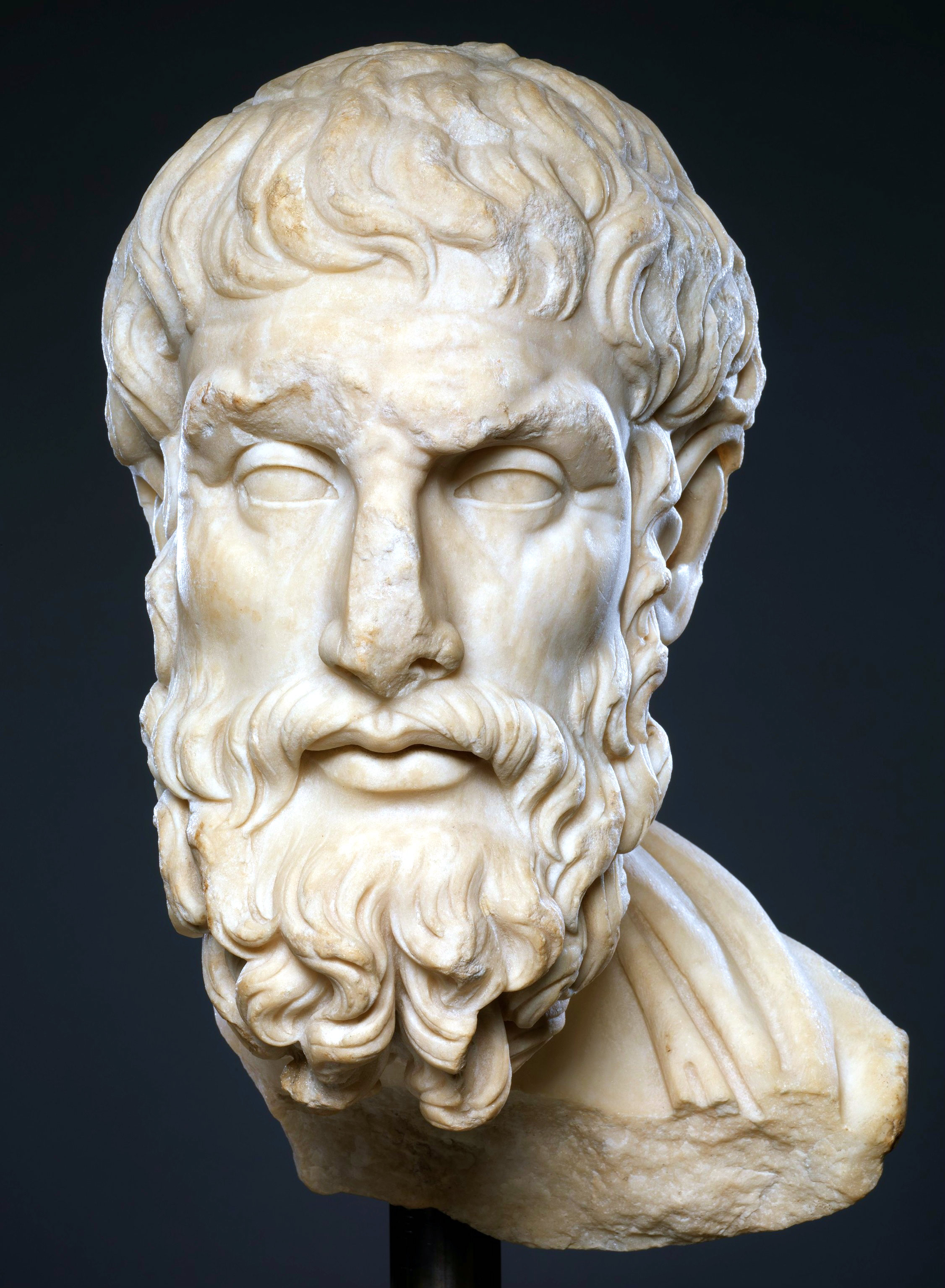
Marble head of Epicurus

The earliest formulation of the problem of evil dates back to the Greek philosopher Epicurus; (Note: According to Mark Joseph Larrimore, the formulation may have been wrongly attributed to Epicurus by Lactantius, who, from his Christian perspective, regarded Epicurus as an atheist.) David Hume paraphrased it as follows: "Is [God] willing to prevent evil, but not able? Then he is impotent. Is he able, but not willing? Then he is malevolent. Is he both able and willing? Whence then is evil?"

The logical argument from evil is as follows:

1. If an omnipotent, omnibenevolent, and omniscient god exists, then evil does not.
2. There is evil in the world.
3. Therefore, an omnipotent, omnibenevolent, and omniscient god does not exist.

=== Evidential problem of evil ===
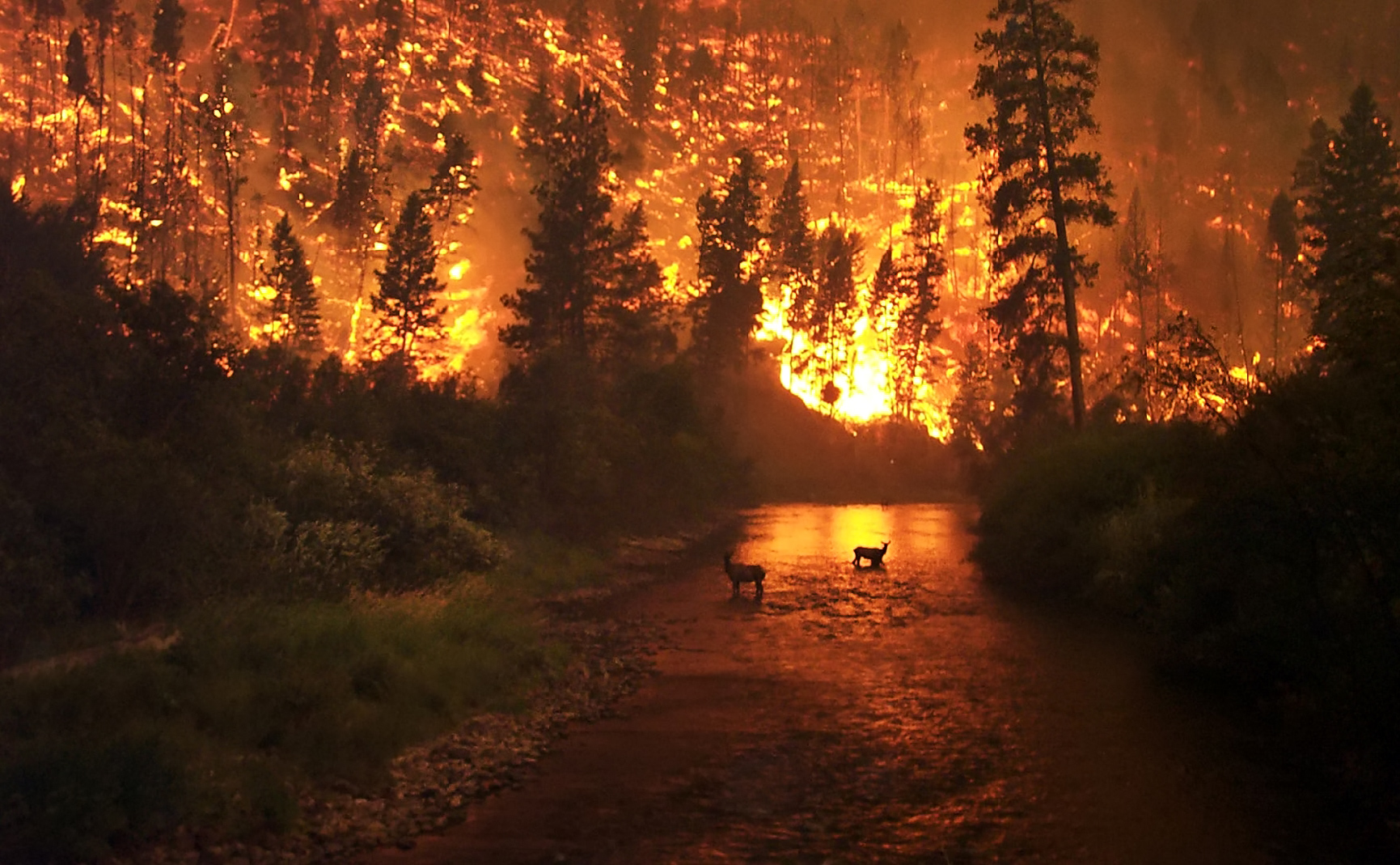
William L. Rowe's example of natural evil: "In some distant forest lightning strikes a dead tree, resulting in a forest fire. In the fire a fawn is trapped, horribly burned, and lies in terrible agony for several days before death relieves its suffering."

The evidential problem of evil (also referred to as the probabilistic or inductive version of the problem) seeks to show that the existence of evil, although logically consistent with the existence of God, counts against or lowers the probability of the truth of theism. Both absolute versions and relative versions of the evidential problems of evil are presented below.

A version by William L. Rowe:

1. There exist instances of intense suffering which an omnipotent, omniscient being could have prevented without thereby losing some greater good or permitting some evil equally bad or worse.
2. An omniscient, wholly good being would prevent the occurrence of any intense suffering it could, unless it could not do so without thereby losing some greater good or permitting some evil equally bad or worse.
3. Therefore, an omnipotent, omniscient, wholly good being does not exist.

Another by Paul Draper:

1. If world's terrible evil and suffering fit far better with naturalism than they do with theism, then we have strong prima facie reasons to accept naturalism over theism.
2. World's terrible evil and suffering fit far better with naturalism.
3. Therefore, we have strong prima facie reasons to accept naturalism over theism.

=== Theodicy ===
As defined by Alvin Plantinga, a theodicy is "an answer to the question of why God permits evil". Theodicy is defined as a theological construct that attempts to vindicate God in response to the problem of evil. Another definition of theodicy is the vindication of divine goodness and providence in view of the existence of evil. The word theodicy derives from the Greek words Θεός, Theos, and δίκη, dikē. Theos is translated as "God" and dikē can be translated as either "trial" or "judgment". Thus, 'theodicy' literally means "justifying God". Unlike a defense, which merely tries to demonstrate that the coexistence of God and evil is logically possible, a theodicy additionally provides a framework wherein God and evil's existence is considered plausible.

== Ancient Greek religion ==
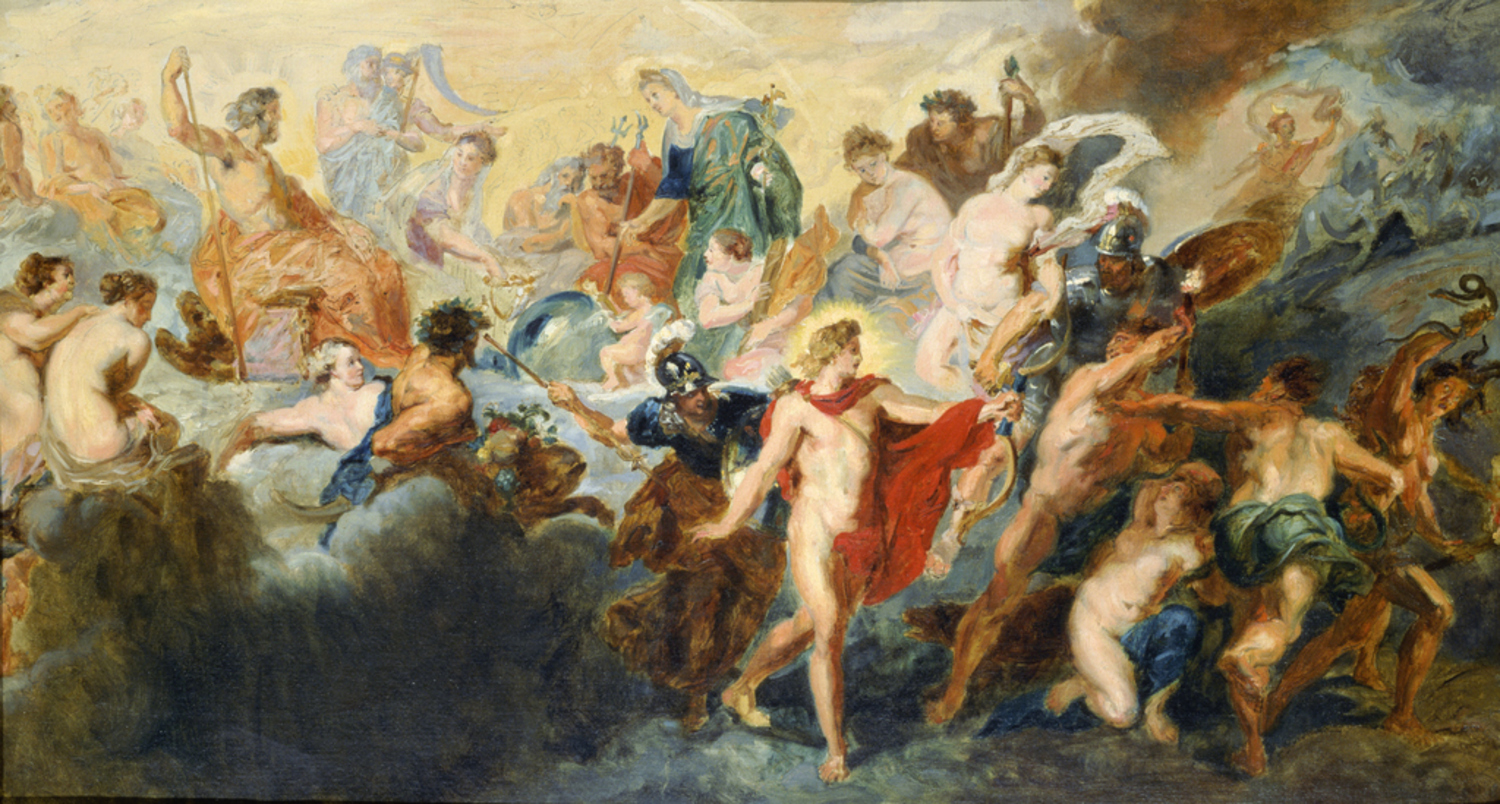
Greek gods depicted by Pierre-Auguste Renoir

The gods in the Ancient Greek religion were seen as superior, but they shared similar traits with humans and often interacted with them. Gods often meddled in the affairs of men, and sometimes their actions consisted of bringing misery to people; for example, gods would sometimes be a direct cause of death for people. However, the Greeks did not consider the gods to be evil as a result of their actions. Instead, the answer to most situations in Greek mythology was the power of fate. Fate is considered to be more powerful than the gods themselves, and for this reason, no one can escape it. For this reason, the Greeks recognized that unfortunate events were justifiable because of fate.

Later, Greek and Roman theologians and philosophers discussed the problem of evil in depth. Starting at least with Plato, philosophers tended to reject or de-emphasize literal interpretations of mythology in favor of a more pantheistic, natural theology based on reasoned arguments. In this framework, stories that seemed to impute dishonorable conduct to the gods were often simply dismissed as false and as being nothing more than the "imagination of poets." Greek and Roman thinkers continued to wrestle, however, with the problems of natural evil and of evil that we observe in our day-to-day experience. Influential Roman writers, such as Cicero (De Natura Deorum) and Seneca (De Providentia), drawing on earlier work by the Greek philosophers such as the Stoics, developed many arguments in defense of the righteousness of the gods.

== Buddhism ==
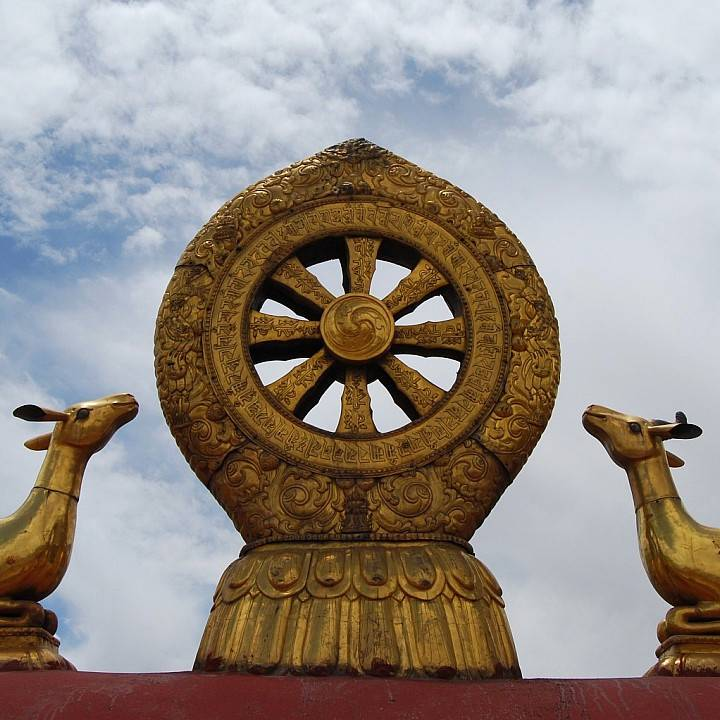
The eight spoke Dharma wheel symbolizes the Noble Eightfold Path.

Buddhist teachings acknowledge evil and suffering in the world. Buddhists believe that evil is expressed in actions and states of mind, such as cruelty, murder, theft, and avarice, which are a result of the three poisons: greed, hatred, and delusion. The precepts and practices of Buddhism, such as the Four Noble Truths and the Noble Eightfold Path, aim to empower a follower in gaining insights and liberation from the cycle of such suffering as well as rebirth.

Some strands of Mahayana Buddhism developed a theory of Buddha-nature in texts such as the Tathagata-garbha Sutras composed in 3rd-century south India, which is very similar to the "soul, self" theory found in classical Hinduism. The Tathagata-garbha theory leads to a Buddhist version of the problem of evil, states Peter Harvey, because the theory claims that every human being has an intrinsically pure inner Buddha, which is good. This premise leads to the question as to why anyone does any evil and why the "intrinsically pure inner Buddha" does not attempt or prevail in preventing the evil actor before they commit the evil. One response has been that the Buddha-nature is omnibenevolent but not omnipotent. Further, the Tathagata-garbha Sutras are atypical texts of Buddhism because they contradict the Anatta doctrines in a vast majority of Buddhist texts, leading scholars to posit that the Tathagata-garbha Sutras were written to promote Buddhism to non-Buddhists and that they do not represent mainstream Buddhism.

Mainstream Buddhism, since its early development, did not need to address a theological problem of evil as it saw no need for a creator of the universe and asserted instead, like many Indian traditions, that the universe never had a beginning and all existence is an endless cycle of rebirths.

== Christianity ==
=== The Bible ===
The Bible does not have a singular perspective on evil. Consequently, the Bible focuses on moral and spiritual remedies, not rational or logical justifications. Suffering in the Bible is represented in at least twelve different ways:

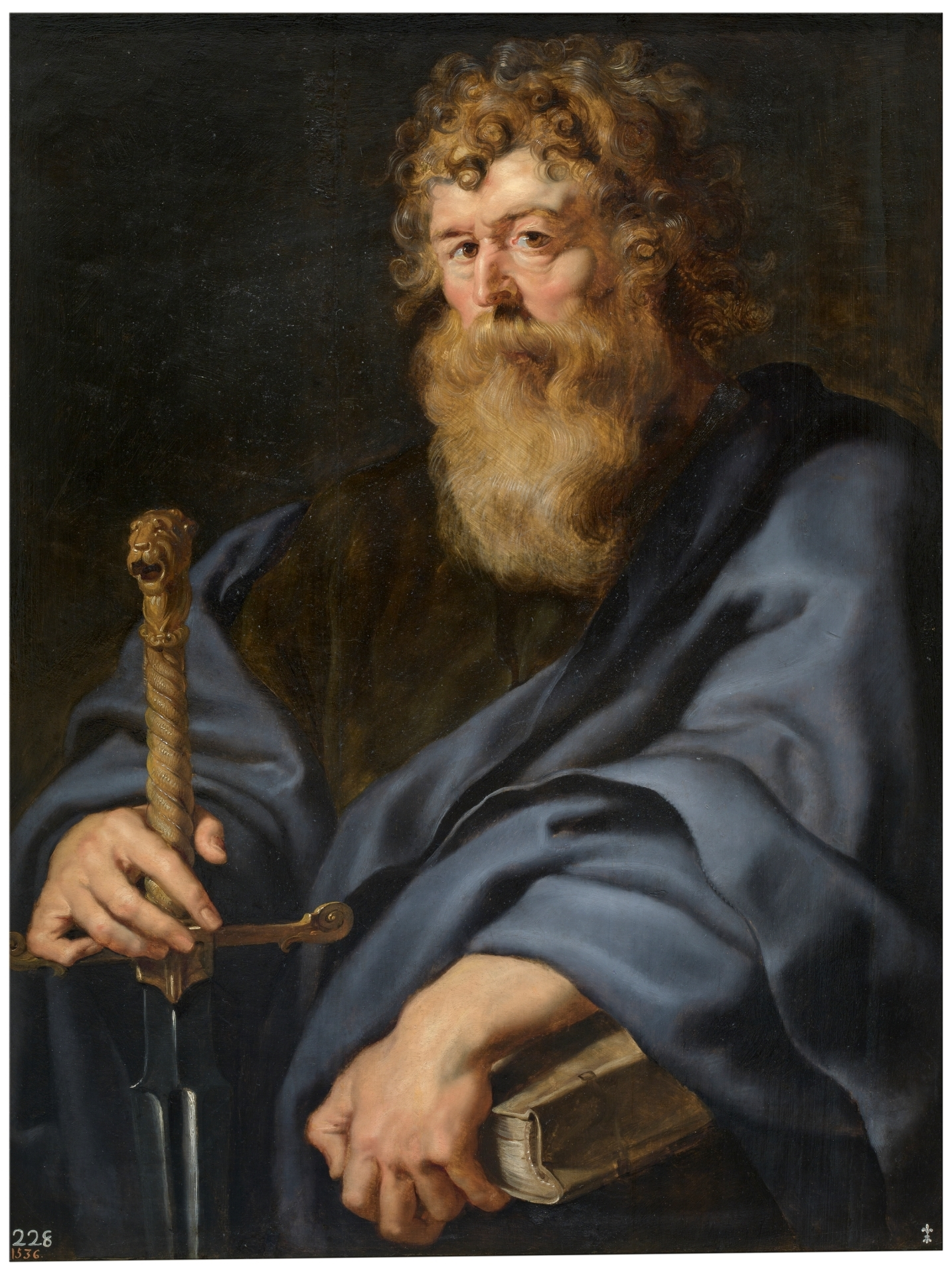
Saint Paul holding a blade

1. Deuteronomy 30 and Hebrews 12 open the possibilities that suffering may be from God as punishment, natural consequences, or God's loving discipline.
2. Genesis 4:1–8 and the murder of Abel suggest much suffering is the result of individual choices.
3. Genesis 45 says God's redemptive power is stronger than suffering; therefore, suffering can be used to further good purposes.
4. Luke 22:31–34 says resist the fear and despair that accompany suffering, instead believe that God has the power to help.
5. Job 40 says God is not like humans but wants a relationship with all of them, which requires some surrender to God and acceptance of suffering.
6. Romans 8:18–30 shows that suffering is temporary and set within the context of God's eternal purposes.
7. Hebrews 12:1–6 sets suffering within the concept of "soul-making," as do 2 Peter 1:5–8, James 1, and others.
8. Exodus 17:1–7 (and the Book of Job) characterize suffering as testing and speak of God's right to test human loyalty.
9. 2 Corinthians 4:7–12 says human weakness during suffering reveals God's strength and that it is part of the believer's calling to embrace suffering in solidarity with Christ.
10. 2 Corinthians 1:3–7 says God is the comforter and that people learn how to better comfort others when they have personal experience of suffering.
11. The hymn in Philippians 2 invites the reader to join Christ in suffering for the sake of others, so that they might also share in his glory.
12. Colossians 1:24 says human suffering participates in God's own suffering as it unfolds in the already and not yet of the kingdom of God.

Suffering and misfortune are sometimes represented as evil in the Bible, yet Christianity is based on "the salvific value of suffering." Paul the Apostle and Barnabas in Acts 14:22 say that Christians "must endure many hardships to enter the kingdom of God." Paul also says that God permitted him to bear sufferings beyond his strength endurance in order to teach Paul to trust more in God.

=== Early responses ===
==== Irenaean theodicy ====
The Irenaean (or soul-making) theodicy is named after the 2nd-century Greek theologian Irenaeus, whose ideas were adopted in Eastern Christianity. Irenaean theodicy stands in sharp contrast to the Augustinian theodicy. For Augustine, humans were created perfect, but after the fall of man, their nature became corrupted. For Irenaeus, humans were not created perfect, but instead, must strive continuously to move closer to perfection.

Irenaeus saw the purpose of the world in the development of the moral character of humans, and believed that a good world would be best suited to that purpose. Irenaeus believed that this world would include suffering and evil to help people draw closer to God. He perceived God's declaration in the Book of Genesis that his creation was good to mean that the world is fit for purpose, as opposed to free from suffering. To illustrate the benefits of suffering, Irenaeus cited the Book of Jonah. He explained that Jonah's suffering, being swallowed by a whale, both enabled God's plan to be fulfilled and also brought Jonah closer to God: Jonah repented for his sin and the people of Nineveh turned to God.

The soul-making theodicy has been modified and advocated in the twenty-first century by John Hick. He claimed that one who has attained to goodness by meeting and eventually mastering temptation, and thus by rightly making responsible choices in concrete situations, is good in a richer and more valuable sense than would be one created ab initio in a state either of innocence or of virtue. In the former case, according to Hick, the individual's goodness has within it the strength of temptations overcome, a stability based upon an accumulation of right choices, and a positive and responsible character that comes from the investment of costly personal effort. Additionally, Hick argued that for suffering to have soul-making value, "human effort and development must be present at every stage of existence, including the afterlife."

==== Privation theory of evil ====
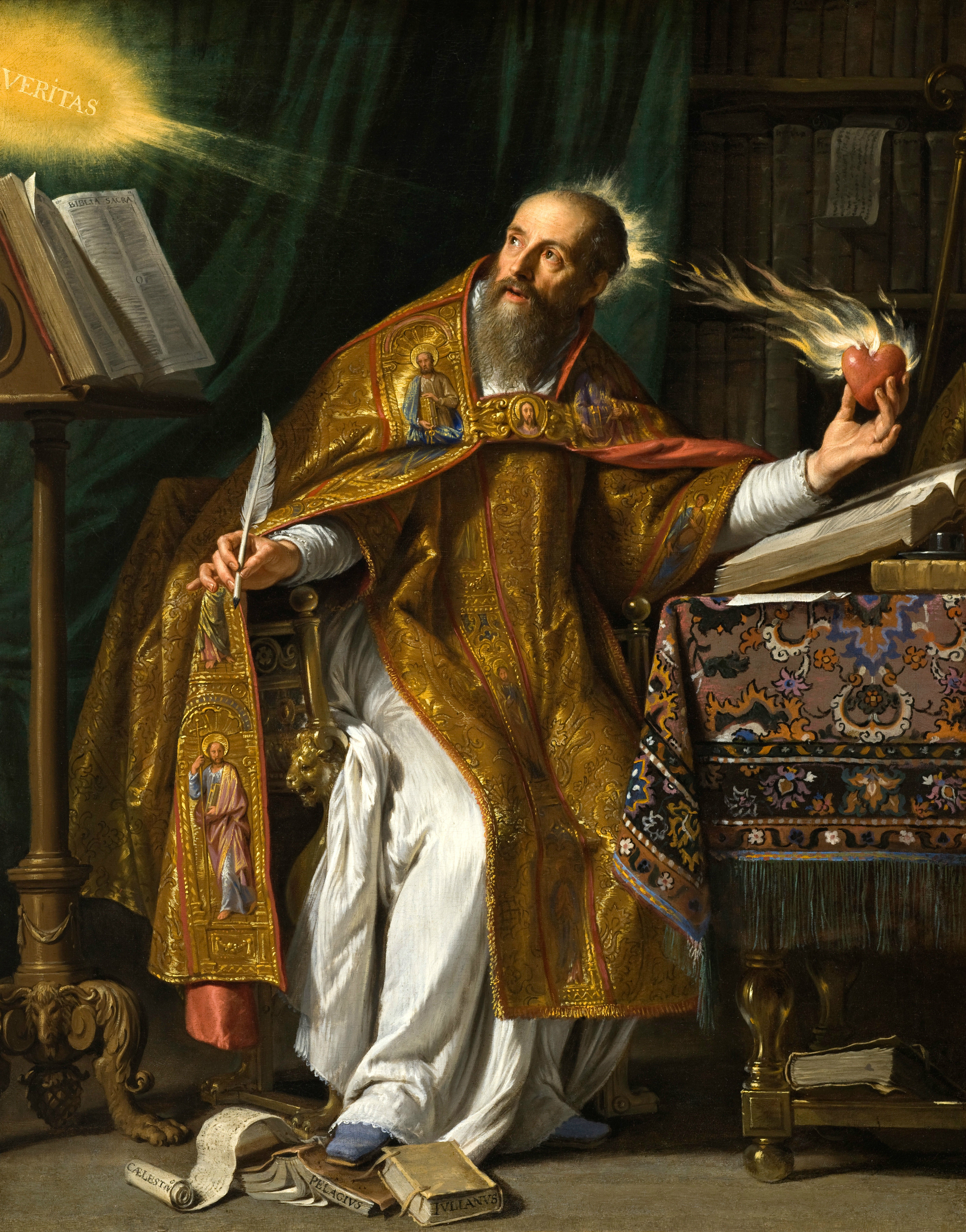
Saint Augustine pictured by Philippe de Champaigne

Saint Augustine of Hippo grappled with the problem of evil both before and after his conversion to Christianity. After his conversion, Augustine came to view God as a spiritual, not corporeal, being who is sovereign over other lesser beings, based on God having created all material reality ex nihilo. Augustine's view of evil relies on the causal principle which states that every cause is superior to its effects. According to him, God is innately superior to his creation, and everything that God creates is good. Every creature is good, but "some are better than others" Created beings, however, are also subject to prejudices that come from a personal perspective: humans care about what affects themselves and fail to see how their privation might contribute to the common good. For Augustine, evil refers to a privation or an absence of goodness. This absence of good is an act of the will, "a culpable rejection of the infinite bounty God offers in favor of an infinitely inferior fare," freely chosen by the will of an individual.

Saint Thomas Aquinas systematized the Augustinian conception of evil, supplementing it with his own musings. According to Saint Thomas, evil is a privation, or "the absence of some good which belongs properly to the nature of the creature." Therefore, for Aquinas, there is no ontological source of evil that corresponds to the greater good, which is God. Saint Thomas believed that evil exists as a subjective conception, as opposed to an objective fact. He believed that things are evil not in themselves, but because of their relation to other items or persons. All realities, according to Aquinas, are themselves functional; they produce bad results incidentally. Consequently, he claimed that the final cause of evil is fundamental "goodness."

==== Original sin theodicy ====
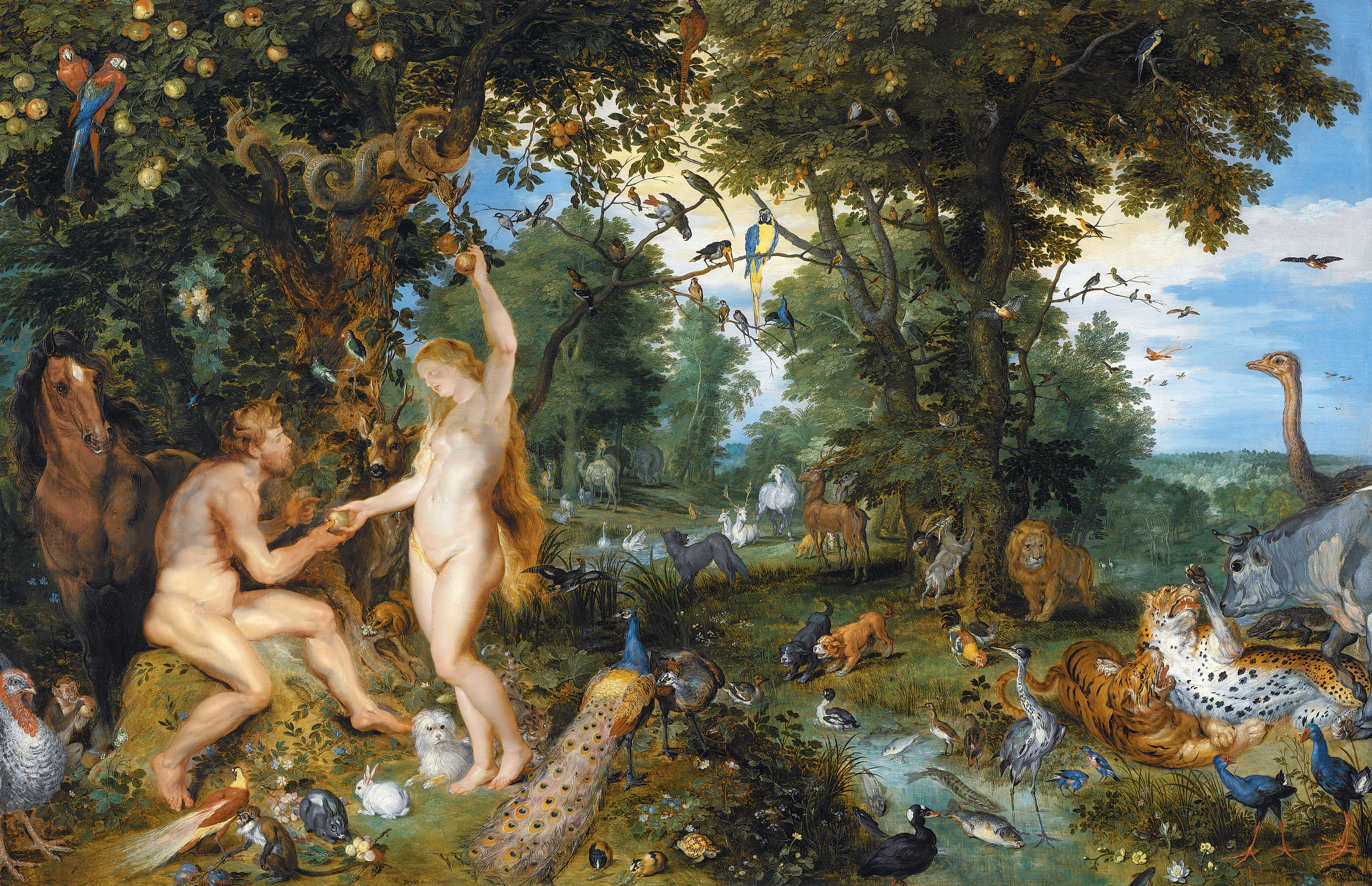
Depiction of the original sin of Adam and Eve

In Christian theology, original sin is the term used to describe the sin of Adam and Eve, the progenitors of humanity. With the fall of man, they lost sanctifying grace and communion with God. Original sin hinges on the participation of humanity in the same human nature of Adam and Eve rather than in the participation in their actual sin.

John Calvin explained evil as a consequence of the fall of man and the original sin. Calvin, however, held to the belief in predestination and believed that the fall was part of God's plan.

Martin Luther saw evil and original sin as an inheritance from Adam and Eve. He believed that it was passed on to all humans from their conception. According to Luther, God's just nature allowed sin as a consequence of human distrust, even though God planned humanity's redemption through Jesus Christ.

=== Contemporary responses ===
Contemporary Christian responses to the problem of evil take one, or some combination, of four general approaches (five if one counts the anti-theodicy position as a theodicy). The first can be called the protological approach. It asserts God's decisions and actions at creation are reconcilable with omnibenevolence despite the many and often horrendous evils that have come as a result. Alvin Plantinga, Richard Swinburne, and Eleonore Stump have markedly different theodicies but all have their primary focus on "God as maker of Heaven and Earth" doing the best, most loving thing by creating humans and the world as it exists. David Ray Griffin and John Hick also have substantial protological elements in their theodicies.

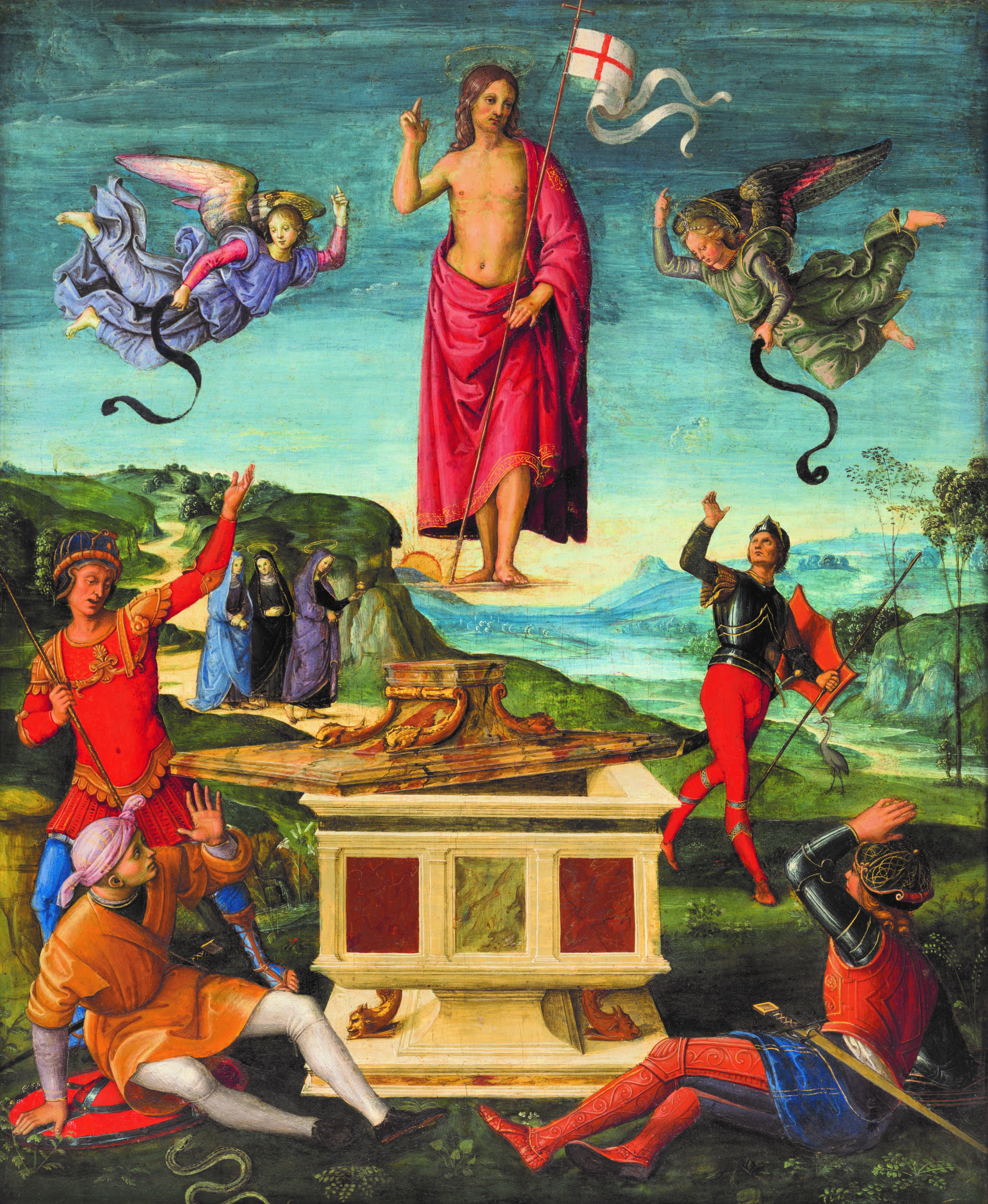
Resurrection of Jesus Christ illustrated

Jürgen Moltmann, René Girard, Pope John Paul II, Marilyn McCord Adams, and James Cone all have versions of the traditional Christological approach to the problem of evil. John Paul and Adams speak of the "horrors" of existence becoming "secure points of identification with the crucified God." Moltmann says Jesus' suffering was so profound it changed God, just as profound suffering changes the humans who endure it. René Girard's "unique claim is that Christ's death has once-and-for-all unmasked the cycle of violence and victimization that has existed 'since the foundation of the world.'" Black theologian James Cone says that, through Jesus' immersion in human suffering, God's identity is found among those who suffer.

The enestological solution, based on process theology, stresses the ongoing presence of God as a benevolent providence who constantly works to persuade human beings to choose good but does not unilaterally intervene to force them as a despot would. It has become a particularly influential view in the contemporary period through the work of a number of feminist theologians, such as Wendy Farley and Cheryl Kirk-Duggan, as well as to the majority of those who hold to the "anti-theodicy" position, such as Sarah Pinnock. Marjorie Suchocki and John Hick use process theology to emphasize the "here and now" of God while also having strong protological and eschatological elements in their approaches, but it was David Griffin' who offered the first "full-scale treatment of the problem of evil written from the perspective of 'process' philosophical and theological thought." Griffin builds on Whitehead's view that God is not alone in having "power, creativity, and self-determination," asserting that "God has no hands but our hands."

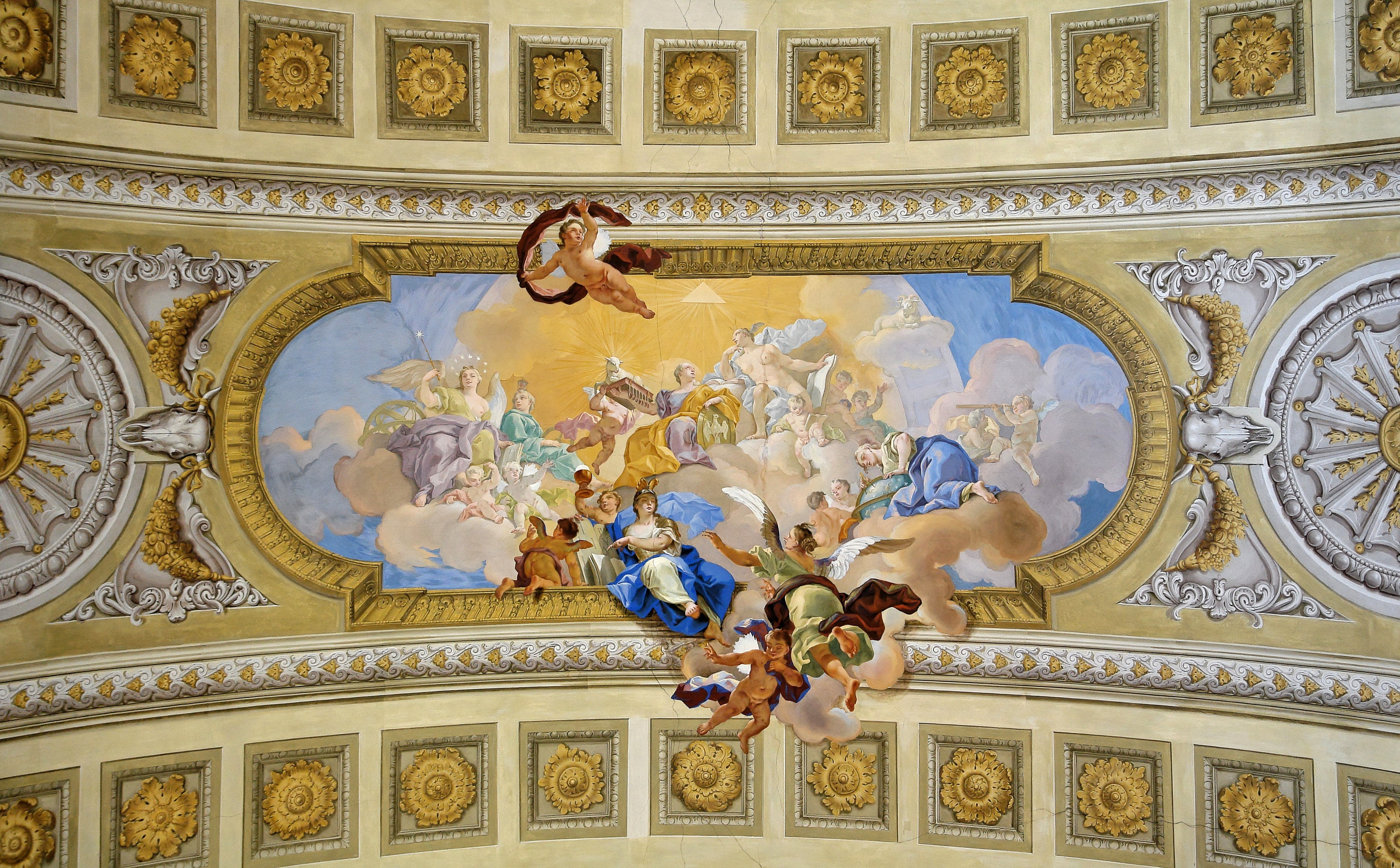
Allegory of peace and heaven by Daniel Gran

Marjorie Suchocki asserts the need for an eschatological aspect to create a complete Christian theodicy. This approach has been the particular focus and emphasis of John Hick's writings. Hick asserts that "the question of immortality ... is an essential basis for any view which could count towards a solution of the theological problem of human suffering." Hick holds that moral goodness is only gradually achieved and that, because it is obtained through suffering and struggle, it is of greater value than a preprogrammed virtue God might have enacted at creation. For Hick, this soul-making must continue after death, and he adamantly holds to the doctrine of universal salvation. Universal salvation/reconciliation has long been a heavily debated minority view in the West, but it was the common soteriology until Augustine's competing theory of eternal damnation of the fourth century. Hick references the earlier view found in the writings of Irenaeus, and in other Eastern writers, including Origen and Gregory of Nyssa, arguing that "eternal pain [and] unending torment" would render any "Christian theodicy impossible" as it would instantiate an evil that was able to thwart God's benevolence and power.

Finally, James Wetzel writes that Kenneth Surin is representative of an increasing anti-theodicy backlash. For those writing theodicy in the twenty-first century, there is no seamless theory that provides all answers, nor do these contemporary theologians think there should be. "When one considers human lives that have been shattered to the core, and, in the face of these tragedies [addresses] the question "Where is God?" ... we would do well to stand with [poet and Holocaust survivor] Nelly Sachs as she says, 'We really don't know.'" Contemporary theodiceans, such as Alvin Plantinga, describe having doubts about the enterprise of theodicy "in the sense of providing an explanation of precise reasons why there is evil in the world." Instead, they attempt to articulate a defense of theistic belief as logical in the face of remaining questions. For example, Sarah Pinnock asserts that: "Direct contact with God does not answer Job's questions, but it makes meaning, and the acceptance of suffering, possible."

==== Free will defense ====
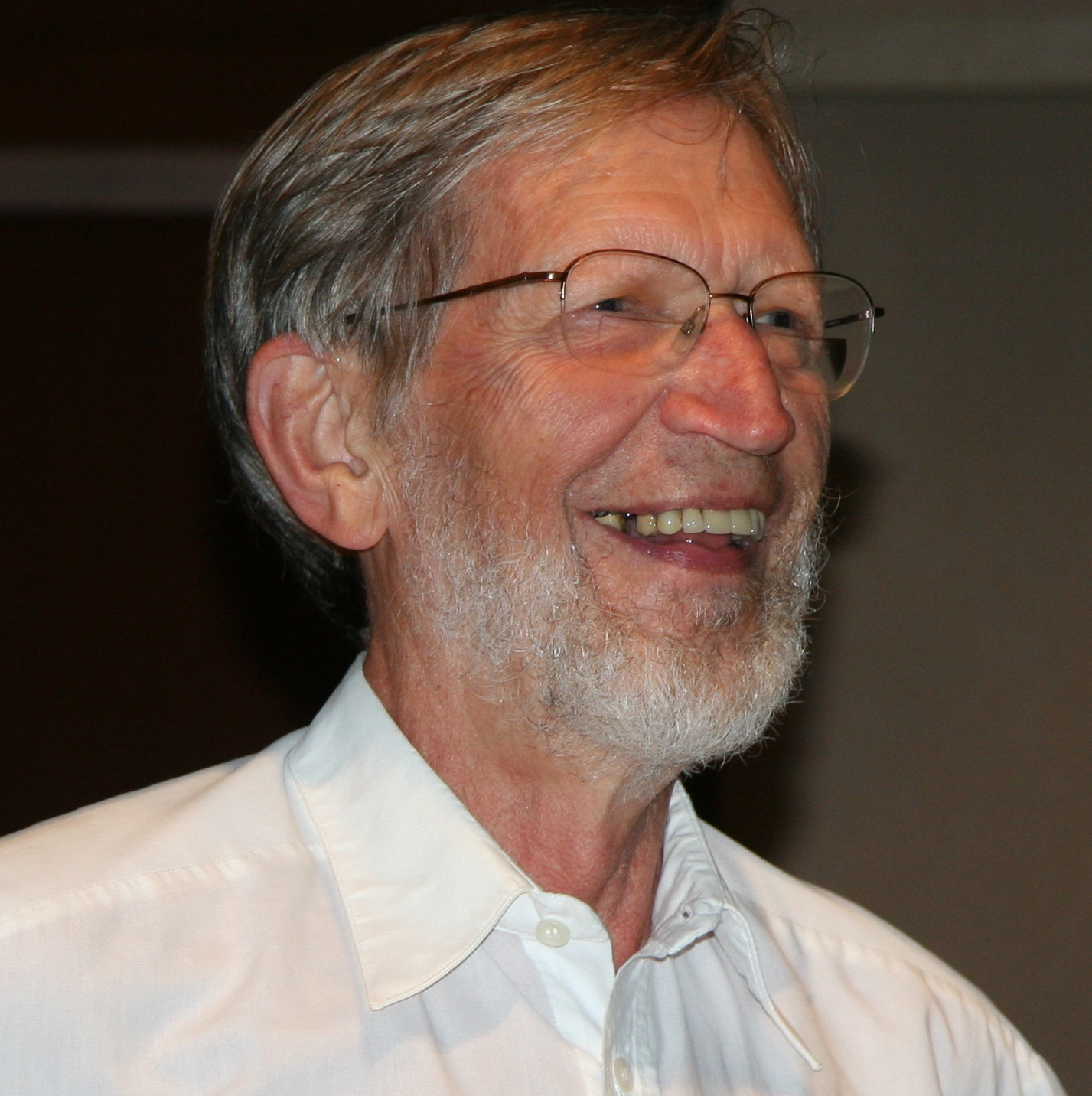
Alvin Plantinga

Plantinga offers a free will defense instead of a theodicy. Plantinga begins with the Leibnizian supposition that there were innumerable possible worlds, some with moral good but no moral evil, available to God before creation. We live in the actual world (the world God actualized), but God could have chosen to create (actualize) any of the possibilities. The catch, Plantinga says, is that it is possible that factors within the possible worlds themselves prevented God from actualizing any of those worlds with moral goodness and no moral evil. Plantinga refers to these factors as the nature of "human essences" and "transworld depravity." Across the various possible worlds (transworld) are all the variations of possible humans, each with their own "human essence" (identity): core properties essential to each person that makes them who they are and distinguishes them from others. Every person is the instantiation of such an essence.

This "transworld identity" varies in detail but not in essence from world to world. This might include variations of a person (X) who always chooses right in some worlds. If somewhere, in some world, (X) ever freely chooses wrong, then the other possible worlds of only goodness could not be actualized and still leave (X) fully free. There might be numerous possible worlds that contained (X) doing only morally good things, but these would not be worlds that God could bring into being because (X) effectively eliminated those options through free action in other possible worlds. (X)'s free choice determined the world available for God to create. An all-knowing God would know "in advance" that there are times when "no matter what circumstances" God places (X) in, as long as God leaves (X) free, (X) will make at least one bad choice. Plantinga terms this "transworld depravity." Therefore, if God wants (X) to be a part of creation and free, then it could mean that the only option such a God would have would be to have an (X) who goes wrong at least once in a world where such wrong is possible. "What is important about transworld depravity is that if a person suffers from it, then it wasn't within God's power to actualize any world in which that person is significantly free but does no wrong."

Plantinga extends this to all human agents, noting, "clearly it is possible that everybody suffers from transworld depravity." This means creating a world with moral good, no moral evil, and truly free persons was not an option available to God. The only way to have a world free of moral evil would be "by creating one without significantly free persons."

==== Evolutionary theodicy ====
In response to arguments concerning natural evil and the suffering of animals, Christopher Southgate developed a "compound evolutionary theodicy." Robert John Russell summarizes it as beginning with an assertion of the goodness of creation and all sentient creatures. Next, Southgate argues that Darwinian evolution was the only way God could create such goodness. "A universe with the sort of beauty, diversity, sentience, and sophistication of creatures that the biosphere now contains" could only come about by the natural processes of evolution. According to Russell and Southgate, the goodness of creation is intrinsically linked to the evolutionary processes by which such goodness is achieved, and these processes, in turn, inevitably come with pain and suffering as intrinsic to them. In this scenario, natural evils are an inevitable consequence of developing life.

In his evolutionary theodicy, Richard Kropf supposes that "what we take for evil in the natural course of events, exists primarily because creation as an evolutionary process necessarily begins with forms of existence that are totally unlike God." Bethany Sollereder acknowledges that violence and suffering are inherent in the evolutionary process, yet asserts this is given context and redemption in light of the "creative suffering of God."

==== Non-identity theodicy ====
Built on the work of philosophers like Derek Parfit and Robert Merrihew Adams, the non-identity theodicy has been defended by both Scott Hill and Vince Vitale. The idea behind it is that individual persons can only come into existence if God has a policy of evil allowance. On Vitale's version, God offers all people who come into existence a great overall life, and he does not wrong anyone by bringing them into existence.

== Hinduism ==
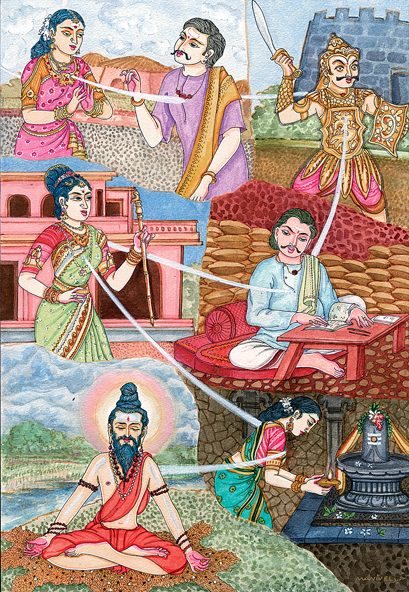
Illustration of reincarnation in Hindu art

Hinduism is a multifaceted religion with many different currents and religious beliefs. Its non-theist traditions, such as Samkhya, early Nyaya, Mimamsa, and many within Vedanta, do not posit the existence of an almighty, omnipotent, omniscient, and omnibenevolent God, so the classical formulations of the problem of evil and theodicy do not apply to them. Evil as well as good, along with suffering, is considered real and caused by human free will. Its source and consequences are explained through the reincarnation doctrine of Hinduism.

A version of the problem of evil appears in the ancient Brahma Sutras, probably composed between 200 BCE and 200 CE, a foundational text of the Vedanta tradition of Hinduism. Its verses 2.1.34 through 2.1.36 aphoristically mention a version of the problem of suffering and evil in the context of the abstract metaphysical Hindu concept of Brahman. Verse 2.1.34 of Brahma Sutras asserts that inequality and cruelty in the world cannot be attributed to the concept of Brahman, and this is in the Vedas and the Upanishads. In his interpretation and commentary on the Brahma Sutras, the 8th-century scholar Adi Shankara states that because some people are happier than others and because there is so much malice, cruelty, and pain in the world, Brahman cannot be the cause of the world.

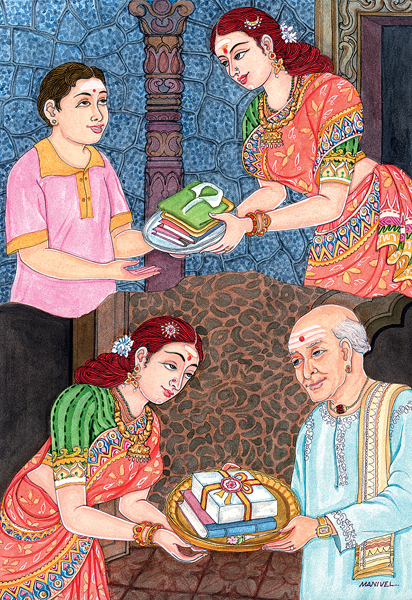
Karma as action and reaction: if we show goodness, we will reap goodness

Shankara attributes evil and cruelty in the world to the karma of oneself, of others, and to ignorance, delusion, and wrong knowledge, but not to the abstract Brahman. Brahman itself is beyond good and evil. Those who struggle with this explanation, states Shankara, do so because of presumed duality between Brahman and Jiva or because of a linear view of existence, when in reality, "samsara and karma are anadi" (existence is cyclic, rebirth and deeds are eternal with no beginning). According to Swami Gambhirananda of Ramakrishna Mission, Shankara's commentary explains that God cannot be charged with partiality or cruelty (i.e., injustice) on account of his taking the factors of virtuous and vicious actions performed by an individual in previous lives. If an individual experiences pleasure or pain in this life, it is due to a virtuous or vicious action done by that individual in a past life (karma).

The theory of karma refers to the spiritual principle of cause and effect, where the intent and actions of an individual influence the future of that individual. The problem of evil, in the context of karma, has been long discussed in Indian religions including Buddhism, Hinduism and Jainism, both in its theistic and nontheistic schools; for example, in Uttara Mīmāṃsā Sutras Book 2 Chapter 1; the 8th-century arguments by Adi Sankara in Brahmasutrabhasya where he posits that God cannot reasonably be the cause of the world because there exists moral evil, inequality, cruelty and suffering in the world; and the 11th-century theodicy discussion by Ramanuja in Sribhasya.

Dualistic Dvaita tradition, founded by Madhvacharya in the 13th century posits a concept of God so similar to Christianity that Christian missionaries in colonial India suggested that Madhvacharya was likely influenced by early Christians who migrated to India, a theory that has been discredited by scholars. Madhvacharya was challenged by Hindu scholars on the problem of evil, given his dualistic Tattvavada theory that proposed God and living beings along with the universe as separate realities. In response, Madhvacharya asserted that "one has the right to choose between right and wrong, a choice each individual makes out of his own responsibility and his own risk."

According to Sharma, "Madhva's tripartite classification of souls makes it unnecessary to answer the problem of evil." However, David Buchta disagrees, saying that this does not address the problem of evil because the omnipotent God "could change the system, but chooses not to" and thus sustains the evil in the world.

== Islam ==
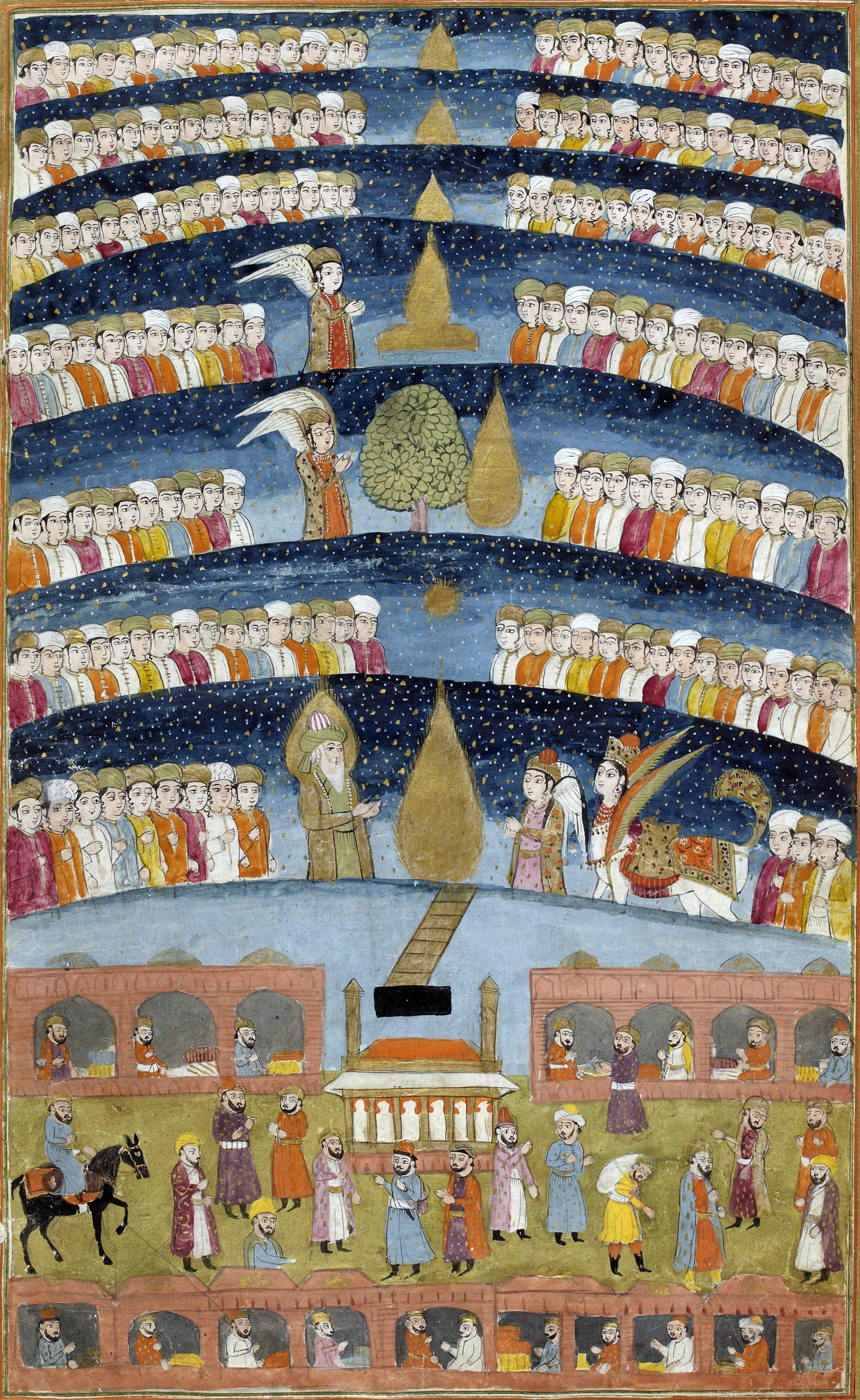
An 1808 Islamic miniature depicting Jannah

In the book "Tawhid Al-Mofazzal" which is written in the 8th century AD and attributed to Imam Jaafar Al-Sadiq, the sixth Imam of Shia Muslims, it is argued that essentially there is no such thing as "evil" in Creation. There is wisdom behind all the painful and unpleasant events that occur in this world and all of them, without an exception, lead to beneficial consequences in the long run, considering both this world and afterlife together. In addition, not only these seemingly "evil" events benefit righteous and good people, by making them more steadfast and righteous and cleansing them from minor sins they have done in the past, but they are beneficial even to the wrongdoers, by healing their moral and spiritual diseases or at least preventing them from committing more sins and inflicting more hurts to themselves and others. In short, if an event is, or seems, painful and unpleasant it does not necessarily follow that it is "evil" and not good. As an example of the arguments presented in this book, in the fourth chapter, there is a passage that reads like this:

"And the group that dislikes these harmful things in the world are like children who detest bitter and unpleasant medicines, and become angry when they are forbidden from delicious foods that harm them, and they hate acquiring manners, knowledge, and crafts, and they love to spend their time constantly in amusement and idleness, and to eat whatever food and drink they want. And they do not understand what harm growing up in idleness causes to their religion and world, and what pains delicious and harmful foods and drinks cause in their bodies, and they do not understand that in acquiring good manners there are blessed consequences, and in drinking bitter medicines there is healing, and that there are many pains that are followed by comforts, and many bitternesses that are followed by sweetness."

Islamic scholars in the medieval and modern eras have tried to reconcile the problem of evil with the afterlife theodicy. According to Nursi, the temporal world has many evils, such as the destruction of the Ottoman Empire and its substitution with secularism, and such evils are impossible to understand unless there is an afterlife. The omnipotent, omniscient, omnibenevolent God in Islamic thought creates everything, including human suffering and its causes (evil). On this view, evil is neither bad nor does it need moral justification from God. The faithful suffered in this short life so as to be judged by God and enjoy Jannah in the never-ending afterlife.

Meanwhile, the Islamic rationalist school, Mu'tazilite, tried to resolve theological questions in dealing with disaster and cruelty in the world. This dialectical effort led to the formation of Mu'tazilah theodicy, which states that because God is all-just and wise, it is impossible for God to do or carry out things that are contrary to reason. Proponents of the theodicy claim that God cannot possibly act without considering the welfare of his creatures. For that reason, according to Mu'tazilah theodicy, all crimes, cruelties, disasters, and misery that exist and occur in the world must be considered as something that occurs solely because of human free will or due to natural phenomena. For the Mu'tazilites, humans will undergo ḥisāb (the process of calculating their deeds in the afterlife) based on their actions and behavior in the world. Proponents of the theodicy claim that humans consciously shape their actions and behavior through free will.

Alternate theodicies in Islamic thought include the 11th-century Ibn Sina's denial of evil in a form similar to the "privation theory" theodicy. However, this theodicy attempt by Ibn Sina is considered by Shams C. Inati to be unsuccessful because it implicitly denies the omnipotence of God.

== Judaism ==
=== Hebrew Bible ===
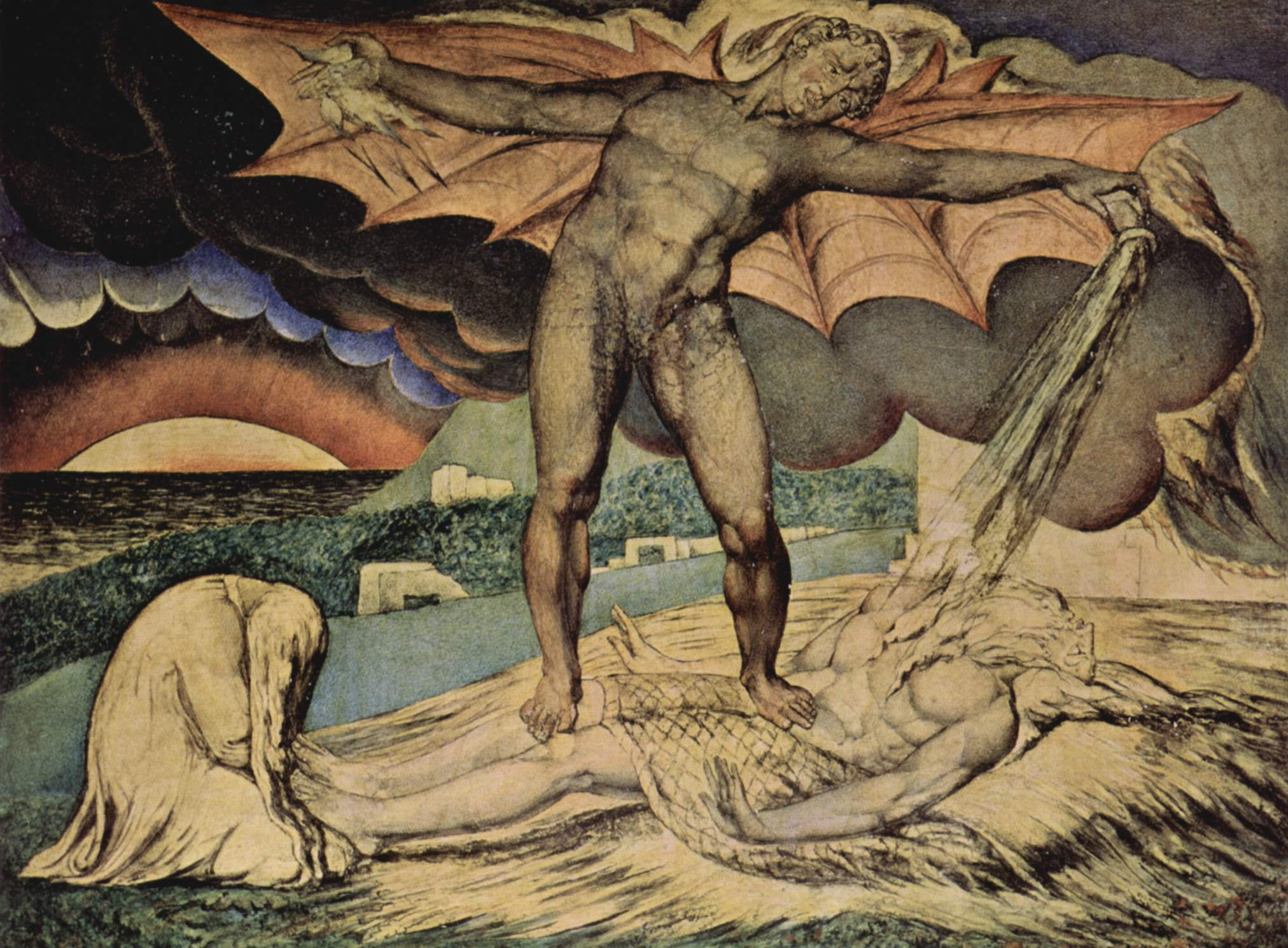
Satan smiting Job with sore boils

In the Hebrew Bible, all characterizations of evil and suffering assert the view of "a God who is greater than suffering [who] is powerful, creative and committed to His creation [who] always has the last word"; God's commitment to the greater good is assumed in all cases. In the Hebrew Bible, Genesis says God's creation is "good," with evil depicted as entering creation as a result of human choice. The Book of Job "seeks to expand the understanding of divine justice ...beyond mere retribution, to include a system of divine sovereignty [showing] the King has the right to test His subject's loyalty... [Job] corrects the rigid and overly simplistic doctrine of retribution in attributing suffering to sin and punishment."

Hebrew Bible scholar Marvin A. Sweeney says, "...a unified reading of [Isaiah] places the question of theodicy at the forefront... [with] three major dimensions of the question: Yahweh's identification with the conqueror, Yahweh's decree of judgment against Israel without possibility of repentance, and the failure of Yahweh's program to be realized by the end of the book." Ezekiel and Jeremiah confront the concept of personal moral responsibility and understanding divine justice in a world under divine governance. "Theodicy in the Minor Prophets differs little from that in Isaiah, Jeremiah, and Ezekiel." In the Psalms, more personal aspects of theodicy are discussed, such as Psalm 73, which confronts the internal struggle created by suffering. Theodicy in the Hebrew Bible almost universally looks "beyond the concerns of the historical present to posit an eschatological salvation" at that future time when God restores all things.

=== Tradition and philosophy ===
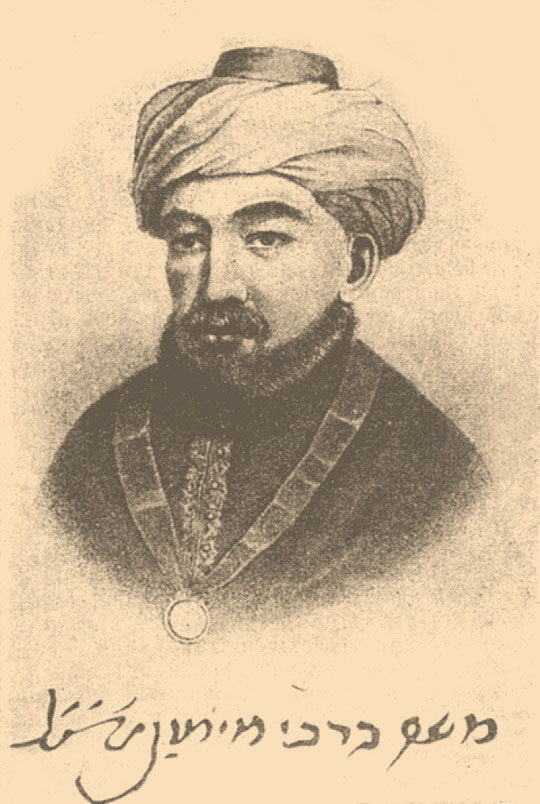
Moses Maimonides

10th-century Rabbi Saadia Gaon presented a theodicy along the lines of "soul-making, greater good and afterlife." Saadia suggested that suffering, in a manner similar to Babylonian Talmud Berakhot 5, should be considered as a gift from God because it leads to an eternity of heaven in the afterlife. In contrast, the 12th-century Moses Maimonides offered a different theodicy, asserting that the all-loving God neither produces evil nor gifts suffering because everything God does is absolutely good, then presenting the "privation theory" explanation. Both these answers, states Daniel Rynhold, merely rationalize and suppress the problem of evil rather than solve it. Attempts by theologians to reconcile the problem of evil, with claims that the Holocaust evil was a necessary, intentional, and purposeful act of God, have been declared obscene by Jewish thinkers such as Richard Rubenstein.

The problem of evil gained renewed interest after the Holocaust; according to beliefs of the Jews, the all-powerful, all-compassionate, all-knowing monotheistic God presumably had the power to prevent the Holocaust, but he did not. The persecution of Jewish people was not a new phenomenon, and medieval Jewish thinkers such as Judah Halevi and Saadia Gaon had, in abstract, attempted to resolve the problem of evil. The Holocaust experience and other episodes of mass extermination, such as the Gulag and the Killing Fields, where millions of people experienced torture and died, however, brought into focus the visceral nature of the problem.
