= Shams C. Inati =

Shams C. Inati is a professor in the Department of Theology and Religious Studies, the Center for Arab and Islamic Studies, and the Department of Philosophy at Villanova University. She has authored many works and has translated numerous Arabic philosophical texts, with an emphasis on Ibn Sina and other medieval Islamic thinkers. Much of her work focuses on the problem of evil, metaphysics, and historical dilemmas in the Middle East. The Bulletin of the School of Oriental and African Studies praised her "scholarly, well researched and well analysed commentary" on Ibn Sina. Her work has also been cited or reviewed in the Middle East Journal, The Journal of Religion, the American Catholic Philosophical Quarterly, and the Journal of Semitic Studies.

== Selected works ==
- Ibn Sina’s Remarks and Admonitions: Physics and Metaphysics: An Analysis and Annotated Translation. Translated by Inati, Shams. Columbia University Press. 2014. ISBN 978-0-231-53742-1.
- Inati, Shams Constantine (2003). Iraq: Its History, People, and Politics. Humanity Books. ISBN 978-1-59102-096-7.
- Inati, Shams Constantine (2000). The Problem of Evil: Ibn Sînâ's Theodicy. Global Academic Publishing. ISBN 978-1-58684-006-8.
- Inati, Shams Constantine (1996). Ibn Sīnā and Mysticism: Remarks and Admonitions, Part Four. Kegan Paul International. ISBN 978-0-7103-0482-7.
- Inati, Shams Constantine; Ṣadr, Muḥammad Bāqir (1987). Our Philosophy. Muhammadi Trust. ISBN 978-0-7103-0179-6.
- Inati, Shams Constantine (1984). Remarks and Admonitions: Logic. Pontifical Institute of Mediaeval Studies. ISBN 978-0-88844-277-2.
