= Paul Draper (philosopher) =

American philosopher (born 1957)

- Born: Paul Robert Draper; 1957 (age 68–69)

Academic background
- Education: University of California, Irvine
- Thesis: The Evidential Problem of Evil (1985)
- Influences: William L. Rowe, Rudolph Otto, Richard Swinburne

Academic work
- Discipline: Philosophy
- Sub-discipline: Philosophy of religion; philosophy of science
- School or tradition: Analytic philosophy
- Institutions: Florida International University; Purdue University
- Notable ideas: Skeptical theism, Humean Argument from Evil, Panpsychotheism, Ietsism

Paul Robert Draper (born 1957) is an American philosopher, most known for his work in the philosophy of religion. His work on the evidential argument from evil for atheism has been widely influential. He is currently a professor at Purdue University. He is co-editor of topics in the philosophy of religion for the Stanford Encyclopedia of Philosophy.

== Career ==
Draper studied philosophy at the University of California, Irvine, receiving his Bachelor of Arts degree in 1979, his Master of Arts degree in 1982, and his Doctor of Philosophy degree in 1985. He taught philosophy at Florida International University from 1987 to 2006, after which he moved to Purdue University.

Draper was editor of the academic journal Philo from 2007 to 2012. His philosophical inquiry is focused on issues in the philosophy of religion; he has written extensively on the problem of evil, including the argument that the process of natural selection is sufficiently brutal so as to pose a problem for those who believe in an omnipotent and morally good creator. In 1997, he debated the Christian apologist William Lane Craig over the existence of God. He has edited a debate collection called God or Blind Nature? Philosophers Debate the Evidence, released as an e-book in 2007.

One of Draper's influential and widely reprinted papers is "Pain and Pleasure: An Evidential Problem for Theists", published in the journal Noûs in 1989. In it, Draper proposes a modification and extension of the "problem of evil" argument. Instead of claiming that the existence of evil logically contradicts theism, he argues that the "hypothesis of indifference", which holds that should supernatural beings exist, they are indifferent to our suffering, better explains the existence of suffering. Since the hypothesis of indifference is logically incompatible with theism, he considers this an evidentiary problem for theism. The paper relies significantly on the use of epistemic probabilities, equivalent to those used in Bayesian reasoning. He is also responsible for first coining the term skeptical theism.
