= Trent Dougherty =

American analytical philosopher

- Occupation: Philosopher

Trent Dougherty is an American analytical philosopher who has specialized on the problem of evil.

== Career ==
Dougherty obtained a MA in philosophy from the University of Missouri-Columbia and a PhD from the University of Rochester in 2009. He was a philosophy professor at Baylor University from 2009 to 2018. He resigned in 2018 after an investigation at Baylor University determined he had violated the Sexual and Gender-Based Harassment and Interpersonal Violence Policy. He was found "responsible" on some allegations and "not responsible" on others. Dougherty has stated that none of the allegations against him were of "sexual assault or sexual activity". He was a former Executive Editor of the Journal of Analytic Theology.

Dougherty authored The Problem of Animal Pain in 2014 which addresses the issue of animal suffering from a Christian perspective. The book argues that the only possible way that animal suffering could be justified is that if the animals are resurrected after death and become full-fledged persons. He was influenced by Irenaeus' "soul-making" theodicy popularized by philosopher John Hick. Dougherty argues that God's ultimate purpose for all his creatures is sainthood and that the world is finely tuned for the right amount of suffering to produce saintly creatures. A review of the book noted that Dougherty "employs a version of John Hick's theodicy of soul-making as a God-justifying account of suffering by animals". Critics have stated that Dougherty's soul-making theodicy combined with an animal afterlife keeps the reason for suffering obscure.

== Selected publications ==
- Evidentialism and Its Discontents. Oxford University Press. 2011.
- Justin McBrayer and Trent Dougherty, ed. (2014). Skeptical Theism: New Essays. Oxford University Press.
- The Problem of Animal Pain: A Theodicy for All Creatures Great and Small. Palgrave Macmillan. 2014.

== Quotes ==
A class of animals … will not only be resurrected at the eschaton, but will be deified in much the same way that humans will be. That they will become, in the language of Narnia, “talking animals.” Language is the characteristic mark of high intelligence. So I am suggesting that they will become full-fledged persons (rational substances) who can look back on their lives—both pre- and post-personal—and form attitudes about what has happened to them and how they fit into God’s plan.

— Trent Dougherty, The Problem of Animal Pain, 2014
