= William L. Rowe =

American philosopher of religion (1931–2015)

William Rowe
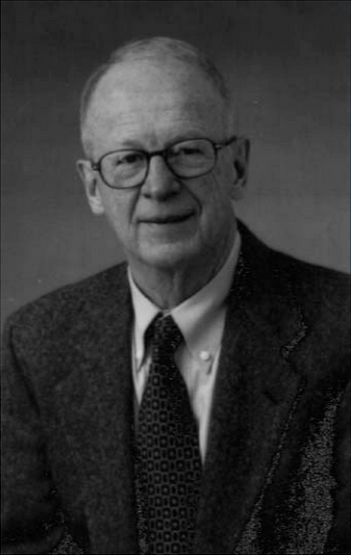
- Born: July 26, 1931; Detroit, Michigan, U.S.
- Died: August 22, 2015 (aged 84); Lafayette, Indiana, U.S.

Education
- Education: Wayne State University; Chicago Theological Seminary (MDiv); University of Michigan (Ph.D)

Philosophical work
- Era: Contemporary philosophy
- Region: Western philosophy
- School: Analytic philosophy
- Main interests: Philosophy of religion
- Notable ideas: Evidential problem of evil

William Leonard Rowe (/roʊ/; July 26, 1931 – August 22, 2015) was a professor of philosophy at Purdue University who specialized in the philosophy of religion. His work played a leading role in the "remarkable revival of analytic philosophy of religion since the 1970s". He was noted for his formulation of the evidential argument from evil.

== Biography ==
William Leonard Rowe was born on July 26, 1931. According to Rowe, he became an evangelical Christian during his teenage years and planned to become a minister, eventually enrolling at the Detroit Bible Institute for his collegiate education. He reported in personal conversation that he became disgruntled there over the firing of one professor for theological views not held by the administration. Thinking it too political for him, he decided to change course and find a close major to theology, namely, philosophy. He then transferred to Wayne State University. From there his plan was to go to Fuller Theological Seminary as a springboard to entering ministry, possibly teaching ministry. He never made it to Fuller. While at Wayne State he reported that one particular professor, whose father was a minister but himself an atheist, had remarkable influence on Rowe.

After his graduation from Wayne State, Rowe began his post-graduate education at the Chicago Theological Seminary (CTS). He reported that it was at this time he began to take a more critical look at the Bible, learn about its origins and meet theologians who, unlike himself, did not have a fundamentalist perspective. The result was that his own fundamentalism began to wane.

He received a Master of Divinity degree from CTS, and then went on to pursue a Ph.D. in philosophy from the University of Michigan. He completed his doctorate in 1962, taught briefly at the University of Illinois and later that year, joined the faculty of Purdue University.

Rowe described his conversion from Christian fundamentalist to, ultimately, an atheist as a gradual process, resulting from "the lack of experiences and evidence sufficient to sustain my religious life and my religious convictions." He said that his examination of the origins of the Bible caused him to doubt its being divine in nature, and that he then began to look and pray for signs of the existence of God. "But in the end, I had no more sense of the presence of God than I had before my [evangelical] conversion experience. So, it was the absence of religious experiences of the appropriate kind that . . . left me free to seriously explore the grounds for disbelief," Rowe said.

On August 22, 2015, Rowe died at the age of 84.

=== Friendly atheism ===
Rowe introduced the concept of a "friendly atheist" in his classic paper on the argument from evil. A friendly atheist is a person who accepts that some theists have rationales for their belief in God, even if it is the case that God doesn't exist. One consequence of Rowe's philosophical friendliness was his adherence to the principle of charity. He published in defense of theistic arguments, and was even considered a supporter of the cosmological argument.

== Works ==
=== Influential papers ===
- Rowe, William L. (1979). "The Problem of Evil and Some Varieties of Atheism". American Philosophical Quarterly. 16: 335–41. Reprinted in Howard-Snyder, Daniel, ed. (1996). The Evidential Argument from Evil. Bloomington, IN: Indiana University Press.
- ——— (1996). "The Evidential Argument from Evil: A Second Look.". In Howard-Snyder, Daniel (ed.). The Evidential Argument from Evil. Bloomington, IN: Indiana University Press.

=== Books ===
- ——— (1968). Religious Symbols and God. Chicago: University of Chicago Press. ISBN 1-121-93077-8.
- ——— (1975). The Cosmological Argument. B: Princeton University Press. ISBN 0-8232-1885-6.
- ——— (1978). Philosophy of Religion: An Introduction. Wadsworth Publishing. ISBN 0-495-00725-0.
- ——— (1991). Thomas Reid on Freedom and Morality. Cornell University Press. ISBN 0-8014-2557-3.
- ——— (2004). Can God Be Free?. Oxford, England: Oxford University Press. ISBN 0-19-920412-8.

=== About his work ===
- Trakakis, Nick (2007). The God Beyond Belief: In Defence of William Rowe's Evidential Argument from Evil. Springer. ISBN 978-1-4020-5144-9.

== See also ==
- American philosophy
- List of American philosophers
