= Augustinian theodicy =

Christian theodicy of Augustine of Hippo

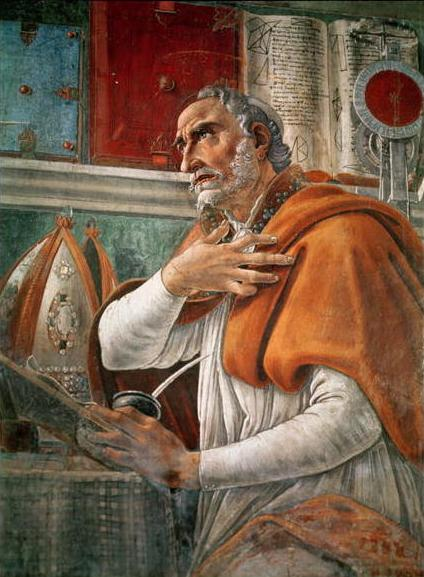
Augustine of Hippo (AD 354–430) as painted by Sandro Botticelli (c. 1445–1510). Augustine is credited with developing the first form of the theodicy now named for him.

The Augustinian theodicy, named for the 4th- and 5th-century theologian and philosopher Augustine of Hippo, is a type of Christian theodicy that developed in response to the evidential problem of evil. As such, it attempts to explain the probability of an omnipotent (all-powerful) and omnibenevolent (all-loving) God amid evidence of evil in the world. A number of variations of this kind of theodicy have been proposed throughout history; their similarities were first described by the 20th-century philosopher John Hick, who classified them as "Augustinian". They typically assert that God is perfectly (ideally) good, that he created the world out of nothing, and that evil is the result of humanity's original sin. The entry of evil into the world is generally explained as consequence of original sin and its continued presence due to humans' misuse of free will and concupiscence. God's goodness and benevolence, according to the Augustinian theodicy, remain perfect and without responsibility for evil or suffering.

Augustine of Hippo was the first to develop the theodicy. He rejected the idea that evil exists in itself, instead regarding it as a corruption of goodness, caused by humanity's abuse of free will. Augustine believed in the existence of a physical Hell as a punishment for sin, but argued that those who choose to accept the salvation of Jesus Christ will go to Heaven. In the 13th century, Thomas Aquinas – influenced by Augustine – proposed a similar theodicy based on the view that God is goodness and that there can be no evil in him. He believed that the existence of goodness allows evil to exist, through the fault of humans. Augustine also influenced John Calvin, who supported Augustine's view that evil is the result of free will and argued that sin corrupts humans, requiring God's grace to give moral guidance.

The theodicy was criticised by Augustine's contemporary Fortunatus, a Manichaean who contended that God must still be somehow implicated in evil, and 18th-century theologian Francesco Antonio Zaccaria criticised Augustine's concept of evil for not dealing with individual human suffering. Hick regards evil as necessary for the moral and spiritual development of humans, and process theologians have argued that God is not omnipotent and so cannot be responsible for any evil. The logic of Augustine's approach has been adapted by Alvin Plantinga, among others. Plantinga's adapted Augustinian theodicy, the free will defence – which he proposed in the 1980s – attempts to answer only the logical problem of evil. Such a defence (not a "theodicy" proper) does not demonstrate the existence of God, or the probable existence of God, but attempts to prove that the existence of God and the presence of evil (or privatio boni) in the world are not logically contradictory.

== General forms ==
The Augustinian theodicy was first distinguished as a form of theodicy by John Hick in Evil and the God of Love, written in 1966, in which he classified Augustine's theodicy and its subsequent developments as "Augustinian". Hick distinguished between the Augustinian theodicy, which attempts to clear God of all responsibility for evil, based on human free will, and the Irenaean theodicy, which casts God as responsible for evil but justified because of its benefits for human development.

The Augustinian theodicy is a response to the evidential problem of evil, which raises the concern that if God is omnipotent and omnibenevolent, there should be no evil in the world. Evidence of evil can call into question God's nature or his existence – he is either not omnipotent, not benevolent, or does not exist. Theodicy is an attempt to reconcile the existence and nature of God with evidence of evil in the world by providing valid explanations for its occurrence. The Augustinian theodicy asserts that God created the world ex nihilo (out of nothing), but maintains that God did not create evil and is not responsible for its occurrence. Evil is not attributed existence in its own right, but is described as the privation of good – the corruption of God's good creation.

The Augustinian theodicy supports the notion of original sin. All versions of this theodicy accept the theological implications of the Genesis creation narrative, including the belief that God created human beings without sin or suffering. Evil is believed to be a just punishment for the fall of man: when Adam and Eve first disobeyed God and were exiled from the Garden of Eden. The free will of humans is offered by the Augustinian theodicy as the continued reason for moral evil: people commit immoral acts when their will is evil. The evil nature of human will is attributed to original sin; Augustinian theologians argue that the sin of Adam and Eve corrupted the will of human beings, maintaining that God is blameless and good, and not himself responsible for evil.

== Development ==
=== Augustine ===
Augustine of Hippo (AD 354–430) was a philosopher and theologian born in Roman Africa (present-day Algeria). He followed the Manichaean religion during his early life, but converted to Christianity in 386. His two major works, Confessions and City of God, develop key ideas regarding his response to suffering. In Confessions, Augustine wrote that his previous work was dominated by materialism and that reading Plato's works enabled him to consider the existence of a non-physical substance. This helped him develop a response to the problem of evil from a theological (and non-Manichean) perspective, based on his interpretation of the first few chapters of Genesis and the writings of Paul the Apostle. In City of God, Augustine developed his theodicy as part of his attempt to trace human history and describe its conclusion.

Augustine proposed that evil could not exist within God, nor be created by God, and is instead a by-product of God's creativity. He rejected the notion that evil exists in itself, proposing instead that it is a privation of (or falling away from) good, and a corruption of nature. He wrote that "evil has no positive nature; but the loss of good has received the name 'evil.'" Both moral and natural evil occurs, Augustine argued, owing to an evil use of free will, which could be traced back to Adam and Eve's original sin, which to him was inexplicable given the understanding that Adam and Eve were "created with perfect natures". He believed that this evil will, present in the human soul, was a corruption of the will given to humans by God, making suffering a just punishment for the sin of humans. Because Augustine believed that all of humanity was "seminally present in the loins of Adam", he argued that all of humanity inherited Adam's sin and his just punishment. However, in spite of his belief that free will can be turned to evil, Augustine maintained that it is vital for humans to have free will, because they could not live well without it. He argued that evil could come from humans because, although humans contained no evil, they were also not perfectly good and hence could be corrupted.

Augustine believed that a physical Hell exists, but that physical punishment is secondary to the punishment of being separated from God. He proposed two reasons for this: Firstly, humans have free will, and only those who choose to follow God will be forgiven and able to avoid Hell. Secondly, he believed that Adam and Eve's choice to sin affected our free choice, and that humans are left unable to resist sin. Augustine proposed that the grace of Jesus Christ freed humans from original sin, but he maintained that humans can only be saved if they choose to receive grace, and that this choice is formed by the character of individual humans. Accepting that even those who will be saved continue to sin, Augustine proposed that those who choose God's grace will still go to Hell for a time to purge them of their sin, before going to Heaven.

=== Thomas Aquinas ===
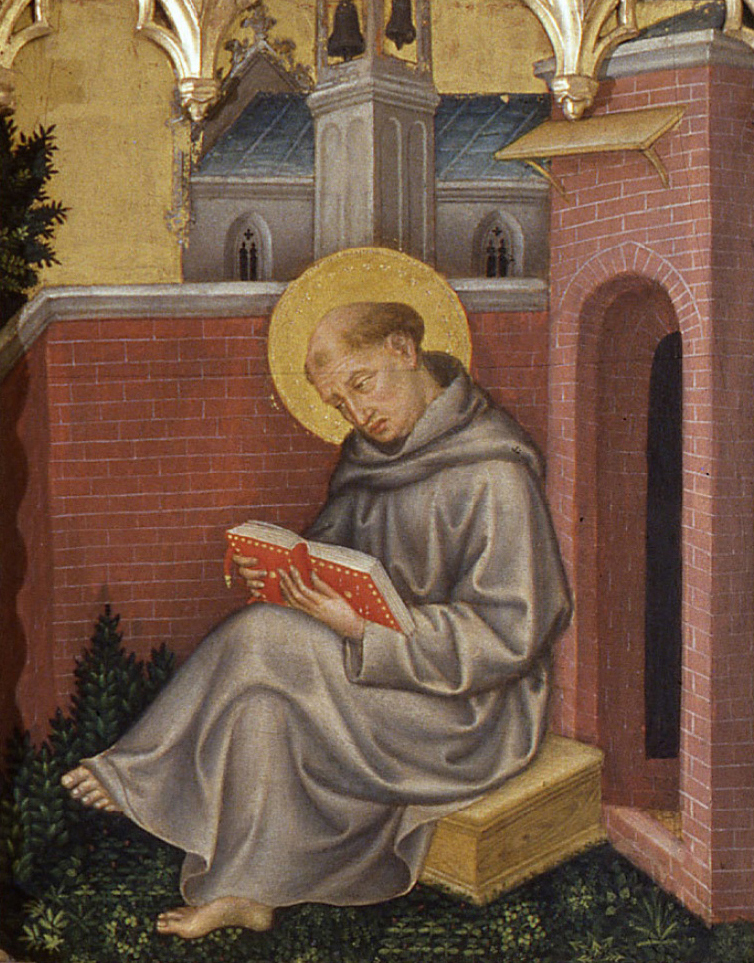
Gentile da Fabriano's portrait of Thomas Aquinas, who developed a theodicy heavily influenced by Augustine

Thomas Aquinas, a thirteenth-century scholastic philosopher and theologian heavily influenced by Augustine, proposed a form of the Augustinian theodicy in his Summa Theologica. Aquinas began by attempting to establish the existence of God, through his Five Ways, and then attested that God is good and must have a morally sufficient reason for allowing evil to exist. Aquinas proposed that all goodness in the world must exist perfectly in God, and that, existing perfectly, God must be perfectly good. He concluded that God is goodness, and that there is no evil in God.

Aquinas supported Augustine's view that evil is a privation of goodness, maintaining that evil has existence as a privation intrinsically found in good. The existence of this evil, Aquinas believed, can be completely explained by free will. Faced with the assertion that humans would have been better off without free will, he argued that the possibility of sin is necessary for a perfect world, and so individuals are responsible for their sin. Good is the cause of evil, but only owing to fault on the part of the agent. In his theodicy, to say something is evil is to say that it lacks goodness which means that it could not be part of God's creation, because God's creation lacked nothing. Aquinas noted that, although goodness makes evil possible, it does not necessitate evil. This means that God (who is good) is not cast as the cause of evil, because evil arises out of a defect in an agent, and God is seen to be without defect. The philosopher Eleonore Stump, considering Aquinas' commentary on the Book of Job, argues that Aquinas has a positive view of suffering: it is necessary to contrast Earth with heaven and remind humans that they still have the propensity to commit evil. Aquinas believed that evil is acceptable because of the good that comes from it, and that evil can only be justified when it is required in order for good to occur. Attempting to relieve God of responsibility for the occurrence of evil, Aquinas insisted that God merely permits evil to happen, rather than willing it. He recognised the occurrence of what seems to be evil, but did not attribute to it the same level of existence that he attributed to spirituality. Like Augustine, Aquinas asserted that humans bear responsibility for evil owing to their abuse of freedom of the will.

=== John Calvin ===
John Calvin, a sixteenth-century French theologian and principal figure in the development of Calvinism, was influenced by Augustine's works. Unlike Augustine, Calvin was willing to accept that God is responsible for evil and suffering; however, he maintained that God cannot be indicted for it. Calvin continued the Augustinian approach that sin is the result of the fall of man, and argued that the human mind, will, and affections are corrupted by sin. He believed that only the grace of God is sufficient to provide humans with ongoing ethical guidance, arguing that reason is blinded by humans' sinful nature. Calvin proposed that humanity is predestined, divided into the elect and the reprobate: the elect are those who God has chosen to save and are the only ones who will be saved.

== Criticism ==
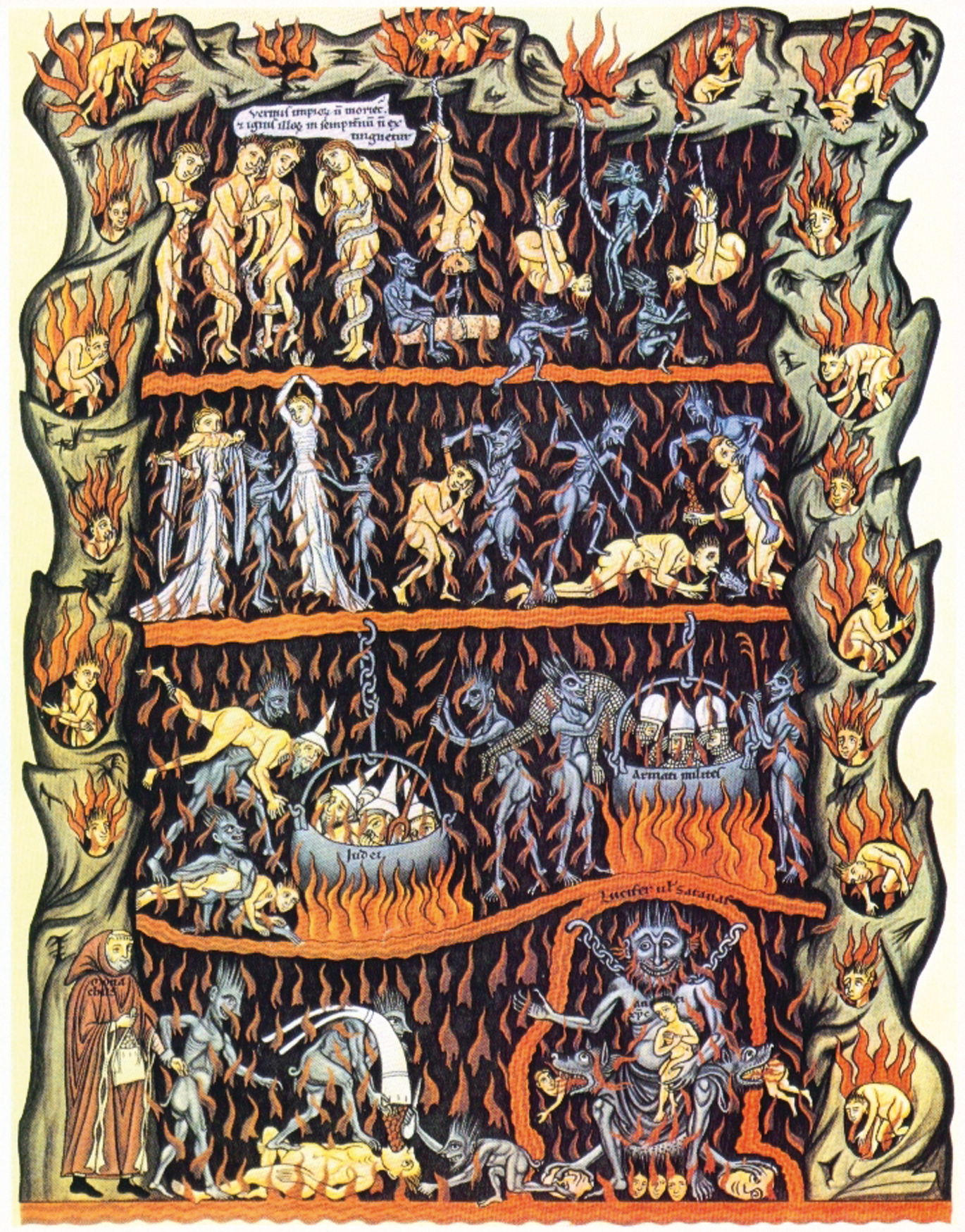
John Hick criticised the Augustinian concept of Hell, vividly depicted in this twelfth-century painting from the Hortus deliciarum by Herrad of Landsberg.

=== Fortunatus ===
Augustine's Acts or Disputation Against Fortunatus the Manichaean, which partly touches on the problem of evil, records a public debate between Augustine and the Manichaean teacher Fortunatus. Fortunatus criticised Augustine's theodicy by proposing that if God gave free will to the human soul, then he must be implicated in human sin (a problem that Augustine had himself considered four years earlier, in Free Will). Quoting the New Testament, Fortunatus proposed that evil exists beyond the evil acts people commit, and that people commit such acts because of their own flawed nature. Augustine replied by arguing that the sin of Adam constrained human freedom, in a way similar to the formation of habits. This was not a teaching on original sin (a view that Augustine was yet to formulate), but on the limitations of human freedom caused by sin. Fortunatus proposed that Augustine was reducing the scope of evil only to what is committed by humans, though Augustine writes that Fortunatus finally conceded the debate when he admitted that he could not defend his views on the origin of evil.

=== Buddhism ===
The scholars of religion Paul Ingram and Frederick Streng argued that the teachings of Buddhism challenge Augustine's view of good and evil, proposing a dualism in which good and evil have equal value instead of casting good over evil, as Augustine did. This is similar to the Manichean account of good and evil – that the two are equal and in conflict – though Buddhism teaches that the two will come to a final conclusion and transcend the conflict. Ingram and Streng argued that the Augustinian theodicy fails to account for the existence of evil before Adam's sin, which Genesis presents in the form of the serpent's temptation.

=== Francesco Antonio Zaccaria ===
The Italian theologian Francesco Antonio Zaccaria criticised Augustine's concept of evil in the eighteenth century. He noted a distinction between using the term evil to imply blame (sin) and to imply lament (suffering) and argued that Augustine posited sin to have occurred before suffering. This was problematic for Zaccaria, who believed that it made Augustine seem offhand and uninterested in human suffering. For Zaccaria, Augustine's perception of evil as a privation did not satisfactorily answer the questions of modern society as to why suffering exists.

=== John Hick ===
John Hick criticised the Augustinian theodicy when he developed his own theodicy in 1966. Hick supported the views of the German theologian Friedrich Schleiermacher, which he classified as Irenaean, who argued that the world is perfectly suited for the moral development of humans and that this justifies the existence of evil. He insisted that, while the Augustinian theodicy attempted to justify historical occurrences of evil, the Irenaean theodicy seeks to justify God eternally. Hick saw Augustine's view that a perfect world went wrong as incoherent and contradictory, and argued that, if humans were made perfectly good, then it should have been impossible for them to have made an immoral choice. He questioned the success of the theodicy with the charge that it does not remove the blame for evil from God: Augustine presented a theology of predestination; Hick argued that, if God knew the choices that his creation would make, he must be responsible for them. Hick's theodicy rejected the idea of the inheritance of sinfulness, and he believed that an eternal hell would render "a Christian theodicy impossible". The Irenaean theodicy does not, as the Augustinian theodicy does, attempt to protect God from being responsible for evil; rather, it argues that God is responsible but justified for it because of the benefits it has for human development. Both theodicies stress the perfection of God's creation, but differ in why the world is seen as perfect. Augustine also believed, as Hick did, that bringing good out of evil is preferable to the evil not occurring in the first place.

=== Process theology ===
In God, Power and Evil: A Process Theodicy, published in 1976, David Ray Griffin criticised Augustine's reliance on free will and argued that it is incompatible with divine omniscience and omnipotence. Griffin argued in later works that humans cannot have free will if God is omniscient. He contended that, if God is truly omniscient, then he will know infallibly what people will do, meaning that they cannot be free. Griffin argued that the human will could not oppose God's will, if God is omnipotent. He proposed that original sin as Augustine conceived it must itself be caused by God, rendering any punishment he wills unjust.

Process theology argues that God is not omnipotent: rather than coercion, he has the power of divine persuasion, but he cannot force his will. Griffin, a prominent process theologian, argues that God feels the pain of the world (both physically and emotionally) and does everything within his power to achieve good, but he can neither force beings to be good nor prevent evil because he does not play a coercive role in the world. Process theology teaches that, rather than creating the world ex nihilo (as Augustine proposed), God created it out of a pre-existent chaos.

=== Alvin Plantinga ===
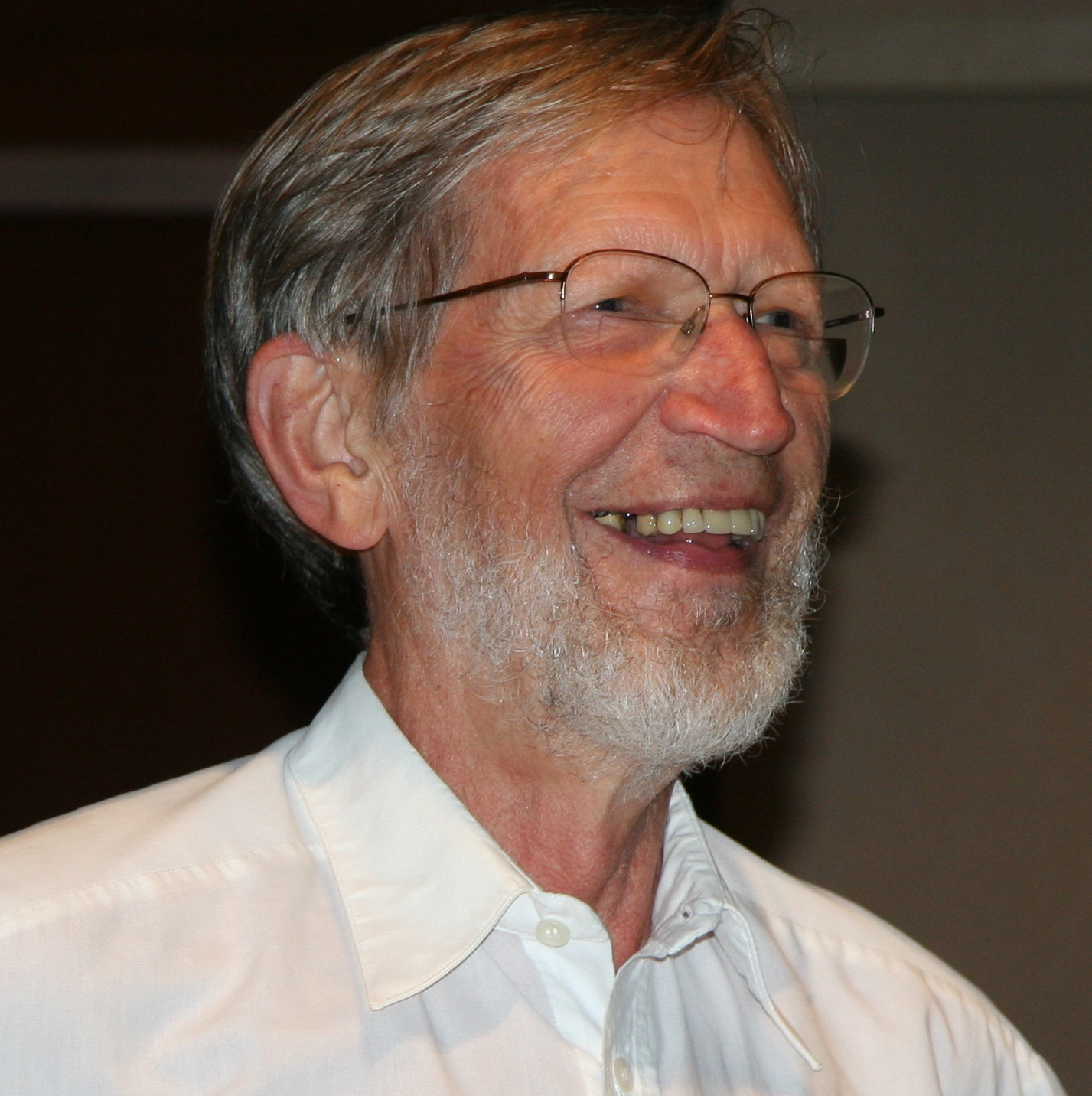
Alvin Plantinga, who presented a version of the free will defence as an alternative response to the problem of evil

In the 1970s, Alvin Plantinga presented a version of the free will defence which, he argued, demonstrated that the existence of an omnipotent benevolent God and of evil are not inconsistent. He believed that, unless it could be shown that the two are not inconsistent, they would be necessarily contradictory. To do this, Plantinga believed that a "possible state of affairs" must be proposed which, if actual, would make God's existence and the existence of evil consistent. He argued that a third proposition – that evil is the result of the actions of free, rational, fallible human beings – allows the existence of God and evil to be consistent. Plantinga supported this argument by claiming that there are some things that an omnipotent God could not do, yet remain omnipotent – for example, if an omnipotent God has necessary existence, he could not create a world in which he does not exist. For this reason, Plantinga argued that an omnipotent God could not create any universe that he chooses, as Leibniz had proposed. He suggested that, even in a world where humans have free will, their actions may be so predictable that God could not create a world where they would do something unpredictable. (Note: Steve Duncan used the example of a rational man who is offered five dollars for a Rembrandt. Assuming that he understands the meaning of the transaction and has no other reason to accept the offer, it can be predicted that he will reject the offer. Duncan holds that God could not create a world where the man freely accepts the offer (without changing the situation), illustrating Plantinga's point.) Finally, he argued that if every moral agent freely makes at least one bad moral decision in any possible universe, God cannot create a universe where there is human freedom and no evil. Plantinga maintained that the existence of an omnipotent, benevolent God and the existence of evil are not inconsistent.

Plantinga's version of the defence embraces Augustine's view of free will, but not his natural theology. Rather than attempt to show the existence of God as likely in the face of evil, as a theodicy does, Plantinga's free will defence attempts to show that belief in God is still logically possible, despite the existence of evil. The theologian Alister McGrath has noted that, because Plantinga only argued that the coexistence of God and evil are logically possible, he did not present a theodicy, but a defence. Plantinga did not attempt to demonstrate that his proposition is true or plausible, just that it is logically possible.

=== Compatibility with evolution ===
John Hick criticised Augustine's theory for being implausible in light of scientific insights on evolution, as it would make Augustine's idea of a fall from perfection inaccurate; this is reiterated by Nancey Murphy and George F. R. Ellis, who also contend that Augustine's idea of transmitting original sin from Adam to the rest of humanity requires biological explanation. The comparative religionist Arvind Sharma has argued that natural evil cannot be the result of moral evil in the way Augustine suggested: scientific consensus is that natural disasters and disease existed before humans and hence cannot be the result of human sin.

The twentieth-century philosopher Reinhold Niebuhr attempted to reinterpret the Augustinian theodicy in the light of evolutionary science by presenting its underlying argument without mythology. Niebuhr proposed that Augustine rejected the Manichean view that grants evil ontological existence and ties humans' sin to their created state. Augustine's argument continued, according to Niebuhr, by proposing that humans have a tendency to sin because of a biologically inherited nature and rejected the Pelagian view that human will could overcome sin on its own. Niebuhr believed Augustine's argument placed sin in the human will, which was corrupted by Adam's original sin. He argued that the logic behind Augustine's theodicy described sin as inevitable but unnecessary, which he believed captured the argument without relying on a literal interpretation of the fall, thus avoiding critique from scientific positions.

== See also ==
- Augustinian philosophers
- Augustinian soteriology
- Fall of man
- History of Christian theology
- Neoplatonism and Christianity
- Systematic theology
- Theodicy and the Bible
