= Theodicy and the Bible =

Relating theodicy and the Bible is crucial to understanding Abrahamic theodicy because the Bible "has been, both in theory and in fact, the dominant influence upon ideas about God and evil in the Western world". Theodicy, in its most common form, is the attempt to answer the question of why a good God permits the manifestation of evil. Theodicy attempts to resolve the evidential problem of evil by reconciling the traditional divine characteristics of omnibenevolence and omnipotence, in either their absolute or relative form, with the occurrence of evil or suffering in the world.

Theodicy is an "intensely urgent" and "constant concern" of "the entire Bible". The Bible raises the issue of theodicy by its portrayals of God as inflicting evil and by its accounts of people who question God's goodness by their angry indictments. However, the Bible "contains no comprehensive theodicy".

The most common theodicy is free will theodicy, which lays the blame for all moral evil and some natural evil on humanity's misuse of its free will.

== God and evil in the Bible ==
Barry Whitney gives the reason why a theodicy is important for those who believe in the biblical God when he observes that "it is the believer in God, more so than the skeptic, who is forced to come to terms with the problem of evil."

Biblical scholar Walter Brueggemann observes that "theodicy is a constant concern of the entire Bible" and he describes theodicy, from the biblical perspective, as a subject that "concerns the question of God's goodness and power in a world that is manifestly marked by disorder and evil." The Bible evokes a need for a theodicy by its indictments of God coupled with expressions of anger at God, both of which question God's righteousness.

The Bible contains numerous examples of God inflicting evil, both in the form of moral evil resulting from "man's sinful inclinations" and the physical evil of suffering. These two biblical uses of the word evil parallel the Oxford English Dictionary's definitions of the word as (a) "morally evil" and (b) "discomfort, pain, or trouble." The Bible sometimes portrays God as inflicting evil in the generic sense.

In other cases, the word evil refers to suffering. Suffering results from either (a) "'moral' evil, due to human volition" or (b) "'physical' evil, directly due to nature." The Bible portrays God as inflicting evil in both senses because its writers "regarded God as the ultimate Cause of evil." The Bible contains examples of suffering caused by nature that are attributed to God, as well as examples of suffering caused by humans that are attributed to God.

=== Biblical responses to evils ===
Tyron Inbody avers that "there is no biblical theodicy." However, Inbody observes that the Bible proffers "various solutions" to questions about God and the evil of human suffering. These "various solutions" to the why of suffering and other evils are delineated in the Bible's "responses" (James Crenshaw) or "approaches" (Daniel J. Harrington) or "answers" (Bart Ehrman) to evil that these biblical scholars have identified. These scholars see a range of responses including punishment for sin, teaching or testing, or the means to some greater good.

Gregory Boyd, while appreciating "expositions of various biblical motifs that explain why we suffer, goes on to warn that "none of these motifs claim to be a comprehensive theodicy." In agreement with Boyd, Milton Crum comments that although such biblical passages might lessen the weight of suffering, ad hoc interpretations of evils do not provide a blanket theodicy. N. T. Wright "reminds us" that "the scriptures are frustratingly indirect and incomplete in answering questions of theodicy."

=== Deuteronomic "theodic settlement" ===
Brueggemann observes that, while the various biblical books do not agree on a theodicy, there was a temporary "theodic settlement" in the biblical Book of Deuteronomy.

The "theodic settlement" in the Book of Deuteronomy interprets all afflictions as just punishment for sin, that is, as retribution. Brueggemann defines "the theological notion of retribution" as "the assumption or conviction that the world is ordered by God so that everyone receives a fair outcome of reward or punishment commensurate with his or her conduct." Brueggemann points to Psalm One as a succinct summary of this retribution theodicy: "the Lord watches over the way of the righteous, but the way of the wicked shall perish" (Psalm 1:6).

Deuteronomy elaborates its "theodic settlement" in Chapter 28. Verse two promises that "blessings shall come upon you and overtake you, if you obey the Lord your God." This general promise of blessings is followed by a lengthy list of fourteen specific blessings. But, on the other hand, verse fifteen warns that "if you will not obey the Lord your God ..., curses shall come upon you." This general warning of curses is followed by a list of fifty-four specific curses, all of which would fit into the biblical use of the word evil.

The Deuteronomic retribution theodic settlement interpreted whatever evils ("curses") people suffered as just retribution meted out by a just God. However, at least as early as the early 6th century BC, Jeremiah was asserting that the retribution theodicy was contrary to fact. Jeremiah upbraided God for endowing the wicked with prosperity: "Why does the way of the guilty prosper? Why do all who are treacherous thrive? You plant them, and they take root."

In John 9:1–34, Jesus dismisses this "theodic settlement" by explaining that "It was neither that [a blind] man sinned, nor his parents [that caused his infirmity]; but it was so that the works of God might be displayed in him."

=== The Book of Job ===
Brueggemann treats the biblical Book of Job as the prime example of the "newly voiced theodic challenges" to the "old [Deuteronomic] theodic settlement" Job "was blameless and upright, one who feared God and turned away from evil," but nonetheless he suffered "all the evil that the Lord had brought upon him." In the midst of his suffering, Job explicitly contradicted the Deuteronomic theodic settlement: "it is all one; therefore I say, [God] destroys both the blameless and the wicked."

Not only did Job challenge the Deuteronomic theodic settlement by the fact of his own innocent suffering and by explicit contradiction of the old settlement, he interrogated God, "Why do the wicked live on, reach old age, and grow mighty in power?" Brueggemann judges the fact that God had no answer to Job's why? to be so important that "the Book of Job turns on the refusal, unwillingness, or inability of [God] to answer" Job's query. Even worse, God says of himself: "... you [Satan] incited me against him to ruin him without any reason."

Brueggemann explains that the "turn" he sees in the Book of Job is a turn from seeing the 'right' as accepting the old theodic settlement. Now, he continues, "perhaps what is 'right' is Job's refusal to concede, and therefore what is celebrated is his entire defiant argument ... That is, what Yahweh intends as 'right' is that Job (Israel, humankind) should make a legitimate case" before God "without timidity or cowardice" to "carry the human question of justice into the danger zone of God's holiness."

== Bible and free-will theodicy ==
A theodicy is an attempt "to reconcile the power and goodness attributed to God with the presence of evil in the human experience." The Bible attributes both "power" and "goodness" to God.

The free-will theodicy, first developed by Augustine, defends God by placing all the blame for evil on "the misuse of free will by human beings." This free-will theodicy is "perhaps the most influential theodicy ever constructed," and it is currently "the most common theodicy"

Explaining the free-will theodicy, Nick Trakakis writes that "the free will theodicist proceeds to explain the existence of moral evil as a consequence of the misuse of our freedom." Then "the free will theodicist adds, however, that the value of free will (and the goods it makes possible) is so great as to outweigh the risk that it may be misused in various ways."

In parallel with the free-will theodicy, The New Bible Dictionary finds that the Bible attributes evil "to the abuse of free-will." Others have noted the free-will theodicy's "compatibility with and reliance upon the Genesis account of creation" and the fall of Adam and Eve into sin. Because of the compatibility between the free-will theodicy and the Genesis account of the Creation and Fall of humanity "the Fall-doctrine" has been characterized as "fundamentally an exercise in theodicy-making."

=== Free will and freedom: definition problems ===
The two terms, "freedom" and "free will," are treated together (a) because, by definition, a "free will" means a "will" that possesses "freedom" and (b) because "free will" is "commonly used" as synonymous with "freedom." Likewise, Robert Kane, writing about "what is often called the free will issue or the problem of free will," says that it "is really a cluster of problems or questions revolving around the conception of human freedom"

In writing about free will, R. C. Sproul points out that "at the heart of the problem is the question of the definition of free will." Manual Vargas adds that "it is not clear that there is any single thing that people have had in mind by the term ‘free will'." Because of the confusion created when "definitions of free will are assumed without being stated," Randy Alcorn urges, "be sure to define terms."

== Adler's kinds of freedom ==
Mortimer Adler recognized the confusion resulting from the fact that there are "several different objects men have in mind when they use the word freedom." In The Idea of Freedom, Adler resolved this confusion by distinguishing the "three kinds of freedom" that various writers have in mind when they use the word. He calls these three kinds of freedom (1) "circumstantial freedom," (2) "natural freedom," and (3) "acquired freedom." "Natural freedom" and "acquired freedom" are germane to the Bible in relation to the free-will theodicy.

=== "Natural freedom" and the Bible ===
"Natural freedom", in Adler's terminology, is the freedom of "self-determination" regarding one's "decisions or plans." Natural freedom is "(i) inherent in all men, (ii) regardless of the circumstances under which they live and (iii) without regard to any state of mind or character which they may or may not acquire in the course of their lives"

Biblical scholars find that the Bible views all humanity as possessing the "natural freedom" of the will that enables "self-determination." In this sense of the term, biblical scholars say that, although the Bible does not use the term, it assumes human "free will." For example, what Adler calls "natural freedom" matches the definition of the biblical concept of "free will" in the Westminster Dictionary of Theological Terms, namely, "the free choice of the will that all persons possess." Other scholars describe free will in the Bible as follows:

- If the phrase "free will" be taken morally and psychologically, as meaning the power of unconstrained, spontaneous, voluntary, and therefore responsible, choice, the Bible everywhere assumes that all men, as such, possess it, unregenerate and regenerate alike. The New Bible Dictionary.

- "Free will is clearly taught in such Scripture passages as Matthew 23:37 ... and in Revelation 22:17." Archaeology and Bible History.

- The Bible assumes that all human beings have "free will" in the sense of "the ability to make meaningful choices," that is, "the ability to have voluntary choices that have real effects." If God Is Good.

- We make willing choices, choices that have real effect .... In this sense, it is certainly consistent with Scripture to say that we have "free will." Bible Doctrine.

==== Debate on "natural freedom" ====
The proper interpretation of biblical passages relating to the freedom of the human will has been the subject of debate for most of the Christian era. The Pelagius versus Augustine of Hippo debate over free will took place in the 5th century. The Erasmus versus Martin Luther arguments in 16th century included disagreements about free will, as did the Arminians versus Calvinists debates in the late 16th and early 17th centuries.

There is still no resolution of the free will debate because as Robert Kane observes, "debates about free will are more alive than ever today."

=== "Acquired freedom" and the Bible ===
"Acquired freedom," in Adler's terminology, is the freedom "to live as [one] ought to live," and to live as one ought requires "a change or development" whereby a person acquires "a state of mind, or character, or personality" that can be described by such qualities as "good, wise, virtuous, righteous, holy, healthy, sound, flexible, etc."

Thus, while Adler ascribes the "natural freedom" of "self-determination" to everyone, he asserts that the freedom "to live as [one] ought to live" must be acquired by "a change or development" in a person. The New Bible Dictionary finds these two distinct freedoms in the Bible:

(i) "The Bible everywhere assumes" that, by nature, everyone possesses the freedom of "unconstrained, spontaneous, voluntary, and therefore responsible, choice." The New Bible Dictionary calls this natural freedom "free will" in a moral and psychological sense of the term.

(ii) At the same time, the Bible seems "to indicate that no man is free for obedience and faith till he is freed from sin's dominion." He still possesses "free will" in the sense of voluntary choices, but "all his voluntary choices are in one way or another acts of serving sin" until he acquires freedom from "sin's dominion." The New Bible Dictionary denotes this acquired freedom for "obedience and faith" as "free will" in a theological sense.

The Bible gives a basic reason why a person must acquire a freedom "to live as [one] ought to live" when it applies Adam and Eve's sin to all humanity: "the Lord saw that the wickedness of humankind was great in the earth, and that every inclination of the thoughts of their hearts was only evil continually" (Genesis 6:5). Or, in Paul's view, "by the one man's disobedience the many were made sinners" (Romans 5:19). Thus, the Bible describes humanity as connaturally "enslaved to sin" (Romans 6:6; John 8:34). Therefore, in biblical thinking, a freedom from being "enslaved to sin" in order to "live as one ought" must be acquired because "sin" is "the failure to live up to Jesus' commandments to love God and love neighbor."

==== Jesus on acquired freedom ====
Jesus told his hearers that they needed to be made free: "if you continue in my word, you are truly my disciples; and you will know the truth, and the truth will make you free" (John 8:32). But Jesus' hearers did not understand that he was not talking about freedom from "economic or social slavery," so they responded, "we are descendants of Abraham and have never been slaves to anyone. What do you mean by saying, ‘You will be made free'?" (John 8:33)."

To clarify what he meant by being "made free," Jesus answered them, "very truly, I tell you, everyone who commits sin is a slave to sin" (John 8:34). By his words being "made free," Jesus meant being "made free" from "bondage to sin." Continuing his reply, Jesus added, "if the Son makes you free, you will be free indeed" (John 8:36). "Free indeed [ontós]" can be more literally translated "truly free" or "really free," as it is in the following translations.

- "If the son makes you free, you will be truly free" (John 8:36 New Century Bible).
- "If therefore the Son shall set you free, ye shall be really free" (John 8:36 Darby Translation).

In the John 8:32–36 passage, Jesus taught that "those who sin are slaves to their sin whether they realize it or not" and "they cannot break away from their sin." The freedom of being "truly free" or "really free" had to be acquired by being made free by "the truth," John's name for Jesus in 14:6. Thus, Jesus characterized being made "truly free" as freedom from being a "slave to sin." At the same time, the Bible holds that it is freedom for righteous living because "from the very beginning God's people were taught that the alternative to servitude was not freedom in some abstract sense, but rather freedom to serve the Lord."

==== Paul on acquired freedom ====
When the New Bible Dictionary says of humanity's connatural condition that "all his voluntary choices are in one way or another acts of serving sin," it references Romans 6:17–22. In this passage, Paul depicts the connatural human condition as being "slaves of sin." To be "set free from sin," Paul told his readers that they must "become slaves of righteousness."

Regarding the transformation from being "slaves of sin" to being "slaves of righteousness," Douglas J. Moo comments that Paul uses the image of slavery to say that "being bound to God and his will enables the person to become ‘free'" – in the sense of being free "to be what God wants that person to be." The slavery image underscores, as Moo says, that what Paul has in mind "is not freedom to do what one wants, but freedom to obey God" and that the obedience is done "willingly, joyfully, naturally," and not by coercion as with literal slaves.

== The Fall and freedom of the will ==
The Fall (sometimes lowercase) in its theological use refers to "the lapse of human beings into a state of natural or innate sinfulness through the sin of Adam and Eve." The story of the Fall is narrated in Genesis 3:1–7.

Nelson's Student Bible Dictionary describes "the fall" as "the disobedience and sin of Adam and Eve that caused them to lose the state of innocence in which they had been created. This event plunged them and all mankind into a state of sin and corruption." A Concise Dictionary of Theology provides a similar description of the Fall. In their fall, Adam and Eve "disobeyed God and so lost their innocent, ideal existence" and "brought moral evil into the world."

The Bible testifies to the deleterious impact of the Fall on all humanity. Shortly after the Fall, "the Lord saw that the wickedness of humankind was great in the earth, and that every inclination of the thoughts of their hearts was only evil continually" (Genesis 6:5). Or, in Paul's view, "sin came into the world through one man," and "by the one man's disobedience the many were made sinners" (Romans 5:12, 19).

=== Freedom of will given at creation ===
Writing about God's creation and Adam and Eve, Baker's Dictionary of Biblical Theology says that "creation is climaxed by persons who possess wills that can choose to either obey or disobey." The Book of Ecclesiasticus, which pre-Protestant Reformation churches consider part of the Bible but which Protestants classify among the Apocrypha, explicitly names freedom of the will as an element in God's creation: God "created humankind in the beginning, and he left them in the power of their own free choice" (Ecclesiasticus 15:14).

=== Freedom of will not given at creation ===
Adam and Eve were created with "free will," that is, "the ability to choose either good or evil." The Fall evidences that Adam and Eve were not created with the freedom that Paul calls being "slaves of righteousness" (Romans 6:18): a phrase that denotes "freedom to obey God – willingly, joyfully, naturally."

Critics of the free-will theodicy believe that it "fails" because "God could have created free agents without risking bringing moral evil into the world. There is nothing logically inconsistent about a free agent that always chooses the good." Relating God's creation of Adam and Eve and the Fall to theodicy, J. L. Mackie argues "there was open to [God] the obviously better possibility of making beings who would freely act but always do right." And, Mackie adds, "clearly, [God's] failure to avail himself of this possibility is inconsistent with his being both omnipotent and wholly good."

=== God and moral evil ===
The free-will theodicy justifies God by ascribing all evil to "the evil acts of human free will." At the same time, the Bible teaches that God "rules the hearts and actions of all men." The Bible contains many portrayals of God as ruling "hearts and actions" for evil. Following are a few examples:

- God said, "I will harden [Pharaoh's] heart, so that he will not let the people go" (Exodus 4:21).
- Isaiah asked, "Why, O Lord, do you make us stray from your ways and harden our heart, so that we do not fear you?" (Isaiah 63:17).
- God said, "If a prophet is deceived and speaks a word, I, the Lord, have deceived that prophet" (Ezekiel 14:9).
- John writes that those who "did not believe in [Jesus] could not believe," because, quoting Isaiah 6:10, "[God] has blinded their eyes and hardened their heart" (John 12:37–40 abr).
- God "hardens the heart of whomever he chooses" (Romans 9:18).
- "God sends [those who are perishing] a powerful delusion, leading them to believe what is false, so [they] will be condemned" (2 Thessalonians 2:11–12).
- "Those who do not believe ... stumble because they disobey the word, as they were destined [by God] to do" (1 Peter 2:7–8).

== Theodicy unresolved ==
The existence of evil in the world, in the view of Raymond Lam, "presents the gravest challenge to the existence of an all-powerful, all-knowing, all-loving God." Lam also observes that "no theodicy is easy."

Regarding theodicy and the Bible, Baker's Evangelical Dictionary of Biblical Theology concludes that "the Bible does not answer the oft-posed problem of how a just, omnipotent, and loving God could permit evil to exist in a universe he had created."

With no "definitive answer" to the theodic question, "debates about theodicy continue among believers and unbelievers alike," observes Robert F. Brown. Therefore, Brown adds, "theodicy remains a perennial concern for thoughtful religious commitment." Theodicy remains a "perennial concern" because, Brown reports, "how the divine can be compatible with the existence of evil in the world has perplexed profound thinkers and ordinary people right down to the present day."

== See also ==
- Augustinian theodicy
- Babylonian Theodicy
- Irenaean theodicy
