= Ikuta Yorozu =

- 生田 万

Personal details
- Born: 1801 Tatebayashi Domain, Kōzuke Province, Japan
- Died: July 3, 1837 (aged 35–36) Kashiwazaki, Echigo Province, Japan
- Cause of death: Suicide

Ikuta Kunihide (Japanese: 生田 國秀; 1801–1837), better known as Ikuta Yorozu (生田 万) was a Japanese student of the nationalist kokugaku school. He is remembered for his death leading an army of the poor during the Tenpō famine.

== Early life ==
Ikuta Kunihide was born in 1801 into a samurai family in the Tatebayashi Domain. His father, Ikuta Nobukatsu (生田 信勝) served as a senior retainer to the Matsudaira clan. Kunihide later took the name Yorozu.

Ikuta studied Confucianism at the domain school, the Dōgakkan (道学館), and was regarded as an intelligent and well-read pupil, but he developed an interest in the austere and idealistic Yangming school and gradually became estranged from his teachers and the other students. In 1824, when he was 23 years old, he travelled to Edo to study kokugaku under Hirata Atsutane. As one of Atsutane's two most prominent disciples, alongside Midorikawa Yoshihisa, the brother of Hirata Kanetane, he served as an administrator for the Hirata school and was respected by Atsutane, who is said to have remarked, "Kunihide will be my successor."

Ikuta had a passionate personality characterized by deep reverence for the spirits and the Emperor. He was distressed by what he saw as the cruelty and incompetence of the Tokugawa government. When he began to openly criticize the government, Atsutane, fearing that he would be arrested, advised him to return home to his domain.

== Banishment ==
In 1828, Ikuta submitted an essay, Iwa ni musu koke (岩にむす苔), to the authorities of the Tatebayashi Domain. In this essay, he proposed various reforms to improve the domain's administration and agriculture and thereby better the lives of the peasants. His proposals were harshly rebuked, and he was immediately banished from the domain. Suddenly homeless, he wandered from place to place and became increasingly embittered against society.

In 1833, he completed a small book titled Kogaku Nisenmon (古学二千文) in which he depicted ancient Japan as a land of light taxes and lenient laws (薄税寛刑, hakuzei kankei) ruled over by a benevolent Emperor. This book was later used by the Hirata school in Edo as a textbook for learning calligraphy.

In 1836, he moved to Kashiwazaki in Echigo Province and established a school where he taught kokugaku. He was well liked for providing food to the poor.

== Rebellion ==
In 1837, Echigo Province was stricken by famine, and the farmers of the region were in a desperate state. Ikuta appealed to the local office of the Kuwana Domain for the distribution of food from government granaries for famine relief, but his appeals were repeatedly ignored. When news of Ōshio Heihachirō's revolt reached Echigo, Ikuta rallied a force of armed farmers under banners calling to "kill the traitors of the nation as an offering to the gods" (奉天命誅国賊) and attacked the Kuwana troops stationed in Kashiwazaki. However, Ikuta failed to secure the support of local gōnō and he was defeated upon the arrival of government reinforcements. Surrounded, Ikuta died by suicide.
