= Irenaean theodicy =

Christian theodicy

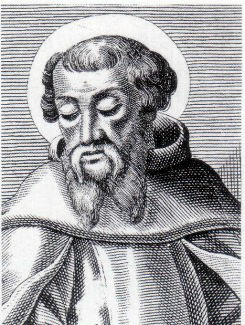
Saint Irenaeus, the second-century philosopher and theologian who inspired the development of the Irenaean theodicy.

The Irenaean theodicy is a Christian theodicy (a response to the problem of evil). It defends the probability of an omnipotent and omnibenevolent (all-powerful and perfectly loving) God in the face of evidence of evil in the world. Numerous variations of theodicy have been proposed which all maintain that, while evil exists, God is either not responsible for creating evil, or he is not guilty for creating evil. Typically, the Irenaean theodicy asserts that the world is the best of all possible worlds because it allows humans to fully develop. Most versions of the Irenaean theodicy propose that creation is incomplete, as humans are not yet fully developed, and experiencing evil and suffering is necessary for such development.

The second-century Church Father, theologian and philosopher Irenaeus, after whom the theodicy is named, proposed a two-stage creation process in which humans require free will and the experience of evil to develop. Another early Christian theologian, Origen, presented a response to the problem of evil which cast the world as a schoolroom or hospital for the soul; theologian Mark Scott has argued that Origen, rather than Irenaeus, ought to be considered the father of this kind of theodicy. The theologian Friedrich Schleiermacher argued in the nineteenth century that God must necessarily create flawlessly, so this world must be the best possible world because it allows God's purposes to be naturally fulfilled. In 1966 the philosopher John Hick discussed the similarities of the preceding theodicies, calling them all "Irenaean". He supported the view that creation is incomplete and argued that the world is best placed for the full moral development of humans, as it presents genuine moral choices. The philosopher Richard Swinburne proposed that, to make a free moral choice, humans must have experience of the consequences of their own actions and that natural evil must exist to provide such choices.

The development of process theology has challenged the Irenaean tradition by teaching that God using suffering for his own ends would be immoral. The twentieth-century philosopher Alvin Plantinga's free will defense argues that, while this may be the best world God could have created, God's options were limited by the need to allow freewill. Plantinga's ultimate response to the problem of evil is that it is not a problem that can be solved. Christians simply cannot claim to know the answer to the "Why?” of suffering and evil. Plantinga stresses that this is why he does not proffer a theodicy but only a defense of theistic belief as rational in the face of unanswered questions. The philosopher Dewi Zephaniah Phillips and the author Fyodor Dostoevsky challenged the instrumental use of suffering, suggesting that love cannot be expressed through suffering. However, Dostoyevsky also states that the beauty of love is evident, in that love can continue to grow, withstand and overcome even the most evil acts. The philosopher Michael Tooley argued that the magnitude of suffering is excessive and that, in some cases, cannot lead to moral development. The theologian Henri Blocher criticised Hick's universalism, arguing that such a view negates free will, which was similarly important to the theodicy.

== Outline ==
The Irenaean theodicy was first identified as a form of theodicy by John Hick in Evil and the God of Love (1966). For Augustine of Hippo, humans were created perfect but fell, and thereafter continued to choose badly of their own freewill. In Irenaeus' view, humans were not created perfect, but instead, must strive continuously to move closer to it. The Irenaean theodicy is distinguished by its acceptance that God is responsible for evil, but that he is not at fault since it is necessary for a greater good.

The key points of a soul-making theodicy begin with its metaphysical foundation:

1. "The purpose of God in creating the world was soul-making for rational moral agents."
2. Humans choose their responses to the soul-making process, thereby developing moral character.
3. This requires that God remain hidden, otherwise freewill would be compromised.
4. This hiddenness is created, in part, by the presence of evil in the world.
5. The distance of God makes moral freedom possible, while the existence of obstacles makes meaningful struggle possible.
6. The end result of beings who complete the soul-making process is "a good of such surpassing value" that it justifies the means.
7. Those who complete the process will be admitted to the kingdom of God where there will be no more evil.

Hick argues that, for suffering to have soul-making value, "human effort and development must be present at every stage of existence including the afterlife".

=== Evidential problem of evil ===
The Irenaean theodicy is a response to the evidential problem of evil which raises the problem that, if an omnipotent and omnibenevolent (all-powerful and perfectly loving) God exists, there should be no evil in the world. Evidence of evil in the world would make the existence of God improbable. The theodicy attempts to demonstrate that the existence of God remains probable, despite the occurrence of evil.

=== Creation and development of humans ===
According to the Irenaean tradition, humans are not created perfectly, but in a state of imperfection. The theodicy teaches that creation has two stages: humans were first created in the image of God, and will then be created in the likeness of God. Humans are imperfect because the second stage is incomplete, entailing the potential, not yet actualised, for humans to reach perfection. To achieve this likeness of God, humans must be refined and developed. The theodicy proposes that evil and suffering exists in the world because this is the best way for humans to develop. As such, the Irenaean theodicy is sometimes referred to as the "soul-making theodicy", a phrase taken from the poet John Keats.

=== Greatest possible world ===
Typical to variations of the Irenaean theodicy is the notion that the present world is the greatest possible world, or the best of all possible worlds. This is based on the Irenaean idea of human development, suggesting that the best possible world would be best suited to human development: a world containing evil and suffering would allow development better than one which does not, so the world is considered the best possible world.

== Development ==
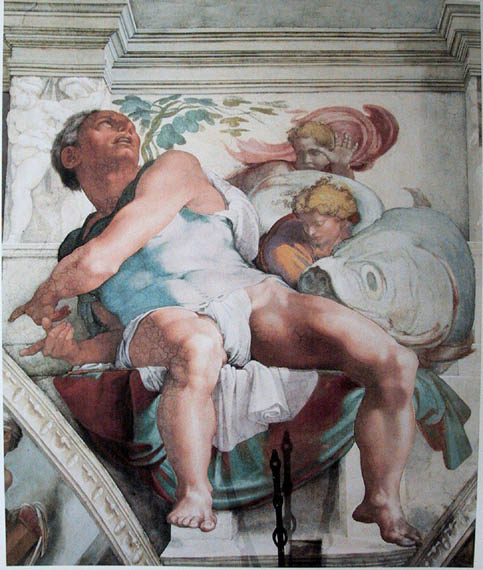
Irenaeus used the biblical example of Jonah as someone whose suffering brought about a greater good

=== Irenaeus ===
According to its proponents, the second-century philosopher Irenaeus developed a theodicy based on the idea that the creation of humans is still in progress. He proposed that creation consists of two distinct parts: first in the image of God, then in the likeness of God. Irenaeus believed the first stage is complete, but the second stage requires humans to develop and grow into the likeness of God, a stage which Irenaeus believed is still in progress. He believed that, in order to achieve moral perfection, humans must be given free choice, with the actual possibility of choosing to do evil. Irenaeus argued that for humans to have free will, God must be at an epistemic distance (or intellectual distance) from humans, far enough that belief in God remains a free choice. As Irenaeus said, "there is no coercion with God, but a good will [towards us] is present with Him continually".

Because Irenaeus saw the purpose of the world to be the development of the moral character of humans, he believed that a good world would be best suited to that purpose. Irenaeaus believed that this world would include some suffering and evil to help people draw closer to God. He perceived God's declaration in the Book of Genesis that his creation was good to mean that the world is fit for purpose, rather than being free from suffering. To illustrate the benefits of suffering, Irenaeus cited the Biblical example of Jonah, from the Book of Jonah. His suffering, being swallowed by a whale, both enabled God's plan to be fulfilled and also brought Jonah closer to God: Jonah ended up repenting for his sin and the people of Nineveh turn to God. As Irenaeus said, "For as He patiently suffered Jonah to be swallowed by the whale, not that he should be swallowed up and perish altogether, but that, having been cast out again, he might be the more subject to God, and might glorify Him the more who had conferred upon him such an unhoped-for deliverance, and might bring the Ninevites to a lasting repentance, so that they should be converted to the Lord, who would deliver them from death".

Irenaeus' eschatology was based on a literal interpretation of the Bible, especially the Book of Revelation. He believed that there would be 6000 years of suffering before the world ends in a fiery purge. This fire would purify believers ahead of a new human community existing in the New Jerusalem. The afterlife, Irenaeus proposed, focuses more on time than space; he looked forward to a time in which humans are fully developed and live the life of God.

=== Origen ===
The early Christian theologian Origen also presented suffering as necessary for the development of human beings. The theologian Mark Scott has argued that John Hick's theodicy is more closely aligned with Origen's beliefs than Irenaeus' and ought to be called an "Origenian theodicy". Origen used two metaphors for the world: it is a school and a hospital for souls, with God as Teacher and Physician, in which suffering plays both an educative and healing role. Through an allegorical reading of Exodus and the books of Solomon, Origen casts human development as a progression through a series of stages which take place in this life and after death. Origen believed that all humans will eventually reach heaven as the logical conclusion of God being 'all in all'. Hell is a metaphor for the purification of our souls: our sinful nature goes to 'Hell' and our original nature, created by God, goes to heaven. Scott argues that significant aspects of Origen's theology mean that there is a stronger continuation between it and Hick's theodicy. These aspects are Origen's allegorical treatment of Adam and Eve, the presentation of the world as a hospital or schoolroom, the progression he advocates of the human soul, and his universalism.

=== Friedrich Schleiermacher ===
In the early 19th century, Friedrich Schleiermacher wrote Speeches and The Christian Faith, proposing a theodicy which John Hick later identified as Irenaean in nature. Schleiermacher began his theodicy by asserting that God is omnipotent and benevolent and concluded that, because of this, "God would create flawlessly". He proposed that it would be illogical for a perfect creation to go wrong (as Augustine had suggested) and that evil must have been created by God for a good reason. Schleiermacher conceived a perfect world to be one in which God's purposes can naturally be achieved, and will ultimately lead to dependence on God. He conceived sin as being an obstruction to humanity's dependence on God, arguing that it is almost inevitable, but citing Jesus as an example of a sinless man, whose consciousness of God was unobstructed. This theology led Schleiermacher to universalism, arguing that it is God's will for everyone to be saved and that no person could alter this.

If we proceed on this definite assumption that all belonging to the human race are eventually taken up into loving fellowship with Christ, there is nothing for it but this single divine fore-ordination.

— Friedrich Schleiermacher, The Christian Faith

=== John Hick ===
John Hick, a philosopher of religion, published Evil and the God of Love in 1966, in which he developed a theodicy based on the work of Irenaeus. Hick distinguished between the Augustinian theodicy, based on free will, and the Irenaean theodicy, based on human development. Hick framed his theodicy as an attempt to respond to the problem of evil in light of scientific development, such as Charles Darwin's theory of evolution, and as an alternative to the traditionally accepted Augustinian theodicy. Rejecting the idea that humans were created perfectly and then fell away from perfection, Hick instead argued that humans are still in the process of creation. He interpreted the fall of man, described in the Book of Genesis, as a mythological description of the current state of humans.

Hick used Irenaeus' notion of two-stage creation and supported the belief that the second stage, being created into the likeness of God, is still in progress. He argued that to be created in the image of God means to have the potential for knowledge of and a relationship with God; this is fulfilled when creation in the likeness of God is complete. Humanity currently exists in the image of God and is being developed into spiritual maturity. Hick proposed that human morality is developed through the experience of evil and argued that it is possible for humans to know God, but only if they choose to out of their own free will. Hick acknowledges that some suffering seems to serve no constructive purpose and instead just damages the individual. Hick justifies this by appealing to the concept of mystery. He argues that, if suffering were always beneficial to humans, it would be impossible for humans to develop compassion or sympathy because we would know that someone who is suffering will certainly benefit from it. However, if there is an element of mystery to suffering, to the effect that some people suffer without benefit, it allows feelings of compassion and sympathy to emerge.

The value Hick placed on free will was the result of his belief that it is necessary for genuine love: he believed that love which is not freely chosen is valueless. A genuinely loving God, he argued, would have created humans with free will. Hick held that it would be possible for God to create beings that would always freely choose to do good, but argued that a genuine relationship requires the possibility of rejection. Irenaeus' notion of humans existing at an "epistemic distance" from God also influenced Hick, as it would ensure a free choice in belief in God. Hick argued that a world without pain or suffering would prevent moral development; such a world would have no fixed structure, or have a structure subject to divine intervention, preventing humans from coming to any harm. Hick argued that this would leave humans unable to help or harm one another, allowing them no moral choices and so preventing moral development.

The nature of his theodicy required Hick to propose an eschatology in which humans are fully morally developed. He proposed a universalist theory, arguing that all humans would eventually reach heaven. Hick believed that there would be no benefit or purpose to an eternal Hell, as it would render any moral development inconsequential. The eternal suffering of Hell could not be explained in terms of human development, so Hick rejected it. Despite this, he did not reject the existence of Hell outright, as to do so could make living morally in this life irrelevant. Rather, he argued that Hell exists as a mythological concept and as a warning of the importance of this life.

=== Richard Swinburne ===
The philosopher Richard Swinburne proposed a version of the Irenaean theodicy based on his libertarian view of free will, a view that one's free actions are not caused by any outside agent. He argued that, in order for people to make free moral decisions, they must be aware of the consequences of such decisions. Knowledge of these consequences must be based on experience—Swinburne rejected the idea that God could implant such knowledge, arguing that humans would question its reliability. Swinburne argued that humans must have first hand experience of natural evil in order to understand the consequences of moral evil and that for God to give humans moral free will, he must allow human suffering. Swinburne conceived Hell as being a separation from God, rejecting the notion of eternal physical punishment, and argued that people who had chosen to reject God throughout their lives would continue to do so after death.

== Reception ==
=== Process theology ===
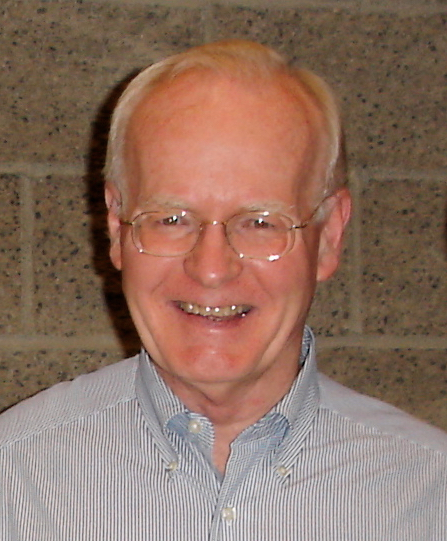
The process theologian David Ray Griffin contested "the utility of soul making"

The development of process theology has presented a challenge to the Irenaean theodicy. The doctrine proposes that God is benevolent but suggests that his power is restricted to persuasion, rather than coercion and so is unable to prevent certain evil events from occurring. Process theology accepts God's indirect responsibility for evil, but maintains that he is blameless, and does everything in his power to bring about good. In his introduction to process theology, C. Robert Melse argued that, although suffering does sometimes bring about good, not all suffering is valuable and that most does more harm than good. The process theologian David Ray Griffin contested "the utility of soul making". He argued that the Irenaean theodicy supposes that God inflicts pain for his own ends, which Griffin regarded as immoral.

=== Dewi Zephaniah Phillips ===
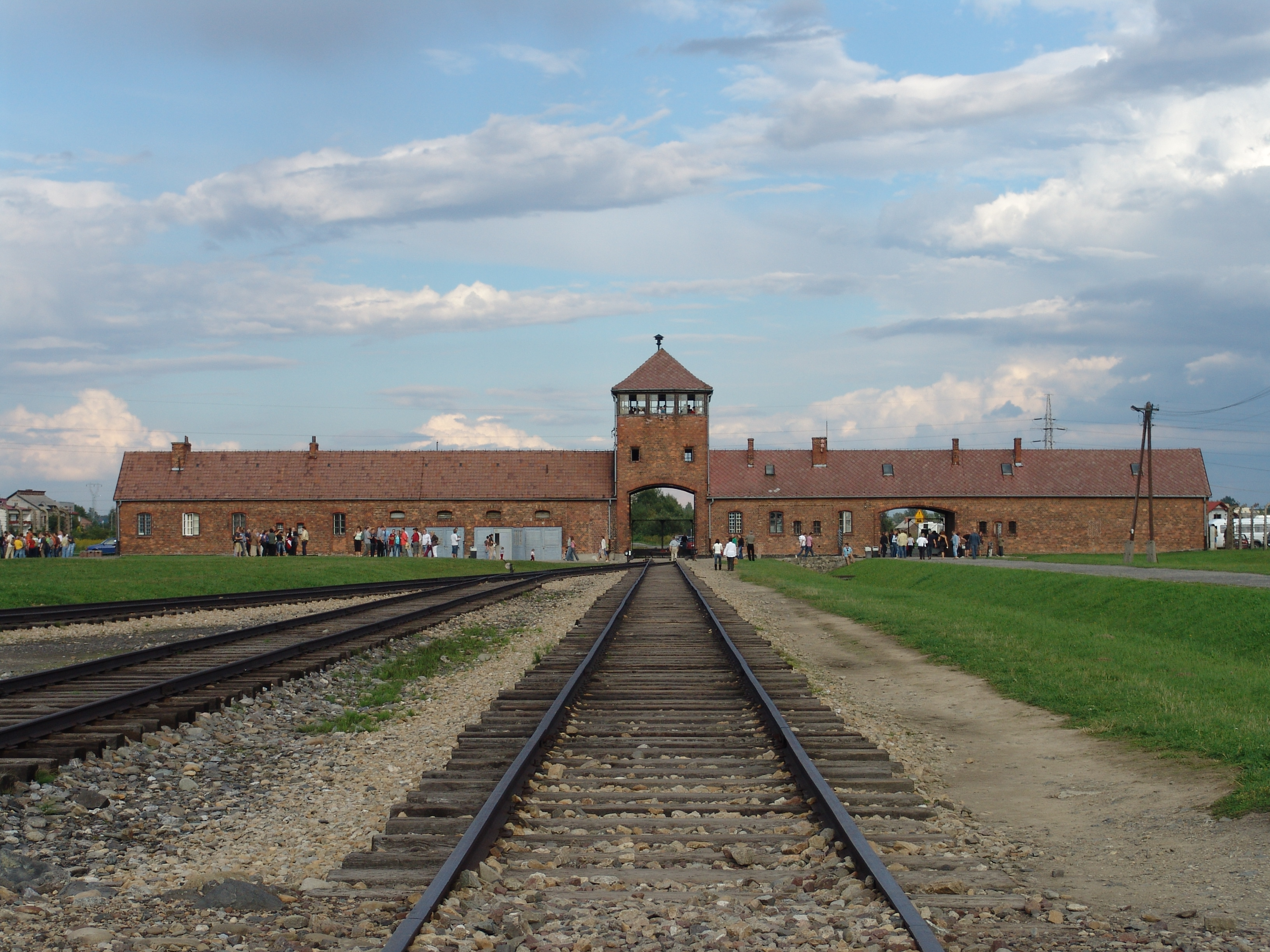
D. Z. Phillips argued that the magnitude of suffering experienced in the Holocaust cannot be justified by any apparent gains

The philosopher Dewi Zephaniah Phillips published The Problem of Evil and the Problem of God in 2004, presenting a challenge to the Irenaean theodicy. Phillips maintained throughout his work that humans are incapable of fully understanding God, and presented an understanding of the moral diversity of human existence. With reference to the suffering of the Holocaust, he rejected any theodicy which presents suffering as instrumental, arguing that such suffering cannot be justified, regardless of any good that comes of it. Edward Feser, a Catholic philosopher, recalls that D. Z. Phillips critiqued the Irenaean theodicy in his classes, summarising its essence as, "Here you go, a bit of cancer should help toughen you up!"

G. Stanley Kane asserts that human character can be developed directly in constructive and nurturing loving ways, and it is unclear why God would consider or allow evil and suffering to be necessary or the preferred way to spiritual growth. Hick answers that "...one who has attained to goodness by meeting and eventually mastering temptation, and thus by rightly making responsible choices in concrete situations, is good in a richer and more valuable sense than would be one created ab initio in a state either of innocence or of virtue. In the former case, which is that of the actual moral achievements of mankind, the individual’s goodness has within it the strength of temptations overcome, a stability based upon an accumulation of right choices, and a positive and responsible character that comes from the investment of costly personal effort."

However, the virtues identified as the result of "soul-making" may only appear to be valuable in a world where evil and suffering already exist. A willingness to sacrifice oneself in order to save others from persecution, for example, is virtuous because persecution exists. Likewise, the willingness to donate one's meal to those who are starving is valuable because starvation exists. If persecution and starvation did not occur, there would be no reason to consider these acts virtuous. If the virtues developed through soul-making are only valuable where suffering exists, then it is not clear what would be lost if suffering did not exist. C. Robert Mesle says that such a discussion between genuine and apparent evil and good presupposes that such virtues as charity are only instrumentally valuable instead of intrinsically valuable.

=== Fyodor Dostoyevsky ===
The Russian novelist Fyodor Dostoyevsky presented a similar argument in his novel The Brothers Karamazov. This is, however, not a final argument, given the nature of Dostoyevsky's work as polyphonic. In the novel, the character Ivan Karamazov presents an account of incredible cruelty to innocent people and children to his theist brother, Alyosha. Following this, Ivan asks his brother if he would, hypothetically, choose to be the architect of the eternal happiness of mankind, which would come into existence, if, and only if he would torture an innocent child, a necessary evil, after which this eternal happiness would come into existence.

"Would you consent to be the architect under those conditions? Tell me honestly!"

"No, I wouldn't agree," said Alyosha quietly.

— Fyodor Dostoyevsky, The Brothers Karamazov, p. 308

But Dostoyevsky's work, polyphonic in nature, also states that the love Christ showed to all people and for all people, which is Alyosha's final stance in the novel, is the only good, and in the face of evil, the beauty that will save the world.

=== Michael Tooley ===
Writing in the Internet Encyclopedia of Philosophy, Michael Tooley rejects the Irenaean theodicy as unsatisfactory, arguing that the magnitude of suffering experienced by some people is excessive, supporting Eleonore Stump's view that the suffering endured by those with terminal illnesses cannot be for moral development, and that such illnesses do not fall more often upon those seemingly immoral or in need of development. He also challenged the suffering both of animals and of young children. Neither of these instances of suffering serve any useful purpose, as they cannot lead to moral development. Finally, he questioned whether the current universe is the best possible world for the moral development of humans. Citing the examples of those who die young and those who experience too great a pain to learn from it, as well as people who suffer too little to learn anything, he suggests this world is not ideally suited to human development.

The Irenaean theodicy is challenged by the assertion that many evils do not promote spiritual growth, but can instead be destructive of the human spirit. Hick acknowledges that this process often fails in our world. Horrendous suffering often leads to dehumanization, and its victims become angry, bitter, vindictive and spiritually worse. Yet, life crises are a catalyst for change that is often positive. The neurologists Bryan Kolb and Bruce Wexler indicate this has to do with the plasticity of the brain. The brain is highly plastic in childhood development, becoming less so by adulthood once development is completed. Thereafter, the brain resists change. The neurons in the brain can only make permanent changes "when the conditions are right" because the brain's development is dependent upon the stimulation it receives. When the brain receives the powerful stimulus that experiences like bereavement, life-threatening illness, and other deeply painful experiences provide, a prolonged and difficult internal struggle, where the individual completely re-examines their self-concept and perceptions of reality, reshapes neurological structures. The literature refers to turning points, defining moments, crucible moments, and life-changing events. These are experiences that form a catalyst in an individual's life so that the individual is personally transformed, often emerging with a sense of learning, strength and growth, that empowers them to pursue different paths than they otherwise would have.

=== Henri Blocher ===
The theologian Henri Blocher criticised the universalism of Hick's theory. Blocher argued that universalism contradicts free will, which is vital to the Irenaean theodicy, because, if everyone will receive salvation, humans cannot choose to reject God. Hick did attempt to address this issue: he argued that a free action is one which reflects that character of a person, and that humans were created with a "Godward bias", so would choose salvation. Blocher proposed that Hick must then accept a level of determinism, though not going all the way.

== See also ==
- Augustinian theodicy
- Problem of evil
- Religious responses to the problem of evil
- Theodicy
- Theodicy and the Bible

== Bibliography ==
- Alles, Gregory; Ellwood, Robert (2006). The encyclopedia of world religions. Infobase Publishing. ISBN 978-0-8160-6141-9.
- Attfield, Robin (2006). Creation, evolution and meaning. Ashgate Publishing. ISBN 978-0-7546-0475-4.
- Barnhart, Joe (2005). Dostoevsky's polyphonic talent. University Press of America. ISBN 978-0-7618-3097-9.
- Bennett, Gaymon; Peters, Ted; Hewlett, Martinez J.; Russell, Robert John (2008). The evolution of evil. Vandenhoeck & Ruprecht. ISBN 978-3-525-56979-5.
- Blocher, Henri (2005). Evil and the Cross: An Analytical Look at the Problem of Pain. Kregel Academic. ISBN 978-0-8254-2076-4.
- Bretherton, Luke (2011). Christianity and Contemporary Politics: The Conditions and Possibilites of Faithful Witness. John Wiley & Sons. ISBN 978-1-4443-5769-1.
- Campbell, Hugh; Wilkinson, Michael (2010). Philosophy of Religion: An Introduction. Continuum International Publishing Group. ISBN 978-1-4411-6773-6.
- Canfield, John V. (1997). The philosophy of the English-speaking world in the twentieth century: Meaning, knowledge, and value, Part 2. Vol. 10 of Routledge history of philosophy. Routledge. ISBN 978-0-415-05605-2.
- Cheetham, David (2003). John Hick: a critical introduction and reflection. Ashgate Publishing. ISBN 978-0-7546-1599-6.
- Cottingham, John (1996). Western philosophy: an anthology. Wiley-Blackwell. ISBN 978-0-631-18627-4.
- Davis, Stephen T. (2001). Encountering evil: live options in theodicy. Westminster John Knox Press. ISBN 978-0-664-22251-2.
- Engel, S. Morris; Soldan, Angelika; Durand, Kevin (2007). The Study of Philosophy. Rowman & Littlefield. ISBN 978-0-7425-4892-3.
- Erickson, Millard (1998). Christian Theology. Baker Academic. ISBN 978-0-8010-2182-4.
- Geivett, R. Douglas (1995). Evil & the Evidence For God: The Challenge of John Hick's Theodicy. Temple University Press. pp. 151–169. ISBN 978-1-56639-397-3.
- Hall, Lindsey (2003). Swinburne's hell and Hick's universalism: are we free to reject God?. Ashgate Publishing. ISBN 978-0-7546-3400-3.
- Hick, John (2010). Evil and the God of Love. Palgrave Macmillan. ISBN 978-0-230-25279-0.
- Irenaeus (c. 180). Adversus haereses (Against Heresies). from the Ante-Nicene Fathers collection. T. & T. Clark, Edinburgh.
- Melse, C. Robert (1993). Process theology: a basic introduction. Chalice Press. ISBN 978-0-8272-2945-7.
- Little, Bruce Alva (2005). A creation-order theodicy: God and gratuitous evil. University Press of America. ISBN 978-0-7618-2989-8.
- Migliore, Daniel (2004). Faith seeking understanding: an introduction to Christian theology. Wm. B. Eerdmans Publishing. ISBN 978-0-8028-2787-6.
- Minns, Denis (2010). Irenaeus: An Introduction. Continuum International Publishing Group. ISBN 978-0-567-03366-6.
- Pojman, Louis; Rea, Michael (2011). Philosophy of Religion: An Anthology. Cengage Learning. ISBN 978-1-111-30544-4.
- Scott, Mark S.M. (July 2010). "Suffering and Soul-Making: Rethinking John Hick's Theodicy". The Journal of Religion. 90 (3): 313–334. doi:10.1086/651707. JSTOR 651707. S2CID 170899610.
- Svendsen, Lars Fr. H. (2010). A philosophy of evil. Translated by Kerri A. Pierce. Dalkey Archive Press. ISBN 978-1-56478-571-8.
- Sharma, Arvind (2006). A primal perspective on the philosophy of religion. Springe. p. 88. ISBN 978-1-4020-5013-8.
- Stilwell, Gary A. (2009). Where Was God: Evil, Theodicy, and Modern Science. Outskirts Press. ISBN 978-1-4327-3529-6.
- Stump, Eleonore (1999). Philosophy of religion: the big questions. Wiley-Blackwell. ISBN 978-0-631-20604-0.
- Thiselton, Anthony C. (2005). A concise encyclopedia of the philosophy of religion. Baker Academic. ISBN 978-0-8010-3120-5.
- Vermeer, Paul (1999). Learning theodicy: the problem of evil and the praxis of religious education. BRILL. ISBN 978-90-04-11650-4.
