= Nick Trakakis =

Australian philosopher

Nick Trakakis is an Australian philosopher who is assistant director of the Centre for Philosophy and Phenomenology of Religion of the Australian Catholic University. He has previously taught at Monash University and Deakin University, and during 2006–2007 he was a postdoctoral research fellow at the Centre for Philosophy of Religion at the University of Notre Dame. He works mainly at the intersections of philosophy (in both the analytic and Continental traditions), religion, and theology.

== Education ==
Trakakis completed a Bachelor of Theology degree at St Andrew's Greek Orthodox Theological College (Sydney, Australia) and a Bachelor of Arts degree at the University of New England, Australia, before going on to receive a First Class Honours in Philosophy from the University of Melbourne. His doctoral research, undertaken at Monash University, concentrated on the so-called 'evidential problem of evil', that is, the problem of determining whether the existence of human and animal suffering provides good evidence against the existence of God. A revised version of his thesis was published by Springer under the title of The God Beyond Belief.

== Work ==
In a number of journal articles and in his recent monograph, The God Beyond Belief, Trakakis considers various aspects of the evidential problem of evil, particularly as this has been formulated and developed by William Rowe. Trakakis has also written about such topics in the philosophy of religion as the omnipotence of God, determinist models of divine providence, Wittgensteinian non-realism, and the doctrine of karma. In theology and church history, he has published his views on the ordination of women, the infallibility of the church, the iconoclast controversy, and the work of Gregory Palamas.

=== The evidential argument from evil ===
The main conclusion reached by Trakakis is that Rowe's evidential argument from evil, or a version thereof, succeeds in showing that the existence of certain kinds of evil provides strong evidence against the existence of God. The possibility, however, is always left open that there may well be other evidence in support of the existence of God which outweighs or defeats the evidence of evil. (He, in fact, used to believe that the evidence in support of the existence of God is a defeater and was a theist, but has since then "severed his ties with Orthodoxy, and Christianity in particular, for reasons such as exclusivism, hierarchism, ritualism, ethnocentrism; the logical problem of the trinity and incarnation, the anachronism of metaphysics with regards to the content of biblical texts, and the problems of dogmatism with the incompatibility of commitment to institutionalized religion with the pursuit of truth and wisdom.)

This conclusion is based on, first, the rejection the sceptical theist's appeal to mystery, and second, the inadequacy of standard theodicies to explain the existence of natural evil.

Trakakis argues that there is no good reason to accept the currently popular 'sceptical theist' response to the evidential problem of evil – that is, the response that we do not know, and we cannot be expected to know, what God's reasons are for permitting evil. Trakakis has, for example, argued that the sceptical theist position of Kirk Durston – a position which maintains that the complexity of history is such that we cannot pass judgement on the overall moral value of any particular historical event – leads to an implausible form of moral scepticism.

Trakakis also maintains that some of the major theodicies that have been offered by theists (e.g., the free will theodicy, the soul-making theodicy) fail to explain why God would permit various types of evil, particularly 'natural evil' or suffering brought about by natural processes (e.g., natural disasters). However, he does believe that the free-will theodicy may succeed in explaining at least some kinds of moral evil. On this issue, Joel Thomas Tierno has argued against Trakakis that human freedom alone can not account for all instances of moral evil, given the scale on which we find it distributed in the world.

== Publications ==
In his current research, Trakakis is exploring various approaches to the philosophy of religion, focusing in particular on analytic and Continental approaches. He has also published two volumes of poetry and philosophical reflections, Tears (2005) and Silent Transfigurations (2006), with a third volume (Via Dolorosa) forthcoming.

Autumn Manuscripts was joint winner of the Translation Prize at the 2021 New South Wales Premier's Literary Awards.

=== Selected papers ===
- "An Epistemically Distant God? A Critique of John Hick's Response to the Problem of Divine Hiddenness", The Heythrop Journal 48 (2007): 214–26.
- "Rowe's New Evidential Argument from Evil: Problems and Prospects", Sophia: International Journal for Philosophy of Religion, Metaphysical Theology and Ethics, vol. 45, no. 1, May 2006, pp. 57–77.
- "An Interview with the Very Rev. Dr. Themistocles Adamopoulo, Apostle to the Poor and Oppressed", Theandros: An Online Journal of Orthodox Christian Theology and Philosophy, vol. 3, no. 2, Winter 2005/2006. (Available online)

=== Books ===
- Autumn Manuscripts , Tasos Leivaditis, translated by N N Trakakis, Smokestack Books, 2020. ISBN 9781916139268
- William Rowe on Philosophy of Religion: Selected Works (Editor), Ashgate Publishing, 2007. ISBN 0-7546-5558-X.
- The God Beyond Belief: In Defence of William Rowe's Evidential Argument from Evil. Springer, 2006. ISBN 1-4020-5144-1.
- Silent Transfigurations. Southwood Press, 2006. ISBN 0-646-46229-6.
- Tears: 1993–2005. ISBN 0-646-44954-0.
