= Zachary Braiterman =

American philosopher

Academic background
- Education: Stanford University
- Website: jewishphilosophyplace.com

Zachary Braiterman is an American philosopher, (Note: Braiterman's work is at the intersection of philosophy and Jewish Studies. He is the editor for the Indiana University Press New Jewish Philosophy and Thought, Series, additionally he edited The Cambridge History Of Jewish Philosophy: The Modern Era (Volume 2) with David Novak and Martin Kavka and finally his book The Shape of Revelation: Aesthetics and Modern Jewish Thought which is with Stanford University Press is categorized as Philosophy / Aesthetics and Jewish Studies.) best known for writing on the topics of Holocaust theology, Jewish thought, aesthetics, and Jewish art. He is also a professor of religion at Syracuse University.

== Education ==
Braiterman received his B.A. from the University of Massachusetts at Amherst, Department of Near Eastern and Judaic Studies (1988), and his Ph.D. from Stanford University, Department of Religious Studies (1995).

== Scholarship ==
Braiterman's scholarship on the role of theodicy in Holocaust theology has drawn responses from other theologians. In his 1998 book (God) After Auschwitz: Tradition and Change in Post-Holocaust Jewish Thought, he coined the term antitheodicy (Note: Braiterman stated his use of antitheodicy was a neologism; however, it appeared in a 1976 paper by theologian Edward Berckman, albeit in a different sense.) for a refusal to connect God with evil or a refusal to justify God. Dan Garner believed this philosophy "significantly advanced" the scholarship of Holocaust theology. Theologian and feminist scholar Melissa Raphael suggested that it could form the basis of a theology more focused on culture and community than concerns about the existence of evil, and literary theorist Brendan Cooper concluded that the concept could be applied in wider contexts, employing it for analysis of John Berryman's The Dream Songs.

Other scholars were more critical. Peter Admirand of the Mater Dei Institute of Education agreed with Braiterman's assessment of postmodernist influences on Jewish theology, but rejected the idea that theodic arguments concerning the Holocaust are required to "defend[] the indefensible." Sarah Pinnock criticized his definition of antitheodicy as unhelpful because it is overbroad, encompassing "any and all attempts to give religious meaning to evil and suffering".

Braiterman has also written extensively on the topic of Jewish art within the Jewish aniconic tradition. According to Martina Urban's review of his 2007 book The Shape of Revelation: Aesthetics and Modern Jewish Thought, he argues that religious revelation and visual art "do not constitute two radicually divergent discourses" because religion can inspire images indirectly in the same manner as expressionist painting. Raphael described him as connecting Jewish "aural" culture with visual media derived from Hellenic art traditions. Braiterman has also described the "deadening" of feeling in some Jewish art in the post-Holocaust era, such as in the works of Anselm Kiefer.

== Employment ==
As of 2016, Braiterman is a professor of religion at Syracuse University. His paper in the journal Religious Education, discussing methods of teaching Jewish topics to a largely non-Jewish audience, received a critical response that argued he was taking too postmodernist and secular an approach to religious studies. In addition to his career in academia, Braiterman has written articles about religion and culture for The Daily Beast and Huffington Post.

== Selected publications ==
- Braiterman, Zachary; Novak, David; Kavka, Martin, eds. (2012). The Cambridge History of Jewish Philosophy (Volume 2: The Modern Era). Cambridge University Press. doi:10.1017/CHOL9780521852432. ISBN 9781139016537.
- The Shape of Revelation: Aesthetics and Modern Jewish Thought. Stanford University Press. 2007. ISBN 978-0-8047-5321-0.
- (God) After Auschwitz: Tradition and Change in Post-Holocaust Jewish Thought. Princeton University Press. 1998. ISBN 978-0-691-05941-9.

== Bibliography ==
- Admirand, Peter (2012). Amidst Mass Atrocity and the Rubble of Theology: Searching for a Viable Theodicy. Cascade Books. ISBN 978-1-61097-306-9.
- Cooper, Brendan (2009). Dark Airs: John Barryman and the Spiritual Politics of the Cold War American Poetry. Peter Lang. ISBN 978-3-03911-861-8.
- Eisenstadt, Oona (2014). "The Impossibility of the Prohibition of Images". In Rashkover, Randi; Kavka, Martin (eds.). Judaism, Liberalism, and Political Theology. Indiana University Press. pp. 289–304. ISBN 978-0-253-01027-8.
- Lieberman, Sue (2015). After Genocide: How Ordinary Jews Face the Holocaust. Karnac. ISBN 978-1-78220-192-2.
- Pinnock, Sarah Katherine (2002). Beyond Theodicy: Jewish and Christian Continental Thinkers Respond to the Holocaust. State University of New York Press. ISBN 978-0-7914-5523-4.
- Raphael, Melissa (2009). Judaism and the Visual Image: A Jewish Theology of Art. Bloomsbury Academic. ISBN 978-0-8264-9498-6.
