= Benevolence =

Benevolence or Benevolent may refer to:

- Benevolent (band)
- Benevolence (phrenology), a faculty in the discredited theory of phrenology
- "Benevolent" (song), a song by Tory Lanez
- Benevolence (tax), a forced loan imposed by English kings from the 14th to 17th centuries
- USS Benevolence (AH-13), a Haven-class hospital ship
- Benevolence, Georgia, a community in the United States
- Benevolence (Law & Order), 1992 episode of the television series Law & Order

== See also ==
- Agape
- Altruism
- Good and evil
- Mettā, benevolence in Buddhism
- Omnibenevolence
- Ren (Confucianism)
