= Gary Rosenkrantz =

American philosopher

Education
- Education: Brown University (PhD)

Philosophical work
- Era: 21st-century philosophy
- Region: Western philosophy
- Institutions: University of North Carolina, Greensboro
- Main interests: metaphysics, epistemology, philosophy of religion

Gary Rosenkrantz is an American philosopher and Professor of Philosophy at the University of North Carolina, Greensboro. He is known for his work on metaphysics, epistemology, and philosophy of religion.

== Books ==
- Historical Dictionary of Metaphysics, with Joshua Hoffman, Scarecrow Press, 2011
- A Companion to Metaphysics, edited with Jaegwon Kim and Ernest Sosa, 2nd ed., Wiley-Blackwell, 2009
- The Divine Attributes, with Joshua Hoffman, Blackwell Publishers, 2002
- Substance: Its Nature and Existence, with Joshua Hoffman, Routledge, 1997
- Substance among Other Categories, with Joshua Hoffman, Cambridge University Press, 1994
- Haecceity: An Ontological Essay, Kluwer, 1993
