= Moral evil =

Morally negative intentional event

Moral evil is any morally negative event caused by the intentional action or inaction of an agent, such as a person. An example of a moral evil might be murder, war or any other evil event for which someone can be held responsible or culpable. This concept can be contrasted with natural evil, in which a bad event occurs naturally, without the intervention of an agent. The dividing line between natural and moral evil is not absolutely clear however, as some behaviours can be unintentional yet morally significant.

The distinction of evil from 'bad' is complex. Evil is more than simply 'negative' or 'bad' (i.e. undesired or inhibiting good) as evil is on its own, and without reference to any other event, morally incorrect. The validity of 'moral evil' as a term, therefore, rests on the validity of morals in ethics.

First impressions on morally evil actions dictate, how people see events, not only murders/death but the level of inhumane cruelty.

== Philosophers on moral evil ==
A philosopher named Christopher McMahon had a theory regarding moral evil which was questioning the idea that although murder is considered worse than an accidental death, preventing both deaths would be of equal value, despite the fact that murder is morally evil whereas accidental death is not.

He uses examples to demonstrate violations of moral evil and harm related to first impressions. The Holocaust is seen as morally worse than the Spanish influenza epidemic although the Holocaust had one third the number of deaths as the Spanish influenza epidemic.

== See also ==
- Conscience
- Theodicy
