= Benevolence (phrenology) =

Benevolence is a faculty in the discredited theory of phrenology.

== Concept ==
Phrenology maintains that an individual's character can be divined from the shape of his head as well as the sizes of the phrenological organs. These organs include Benevolence, which said to be the area just above the forehead. If its measurement is large in an individual, the phrenologist would conclude that he is highly benevolent. Divining benevolence in this manner does not only allow one to gauge the extent of an individual's benevolence but also allows him to arouse it.

Interaction with other faculties:

- Negative benevolence + positive firmness: authoritarian personality without consideration and humanity.
- Negative benevolence + positive destructiveness: propensity for unkindness or cruelty in one form or another.
