= Natural evil =

Evil for which no mortal agent can be held morally responsible

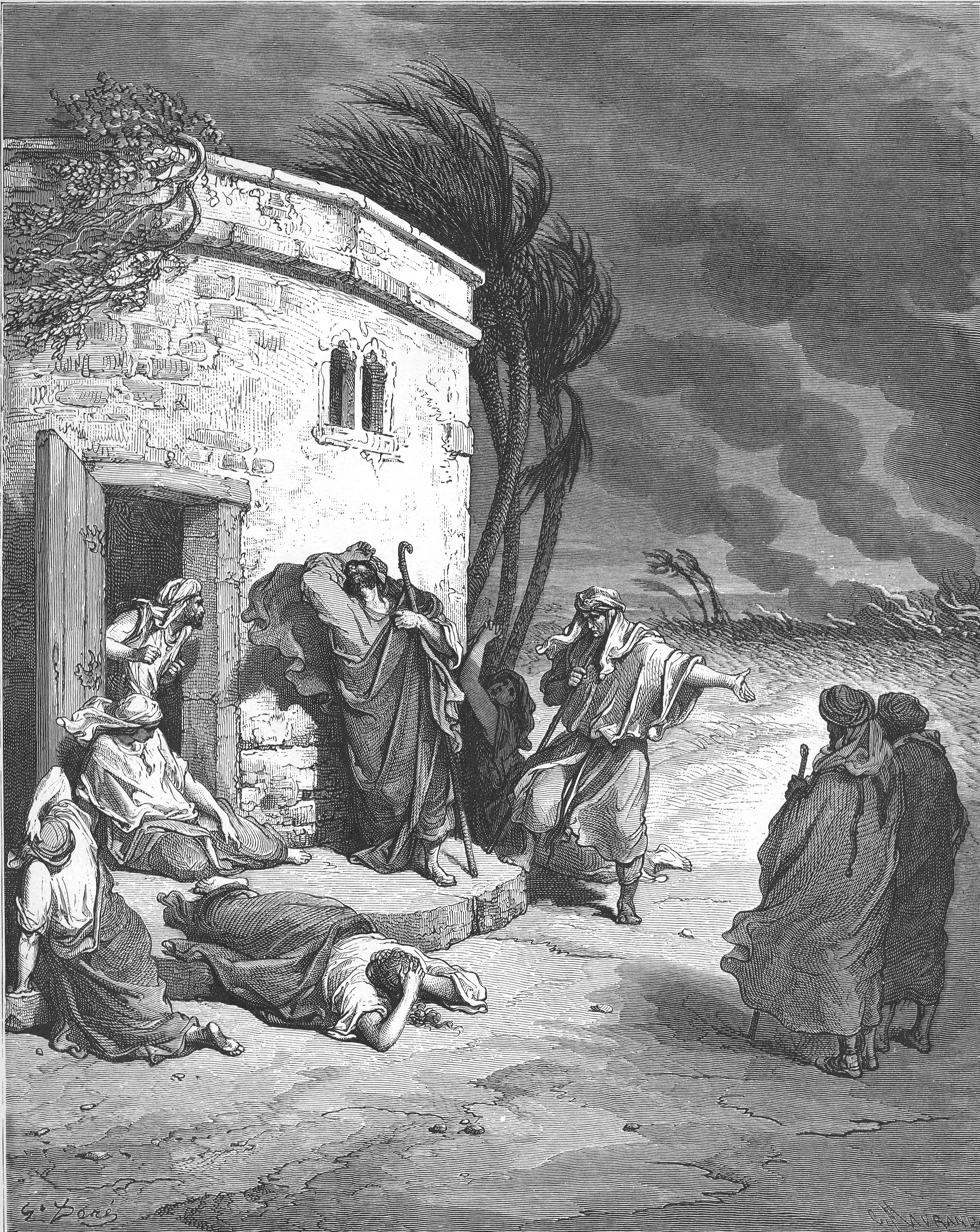
Gustave Doré: Doré's English Bible "Job Hears of His Misfortunes" (Job 1:1–22)

Natural evil is evil for which "no non-divine agent can be held morally responsible" and is chiefly derived from the operation of the laws of nature. It is defined in contrast to moral evil, which is directly "caused by human activity". In Christian theology, natural evil is often discussed as a rebuttal to the free will defense against the theological problem of evil. The argument goes that the free will defense can only justify the presence of moral evil in light of an omnibenevolent god, and that natural evil remains unaccounted for. Hence, some atheists argue that the existence of natural evil challenges belief in the existence, omnibenevolence, or omnipotence of God or any deity.

Some Christian theologians respond that natural evil is the indirect result of original sin just as moral evils are. Other theologians even argue that natural evil is directly perpetrated by demonic agents.

== Nature of natural evil ==
Moral evil results from a perpetrator, usually a person that engages in vice, either through intention or negligence. Natural evil has only victims, and is generally taken to be the result of natural processes. The "evil" thus identified is evil only from the perspective of those affected and who perceive it as an affliction. Examples include cancer, birth defects, tornadoes, earthquakes, tsunamis, hurricanes, and other phenomena which inflict suffering with apparently no accompanying mitigating good. Such phenomena inflict "evil" on victims with no perpetrator to blame.

In the Bible, God is portrayed as both the ultimate creator and perpetrator, since the "sun, moon and stars, celestial activity, clouds, dew, frost, hail, lightning, rain, snow, thunder, and wind are all subject to God's command." Examples of natural evils ascribed to God follow:

- Floods: God brought "a flood of waters on the earth" (Genesis 6:17).
- Thunder, hail, lightning: God "sent thunder and hail, and fire came down" (Exodus 9:23).
- Earthquake: By the Lord "the earth will be shaken" (Isaiah 13:13).
- Drought and Famine: God will shut off rains, so neither land nor trees yield produce (Leviticus 26:19–20).
- Forest fires: God says, "Say to the southern forest, 'I will kindle a fire in you, and it shall devour every green tree in you and every dry tree'" (Ezekiel 20:47).

However, some theologians emphasise that, whilst God is the ultimate perpetrator, natural evil is, in actuality, directly perpetrated by Satan and his demons. This is exemplified in how Satan is portrayed as the direct perpetrator of Job's suffering in the Book of Job.

Traditional theism (e.g. Thomas Aquinas) distinguishes between God's will and God's permission, claiming that while God permits evil, he does not will it. This distinction is echoed by some modern open theists, e.g. Gregory A. Boyd, who writes, "Divine goodness does not completely control or in any sense will evil." Aquinas partly explained this in terms of primary and secondary causality, whereby God is the primary (or transcendent) cause of the world, but not the secondary (or immanent) cause of everything that occurs in it. Such accounts explain the presence of natural evil through the story of the Fall of man, which affected not only human beings, but nature as well (Genesis 3:16–19). Theologian David Bentley Hart argues that "natural evil is the result of a world that's fallen into death" and says that "in Christian tradition, you don't just accept 'the world as it is'" but "you take 'the world as it is' as a broken, shadowy remnant of what it should have been." His concept of the human fall, however, is an atemporal fall: "Obviously, wherever this departure from the divine happened, or whenever, it didn't happen within terrestrial history," and "this world, as we know it, from the Big Bang up until today, has been the world of death."

Especially since the Reformation the distinction between God's will and God's permission, and between primary and secondary causality, has been disputed, notably by John Calvin. Among modern inheritors of this tradition, Mark R. Talbot ascribes evil to God: "God's foreordination is the ultimate reason why everything comes about, including the existence of all evil persons and things and the occurrence of any evil acts or events." Such models of God's complete foreordination and direct willing of everything that happens lead to the doctrines of double predestination and limited atonement.

== Natural versus moral evil ==
Jean Jacques Rousseau responded to Voltaire's criticism of the optimists by pointing out that the value judgement required in order to declare the 1755 Lisbon earthquake a natural evil ignored the fact that the human endeavour of the construction and organization of the city of Lisbon was also to blame for the horrors recounted as they had contributed to the level of suffering. It was, after all, the collapsing buildings, the fires, and the close human confinement that led to much of the death.

The question of whether natural disasters such as hurricanes might be natural or moral evil is complicated by new understandings of the effects, such as global warming, of our collective actions on events that were previously considered to be out of our control. Nonetheless, even before the beginning of the Industrial Revolution (which many believe was the beginning point of global warming), natural disasters (e.g., earthquakes, volcanoes, tsunamis, flooding, fires, disease, etc.) occurred regularly, and cannot be ascribed to the actions of humans. However, human actions exacerbate the evil effects of natural disasters. The World Wide Fund for Nature (WWF) says human activity is a key factor that turns "extreme weather events into greater natural disasters." For example, "deforestation and floodplain development" by humans turn high rainfall into "devastating floods and mudslides." When humans damage coastal reefs, remove mangroves, destroy dune systems, or clear coastal forests, "extreme coastal events cause much more loss of life and damage." Damage by tsunamis varied "according to the extent of reef protection and remaining mangrove coverage."

In Europe, human development has "contributed to more frequent and regular floods." In earthquakes, people often suffer injury or death because of "poorly designed and constructed buildings."

In the United States, wildfires that destroy lives and property aren't "entirely natural." Some fires are caused by human action and the damage inflicted is sometimes magnified by building "in remote, fire-prone areas." Dusty conditions in the West that "can cause significant human health problems" have been shown to be "a direct result of human activity and not part of the natural system."

In sum, there is evidence that some "natural" evil results from human activity and, therefore, contains an element of moral evil.

== Challenge to religious belief ==
Natural evil (also non-moral or surd evil) is a term generally used in discussions of the problem of evil and theodicy that refers to states of affairs which, considered in themselves, are those that are part of the natural world, and so are independent of the intervention of a human agent. Many atheists claim that natural evil is proof that there is no God, at least not an omnipotent, omnibenevolent one, as such a being would not allow such evil to happen to his/her creation. However, the deist position states that intervention by God to prevent such actions (or any intervention) is not an attribute of God.
