= Theodicy =

Theological attempt to resolve the problem of evil

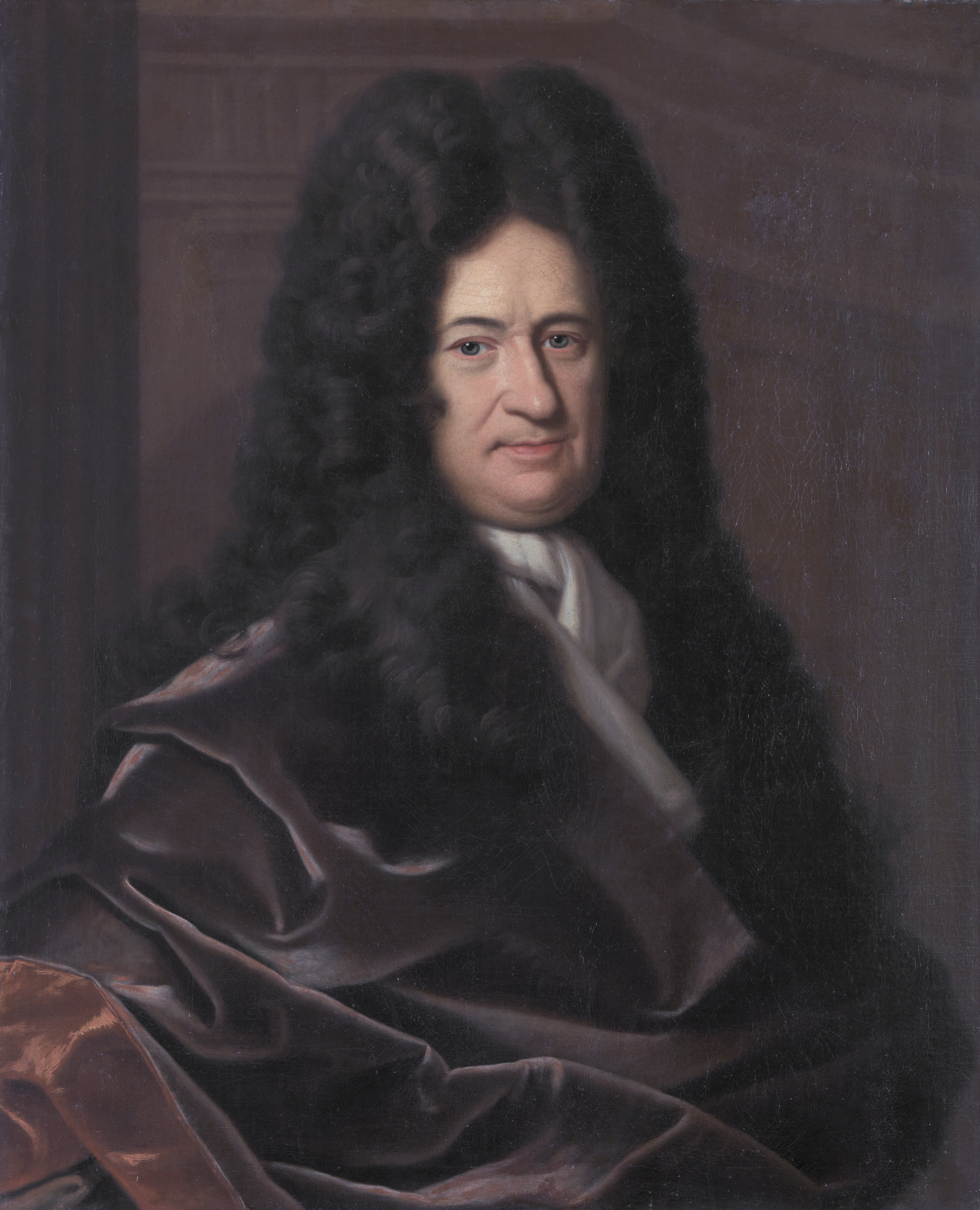
Gottfried Leibniz coined the term theodicy to justify God's existence in light of the apparent imperfections of the world.

A theodicy (from Ancient Greek θεός theos, "god" and δίκη dikē, "justice"), meaning 'vindication of God', is an argument in the philosophy of religion that attempts to resolve the problem of evil, which arises when all power (omnipotence) and all goodness (omnibenevolence) are attributed to God simultaneously.

Unlike a defense, which tries only to demonstrate that God and evil can logically coexist, a theodicy additionally provides a framework in which God and evil's existence are considered plausible. The German philosopher and mathematician Gottfried Leibniz coined the term theodicy in his book Théodicée (1710), though numerous responses to the problem of evil had previously been offered.

== Definition and etymology ==
As defined by philosopher Alvin Plantinga, a theodicy is "an answer to the question of why God permits evil". In this view, theodicy is a theological construct that attempts to vindicate God in response to the problem of evil, which appears inconsistent with the existence of an omnipotent and omnibenevolent God.

Another definition of theodicy is the vindication of divine goodness and providence in view of the existence of evil. The word theodicy derives from the Greek words Θεός, Theos, and δίκη, dikē. Theos is translated as 'God', and dikē can be translated as either 'trial' or 'judgement'. Thus, theodicy literally means 'justifying God'. People who promote theodicies are known as theodicists.

In the Internet Encyclopedia of Philosophy, philosopher Nick Trakakis proposes three additional requirements that must be included in a theodicy:

- Common sense views of the world
- Widely-held historical and scientific opinion
- Plausible moral principles

As a response to the problem of evil, a theodicy is distinct from a defense. A defense attempts to demonstrate that the occurrence of evil does not contradict God's existence, but a defense does not propose that rational beings are able to understand why God permits evil. A theodicy shows that it is reasonable to believe in God despite evidence of evil in the world, and it offers a framework that can account for why evil exists. A theodicy is often based on a prior natural theology, which seeks to prove the existence of God; a theodicy seeks to demonstrate that God's existence remains probable after the problem of evil is posed, by giving a justification for God's permitting evil to occur. Defenses propose solutions to the problem of evil, while theodicies attempt to answer the question.

Pseudo-Dionysius the Areopagite, a Greek philosopher and theologian, defines evil by those aspects that show an absence of good. Writers in this tradition saw things as reflecting "forms", so evil was a failure to reflect the appropriate form adequately—as a deficit of goodness where it should have been present. The theologian and philosopher St. Augustine also defined evil as an absence of good. The theologian and philosopher Thomas Aquinas defined evil similarly, stating that "a man is called bad insofar as he lacks a virtue, and an eye is called bad insofar as it lacks the power of sight."

The issue of the bad as an absence of the good resurfaces in the work of the philosophers Georg Wilhelm Friedrich Hegel and Martin Heidegger, in addition to the theologian Karl Barth. Similar views are held by the Neoplatonist philosophers, such as Plotinus and the contemporary Denis O'Brien, who state that evil is a privation.

there are at least two concepts of evil: a broad concept and a narrow concept. The broad concept picks out any bad state of affairs ... [and] has been divided into two categories: natural evil and moral evil. Natural evils are bad states of affairs which do not result from the intentions or negligence of moral agents. Hurricanes and toothaches are examples of natural evils. By contrast, moral evils do result from the intentions or negligence of moral agents. Murder and lying are examples of moral evils. Evil in the broad sense, which includes all natural and moral evils, tends to be the sort of evil referenced in theological contexts ... [T]he narrow concept of evil picks out only the most morally despicable ... [it] involves moral condemnation, [and] is appropriately ascribed only to moral agents and their actions.

The worldview of Marxism, "selectively elaborating Hegel", defines evil in terms of its effect. The philosopher John Kekes states the effect of evil must include actual harm that "interferes with the functioning of a person as a full-fledged agent". Christian philosophers and theologians such as Richard Swinburne and N. T. Wright also define evil in terms of effect, stating that an "act is objectively good (or bad) if it is good (or bad) in its consequences". Hinduism defines evil in terms of its effect, saying that "the evils that afflict people (and indeed animals) in the present life are the effects of wrongs committed in a previous life." Some contemporary philosophers argue that focusing on the effects of evil is inadequate for a definition, since evil can observe without actively causing harm, while remaining evil.

The philosopher Susan Neiman states that "a crime against humanity is something for which we have procedures, ... [and it] can be ... fit into the rest of our experience. To call an action evil is to suggest that it cannot [be fitted in]".

The philosopher Immanuel Kant was the first to offer a purely secular theory of evil, giving an evaluative definition of evil based on its cause, which is having a will that is not fully good. Kant has been an important influence on philosophers such as Hannah Arendt, Claudia Card, and Richard Bernstein. "Hannah Arendt ... uses the term ['radical evil'] to denote a new form of wrongdoing which cannot be captured by other moral concepts." Claudia Card says that evil is excessive wrongdoing; other philosophers such as Hillel Steiner say that evil is qualitatively, not quantitatively, distinct from mere wrongdoing.

The philosophers John Locke and Thomas Hobbes, in addition to Gottfried Wilhelm Leibniz, define good and evil in terms of pleasure and pain. Others such as the philosopher Richard Swinburne find the preceding definition to be inadequate, saying that "the good of individual humans ... consists ... in their having free will ... the ability to develop ... character ..., to show courage and loyalty, to love, to be of use, to contemplate beauty and discover truth ... All that [good] ... cannot be achieved without ... suffering along the way."

Most theorists writing about evil believe that evil action requires a certain sort of motivation ... the desire to cause harm, or to do wrong, ... pleasure (Steiner 2002), the desire to annihilate all being (Eagleton 2010), or the destruction of others for its own sake (Cole 2006). When evil is restricted to actions that follow from these sorts of motivations, theorists sometimes say that their subject is pure, radical, diabolical, or monstrous evil. This suggests that their discussion is restricted to a type, or form, of evil and not to evil per se.

Some theorists define evil by the emotions that are connected to it. "For example, Laurence Thomas believes that evildoers take delight in causing harm or feel hatred toward their victims (Thomas 1993, 76–77)." Buddhism defines various types of evil, one type being defined as behavior resulting from a failure to emotionally detach oneself from the world.

Christian theologians generally define evil in terms of both human responsibility and the nature of God: "If we take the essentialist view of Christian ethics ... evil is anything contrary to God's good nature ... (character or attributes)." The Judaic view, while acknowledging the difference between the human and divine perspective on evil, is rooted in the nature of creation itself and the inherent limitations in matter's capacity to be perfected; the action of free will includes the potential for perfection from individual effort and leaves the responsibility for evil in human hands.

As Richard Swinburne notes, "[It is] deeply central to the whole tradition of Christian (and other western) religion that God is loving toward his creation and that involves him behaving in morally good ways toward it." Within Christianity, Swinburne continues, "God is supposed to be in some way personal ... a being who is essentially eternal, omnipotent, omniscient, Creator and sustainer of the universe, and perfectly good. An omnipotent being is one who can do anything logically possible ... such a being could not make me exist and not exist at the same time but he could eliminate the stars ... An omniscient being is one who knows everything logically possible for him to know". Swinburne adds that "God's perfect goodness is moral goodness."

== Purposes ==
Theodicies are developed to answer the question of why a good God permits the manifestation of evil, thereby resolving the problem of evil. Some theodicies also address the problem of evil "to make the existence of an all-knowing, all-powerful, and all-good God consistent with the existence of evil or suffering in the world".

The philosopher Richard Swinburne says that "most theists need a theodicy, [they need] an account of reasons why God might allow evil to occur."

According to the theologian Andrew Loke, theodicies might have a therapeutical use for some people, though their main purpose is to provide a sound theistic argument rather than succeed as therapy. However, theodicies do "seek to provide hope to the sufferers that... evils can be defeated just as minor tribulations can be defeated."

== History ==
The term theodicy was coined by the German philosopher Gottfried Leibniz in his 1710 book Essais de Théodicée sur la bonté de Dieu, la liberté de l'homme et l'origine du mal (Essays of Theodicy on the Goodness of God, the Freedom of Man and the Origin of Evil). Leibniz's Théodicée was a response to skeptical Protestant philosopher Pierre Bayle; in his biographical dictionary Dictionnaire Historique et Critique, Bayle wrote that he saw no rational solution to the problem of evil, after rejecting three attempts to solve it. Bayle argued that this state of affairs must simply be accepted, because the Bible asserts the coexistence of God and evil.

In The Catholic Encyclopedia (1914), Constantine Kempf made the following argument: inspired by Leibniz's work, philosophers called their works on the problem of evil "theodicies", and philosophy focusing on God was brought under the discipline of theodicy. Kempf argued that theodicy began to include all of natural theology, meaning that theodicy came to consist of the human knowledge of God through the systematic use of reason.

In 1966, the British philosopher John Hick published his book Evil and the God of Love, in which he surveyed various Christian responses to the problem of evil and then developed his own. In his book, Hick identified and distinguished between three types of theodicy:

- Plotinian, which was named after Plotinus
- Augustinian, which had dominated Western Christianity for many centuries
- Irenaean, which was developed by the Eastern Church Father Irenaeus, a version of which Hick subscribed to himself

In the dialogue "Is God a Taoist?", published in his book The Tao Is Silent (1977), Raymond Smullyan claims to prove that it is logically impossible to have sentient beings without allowing "evil", even for God—just as it is impossible for God to create a triangle in the Euclidean plane having a sum of angles other than 180 degrees. Therefore, the capability of feeling implies free will, which may allow for "evil", understood here as hurting other sentient beings. The problem of evil happening to good or innocent people is not addressed directly in this dialogue, but both reincarnation and karma are hinted at.

=== Ancient religions ===
In his book God and Evil, the Jewish philosopher and theologian David Birnbaum states that "Writings and discourses on theodicy by Jews, Greeks, Christians, and Eastern religions have graced our planet for thousands of years." For example, in his book The Search for God in Ancient Egypt, the German scholar Jan Assman writes that theodicy was an important issue in the Middle Kingdom of Egypt (2000–1700 BC), as "in Ancient Mesopotamian and Israelite literature".

Philip Irving Mitchell of Dallas Baptist University notes that some philosophers have cast the pursuit of theodicy as modern, since earlier scholars used the problem of evil for other purposes—to support the existence of one particular god over another, explain wisdom, or explain a conversion—rather than to justify God's goodness.

The historian Sarah Iles Johnston argues that ancient civilizations—such as the ancient Mesopotamians, Greeks, Romans, and Egyptians—held polytheistic beliefs that may have enabled them to deal with the concept of theodicy differently. These religions taught the existence of many gods and goddesses, who controlled various aspects of daily life. These early religions may have avoided the question of theodicy by endowing their deities with the same flaws and jealousies that afflicted humanity.

No one god or goddess was fundamentally good or evil. This teaching explained that bad things could happen to good people if they angered a deity, because the gods could exercise the same free will that humankind possesses. Such religions taught that some gods were more inclined to be helpful and benevolent, while others were more likely to be spiteful and aggressive. In this sense, the evil gods could be blamed for misfortune, while the good gods could be petitioned with prayer and sacrifices to make things right. There was still a sense of justice, in that individuals who were right with the gods could avoid punishment.

The Epicurean paradox had already been raised c. 300 BC by the philosopher Epicurus, according to the David Hume in 1779. According to Hume, this paradox describes the problem of reconciling an omnipotent deity, with its benevolence, and the existence of evil. However, if Epicurus did discuss these particular problems in the writing that Hume attributes to him, the discussion would not have been linked with the question of an omnibenevolent and omniscient God, as Hume assumes. Hume does not cite a source or imply that he had knowledge of Epicurus's writings on this subject holding any greater weight than academic rumor or folklore.

=== Biblical theodicy ===
The biblical account of the justification of evil and suffering in God's presence shows similarities and contrasts between the Hebrew Bible and the New Testament. For the Hebrew Bible, the Book of Job is often quoted as the authoritative source of discussion. In the introduction to his book The Old Testament, the literary critic and philosopher George Steiner writes as follows:

The author of Job seeks to expand the understanding of divine justice ... beyond mere retribution, to include a system of divine sovereignty [showing] the King has the right to test His subject's loyalty ... The book of Job corrects the rigid and overly simplistic doctrine of retribution in attributing suffering to sin and punishment. It closes with a focus on the bond between creator and creation, on placing one in that, and on hope rooted in belief that God is in ultimate control.

It is generally accepted that God's responsive speeches in the Book of Job do not directly answer Job's complaints. In this book, God does not attempt to justify Himself or reveal the reason for Job's suffering; instead, these speeches focus on increasing Job's overall understanding of his relationship with God. This approach exemplifies Biblical theodicy. Bible scholars generally agree that the Bible "does not admit of a singular perspective on evil ... Instead we encounter a variety of perspectives ... Consequently [the Bible focuses on] moral and spiritual remedies, not rational or logical [justifications] ... It is simply that the Bible operates within a cosmic, moral and spiritual landscape rather than within a rationalist, abstract, ontological landscape."

The view presented in the preceding paragraph is demonstrated by God's first and second speeches in the Book of Job:

1. God's first speech concerns human ignorance and God's authority. Job had seen himself as being at the center of events in the book, lamenting that God had singled him out for oppression. God responded that Job was not the center of events—God was. God's kingdom was complex, and He governed on a large scale. Since God has dominion over the earth, Job cannot conceivably condemn Him, unless Job proves that he can perform all of the actions that God can.
2. God's second speech is against human self-righteousness. Job has vehemently accused God of thwarting justice as "the omnipotent tyrant, the cosmic thug". Some scholars interpret God's response as an admission of failure, but He proceeds to state that He has the power and, on His own timing, will ultimately bring justice.

In his book Strange Fire: Reading the Bible After the Holocaust, the scholar Tod Linafelt writes that "Isaiah is generally recognized as one of the most progressive books of the prophetic corpus." Christian theologians comment that in the Bible, "suffering is understood as having transcendent meaning ... human agency can give particular instances of suffering a mystical significance that transforms it into something productive."

Theodicy in the Book of Ezekiel (and in the Book Jeremiah 31:29–30) confronts the issue of personal moral responsibility. The book explicates the power of sin in that "The main point is stated at the beginning and at the end—'the soul that sins shall die.'" To Christians, the "power of sin" was abolished in the death and resurrection of Jesus, through which all Christians were forgiven and made righteous. The main point of the Book of Ezekiel "is explicated by a case history of a family traced through three generations". The book is not about heredity, but rather about understanding divine justice in a world under divine governance.

In his book Thematic Threads in the Book of the Twelve, the scholar Paul L. Redditt comments that "Theodicy in the Minor Prophets differs little from that in Isaiah, Jeremiah and Ezekiel." For example, the first chapter of the Book of Habakkuk raises questions about God's justice, laments God's inaction in punishing injustice, and looks for God's action in response—and then objects to what God chooses. Rather than engaging in debate, God gives Habakkuk a vision of the future that includes five oracles (or prophetic messages from God) forming a theodicy:

1. God has a plan and has appointed a time for judgment. It may be slow in coming as humans see things, but it will come.
2. The woe oracles confront the prevalence of evil in the world and the justice those acts have earned.
3. The vision of the manifestation of God is a recognition of God's power to address these issues.
4. God, as a warrior, will fight for His people.
5. The song of triumph says that the faithful will prevail by holding to trust and hope.

In Redditt's view, Joel and the other minor prophets demonstrate that theodicy and eschatology are connected in the Bible.

In the Book of Psalms, Psalm 73 presents the internal struggle created by personal suffering and the prosperity of the wicked. The writer gains perspective when he "enters the sanctuary of God" (Psalm 73:16–17), seeing that God's justice will eventually prevail. The writer reaffirms his relationship with God, is ashamed of his resentment, and chooses trust. Later in the Book of Psalms, Psalm 77 contains true outspokenness toward God, in addition to determination to hold on to faith and trust.

John M. Frame and Joseph E. Torres comment on these issues in their book Apologetics: A Justification of Christian Belief: For Christians, the scriptures provide assurance that the allowance of evil is for a good purpose based on relationship with God. In his book Providence and the Problem of Evil, Richard Swinburne writes that "Some of the good ... cannot be achieved without delay and suffering, and the evil of this world is indeed necessary for the achievement of those good purposes. ... God has the right to allow such evils to occur, so long as the 'goods' are facilitated and the 'evils' are limited and compensated in the way that various other Christian doctrines (of human free will, life after death, the end of the world, etc.) affirm ... the 'good states' which (according to Christian doctrine) God seeks are so good that they outweigh the accompanying evils."

The comments in the preceding paragraph are somewhat illustrated—according to Christian interpretation—in the Book of Exodus, when Pharaoh is described as being "raised up" so that God's name would be known throughout the world (Exodus 9:16). In Christian theology, this illustration is mirrored in Romans 9, where Paul appeals to God's sovereignty as sufficient explanation, with God's goodness known experientially by Christians.

=== Augustinian theodicy ===
The Protestant and Calvinist reading of Augustinian theodicy, as promoted primarily by John Hick, is based on the writings of Augustine of Hippo, a Christian philosopher and theologian who lived from AD 354 to 430. The Catholic (pre-Reformation) formulation of the same issue is substantially different, as outlined below. In Hick's approach, this form of theodicy argues that evil does not exist except as a privation—or corruption—of goodness, and therefore God did not create evil.

Augustinian scholars have argued that God created the world perfectly, with no evil or human suffering. Evil entered the world through the disobedience of Adam and Eve, and the theodicy casts the existence of evil as a just punishment for this original sin. The theodicy argues that humans have an evil nature in as much as it is deprived of their original goodness, form, order, and measure due to the inherited original sin of Adam and Eve; nevertheless, human nature ultimately remains good due to all existence coming from God, for if nature were completely evil (deprived of the good), it would cease to exist. The theodicy maintains that God remains blameless and good.

In the Roman Catholic reading of Augustine, the issue of just war—as developed in his book The City of God—substantially established his position on the positive justification of killing, suffering, and pain as inflicted upon an enemy when encountered in war for a just cause. Augustine asserted that peacefulness—in the face of a grave wrong that could only be stopped by violence—would be a sin. Defense of oneself or others could be necessary, especially when authorized by a legitimate authority. While not elaborating the conditions required for war to be just, Augustine nonetheless originated the phrase just war in his work The City of God.

In essence, the pursuit of peace must include the option of fighting with all of its eventualities, in order to preserve peace in the long term. Such a war could not be pre-emptive but rather defensive to restore peace. Thomas Aquinas, centuries later, used the authority of Augustine's arguments in an attempt to define the conditions under which a war could be just.

=== Irenaean theodicy ===
The Greek bishop Irenaeus (died c. 202), born in the early 2nd century, expressed ideas that explained the existence of evil as necessary for human development. Irenaeus argued that human creation consists of two parts: humans are made first in the image and then in the likeness of God. The image of God consists of having the potential to achieve moral perfection, whereas the likeness of God is the achievement of that perfection.

To attain moral perfection, Irenaeus suggested that humans must have free will. To achieve such free will, humans must experience suffering, and God must be at an epistemic distance (a distance of knowledge) from humanity. Therefore, evil exists to allow humans to develop as moral agents.

In the 20th century, John Hick collated the ideas of Irenaeus into a distinct theodicy. He argued that the world exists as a "vale of soul-making", a phrase that he drew from John Keats, and that suffering and evil must therefore occur. He argued that human goodness develops through the experience of evil and suffering.

=== Origenian theodicy ===
In direct response to John Hick's description of theodicy, the philosopher and theologian Mark Scott has indicated that neither Augustine of Hippo nor Irenaeus of Lyons provides an appropriate context for discussing Hick's theistic version of theodicy. As a theologian among the Church Fathers who articulated a theory of apokatastasis (or universal reconciliation), Origen of Alexandria provides a more direct theological comparison for discussing Hick's presentation of universal salvation and theodicy. Neither Irenaeus nor Augustine endorsed a theology of universal salvation in any form comparable to that of John Hick.

=== Relatively minor theodicies ===
The philosopher Michael Martin summarizes what he calls "relatively minor" theodicies as follows:

- The finite God theodicy maintains that God is all-good (omnibenevolent), but not all-powerful (omnipotent).
- The best of all possible worlds theodicy, a traditional theology defended by Leibniz, argues that the creation is the best of all possible worlds.
- The original sin theodicy holds that evil came into the world because of humanity's original sin.
- The ultimate-harmony theodicy justifies evil as leading to "good long-range consequences".
- The "degree of desirability of a conscious state" theodicy has been reckoned a "complex theodicy". It argues that a person's state is deemed evil only when it is undesirable to the person. However, because God cannot make a person's state desirable to the person, the theodic problem does not exist.
- The reincarnation theodicy believes that people suffer evil because of their wrongdoing in a previous life.
- The contrast theodicy holds that evil is needed to enable people to appreciate or understand good.
- The warning theodicy rationalizes evil as God's warning to people to mend their ways.

A defense has been proposed by the American philosopher Alvin Plantinga, which is focused on showing the logical possibility of God's existence. Plantinga's version of the free-will defense argued that the coexistence of God and evil is not logically impossible and that free will further explains the existence of evil without contradicting the existence of God.

== Islam ==
Theodicy is discussed in Islamic theology across various schools, including the three Sunni schools—Ashʿarism, Maturidism, and Atharism—as well as the Muʿtazilite school.

=== Ashʿarism ===
Most Sunni theologians analyze theodicy from an anti-realist metaethical standpoint. Ash'ari theologians argue that ordinary moral judgments stem from emotion and social convention, which are inadequate to either condemn or justify divine actions. Ash'arites hold that God creates everything, including human actions, but they distinguish creation (khalq) from acquisition (kasb) of actions. Ash'arites allow individuals the latter ability, though they do not posit the existence of free will in a fuller sense of the term. In the words of Al-Shahrastani (1086–1153):

God creates, in man, the power, ability, choice, and will to perform an act, and man, endowed with this derived power, chooses freely one of the alternatives and intends or wills to do the action, and, corresponding to this intention, God creates and completes the action.

Ash'ari theology insists on ultimate divine transcendence; moreover, it teaches that human knowledge regarding this transcendence is limited to what has been revealed through the prophets, so that on the question of God's creation of evil, revelation must be accepted bila kayfa (without asking how).

=== Maturidism ===
In contrast to Ash'arism, Maturidism adheres to moral realism—the human mind is able to grasp good and evil independently from revelation—yet disagrees with the Mu'tazilite assertion that God's wisdom entails creating only what is good. Good and evil, though real, are considered to be created by God; thus God is not subject to good and evil, and humans merely learn whatever God created. Blaming God for a violation of right and wrong is thus considered unmerited, since God created right and wrong originally.

Whatever is considered evil by humans would ultimately be good. A distinction exists between those who follow tawhid (or monotheism) and those who reject it. Maturidi cites Surah Al Imran, verse 178, to indicate that God does not regard believers and unbelievers as equal; God would increase the sin of the sinners (and guide the believers).

According to the Maturidite school of thought, ontological evil serves a greater purpose and is in essence secretly good. God's wisdom is not considered to focus on choosing between good and evil; rather, it is concerned with putting things in their proper place. The existence of evil as distinct from good (or opposing good) is rejected throughout sources from Maturidite thinkers. Maturidi himself criticizes believing in the opposition of good and evil as a remnant of Persian dualistic religions. Rumi likewise said in his refutation of Ahriman (the principle of evil) that "good cannot exist without evil" and "there is no separation between them".

=== Atharism ===
The Hanbali legal scholar Ibn Taymiyya, whose writings became influential in Wahhabism, argued as follows: while God creates human acts, humans are responsible for their deeds as the agents of their acts. Ibn Taymiyya held that divine creation is good from a causal standpoint, since God creates all things for wise purposes. Thus, apparent evil is actually good in view of its purpose, and pure evil does not exist. This analysis was developed further with practical illustrations by Ibn al-Qayyim, a scholar, jurist, and theologian.

=== Mu'tazilism ===
Mu'tazila theologians approached the problem of theodicy within a framework of moral realism, according to which the moral value of acts is accessible to unaided reason, so that humans can make moral judgments about divine acts. These theologians argued that the divine act of creation is good despite the existence of suffering, because it allows humans the compensation of a greater reward in the afterlife. The theologians posited that individuals have free will to commit evil, and they absolved God of responsibility for such acts. God's justice thus consists of punishing wrongdoers. Following the demise of Mu'tazila as a school, its theodicy was adopted in the Zaydi and Twelver branches of Shia Islam.

Ibn Sina, the most influential Muslim philosopher, analyzed theodicy from a purely ontological, neoplatonic standpoint; he aimed to prove that God, as the absolutely good First Cause, created a good world. Ibn Sina argued that evil refers to either to a cause affecting an entity (such as being burned in a fire), in which case evil is a quality of another entity, or to an entity's imperfection (such as blindness), in which case evil does not exist as an entity. According to Ibn Sina, such qualities are necessary attributes of the best possible order of things, so that the good they serve is greater than the harm they cause.

Philosophical Sufi theologians such as Ibn Arabi were influenced by the neoplatonic theodicy of Ibn Sina. The scholar Al-Ghazali anticipated the optimistic theodicy of Leibniz in his dictum "There is nothing in possibility more wonderful than what is". The theologian and philosopher Fakhr al-Din al-Razi, who represented the mainstream Sunni view, challenged Ibn Sina's analysis and argued that it merely sidesteps the real problem of evil, which is rooted in the human experience of suffering in a world that contains more pain than pleasure.

== Alternatives ==
=== Jewish anti-theodicy ===
In 1998, the Jewish theologian Zachary Braiterman coined the term anti-theodicy in his book (God) After Auschwitz; the term was used to describe Jews, in both a biblical and a post-Holocaust context, whose response to the problem of evil is protest and a refusal to investigate the relationship between God and suffering. An anti-theodicy acts in opposition to a theodicy and places full blame for all experience of evil onto God, but it must rise from an individual's belief in and love of God. Anti-theodicy has been likened to Job's protests in the Book of Job. Braiterman wrote that an anti-theodicy rejects the idea that there is a meaningful relationship between God and evil, or that God could be justified for the experience of evil.

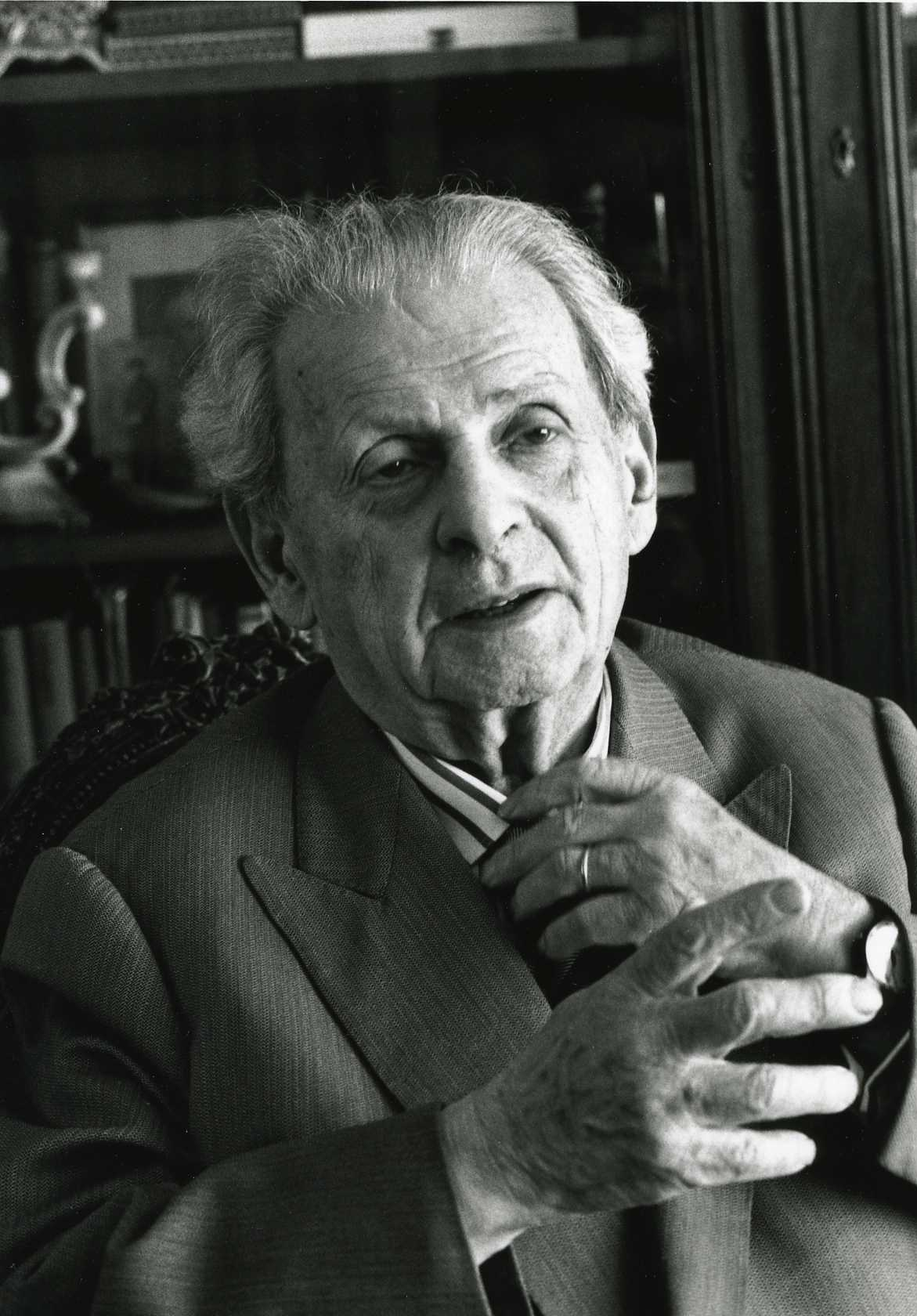
Emmanuel Levinas, a French Jewish philosopher

The Holocaust prompted a reconsideration of theodicy in some Jewish circles. The French Jewish philosopher Emmanuel Levinas, who had been a prisoner of war in Nazi Germany, declared theodicy to be "blasphemous", arguing that it is the "source of all immorality"; he demanded that the project of theodicy be ended. Levinas asked whether the idea of absolutism survived after the Holocaust—he proposed that it did. He argued that humans are not called to justify God in the face of evil, but to attempt to live godly lives; rather than considering whether God was present during the Holocaust, the duty of humans is to build a world where goodness will prevail.

The scholar David R. Blumenthal, in his book Facing the Abusing God, supports the "theology of protest", which he saw as presented in Elie Wiesel's play The Trial of God (1979). Blumenthal supports the view that survivors of the Holocaust cannot forgive God and so must protest about it. Blumenthal believes that a similar theology is presented in the Book of Job, in which Job does not question God's existence or power, but instead his morality and justice. Other prominent voices in the Jewish tradition include the Nobel Prize-winning author Elie Wiesel (mentioned above) and Richard L. Rubinstein (especially in his book The Cunning of History).

Menachem Mendel Schneerson, the seventh Rebbe of Chabad Lubavitch (a Hasidic Jewish dynasty), sought to elucidate how faith (or trust, emunah) in God defines the full, transcendental preconditions of anti-theodicy. Rabbi Schneerson endorsed the attitude of "holy protest" found in the stories of Job and Jeremiah, as well as those of Abraham (Genesis 18) and Moses (Exodus 33); he argued that a phenomenology of protest, when carried to its logical limits, reveals a profound conviction in cosmic justice—as first exemplified in Abraham's question: "Will the Judge of the whole earth not do justice?" (Genesis 18:25). Recalling Kant's 1791 essay on the failure of all theoretical attempts at theodicy, Rabbi Schneerson identifies a viable practical theodicy with messianism. His faithful anti-theodicy is worked out in a long letter, dated 26 April 1965, to Elie Wiesel.

Hannah Arendt offers notable resistance to this trend of anti-theodicy in her works The Origins of Totalitarianism and—more sensationally—in her reporting on the 1961 trial of Adolf Eichmann, which was collected in her book Eichmann in Jerusalem. Without resorting to transcendental authority, purely by observation, Arendt arrives at a conclusion similar to Augustine's theodicy: She ascribes Adolf Eichmann's evil actions to a lack of empathic imagination and to the thoughtlessness of his conformity to norms of careerism within the Third Reich. She finds a thoughtlessness or total absence of consideration for other perspectives at the center of his behavior. The quality of this lack she describes as "the banality of evil". Arendt did not intend to propose "the banality of evil" as a technical term or fixed denomination by which to describe the void of empathic imagination that she observed—it simply happened to be a phrase in her description that was appropriated by the reviewing press and by other scholarly responsa. Banality is only a facet or particular quality of her vantage point in looking into this emptiness.

=== Christian alternatives to theodicy ===
A number of Christian writers oppose theodicies. The theologian J. Todd Billings deems constructing theodicies to be a "destructive practice". In the same vein, the philosopher Nick Trakakis observes that "theodical discourse can only add to the world's evils, not remove or illuminate them". As an alternative to theodicy, some theologians have advocated "reflection on tragedy" as a more appropriate reply to evil. For example, Wendy Farley believes that "a desire for justice" and "anger and pity at suffering" should replace "theodicy's cool justifications of evil". Sarah K. Pinnock opposes abstract theodicies that would legitimize evil and suffering. However, she endorses discussions of theodicy in which people ponder God, evil, and suffering from a perspective of practical faith.

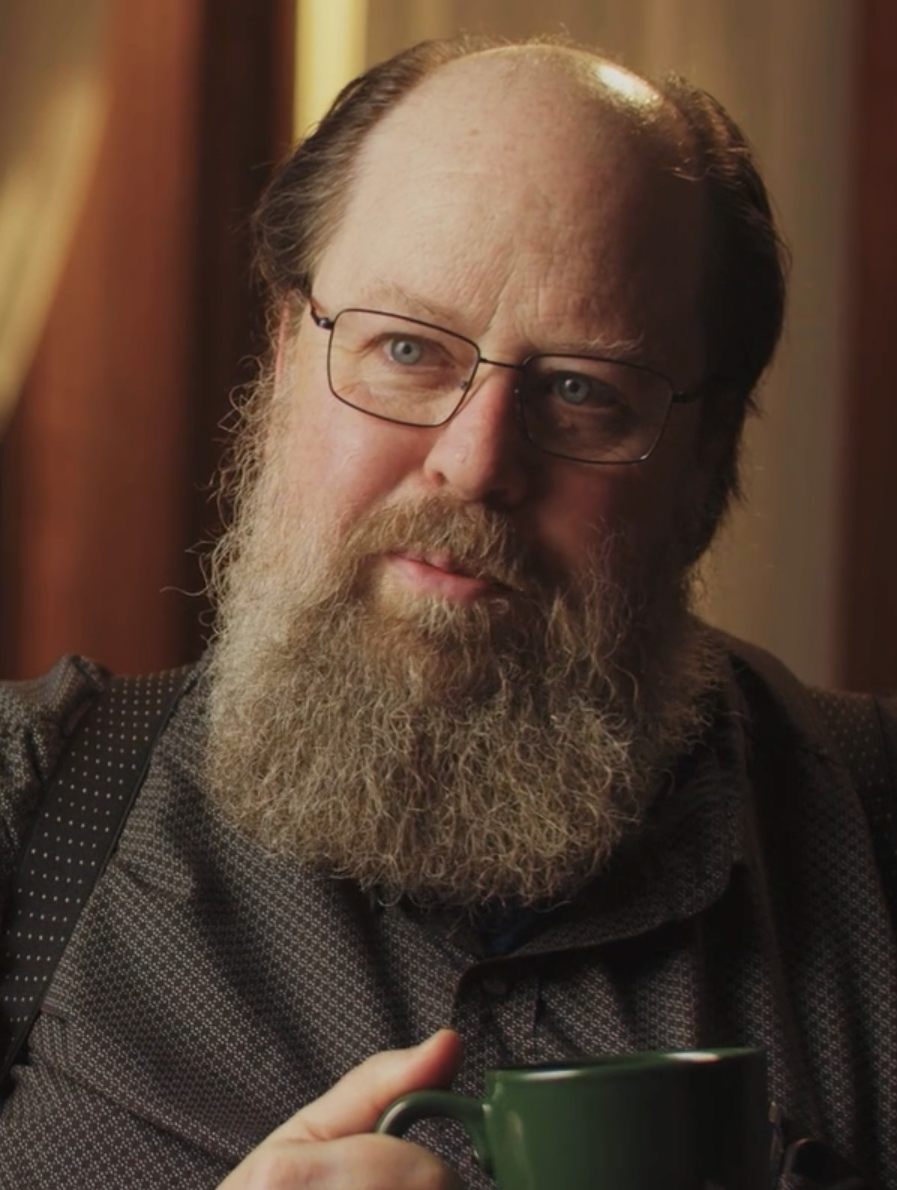
David Bentley Hart, an American philosopher and theologian

In an essay for The Hedgehog Review, the scholar Eugene McCarraher called David Bentley Hart's 2005 book The Doors of the Sea "a ferocious attack on theodicy in the wake of the previous year's tsunami", in reference to the 2004 tsunami in the Indian Ocean. As Hart states on page 58 of the book: "The principal task of theodicy is to explain why paradise is not a logical possibility." Hart's unwillingness to concede that theodicy has any positive capacity to explain the purpose of evil is consistent with many Greek church fathers. For example, in his book Theophany: The Neoplatonic Philosophy of Dionysius the Areopagite, the philosopher Eric D. Perl writes as follows:

Dionysius' ...refusal to assign a cause to evil, then, marks not the failure but the success of his treatment of the problem. To explain evil, to attribute a cause to it, would necessarily be to explain it away, to deny that evil is genuinely evil at all. For to explain something is to show how it is in some way good. ...Only by not explaining evil, by insisting rather on its radical causelessness, its unintelligibility, can we take evil seriously as evil. This is why most "theodicies" fail precisely insofar as they succeed. To the extent that they satisfactorily account for or make sense of evil, they tacitly or expressly deny that it is evil and show that it is in fact good. Dionysius' treatment of evil, on the other hand, succeeds by failing, recognizing that the sheer negativity that is evil must be uncaused and hence inexplicable, for otherwise it would not be negativity and would not be evil. It has been wisely remarked that any satisfactory account of evil must enable us to retain our outrage at it. Most theodicies fail this test, for in supposedly allowing us to understand evil they justify it and thus take away our outrage. For Dionysius, however, evil remains outrageous precisely because it is irrational, because there is no reason, no justification for it. The privation theory of evil, expressed in a radical form by Dionysius, is not a shallow disregard or denial of the evident evils in the world. It means rather that, confronted with the evils in the world, we can only say that for no reason, and therefore outrageously, the world as we find it does not perfectly love God, the Good, the sole end of all love. And since the Good is the principle of intelligibility and hence of being, to the extent that anything fails to partake of that principle it is deficient in being. The recognition of evils in the world and in ourselves is the recognition that the world and ourselves, as we find them, are less than fully existent because we do not perfectly love God, the Good.

The theologian Karl Barth viewed the evil of human suffering as being ultimately under the "control of divine providence". Given this view, Barth deemed it impossible for humans to devise a theodicy that establishes "the idea of the goodness of God". For Barth, only the crucifixion could establish the goodness of God. In the crucifixion, God bears and suffers what humanity suffers. This suffering by God Himself makes human theodicies anticlimactic. Barth found a "twofold justification" in the crucifixion: the justification of sinful humanity and "the justification in which God justifies Himself".

The Christian Science religious movement offers a solution to the problem by denying that evil ultimately exists. Mary Baker Eddy (the founder of Christian science) and Mark Twain had contrasting views on theodicy and suffering, which are well-described by the historian Stephen Gottschalk.

Redemptive suffering, based in Pope John Paul II's theology of the body, embraces suffering as having value in and of itself. In her book Wandering in Darkness, the philosopher Eleonore Stump uses psychology, narrative, and exegesis to demonstrate that redemptive suffering, as found in Thomistic theodicy, can constitute a consistent and cogent defense for the problem of suffering.

=== Free-will defense ===
As an alternative to a theodicy, a defense may be offered as a response to the problem of evil. A defense attempts to show that God's existence is not made logically impossible by the existence of evil; God's existence does not need to be true or plausible, merely logically possible. The American philosopher Alvin Plantinga offers a free-will defense: in this argument, he claims that human free will sufficiently explains the existence of evil; at the same time, he maintains that God's existence remains logically possible.

Plantinga argues that, if God's existence and the existence of evil are to be logically inconsistent, a premise must be provided which, if true, would make them inconsistent; since none has been provided, the existence of God and evil must be consistent. Free will furthers this argument by providing a premise which, in conjunction with the existence of evil, entails that God's existence remains consistent. Opponents have argued that this defense is discredited by the existence of evil not related to humans—such as droughts, tsunamis, and malaria.

In his book, Evil, Sin and Christian Theism (2022), the theologian Andrew Loke develops a "big picture" free-will defense, arguing that God's justification for allowing suffering is not based primarily on an argument from future benefits, but instead on the nature of love which involves "allowing humans to exercise their free will in morally significant ways". Loke employs an approach in which "Christian theism provides the big picture and uses a combination of theodicies" in defense of a moderate version of skeptical theism.

This big-picture approach, according to him, helps to put the problem of evil and suffering in a larger perspective that answers the major questions inherent in a worldview. Such questions include the following: "What is the greatest good? What is the meaning of life? Where do I come from? Where am I going?" Loke argues that Christian theism provides the most comprehensive and consistent answers to these questions: "the greatest good is to have a right relationship with God, the source of all good. The meaning of life...is to live our lives for the greatest good;...to glorify God and enjoy him..." In Loke's view, the bigger picture of a just, all-powerful, and loving God who will ultimately defeat evil serves as the backdrop against which all temporal suffering can obtain a meaningful understanding.

=== Cosmodicy and anthropodicy ===
A cosmodicy attempts to justify the fundamental goodness of the universe in the face of evil, and an anthropodicy attempts to justify the fundamental goodness of human nature in the face of the evils produced by humans.

Considering the relationship between theodicy and cosmodicy, the theologian Johannes van der Ven argued that the choice between theodicy and cosmodicy is a false dilemma. The theologian Philip E. Devenish proposed what he described as "a nuanced view in which theodicy and cosmodicy are rendered complementary, rather than alternative concepts". The theologian J. Matthew Ashley described the relationship between theodicy, cosmodicy and anthropodicy as follows:

In classical terms, this is to broach the problem of theodicy: how to think about God in the face of the presence of suffering in God's creation. After God's dethronement as the subject of history, the question rebounds to the new subject of history: the human being. As a consequence, theodicy becomes anthropodicy—justifications of our faith in humanity as the subject of history, in the face of the suffering that is so inextricably woven into the history that humanity makes.

==== Essential kenosis ====
Essential kenosis is a form of process theology (related to "open theism") that allows a person to affirm that God is almighty, while simultaneously affirming that God cannot prevent genuine evil. In this view, because God—out of love—necessarily gives freedom, agency, self-organization, natural processes, and law-like regularities to creation, God cannot override, withdraw, or fail to provide such capacities. Consequently, God is not culpable for failing to prevent genuine evil. The work of the philosopher Thomas Jay Oord explains this view fully.

The theologian Gijsbert van den Brink effectively refutes any view that holds that God has restricted his power because of his love, saying that it creates a "metaphysical dualism"; moreover, it would not alleviate God's responsibility for evil, because God could have prevented evil by not restricting himself. Van den Brink then elaborates an explanation of power and love from a Trinitarian perspective which equates these two qualities; he also explains what he calls "the power of love" as representative of God's involvement in the struggle against evil.

== See also ==
- Augustinian theodicy
- Dystheism
- Global justice
- Irenaean theodicy
- Misotheism
- Problem of hell
- Theodicy and the Bible
- Theodicy in Hinduism
- Utilitarianism
