= Privation =

Psychological concept of deprivation

In child psychology, privation is the absence or lack of basic necessities. Privation occurs when a child has no opportunity to form a relationship with a parent figure, or when such relationship is distorted, due to their treatment. It is different to deprivation, which occurs when an established relationship is severed. It is understood that privation can produce social, emotional and intellectual problems for children; however, how inevitable such problems become as a result of privation, and the extent to which they can be reversed, remains an issue of debate among psychologists.
