= Omnibenevolence =

Property of possessing maximal goodness

Omnibenevolence is the property of possessing maximal goodness. Some philosophers, such as Epicurus, (Note: The earliest statement of the problem of evil is attributed to Epicurus, but this attribution is uncertain.) have argued that it is impossible, or at least improbable, for a deity to exhibit such a property alongside omniscience and omnipotence, as a result of the problem of evil. However, some philosophers, such as Alvin Plantinga, argue the plausibility of co-existence.

== Etymology ==
The word omnibenevolence derives from the Latin prefix omni-, meaning "all", and the words bene and volens, meaning "good" and "will", respectively. Thus the term means "all good will".

== Usage ==
The term is patterned on, and often accompanied by, the terms omniscience and omnipotence, typically to refer to conceptions of an "all-good, all-knowing, all-powerful" deity. Philosophers and theologians more commonly use phrases like "perfectly good", or simply the term "benevolence". The word "omnibenevolence" may be interpreted to mean perfectly just, all-loving, fully merciful, or any number of other qualities, depending on precisely how "good" is understood. As such, there is little agreement over how an "omnibenevolent" being would behave.

The earliest record for its use in English, according to the Oxford English Dictionary, is in 1679. The Catholic Church does not appear to use the term "omnibenevolent" in the liturgy or Catechism. Saint Thomas Aquinas in particular explained in Summa Theologica that God may indirectly want evil in the physical world, when this is necessary for the greater good of the order of the universe.

Modern users of the term include George H. Smith in his book Atheism: The Case Against God (1980), where he argued that divine qualities are inconsistent. However, the term is also used by authors who defend the coherence of divine attributes, including but not limited to, Jonathan Kvanvig in The Problem of Hell (1993), and Joshua Hoffman and Gary Rosenkrantz in The Divine Attributes (2002).

The terminology has been used by some prominent Roman Catholic figures, examples being Bishop Robert Barron, Doctor of Sacred Theology in his 2011 book Catholicism: A Journey to the Heart of the Faith.

== Philosophical perspectives ==
The notion of an omnibenevolent, infinitely compassionate deity has raised certain atheistic objections, such as the problem of evil and the problem of Hell. Responses to such problems are called theodicies and can be general, arguing for the coherence of the divine, such as Swinburne's Providence and the Problem of Evil, or they can address a specific problem, such as Charles Seymour's A Theodicy of Hell.

Proponents of pandeism contend that benevolence (much less omnibenevolence) is simply not required to account for any property of our Universe, as a morally neutral deity which was powerful enough to have created our Universe as we experience it would be, by definition, able to have created our Universe as we experience it. William C. Lane contended that pandeism thereby offered an escape from the evidential argument from evil: In 2010, author William C. Lane contended that:

In pandeism, God is no superintending, heavenly power, capable of hourly intervention into earthly affairs. No longer existing "above," God cannot intervene from above and cannot be blamed for failing to do so. Instead God bears all suffering, whether the fawn's or anyone else's. Even so, a skeptic might ask, "Why must there be so much suffering,? Why could not the world's design omit or modify the events that cause it?" In pandeism, the reason is clear: to remain unified, a world must convey information through transactions. Reliable conveyance requires relatively simple, uniform laws. Laws designed to skip around suffering-causing events or to alter their natural consequences (i.e., their consequences under simple laws) would need to be vastly complicated or (equivalently) to contain numerous exceptions.

== Religious perspectives ==
The theological justification stems from God's aseity: the non-contingent, independent and self-sustained mode of existence that theologians ascribe to God. For if he was not morally perfect, that is, if God was merely a great being but nevertheless of finite benevolence, then his existence would involve an element of contingency, because one could always conceive of a being of greater benevolence. Hence, omnibenevolence is a requisite of perfect being theology.

Theologians in the Wesleyan tradition (see Thomas Jay Oord) argue that omnibenevolence is God's primary attribute. Some Hyper-Calvinist interpretations reject omnibenevolence. For example, the Westboro Baptist Church is infamous for its expression of this stance.

Christian apologist William Lane Craig argues that Islam does not hold to the idea of omnibenevolence.

== See also ==
- Benevolence (disambiguation)
- Christian universalism
- Dystheism
- Good and evil
- Light and darkness
- Love of Christ
- Love of God
- Misotheism
- Omnipresence
