= Alan White (American philosopher) =

American philosopher

- Born: Alan Edmunds White; 1951 (age 74–75)

Education
- Education: Pennsylvania State University (PhD, 1980)
- Thesis: The End of Philosophy: A Study of Hegel and Schelling (1980)
- Doctoral advisor: Stanley Rosen; Thomas Seebohm

Philosophical work
- Era: Contemporary philosophy
- Region: Western philosophy
- School: Continental philosophy Analytic philosophy Structural-systematic philosophy
- Institutions: Williams College
- Main interests: Metaphysics
- Notable ideas: Philosophical theory of everything
- Website: https://sites.williams.edu/awhite/

Alan Edmunds White (born 1951) is an American philosopher and Mark Hopkins Professor of Philosophy at Williams College. He was a president of the Metaphysical Society of America (2014).

== Education and career ==
Alan White received his B.A. from Tulane University in 1972, followed by a M.A. and Ph.D. from Pennsylvania State University in 1976 and 1980 respectively under the direction of Stanley H. Rosen and Thomas Seebohm. He then took up visiting professor positions at Davidson College and East Tennessee State University before joining the faculty of The New School for Social Research in 1982 as assistant professor of philosophy. In 1986, White moved to Williams College, holding the position of assistant professor of philosophy. White was promoted to associate professor in 1990, full professor in 1993, and was granted an endowed professorship in 2000, becoming the Mark Hopkins Professor of Philosophy. In 2014, White served a one-year term as president of the Metaphysical Society of America.

== Books ==
- Absolute Knowledge: Hegel and the Problem of Metaphysics. Series in Continental Thought, Vol. 4. Ohio University Press, 1983.
- Schelling: An Introduction to the System of Freedom. Yale University Press, 1983.
- Within Nietzsche’s Labyrinth. Routledge, 1990.
- G. W. F. Hegel. The Philosophy of Right. Translator and Editor. Focus Publishing, 2002.
- Structure and Being. A Theoretical Framework for a Systematic Philosophy. Lorenz B. Puntel (Munich). Translated by and in collaboration with Alan White. Penn State University Press, 2008.
- Being and God. A Systematic Approach in Confrontation with Heidegger, Levinas, and Marion. Lorenz B. Puntel (Munich). Translated by and in collaboration with Alan White. Northwestern UP, 2011.
- Nothing Matters. A Philosophical Romance. A novel self-published in Kindle format, 2011.
- Revenge. A novel self-published in Kindle format, 2011.
- Toward a Philosophical Theory of Everything. Contributions to the Structural-Systematic Philosophy. Bloomsbury (formerly Continuum), 2014.
- Being and Nothing. Lorenz B. Puntel (Munich). Translated by Alan White. Forthcoming from Bloomsbury.
