= Seebohm =

Seebohm may refer to:

- Emily Seebohm (born 1992), Australian swimmer
- Frederic Seebohm, Baron Seebohm (1909–1990), British banker, soldier and social work innovator
- Frederic Seebohm (historian) (1833–1912), British economic historian
- Hans-Christoph Seebohm (1903–1967), German politician
- Henry Seebohm (1832–1895), English steel manufacturer, amateur ornithologist and traveller
- John Seebohm (born 1960), former Australian rules footballer
- Shannon Seebohm (born 1988), Australian basketball coach
- Thomas Seebohm (1934–2014), phenomenological philosopher

== See also ==
- Seebohm Rowntree (1871–1954), British sociological researcher
