= Evolutionary theodicy =

Natural selection as necessary evil

Evolutionary theodicies are responses to the question of animal suffering as an aspect of the problem of evil. These theodicies assert that a universe which contains the beauty and complexity this one does could only come about by the natural processes of evolution. If evolution is the only way this world could have been created, then the goodness of creation is intrinsically linked to the pain and evil of the evolutionary processes.

The problem of animal suffering is presented in the form of a logical syllogism or an evidential argument. These theodicies include basic presumptions that evil cannot be defined simply as pain, that the assumed characteristics of the Divine are limited, and that the theory of evolution is factual. Evolutionary theodicists, such as Christopher Southgate, often assert that God cares for, and suffers along with, all suffering creatures.

Opponents of evolutionary theodicies may object to i) implied constraints on God's power ii) God's involvement in processes necessarily involving violence and suffering iii) the use of eschatology as part of a theodicy.

== Background definitions ==
=== Problem of evil ===
The problem of evil is concerned with how it is possible to reconcile the existence of evil and suffering, with an all-knowing, all-powerful and good God. David Hume summarizes one of the first versions of the argument: "Is God willing to prevent evil, but not able? Then he is not omnipotent. Is he able, but not willing? Then he is malevolent. Is he both able and willing? Then from whence comes evil?"

The argument comes in two forms: the evidential argument is about how much the existence of evil may or may not provide evidence against the possible existence of God. The logical argument has "the more ambitious aim of showing that, in a world in which there is evil, it is logically impossible—not just unlikely—that God exists".

=== Natural evil and animal suffering ===
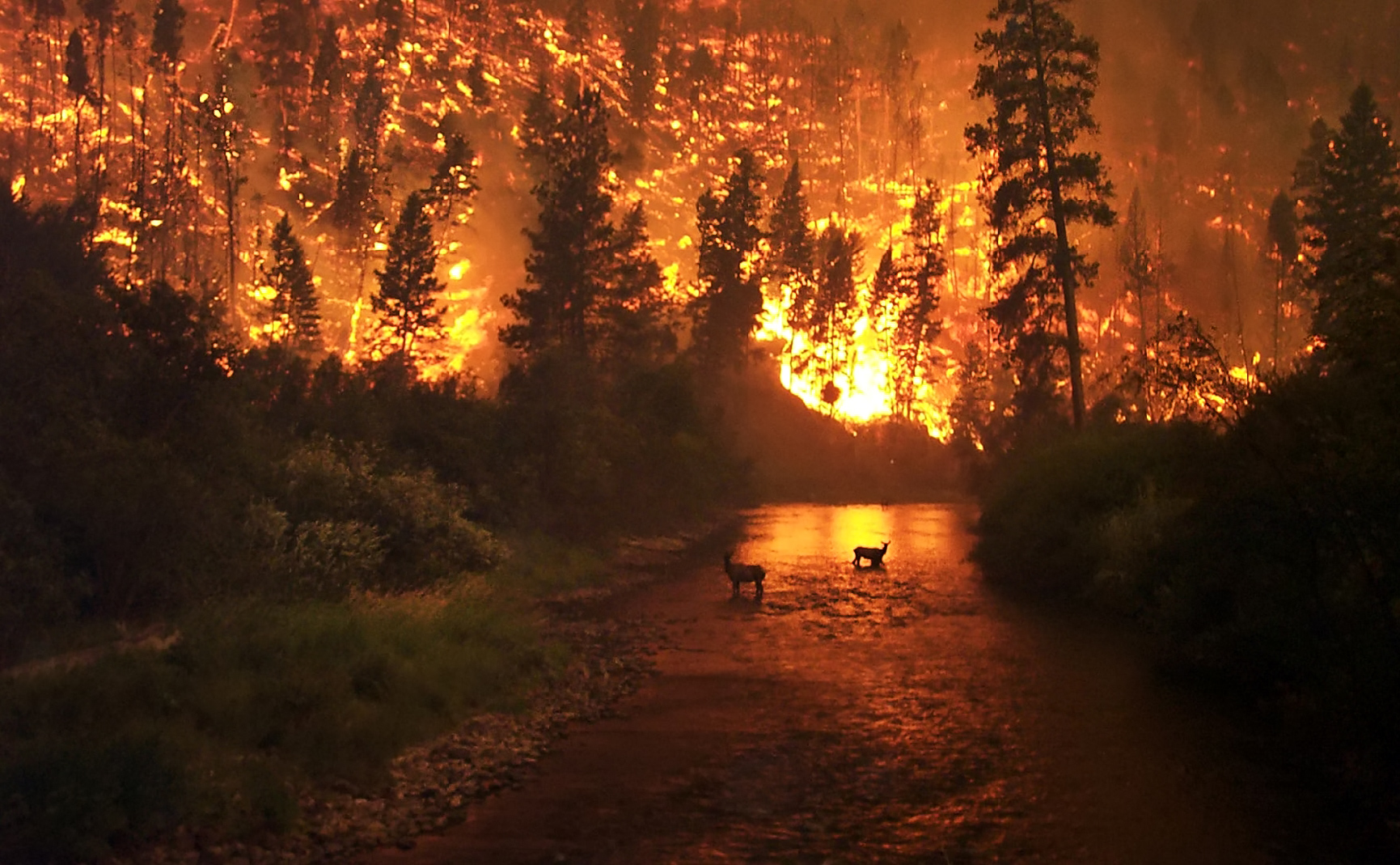
William L. Rowe's example of natural evil: "In some distant forest lightning strikes a dead tree, resulting in a forest fire. In the fire a fawn is trapped, horribly burned, and lies in terrible agony for several days before death relieves its suffering."

One version of the problem of evil includes animal suffering from natural evil such as violence from predators, natural disasters, and evolution. Philosophical theologian Bethany N. Sollereder explains that, "For the theologian, two major problems exist when faced with non-human suffering in evolutionary process". First, free will and soul-making theodicies may work for humans but do not apply to animals. Second, creation through evolution as God's chosen method is difficult to understand and reconcile with a God of love, since competition and death are evolution's key components.

Scholar Michael Almeida says that animal suffering is "perhaps the most serious and difficult" version of the problem of evil. It can be stated as:

1. God is omnipotent, omniscient and wholly good.
2. The evil of extensive animal suffering exists.
3. Necessarily, God can actualize an evolutionary perfect world.
4. Necessarily, God can actualize an evolutionary perfect world only if God does actualize an evolutionary perfect world.
5. Necessarily, God actualized an evolutionary perfect world. (Note: Nicola Creegan has presented the logical and evidential versions of the problem of evil when applied to animal suffering.)

=== Theodicies and defenses ===
Generally, a defense is an attempt to show there is no logical incompatibility between the existence of evil and the existence of God. The argument need not be true, or even probable, it need only be possible to be sufficient to invalidate the claim of logical impossibility.

A theodicy, on the other hand, is more ambitious, since it attempts to provide a plausible justification – a morally or philosophically sufficient reason – for the existence of evil, and thereby weaken the evidential argument.

=== Evil ===
A broad concept of evil defines it as any and all pain and suffering, yet according to Marcus Singer, a usable definition of evil must be based on the knowledge that: "If something is really evil, it can't be necessary, and if it is really necessary, it can't be evil". According to the National Institute of medicine, pain is essential for survival: "Without pain, the world would be an impossibly dangerous place". Therefore John Kemp concludes that evil cannot be correctly understood on "a simple hedonic scale on which pleasure appears as a plus, and pain as a minus".

The narrow concept of evil involves moral condemnation, and is applicable only to moral agents capable of making independent decisions, and their actions. University of Manchester philosopher Eve Garrard suggests that evil does not describe ordinary wrongdoing, and that "there is a qualitative and not merely a quantitative difference between evil acts and other wrongful ones; evil acts are not just very bad or wrongful acts, but rather ones possessing some specially horrific quality". Calder argues that evil must involve the attempt or desire to inflict significant harm on the victim without moral justification.

=== Omniscience, omnibenevolence and omnipotence ===
According to professor of Religion and of Philosophy at the University of Rochester, Edward Wierenga,, omniscience is defined as "maximal knowledge". Wierenga adds that "maximal" does not mean unlimited. Maximal is limited to God knowing all that is knowable. Within this view, future events that depend upon choices made by individuals with freewill are unknowable until they occur. This is the most widely accepted view of omniscience among scholars of the twenty-first century. William Hasker calls it freewill theism.

Omnipotence is maximal power to bring about events within the limits of possibility, but again, this quality is limited. According to Hoffman and Rosenkrantz: "An omnipotent agent is not required to bring about an impossible state of affairs... Maximal power has logical and temporal limitations, including the limitation that an omnipotent agent cannot bring about, i.e., cause, another agent's free decision": a deity's power is limited by the power of humans with freewill.

Omnibenevolence sees God as all loving. If God is omnibenevolent, He acts according to what is "Best", but if there is no "Best" available, God attempts, if possible, to bring about states of affairs that are creatable and optimal within the limitations of physical reality.

=== Evolution ===
Darwin observed that variations in biological forms are always rising in response to changing environmental conditions, the scarcity of resources, and the need to reproduce. Those best adapted outcompete the less well adapted who tend to have a shorter life, fewer descendants and eventually disappear from the overall population. This natural selection includes predator-prey cycles, making pain and violence characteristic of nature.

Philosopher and theologian Nicola Hoggard Creegan writes that all biologists accept these facts, but also points to questions that have existed for the last 150 years concerning the mechanisms of evolution. Many of these questions persist and have led to refinements and additions to Darwin's original proposals. As Simon Conway Morris states: "evolution may be a fact... but it is in need of continuous interpretation".

For example, Jean-Baptiste Lamarck was a French naturalist who said the changes an organism makes as it adapts to its environment can be passed down to subsequent generations through gene expression (which genes get turned off). This has been taken up by the new field of epigenetics. The mutation theory of evolution was proposed by a Dutch botanist, Hugo de Vries, one of the first geneticists. He asserted that evolution is a discontinuous and jerky process in which there is a jump from one species to another, (rather than a gradual incline as Darwin suggested), so that new species arise as mutations from pre-existing species in a single generation (macrogenesis or saltation).

Lamarckism, Darwinism and Mutation theory show that no single theory has been fully satisfactory for explaining all aspects of evolution. Neo-Darwinism, or the "Synthetic theory of evolution", is the modern version that reconciles Darwin's and de Vries' theories concerning genetics. This is now also being modified. The sense that symbiosis and cooperation are also rules "of evolution alongside natural selection and competition, is growing". Evolution as "shaped" by the laws of physics and chemistry and mathematics; recurrent patterns; evolutionary constraints; and convergence along with Evolutionary developmental biology (called evo devo) demonstrate emerging varieties of evolution. John Haught "has urged that... evolution can be seen in this multi-layered way". This layered view allows for creative and coherent theodicies that reach beyond the limits of random mutation and natural selection alone.

== The only way theodicy ==
=== Goodness and groaning ===
In response to the problem of evil concerning natural evil and animal suffering, Christopher Southgate, a trained research biochemist and Professor of Christian Theodicy at the University of Exeter, has developed a "compound evolutionary theodicy." Robert John Russell summarizes it as beginning with an assertion of the goodness of creation and all sentient creatures. To this description of the world as good, Southgate adds the struggle inherent in evolution using Romans 8:22 which says "the whole creation has been groaning (in travail) as in the pains of childbirth" since its beginning. Denis O. Lamoureux calls this theory of the goodness of creation, with life on earth also experiencing travail at the same time, the central thesis of Southgate's theodicy.

In developing his theodicy, Southgate distinguishes three methods of analyzing good and harm:

- property consequence: the consequence of the existence of good includes the possibility of the same property causing harm (i.e., freewill)
- developmental: the good is a goal that can only develop through a process that includes harm (i.e., soul making)
- constitutive: the existence of good is inherently and constitutively inseparable from the experience of harm or suffering. (i. e., evolution)

Southgate uses all three methods to argue that, the goodness of creation is intrinsically linked to the evils of the evolutionary processes by which such goodness is achieved. The same properties of the process which produce the good also produce the pain and suffering; the good can only be developed through that process; and the good is constitutively inseparable from the struggle. In this scenario, natural evils are an inevitable side-effect of developing life.

According to Russell and Southgate, even though Darwinian evolution does include animal suffering, it was the only way God could create the goodness of the world. "A universe with the sort of beauty, diversity, sentience and sophistication of creatures that the biosphere now contains" could only come about by the natural processes of evolution. Michael Ruse is quoted as pointing out that Richard Dawkins has made the same claim concerning evolution.

Dawkins ...argues strenuously that selection and only selection can [produce complexity]. No one—and presumably this includes God—could have gotten adaptive complexity without going the route of natural selection... The Christian positively welcomes Dawkins's understanding of Darwinism. Physical evil exists, and Darwinism explains why God had no choice but to allow it to occur. He wanted to produce design like effects (including humankind) and natural selection is the only option open.

Holmes Rolston explains that, without predation, (a principal cause of suffering), many animal characteristics would never have developed: "the cougar's fang has carved the limbs of the fleet-footed deer". He asserts that "The animal skills demanded [in a non-predatory world] would only be a fraction of those that have resulted in actual zoology—no horns, no fleet-footed predator or prey, no fine-tuned eyesight and hearing, no quick neural capacity, no advanced brains..." would have developed without the pressure of natural selection.

Patricia Williams writes that: "When stars burn, explode and die, the heavy elements are born and distributed, feeding life. When the first living organisms die, they make room for more complex ones and begin the process of natural selection. When organisms die, new life feeds on them... the sources of [natural] evil lie in attributes so valuable that we would not even consider eliminating them in order to eradicate evil". Rolston summarizes this by saying that, within this process, there is none of the waste Darwin lamented for life itself "is forever conserved, regenerated, redeemed".

Russell goes on to say that the physical laws that undergird biological development, such as thermodynamics, also contribute to goodness and groaning. "Gravity, geology, and the specific orbit of the moon lead to the tidal patterns of the Earth's oceans and thus to both the environment in which early life evolved and in which tsunamis bring death and destruction to countless thousands of people".

=== Cruciform nature ===
Southgate and Rolston assert a "need to evoke the image of the Cross to do justice to nature's travail". Holmes Rolston III explains that the suffering inherent in evolution, where life is constantly struggling through its pain and suffering toward something higher, embodies 'redemptive suffering' as exemplified by Jesus. "The capacity to suffer through to joy is a supreme emergent and an essence of Christianity... The whole evolutionary upslope is a lesser calling of this kind". Southgate says God suffers along with "every sentient being in creation" as part of its cruciform nature.

In his evolutionary theodicy, Evil and Evolution: A Theodicy (1984), Richard Kropf supposes that "what we take for evil in the natural course of events, exists primarily because creation as an evolutionary process necessarily begins with forms of existence that are totally unlike God". Bethany N. Sollereder acknowledges that violence and suffering are inherent in the evolutionary process, yet asserts this is given context and redemption in light of the "creative suffering of God".

=== Eschatological argument ===
Southgate's theodicy rejects any 'means to an end' argument that says the evolution of any species justifies the suffering and extinction of any prior species that led to it. According to Southgate, "No creature should be regarded as an evolutionary expedient". He goes on to affirm that "all creatures which have died, without their full potential having been realized, must be given fulfillment elsewhere". Russell asserts that the only satisfactory understanding of that "elsewhere" is the eschatological hope that the present creation will be transformed by God into the New Creation, with its new heaven and new earth.

Sollereder sums up this view: "Redemption, for all animals, is not just freedom from suffering, but the embrace of a new capacity for union with God. The individual fully enjoys God, both knowing and being completely known by divine love. God too, made vulnerable to creation's "otherness," finds love's endeavor fulfilled... [when] all non-human creatures will be raised, fulfilled, and exalted".

== Critiques and rejoinders ==
=== Heaven ===
In what Robert John Russell describes as a "blistering attack by Wesley Wildman" on Southgate's theodicy, Wildman asserts that "if God really is to create a heavenly world of growth and change and relationality, yet no suffering", that world and not this world would be the best of all possible worlds, and a God that would not simply create that one, would be "flagrantly morally inconsistent".

Southgate has responded with what he calls an extension of the original argument: "that this evolutionary environment, full as it is of both competition and decay, is the only type of creation that can give rise to creaturely selves". That means "our guess must be that though heaven can eternally preserve those selves subsisting in suffering-free relationship, it could not give rise to them in the first place".

=== Chance, necessity and free will ===
Thomas F. Tracy offers a two point critique: "The first is the problem of purpose: can evolutionary processes, in which chance plays so prominent a role, be understood as the context of God's purposive action"? Tracy's second problem is the "pervasiveness of suffering and death in evolution".

Physicist and priest John Polkinghorne agrees with Tracy that chance is a necessary aspect of evolution: "Evolution is a costly business... full of both beauty and terror" that occurs by chance and necessity. Too much deterministic order, and there is no new life; too much undetermined chance and chaos, and life cannot adapt. According to Polkinghorne, the existence of chance does not negate the power and purposes of a Creator because "it is entirely possible that contingent processes can, in fact, lead to determined ends".

It is to equating chance with meaninglessness, a metaphysical assertion that goes beyond science, that Polkinghorne objects. While advocating for acceptance of the purely scientific, he also writes that an alternative meta-interpretation can be legitimately proposed. Polkinghorne says: "Science influences metaphysical understanding but it certainly does not simply determine it". When discussing the uncertainties and chance involved in the EPR effect (quantum entanglement), he describes the physical universe as emerging and open to affect by numerous causes, including the choices of free agents that impact what they and the universe become.

Concerning the pervasiveness of death and suffering, John T. Balwin asks: "Does God create through death and extinction as his method of choice? Is God, thereby, involved in the serial genocide of species?" In Polkinghorne's view, God is not a "Puppet–master pulling every string"; the process works according to its own mandates without God acting at every point. Francisco Ayala adds that the role of chance in evolution indicates "God is not the explicit designer of each facet of evolution".

In his evolutionary theodicy, Richard Kropf asserts that free will has its origins in the "evolutionary ramifications" of the existence of chance as part of the process, thereby providing a "causal connection" between natural evil and the possibility of human freedom: one cannot exist without the other. Polkinghorne also links the existence of human freedom to the flexibility created by randomness in the quantum world. He writes that this means "there is room for independent action in order for creatures to be themselves and "make themselves" in evolution. According to Polkinghorne:

"A world in which creatures 'make themselves' can be held to be a greater good than a ready-made world would have been, but it has an inescapable cost. Evolutionary processes will not only yield great fruitfulness, but they will also necessarily involve ragged edges and blind alleys. Genetic mutation will not only produce new forms of life, but it will also result in malignancy. One cannot have the one without the other. The existence of cancer is an anguishing fact about creation but it is not gratuitous, something that a Creator who was a bit more competent or a bit less callous could easily have avoided. It is part of the shadow side of the creative process... The more science helps us to understand the processes of the world, the more we see that the good and the bad are inextricably intertwined... It is all a package deal".

=== Values do not need evolution ===
Mats Wahlberg argues that evolutionary theodicies fail to show how unique type-values require evolution in order to be actualized in individual creatures. Asle Eikrem and Atle Ottesen Søvik argue that Wahlberg's critique fails when the distinction between type and token values is taken into consideration.

"A type-value is a value that can be instantiated at several times and places, e.g. joy... A token-value is an instantiation of a type-value at a certain time and place, e.g. the joy of attending the party yesterday at my neighbor's house". "...token-values are all instantiations of values occurring at a time and place. Among them are appreciated occurrences in the natural world such as a beautiful flower, or appreciated states of consciousness, such as being happy". Søvik and Eikrem assert that God created the universe in order to actualize both type - and token - unique values. They argue that indeterministic evolution is of value to God because it actualizes type-values, while "the actualization of type-unique values [through natural selection] is morally justifiable only insofar as it allows for certain token-unique values" as well.

Søvik and Eikrem reference Keith Ward as outlining an evolutionary theodicy that shows how both type and token values require evolution. Examples of these values are: genuine independence (that beings have the freewill to influence what happens), self-creating creation (that beings cause their own characteristics over time), the creativity of creation (that new things occur), and surprise (that unexpected things occur). Søvik and Eikrem also use Lorenz B. Puntel's Structure and Being: A Theoretical Framework for a Systematic Philosophy to demonstrate that biological entities, such as humans, get their identity from their token-unique relations. Ward asserts that God could not have created "the you that is you" in another universe, because what gives each individual unique token value is the particular structure of their personal history. This means that "evolution is necessary for the token individuals of this world to exist". Søvik and Eikrem conclude their rejoinder to Wahlberg by saying that, because God wanted to actualize values that are both type-unique and token-unique, God had to create this universe by evolutionary means.

=== General theological opposition ===
A key point of evolutionary theodicy is that the Fall is part of a pre-scientific worldview. Evolutionary theodicists also have other basic presuppositions that Rodrigues says legitimize evil, imply God's creation does not have a purpose apart from eschatology (life after the end), and make it difficult to sustain classic theological views.

== See also ==
- Nature Red in Tooth and Claw
