= Christian ethics =

Branch of theology that defines virtuous and sinful behavior from a Christian perspective

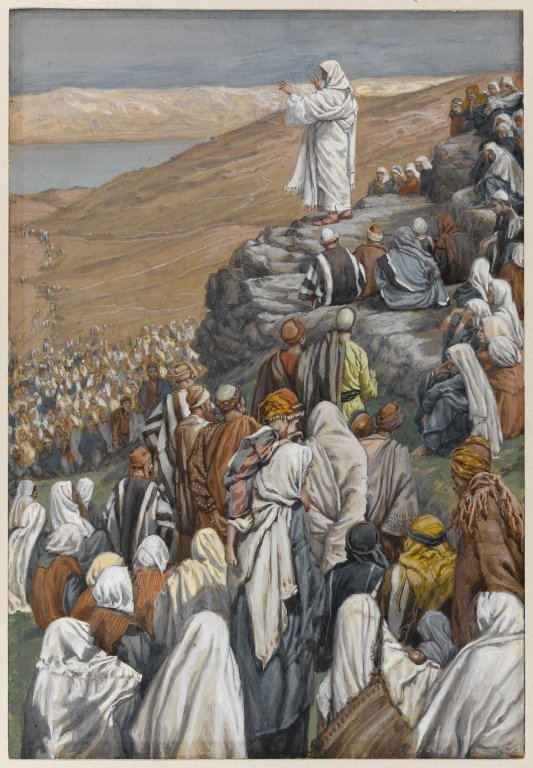
Sermon of the Beatitudes depicts Jesus' Sermon on the Mount, in which he summarized his ethical teachings. James Tissot, c. 1890

Christian ethics, also known as moral theology, is a multi-faceted ethical system. It is a virtue ethic, which focuses on building moral character, and a deontological ethic which emphasizes duty according to the Christian perspective. It also incorporates natural law ethics, which is built on the belief that it is the very nature of humans – created in the image of God and capable of morality, cooperation, rationality, discernment and so on – that informs how life should be lived, and that awareness of sin does not require special revelation. Other aspects of Christian ethics, represented by movements such as the social Gospel and liberation theology, may be combined into a fourth area sometimes called prophetic ethics.

Christian ethics derives its metaphysical core from the Bible, seeing God as the ultimate source of all power. Evidential, Reformed and volitional epistemology are the three most common forms of Christian epistemology. The variety of ethical perspectives in the Bible has led to repeated disagreement over defining the basic Christian ethical principles, with at least seven major principles undergoing perennial debate and reinterpretation. Christian ethicists use reason, philosophy, natural law, the social sciences, and the Bible to formulate modern interpretations of those principles; Christian ethics applies to all areas of personal and societal ethics.

Originating in early Christianity from c. 27 to 325 AD, Christian ethics continued to develop during the Middle Ages, when the rediscovery of Aristotle led to scholasticism and the writings of Thomas Aquinas (1225–1274). The Reformation of the fifteenth and sixteenth centuries, the subsequent counter-Reformation, and Christian humanism heavily impacted Christian ethics, particularly its political and economic teachings. A branch of Christian theology for most of its history, Christian ethics separated from theology during the eighteenth and nineteenth centuries. For most scholars of the twenty-first century, Christian ethics fits in a niche between theology on one side and the social sciences on the other.

== Definition and sources ==
Christian ethics, also referred to as moral theology, was a branch of theology for most of its history. Becoming a separate field of study during the Enlightenment of the eighteenth and nineteenth centuries, for most 21st-century scholars it has become a "discipline of reflection and analysis that lies between theology on one side and the social sciences on the other" says Christian ethicist Waldo Beach.

Christian ethics is a virtue ethic which focuses on developing an ethical character, beginning with obedience to a set of rules and laws seen as divine commands. These behaviors are morally required, forbidden, or permitted. Although character-based virtue ethics and rule-based deontological ethics are normally seen as contrasting with one another, they are combined in Christian ethics.

Claire Brown Peterson calls the Christian ethic a natural law ethic, writing that the New Testament contains "the expectation that humans are capable of knowing much of how they should live apart from explicit divine instructions ... Thus Gentiles who lack the revelation of scripture are said to have the law 'written on their hearts' (Romans 2:15) so that they can [legitimately] be held accountable when they violate what they are capable of seeing is right." Wilkins says that in this view, the primary moral laws are universally known, are discernible through reason, are innate in all people (and, therefore, binding on all), and their practice contributes to individual and community well-being. Elements of each of these theories can be found in the Bible and the early church.

By the twenty-first century, additional traditions had formed in Christian ethics based on different interpretations of divine attributes, how God communicates moral knowledge, differing anthropological conclusions, and different ideas about how the believer should relate to the Christian community and the outside world. One aspect of these differences, which focuses on the church and its mission, developed into what Wilkins calls prophetic ethics. Its starting point is social justice and Jesus' "kingdom ideals", rather than individual morality; it recognizes the group dimension of sin, and tends to be critical of (and challenge) the other Christian ethical theories. Anabaptism is an early incorporation of the prophetic model reaching back to the Radical Reformation. They differed from other Reformation groups in that they saw the church as a unique type of human organization and its problems, not as theological, but as ethical failures rooted in entanglement with politics. Anabaptism began among the dispossessed and persecuted with isolationist tendencies, whereas modern versions, such as the Social Gospel movement, have turned toward cultural engagement. Post-colonial thought, and black, feminist and liberation theologies are examples of this Christian ethic engaging the "sinfulness of the social order".

According to Servais Pinckaers, moral theologian and Roman Catholic priest, the sources of Christian ethics are the "Scriptures, the Holy Spirit, the Gospel law, and natural law." The four sources of Wesleyan theology are the Bible, tradition, reason, and Christian experience (an experience of the decisive adoption of Christianity). Christian ethics takes from the Bible its normative rules focusing on conduct, its basic understanding of natural law, its patterns of moral reasoning which focus on character, and the ideals of a community built on social justice. Philip Wogaman writes that Christian ethics has also had a "sometimes intimate, sometimes uneasy" relationship with Greek and Roman philosophy, taking some aspects of its principles from Plato, Aristotle and other Hellenic philosophers.

== Historical background ==
=== Early Christianity ===
Christian ethics began its development during the early Christian period, which is generally defined as having begun with the ministry of Jesus (c. 27 AD–30) and ended with the First Council of Nicaea in 325. It emerged from the heritage shared by both Judaism and Christianity, and depended upon the Hebrew canon as well as important legacies from Greek and Hellenistic philosophy.

The Council of Jerusalem, reported in chapter 15 of the Acts of the Apostles, may have been held in about AD 50. The council's decrees to abstain from blood, sexual immorality, meat sacrificed to idols, and the meat of strangled animals were considered generally binding for all Christians for several centuries, and are still observed by the Greek Orthodox Church. (Note: Karl Josef von Hefele's commentary on canon II of Gangra Archived 20 December 2016 at the Wayback Machine notes: "We further see that, at the time of the Synod of Gangra [in the fourth century], the rule of the Apostolic Synod with regard to blood and things strangled was still in force. With the Greeks, indeed, it continued always in force as their Euchologies still show... St. Augustine ...states that the Apostles had given this command in order to unite the heathens and Jews in the one ark of Noah; but that then, when the barrier between Jewish and heathen converts had fallen, this command concerning things strangled and blood had lost its meaning, and was only observed by few... its decree has been obsolete for centuries in the West...")

Pope Leo XIV notes that for the Fathers of the Church, the practice of charity shown to those in need was both a moral virtue and an expression of Christian faith.

Early Christian writings give evidence of the hostile social setting in the Roman Empire, which prompted Christians to think through aspects of Roman society in Christian terms. Christian ethics sought "moral instruction on specific problems and practices" which were not sophisticated ethical analyses, but simple applications of the teachings (and example) of Jesus about issues such as the role of women, sexuality and slavery. After Christianity became legal in the 4th-century Roman Empire, the range and sophistication of Christian ethics expanded. Through figures such as Augustine of Hippo, Christian ethical teachings defined Christian thought for several centuries; For example, Augustine's ethic concerning the Jews meant that "with the marked exception of Visigothic Spain in the seventh century, Jews in Latin Christendom lived relatively peacefully with their Christian neighbors through most of the Middle Ages" (until about the 13th century).

=== Middle Ages ===
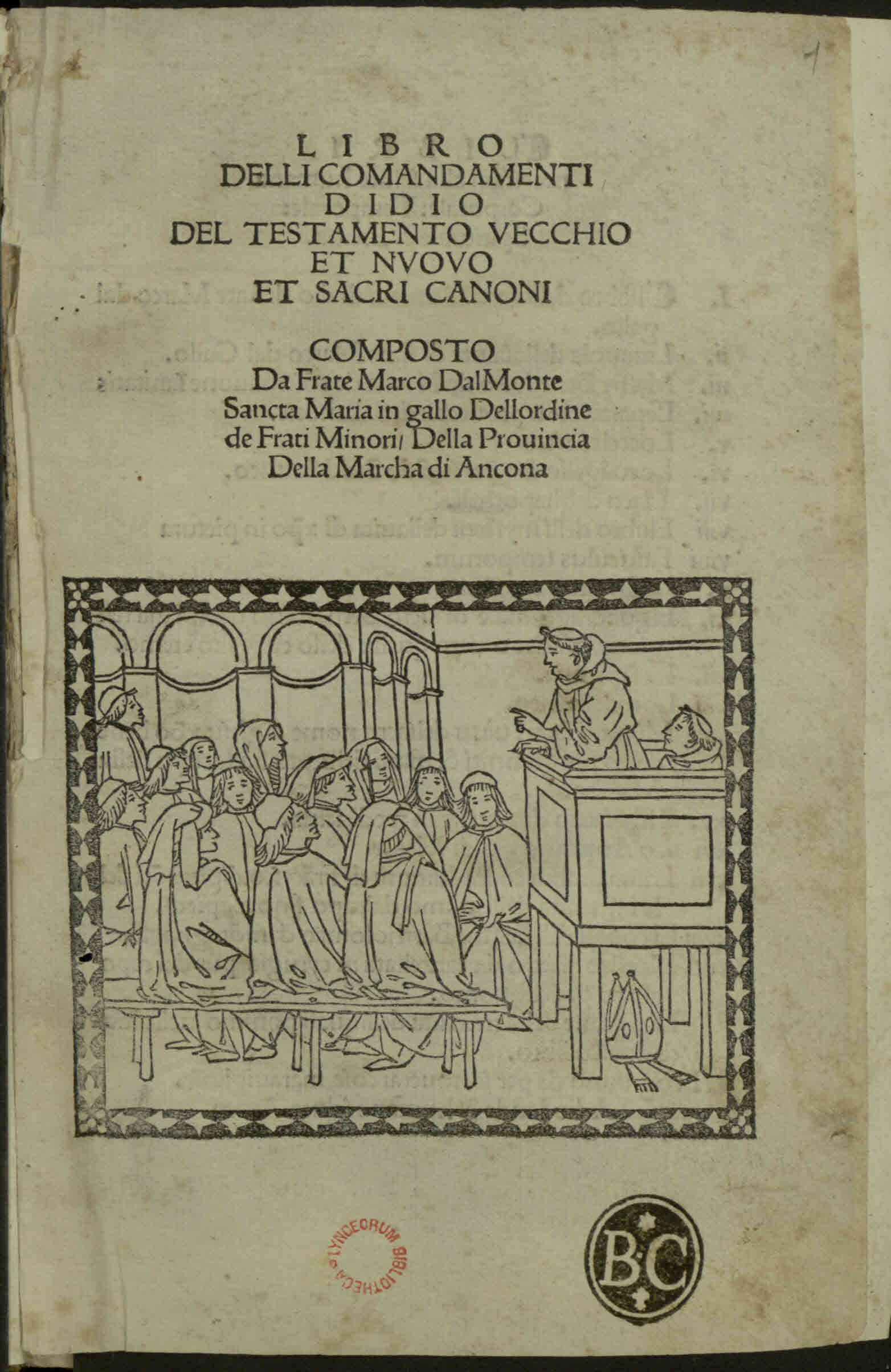
Marco da Montegallo, Libro dei comandamenti di Dio ("Book of the Commandments of God"), 1494

In the centuries following the Fall of the Western Roman Empire, monks on missionary journeys spread practices of penance and repentance using books known as penitentials. Theologian Christoph Luthardt describes Christian ethics of the Middle Ages as listing "7 capital sins... 7 works of mercy, 7 sacraments, 7 principle virtues, 7 gifts of the Spirit, 8 beatitudes, 10 commandments, 12 articles of faith and 12 fruits of faith". Crusade historian Jonathan Riley-Smith says that the Crusades were products of the renewed spirituality of the High Middle Ages (1000–1250), when the ethic of living the Apostolic life and chivalry began to form. The Middle Ages and the Renaissance saw a number of models of sin, listing the seven deadly sins and the virtues opposed to each.

Inaccurate Latin translations of classical writings were replaced in the twelfth century with more accurate ones. This led to an intellectual revolution called scholasticism, which was an effort to harmonize Aristotle's thoughts and Christian thought. In response to the dilemmas this effort created, Thomas Aquinas (1225–1274) wrote "one of the outstanding achievements of the High Middle Ages", the Summa Theologica. His positions were eventually developed into the school of thought known as Thomism, which contains many ethical teachings that continue to be used, especially within the Roman Catholic Church.

=== Reformation, Counter-Reformation and Christian humanism ===
Martin Luther, in his classic treatise On the Freedom of a Christian (1520) argued that moral effort is a response to grace: ethically, humans are not made good by the things they do, but if they are made good by God's love, they will be impelled to do good things. John Calvin adopted and systematized Luther's main ideas, grounding everything in the sovereignty of God. In Calvin's view, all humans have a vocation, a calling, and the guiding measure of its value is simply whether it impedes or furthers God's will. This gives a "sacredness" to the most mundane and ordinary of actions leading to the development of the Protestant work ethic. Where some reformers such as Huldrych Zwingli regarded church and state as identical, Calvin separated church and state by stating that God worked through the church spiritually, and directly in the world through civil government, each with their own sphere of influence. Using natural law, the Old Testament covenant model and his reformation theology and ethics, Calvin provided the grassroots "federal theology" used by "nations and churches struggling for justice and liberty". These reformers contributed ideas of popular sovereignty, asserting that human beings are not "subjects of the state but are members of the state". During the Reformation, Protestant Christians pioneered the ethics of religious toleration and religious freedom. Protestants also valued virtue ethics. After the Reformation, Aristotle's Nicomachean Ethics continued to be the main authority for the discipline of ethics at Protestant universities until the late seventeenth century, with over fifty Protestant commentaries published on the Nicomachean Ethics before 1682.

Max Weber asserted that there is a correlation between the ethics of the Reformers and the predominantly Protestant countries where modern capitalism and modern democracy developed first. The secular ideologies of the Age of Enlightenment followed shortly on the heels of the Reformation, but the influence of Christian ethics was such that J. Philip Wogaman, pastor and professor of Christian ethics, asks "whether those (Enlightenment) ideas would have been as successful in the absence of the Reformation, or even whether they would have taken the same form".

The Roman Catholic Church of the 16th century responded to Reformation Protestantism in three ways. First, through the Counter-Reformation which began with Pope Paul III (1534–1549). Secondly, through the new monastic orders which grew in response to the challenges which Protestantism presented. The most influential of these new orders was the Order of Jesuits. The Jesuits' commitment to education put them at the forefront of many colonial missions. The third response was by the Council of Trent in 1545 and 1563. The Council asserted that the Bible and church tradition were the foundations of church authority, not just the Bible (sola scriptura) as Protestants asserted; the Vulgate was the only official Bible and other versions were rejected; salvation was through faith and works, not faith alone; and the seven sacraments were reaffirmed. According to Matthews and Dewitt, "The moral, doctrinal and disciplinary results of the Council of Trent laid the foundations for Roman Catholic policies and thought right up to the present."

Christian humanism taught the radical new idea that any Christian with a "pure and humble heart could pray directly to God" without the intervention of a priest. Matthews and Platt write that, "The outstanding figure among the northern humanists—and possibly the outstanding figure among all humanists—is the Dutch scholar Desiderius Erasmus". His ethical views included advocating a humble and virtuous life, "the study of Classics, and honoring the dignity of the individual". He promoted the Christian ethic as expressed in the Sermon on the Mount (Matthew 5:1 – 7:27).

=== Modern Christian ethics ===
After separating from theology, the primary concern of nineteenth century Christian ethicists was the study of human nature. "Beginning with the rise of Christian social theory" in the nineteenth century, theologian John Carman says Christian ethics became heavily oriented toward discussion of nature and society, wealth, work, and human equality. Carman adds that, in the nineteenth and twentieth centuries, "the appeal to inner experience, the renewed interest in human nature, and the influence of social conditions upon ethical reflection introduced new directions to Christian ethics".

Carman adds that the question of how the Christian and the church relates to the surrounding world "has led to the development of three distinct types of modern Christian ethics: "the church, sect and mystical types". In the church type (i.e., Roman Catholicism and mainstream Protestantism), the Christian ethic is lived within the world, through marriage, family, and work, while living within and participating in their respective towns, cities and nations. This ethic is meant to permeate every area of life. The ethic of the sect (i.e., Amish, Mennonites, some monastic orders) works in the opposite direction. It is practiced by withdrawing from the non-Christian world, minimizing interaction with that world, while living outside or above the world in communities separated from other municipalities. The mystical type (i.e., some monastic orders, some parts of the charismatic movement and evangelicalism) advocates an ethic that is purely an inward experience of personal piety and spirituality and often includes asceticism.

In the 20th century it became manifest that Christian ethics is not the same as the ethics of the Bible.

In the Catholic Church, the Second Vatican Council (1963-1965) made particular reference to moral theology in its call for a revision of the courses of study offered to its clergy in training:

Special care must be given to the perfecting of moral theology. Its scientific exposition, nourished more on the teaching of the Bible, should shed light on the loftiness of the calling of the faithful in Christ and the obligation ... of bearing fruit in charity for the life of the world.

In the late twentieth century, these and other differences contributed to the creation of new varieties of Christian ethics. The Anabaptists, the Social Gospel movement, postcolonialism, black theology, feminist theology, and liberation theology focus first and foremost on social justice, the "kingdom ideals" of Jesus, recognize the community-based dimension of sin, and are critical of the traditional theories of Christian ethics.

In the early twenty-first century, William J. Meyer, a professor of philosophy and religion at Maryville College, asserted that Christian ethicists often find themselves on one side of a discussion of ethics, while those advocating a secular worldview that denies God and anything transcendent are their opponents on the other side. He says these discussions are divided by beliefs about how claims ought to be addressed, since both sides assume there is a polarity between human reason and the authority of scripture and tradition. Meyer asserts that the answer to this difficulty lies in modern Christian ethics embracing standards of rationality and coherence, while rejecting the secular worldview and its premises and conclusions. Meyer describes this effort to affirm religion "within the context of modern secularity" as "the critical fault line in the contemporary world".

== Philosophical core ==
Gustafson sets out four basic points he asserts that any theologically grounded ethic must address:

- metaphysics: all other concepts and beliefs rest on metaphysics; it is about how being and existence are defined through God, His will and His relation to humans;
- epistemology: how humans know, and distinguish, justified belief from mere opinion, through human experience, community, nature and man's place in it;
- ethics: the system and principles used by persons as moral agents;
- applications: how persons make moral choices, judge their own acts, the acts of others, and the state of the world.

=== Metaphysical foundations ===
The Christian metaphysic is rooted in the biblical metaphysic of God as "Maker of Heaven and earth". Philosopher Mark Smith explains that, in the Bible, a fundamental ontology is embodied in language about power, where the world and its beings derive their reality (their being, their power to exist, and to act) from the power of God (Being itself). Theology and philosophy professor Jaco Gericke says that metaphysics is found anywhere the Bible has something to say about "the nature of existence". According to Rolf Knierim, the Bible's metaphysic is "dynamistic ontology" which says reality is an ongoing dynamic process. In this view, God "gives the universe its basic order", and its "formal statistical patterns", generally referred to as natural laws, but also allows them to develop organically with minimum interference.

According to Roger E. Olson, the Christian view of the nature of reality can also be called "biblical theism" or "biblical personalism": the belief that "ultimate reality is a personal God who acts, shows and speaks..." Mark Smith explains that, in metaphysical language, the power of lesser beings participates in Power itself, which is identified as God. Humanity is the highest level of development in creation, but humans are still creatures. This view asserts that humans reflect the relational nature of God. In the Christian metaphysic, humans have free will, but it is a relative and restricted freedom. Beach says that Christian voluntarism points to the will as the core of the self, and that within human nature, "the core of who we are is defined by what we love", and this determines the direction of moral action.

Humans reflect the nature of ultimate reality, therefore they are seen as having a basic dignity and value and should be treated, as Immanuel Kant said, as "an end in themselves" and not as a means to an end. Humans have a capacity for reason and free will which enable making rational choices. They have the natural capacity to distinguish right and wrong which is often called a conscience or natural law. When guided by reason, conscience and grace, humans develop virtues and laws. In Christian metaphysics according to Beach, "Eternal Law is the transcendent blueprint of the whole order of the universe... Natural Law is the enactment of God's eternal law in the created world and discerned by human reason."

==== Paul ====
Some older scholarship saw Paul's moral instruction as separate from his theology, saying his ethic was adopted from Hellenist philosophy. Modern scholarship has broken up these old paradigms. "Christianity began its existence as one among several competing Jewish sects or movements. Judaism was not one thing, either in Judea and Galilee or in the Diaspora, nor were the boundaries among the varieties of Judaism fixed or impermeable". Paul's writings reflect this mix.

He called himself a "Hebrew of Hebrews" but he did so in fluent Greek. He avoided the high Atticistic Greek style of rhetoric but invented his own by making use of the strategies of the Greco-Roman orators. He employed Jewish strategies for interpretation and used the Jewish traditions for reading the apocalyptic scriptures including the sectarian and what would later be the rabbinic ones. But he was also aware of the Greco-Roman philosophical discussions of his day. He mixed things that modern scholars have seen as unmixable, changing and transforming key elements within the Jewish/Hellenist paradigm into something uniquely Christian.

Paul's theological and apocalyptic views form the foundation of his ethical views, and the foundation of Paul's theology is the cross of Christ. When the Corinthian church begins in-fighting, Paul responds by saying they have abandoned their core teachings: the cross and the centrality of God. These were the themes that formed the foundation of all of Paul's preaching. The cross informs Paul's ethic theologically, eschatological, and Christologically, reconciling people to God but also summoning them to service.

"Paul has more to say about human nature [and ethical behavior] than any other early Christian author", and Paul holds up the cross as motivation for ethical conduct. Practicing the cross by living with the self, crucified, is associated in 1 Corinthians and Ephesians with Christian unity, self-sacrifice, and the Christian's future hope. "The cross is increasingly recognized as providing a general foundation for Christian ethics".

=== Epistemology ===
Christian ethics asserts that it is possible for humans to know and recognize truth and moral good through the application of both reason and revelation. Observation, reasoned deduction and personal experiences, which includes grace, are the means of that knowledge. Rabbinic scholar Michael Fishbane goes on to add that human knowledge of God is understood through language, and "It is arguably one of Judaism's greatest contributions to the history of religions to assert that the divine Reality is communicated to mankind through words."

Evidentialism in epistemology, which is advocated by Richard Swinburne (1934–), says a person must have some awareness of evidence for a belief for them to be justified in holding that belief. People hold many beliefs that are difficult to evidentially justify, so some philosophers have adopted a form of reliabilism instead. In reliablilism, a person can be seen as justified in a belief, so long as the belief is produced by a reliable means even when they do not know all the evidence.

Alvin Plantinga (1932–) and Nicholas Wolterstorff (1932–) advocate Reformed epistemology taken from Reformer John Calvin's (1509–1564) teaching that persons are created with a sense of God (sensus divinitatis). Even when this sense is not apparent to the person because of sin, it can still prompt them to believe and live a life of faith. This means belief in God may be seen as a properly basic belief similar to other basic human beliefs such as the belief that other persons exist, and the world exists, just as we believe we exist ourselves. Such a basic belief is what Plantinga calls a "warranted" belief even in the absence of evidence.

Paul Moser argues for volitional epistemology. He systematically contends that, if the God of Christianity exists, this God would not be evident to persons who are simply curious, but would instead, only become evident in a process involving moral and spiritual transformation. "This process might involve persons accepting Jesus Christ as a redeemer who calls persons to a radical life of loving compassion, even the loving of our enemies. By willfully subjecting oneself to the commanding love of God, a person in this filial relationship with God, through Christ, may experience a change of character (from self-centeredness to serving others) in which the person's character (or very being) may come to serve as evidence of the truths of faith."

According to Gustafson, Christian epistemology is built on different assumptions than those of philosophical epistemology. He says the Christian ethic assumes either a condition of piety, or at least a longing for piety. He defines piety as an attitude of respect evoked by "human experiences of dependence upon powers we do not create and cannot fully master". Gustafson adds that such piety must be open to a wide variety of human experiences, including "data and theories about the powers that order life..." He says this Christian knowing engages the affections, and takes the form of a sense of gratitude. Gustafson sees trust as an aspect of such knowing: underneath science is a trust that there is an identifiable order and discoverable principles beneath the disarray of complex data; this is comparable to the trust of the Christian faith that "there is unity, order, form and meaning in the cosmos ...of divine making". Gustafson adds that: "Knowledge conditions are relative to particular communities" and all human knowledge is based on the experiences we have in the cultures within which we live.

=== Basic ethical principles ===
Christian ethics asserts the ontological nature of moral norms from God, but it is also accountable to standards of rationality and coherence; it must make its way through both what is ideal and what is possible. Thus, Beach asserts that some principles are seen as "more authoritative than others. The spirit, not the letter, of biblical laws becomes normative."

The diversity of the Bible means that it does not have a single ethical perspective but instead has a variety of perspectives; this has given rise to disagreements over defining the foundational principles of Christian ethics. For example, reason has been a foundation for Christian ethics alongside revelation from its beginnings, but Wogaman points out that Christian ethicists have not always agreed upon "the meaning of revelation, the nature of reason, and the proper way to employ the two together". He says there are at least seven ethical principles that Christian ethicists have perennially reinterpreted.

==== Good and evil ====
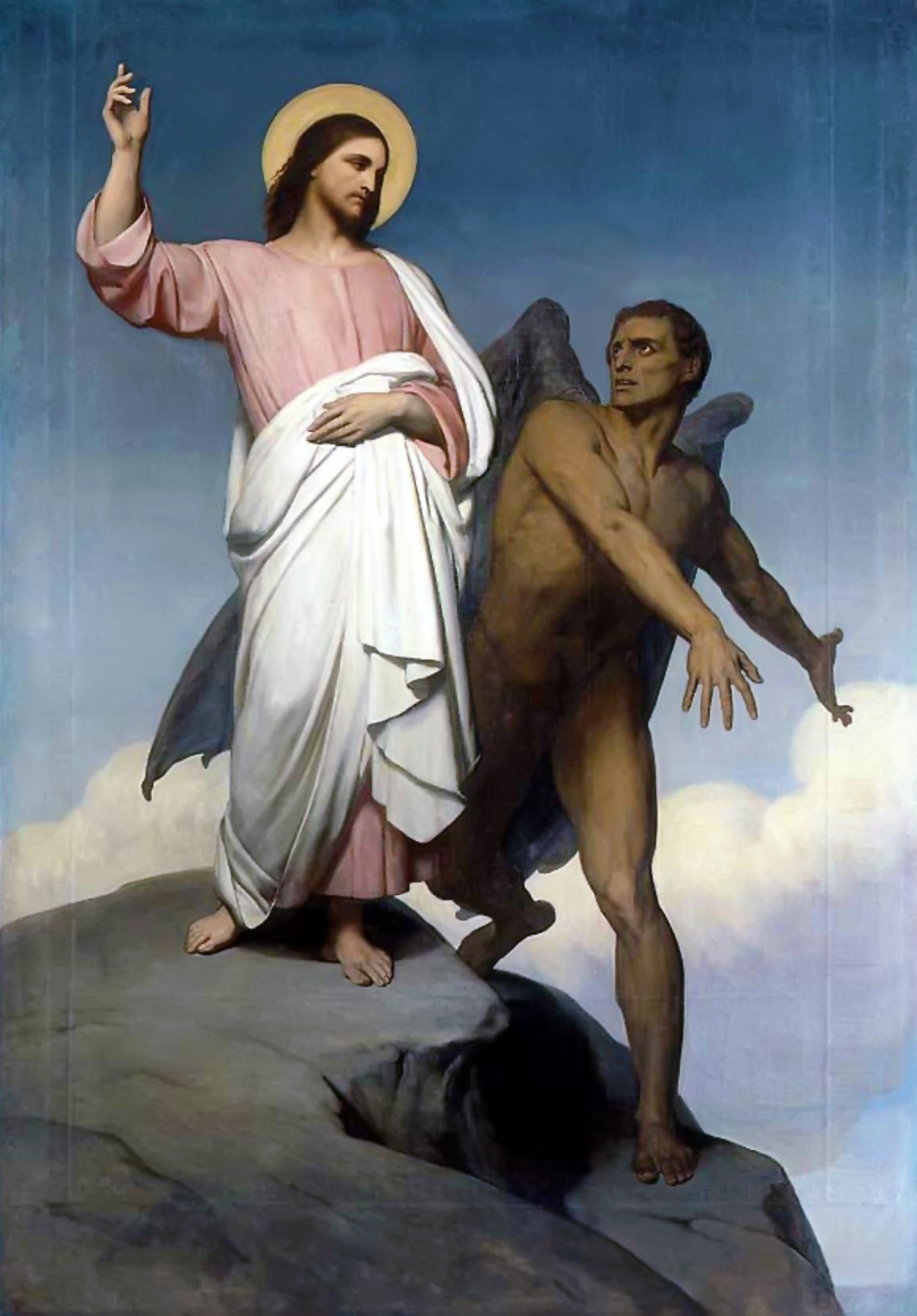
The devil, in opposition to the will of God, represents evil and tempts Christ, the personification of the character and will of God. Ary Scheffer, 1854.

Since the Christian ethic begins with God as the source of all, and since God is defined as the ultimate good, the presence of evil and suffering in the world creates questions often referred to as the problem of evil. Philosopher David Hume summarizes: "Is God willing to prevent evil, but not able? Then he is not omnipotent. Is he able, but not willing? Then he is malevolent. Is he both able and willing? Then from whence comes evil?" Addressing this requires a theological and philosophical response which John Hick thinks is the Christian ethic's greatest challenge.

Todd Calder says there are at least two concepts of evil applicable to this question: a broad concept and a narrow one. A broad concept of evil defines it as any and all pain and suffering, but this quickly becomes problematic. Evil cannot be correctly understood on a simple scale of pleasure vs. pain, since the National Institute of medicine says pain is essential for survival. Marcus Singer says that a workable definition of evil requires that: "If something is really evil, it can't be necessary, and if it is really necessary, it can't be evil." The Christian story "is a story of the salvific value of suffering", therefore the Christian ethic, while assuming the reality of evil and recognizing the power of suffering, does not support the view that all suffering is evil. The narrow definition of evil is used instead. It is defined as the attempt or desire to inflict significant harm on a victim, without moral justification, perpetrated only by moral agents capable of independent choices.

The Christian ethic offers three main responses to the problem of evil and a good God. The freewill defense by Alvin Plantinga assumes that a world containing creatures who are significantly free is an innately more valuable world than one containing no free creatures at all, and that God could not have made such a world without including the possibility of evil and suffering. The soul-making theodicy advocated by John Hick (Irenaean theodicy) says God allows suffering because it has value for building moral character. Christian ethicists such as David Ray Griffin have also produced process theodicies which assert God's power and ability to influence events are, of necessity, limited by human creatures with wills of their own.

Nicola Hoggard Creegan says natural evil exists in the form of animal suffering, and she offers a theodicy in response that is based on the parable of the wheat and the tares (Matthew 13:24–29). She argues that nature can be understood as an intertwined mix of the perfect and the corrupted, that God could not have made one without allowing the existence of the other, and that this is because of the natural laws involved in creation. Christian ethicists such as Christopher Southgate have also produced evolutionary theodicies which use evolution to show that the suffering of biological creatures, and belief in a loving and almighty God, are logically compatible.

Generally, Christians ethicists do not claim to know the answer to the "Why?" of evil. Plantinga stresses that this is why he does not proffer a theodicy but only a defense of the logic of theistic belief. The approach of Christian ethics to pain and evil is summarized by Sarah Pinnock who asserts that: "Direct contact with God does not answer Job's questions, but it makes meaning, and the acceptance of suffering, possible."

==== Inclusivity, exclusivity and pluralism ====
There is an inherent tension between inclusivity and exclusivity in all the Abrahamic traditions. According to the book of Genesis, Abraham is the recipient of the promise of God to become a great nation. The promise is given to him and his "seed", exclusively, yet the promise also includes that he will become a blessing to all nations, inclusively (Genesis 12:3). The God of the Bible is the inclusive God of all nations and all people (Galatians 3:28), and the Great Commission (Matthew 28:19) is a command to go to all nations, yet Wogaman points out that Christians are referred to in the New Testament as the "elect" (Romans 8:33 Matthew 24:22) implying God has chosen some and not others for salvation. Christians and non-Christians have, throughout much of history, faced significant moral and legal questions concerning this ethical tension. During the Reformation, Christians pioneered the concept of religious freedom which rests upon an acceptance of the necessity and value of pluralism, a modern-day concept often referred to as moral ecology.

==== Law, grace and human rights ====
Christian ethics emphasizes morality. The law and the commandments are set within the context of devotion to God but are deontological standards defining what this morality is. The prophets of the Old Testament show God as rejecting all unrighteousness and injustice and commending those who live moral lives. In tension with this, there is also "a deep expression of God's love for undeserving sinners". Wogaman says the apostle Paul refers to this as grace: "being treated as innocent when one is guilty". Wogaman argues that: "Part of the biblical legacy of Christian ethics is the necessity somehow to do justice to both" law and grace. Author Stanley Rudman asserts that human rights (as defined post–WWII) is the language through which the Christian ethic is able to relate these concepts to the world. In a convergence of opinion among Catholics, Lutherans, Reformed, and others, this has led to a support of human rights becoming common to all varieties of Christian ethics.

==== Authority, force and personal conscience ====
Wogaman asserts that "love is, and must remain", the foundation of the Christian ethical system. In the Sermon on the Mount, Jesus summarizes his ethical teachings to those who would follow a new path that diverged from established law: "turn the other cheek" Matthew 5:38–39, "love your enemies" Matthew 5:43–45, "bless those who persecute you" Romans 12:14–21. Jesus' followers must not murder, as the law says, but they must also not hold the kind of hatred that leads to it, but must forgive instead. Wogaman adds that, "justice, as the institutional structure of love, is inevitably dependent upon other incentives including, ultimately, the use of force". Both the Old and the New Testaments give explicit commands to respect the state's authority to "carry the sword" (Romans 13:4). Christian ethics is, and has been repeatedly, divided over this interaction between obedience to authority and authority's power to enforce that obedience in contrast with one's personal responsibility to love and forgive.

==== Self-affirmation and self-denial ====
According to the book of Genesis, God created and declared creation, including humans, good (Genesis 1:31). The Song of Songs depicts sensual love as good. Other parts of the Old Testament depict material prosperity as a reward. Yet, the New Testament references the life of the Spirit as the ultimate goal, and warns against worldliness. In the traditional view, this requires self-sacrifice, self-denial and self-discipline, and greatness lies in being a servant to all (Mark 10:42–45). Yet according to ethicist Darlene Weaver, "there is no ontological split between self/other; there is no monolithic polarity of self-interested action versus other-regardingness". Christian ethics has not traditionally contained concepts of self-love as a good. However, Koji Yoshino asserts that, within the Christian ethic, "altruistic love and self-love are not contradictory to each other. Those who do not love themselves cannot love others, nevertheless, those who ignore others cannot love themselves."

==== Wealth and poverty ====
There are a variety of Christian views on poverty and wealth. At one end of the spectrum is a view which casts wealth and materialism as an evil to be avoided and even combatted. At the other end is a view which casts prosperity and well-being as a blessing from God. The Christian ethic is not an opponent of poverty since Jesus embraced it, but it is an opponent of the destitution that results from social injustice. Kevin Hargaden says "No Christian ethic can offer a consistent defense of massive wealth inequality." Some Christians argue that a proper understanding of Christian teachings on wealth and poverty requires a larger view where the accumulation of wealth is not the central focus of one's life but rather a resource to foster the "good life". Professor David W. Miller has constructed a three-part rubric which presents three prevalent attitudes among Protestants towards wealth: that wealth is (1) an offense to the Christian faith (2) an obstacle to faith and (3) the outcome of faith.

==== Gender and sexuality ====
Classicist Kyle Harper writes that sexuality was at the heart of Christianity's early clash with its surrounding culture. Rome's concept of sexual morality was centered on social status, whereas the Christian ethic was a "radical notion of individual freedom centered around a libertarian paradigm of complete sexual agency". This meant the ethical obligation for sexual self-control was placed on the individual, male and female, slave and free, equally, in all communities, regardless of status. In Paul's letters, porneia was a single name for the array of sexual behaviors outside marital intercourse that became a central defining concept of sexual morality, and shunning it, a key sign of choosing to follow Jesus. For Paul, "the body was a consecrated space, a point of mediation between the individual and the divine".

Views on sexuality in the early church were diverse and fiercely debated within its various communities, and this continues. Throughout the majority of Christian history, most Christian theologians and denominations have considered homosexual behavior as immoral or sinful. In contemporary Christian ethics, there are a variety of views on the issues of sexual orientation and homosexuality. The many Christian denominations vary from condemning homosexual acts as sinful, to being divided on the issue, and to seeing it as morally acceptable. Even within a denomination, individuals and groups may hold different views. Further, not all members of a denomination necessarily support their church's views on homosexuality.

== Applied ethics ==
=== Politics ===
Christian involvement in politics is both supported and opposed by the different types of Christian ethics. Political scientist Amy E. Black says Jesus' command to pay taxes (Matthew 22:21), was not simply an endorsement of government, but was also a refusal to participate in the fierce political debate of his day over the poll tax. Old Testament scholar Gordon Wenham says: Jesus' response "implied loyalty to a pagan government was not incompatible with loyalty to God".

==== War and peace ====
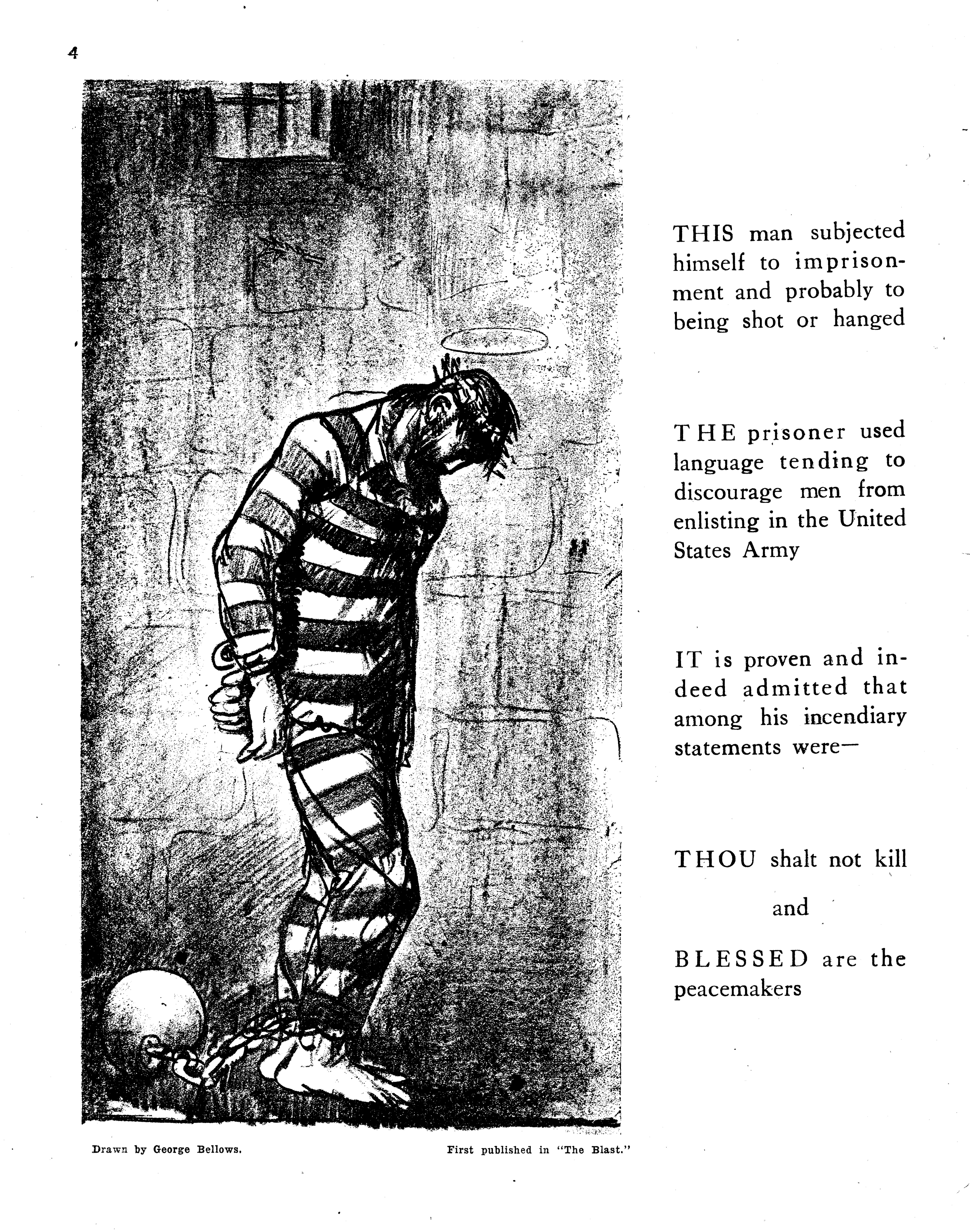
Blessed are the Peacemakers (1917) by George Bellows

The Christian ethic addresses warfare from the differing viewpoints of pacifism, non-resistance, just war, and preventive war, which is sometimes called crusade. Where pacifism and non-resistance can be seen as ideals in action, evangelical theologian Harold O. J. Brown describes just wars, preventive wars and crusades as "actions in support of an ideal". In all four views, the Christian ethic presumes war is immoral and must not be waged or supported by Christians until certain conditions have been met that enable the setting aside of that presumption.

Pacifism and non-resistance are opposed to all forms of physical violence based on belief that the example of Christ demonstrates it is better to suffer personally than to do harm to others. Non-resistance allows for non-combatant service where pacifism does not. They both presuppose the supersession of the New Testament over the Old, and believe in the separation of church and state to the degree the Christian does not owe obedience and loyalty to the state if that loyalty violates personal conscience. Both pacifism and non-resistance are interpreted as applying to individual believers, not corporate bodies, or "unregenerate worldly governments". Mennonite minister Myron Augsburger says pacifism and non-resistance act as a conscience to society and as an active force for reconciliation and peace.

Preventive war, also sometimes referred to as crusade, and just war recognize that harm can result from failing to resist a tyrannical enemy. Preventive war is waged in anticipation of an act of aggression that would violate ideals of human rights, decency, and a sense of right and wrong. Counter-terrorism is a kind of preventive war. Preventive war/crusade can also be seen as an attempt to set right a past act of aggression that was not responded to at the time it occurred. It is not necessarily religious in nature or focus, but "attempts to undo what no one had the right to do in the first place": the First Crusade of the Middle Ages, the First Gulf War, and World War II. Supporters of Just War theory say war can only be justified as self-defense or the defense of others. The biblical provisos for these types of war are not supersessionist, and therefore are more from the Old Testament than the New.

The last 200 years have seen a shift toward just war in the moral focus concerning the state's use of force. Justification for war in the twenty-first century has become the ethic of intervention based on humanitarian goals of protecting the innocent.

==== Criminal justice ====
Early criminal justice began with the idea that God is the ultimate source of justice, and is the judge of all, including those administering justice on earth. Within Christian ethics, this view places the greatest responsibility for justice on judges with moral character, who are admonished not to lie or be deceptive, not to practice racial prejudice or discrimination, or to let egoism lead them to abuse their authority, as central to the administration of justice. Biblical ethicist Christopher Marshall says there are features of covenant law from the Old Testament that have been adopted and adapted to contemporary human rights law, such as due process, fairness in criminal procedures, and equity in the application of law.

How justice is defined has varied. Aristotle's classic definition of justice, giving each their due, entered into Christian ethics through scholasticism and Thomas Aquinas in the Middle Ages. For Aristotle and Aquinas that meant a hierarchical society with each receiving what was due according to their social status. This allows for the criminal justice system to be retributive, to discriminate based on social standing, and fails to recognize a concept of universal human rights and responsibilities. Philip Wogaman says that after Aquinas, the Radical Reformation, the social gospel and liberation theology redefined getting one's due into what became the Marxist formula: "from each according to his ability, to each according to his need". Along these lines, justice had an egalitarian form while retaining male domination, and defining justice for slaves as paternalistic care. Wogaman says that these issues will "continue to occupy Christian ethics for years to come".

==== Capital punishment ====
Capital punishment in the world; click to enlarge and see.

In Christian ethics of the twenty-first century, capital punishment has become controversial, and there are Christian ethicists on both sides. Biblical ethicist Christopher Marshall says there are about 20 offenses that carry the death penalty in the Old Testament. He adds that "contemporary standards tend to view these laws of capital punishment as cavalier toward human life", however, the ancient ethic of "covenantal community" suggests the value of life was as much communal as individual. In contemporary society, capital punishment can be seen as respect for the worth of the victim by calling for the equal cost to the offender; it can also be seen as respect for the offender, treating them as free agents responsible for their own choices who must bear the responsibility for their acts just as any citizen must.

According to Jeffrey Reiman, the argument against capital punishment is not based on the offender's guilt or innocence, but on the belief that killing is wrong, and is therefore never a permissible act, even for the state. G. C. Hanks argues against the death penalty by saying it "is not effective in fighting crime, costs more than life sentences, reinforces poverty and racism, and causes innocent persons to be executed". He argues that it interferes with creating a just and humane society, negatively impacts the families of victims, and race issues, and can be seen as "cruel and unusual punishment". These arguments leave retribution as the primary supporting argument in favor of capital punishment, and Professor Michael L. Radelet says retribution's moral base is a problem for a Christian ethic.

The Catholic Church has historically taught that capital punishment is permissible, but during the twentieth century, popes began to argue that it could not be justified under present-day circumstances as there were other ways to protect society from offenders. Capital punishment has been abolished in many countries, and Radelet predicts that increasing opposition from religious leaders will lead to its abolition in America as well.

=== Relationships ===
In most ancient religions the primary focus is on humankind's relationship to nature, whereas in the Christian ethic, the primary focus is on relationship with God as the "absolute moral personality". This is demonstrated as a focus on relationship itself as a primary concern in all Christian ethics.

==== Neighbors ====
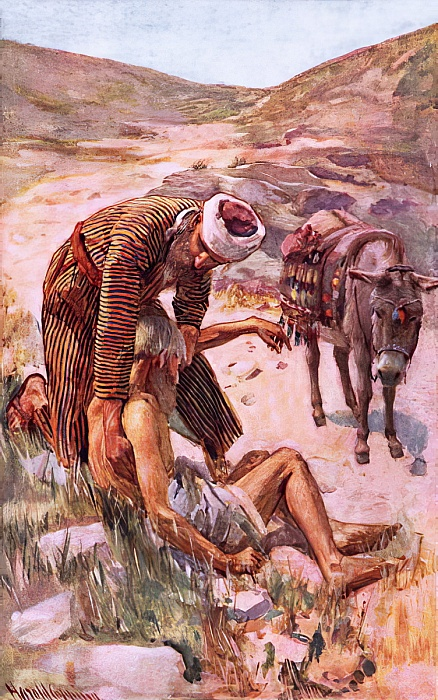
The good Samaritan, Harold Copping

Traditional Christian ethics recognizes the command to "love thy neighbor" as one of the two primary commands called the "greatest commands" by Jesus. This reflects an attitude that aims at promoting another person's good in what Stanley J. Grenz calls an "enlightened unselfishness". When the Pharisee asked Jesus: "Who is my neighbor?" (Luke 10:29), Grenz says the questioner intended to limit the circle of those to whom this obligation was due, but Jesus responded by reversing the direction of the question into "To whom can I be a neighbor?". In the parable of the "Good Samaritan", the use of a racially despised and religiously rejected individual as an example of the good, defines a neighbor as anyone who responds to those in need.

==== Women ====
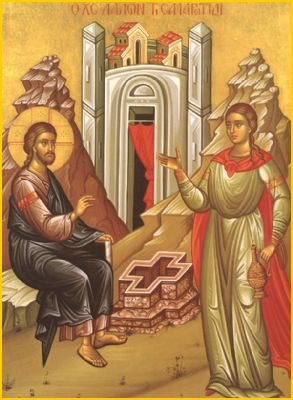
The Samaritan woman, meeting Jesus by the well. Orthodox icon

There are four primary views in Christian ethics on the roles of women. Christian feminism defines itself as a school of Christian theology which seeks to advance and understand the equality of men and women. Christian egalitarianism argues that the Bible supports "mutual submission". These views reflect the belief that Jesus held women personally responsible for their own behavior: the woman at the well (John 4:16–18), the woman taken in adultery (John 8:10–11), and the sinful woman who anointed his feet (Luke 7:44–50), are all dealt with as having the personal freedom, and enough self-determination, to choose their own repentance and forgiveness. The New Testament names many women among the followers of Jesus as well as naming women in positions of leadership in the early church. Biblical patriarchy upholds the view that 1 Corinthians 14:34–35, 1 Timothy 2:11–15, and 1 Corinthians 11:2–16 represent a hierarchy of male over female authority. Complementarianism contains aspects of both views seeing women as "ontologically equal; functionally different".

Before the twelfth and thirteenth centuries, ordination was dedication to a particular role or ministry, and in this capacity, women in the church were ordained up until the 1200s. When theologians of this medieval period circumscribed the seven sacraments, they changed the vocabulary and gave the sacraments exclusively to male priests. In the nineteenth century, rights for women brought a wide variety of responses from Christian ethics with the Bible featuring prominently on both sides ranging from traditional to feminist. In the late twentieth century, the ordination of women became a controversial issue. Linda Woodhead states that, "Of the many threats that Christianity has to face in modern times, gender equality is one of the most serious."

===== Marriage and divorce =====
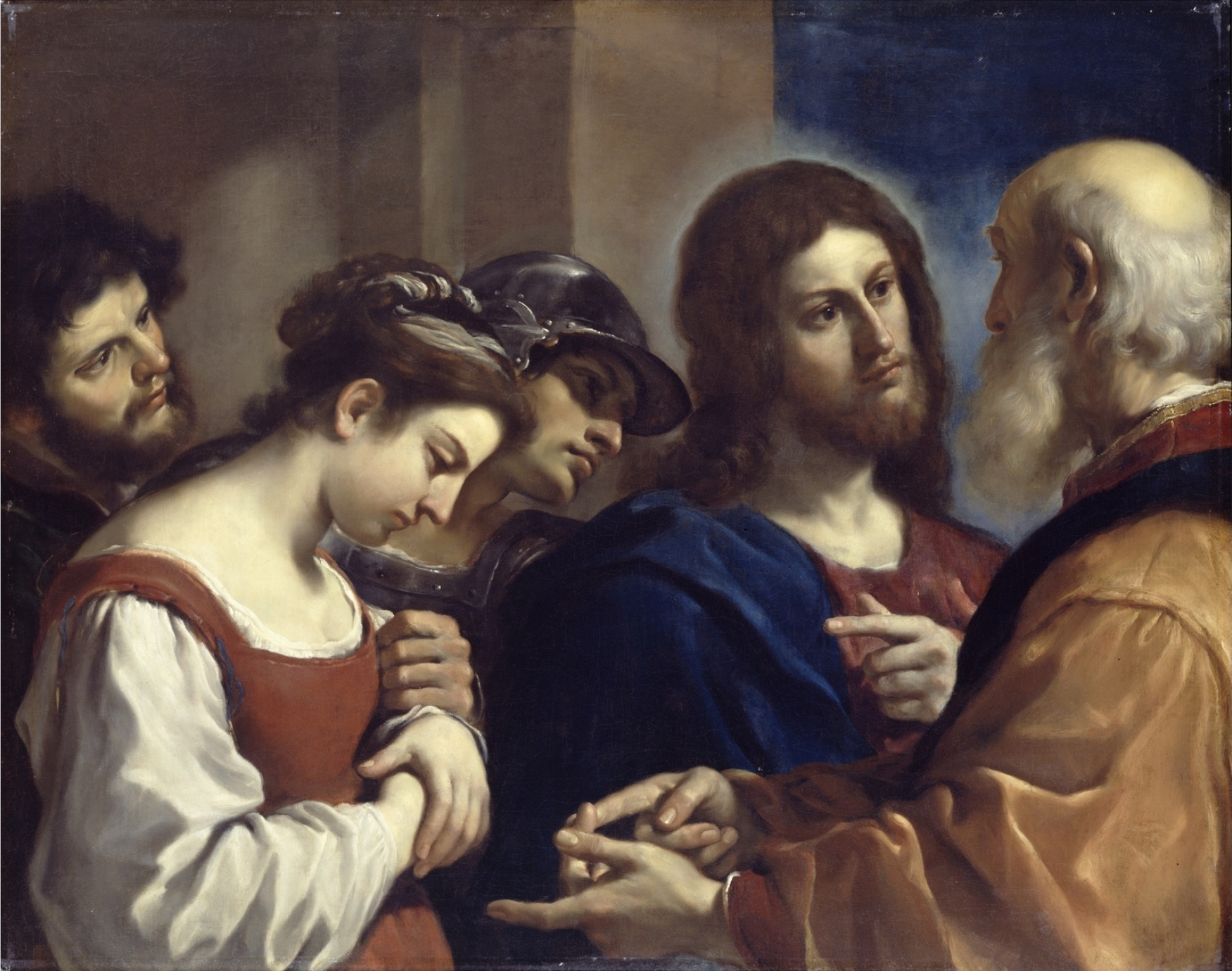
Christ with the Woman Taken in Adultery, by Guercino, 1621. Depicts Jesus and the woman taken in adultery

According to professor of Religion Barbara J. MacHaffie, the early church fathers treated married life with some sensitivity, as a relationship of love and trust and mutual service, contrasting it with non-Christian marriage as one where passions rule a "domineering husband and a lusty wife". In the synoptic Gospels, Jesus is seen as emphasizing the permanence of marriage, as well as its integrity: "Because of your hardness of heart, Moses allowed you to divorce your wives, but from the beginning it was not so." Restriction on divorce was based on the necessity of protecting the woman and her position in society, not necessarily in a religious context, but in an economic context. Paul concurred but added an exception for abandonment by an unbelieving spouse.

Augustine wrote his treatise on divorce and marriage, De adulterinis coniuigiis, in which he asserts couples may only divorce on the ground of fornication (adultery) in 419/21, even though marriage did not become one of the seven sacraments of the church until the thirteenth century. Though Augustine confesses in later works (Retractationes) that these issues were complicated and that he felt he had failed to address them completely, adultery was the standard necessary for legal divorce until the modern day. The twenty-first century Catholic Church still prohibits divorce, but permits annulment (a finding that the marriage was never valid) under a narrow set of circumstances. The Eastern Orthodox Church permits divorce and remarriage in church in certain circumstances. Most Protestant churches discourage divorce except as a last resort but do not actually prohibit it through church doctrine, often providing divorce recovery programs as well.

==== Sexuality and celibacy ====
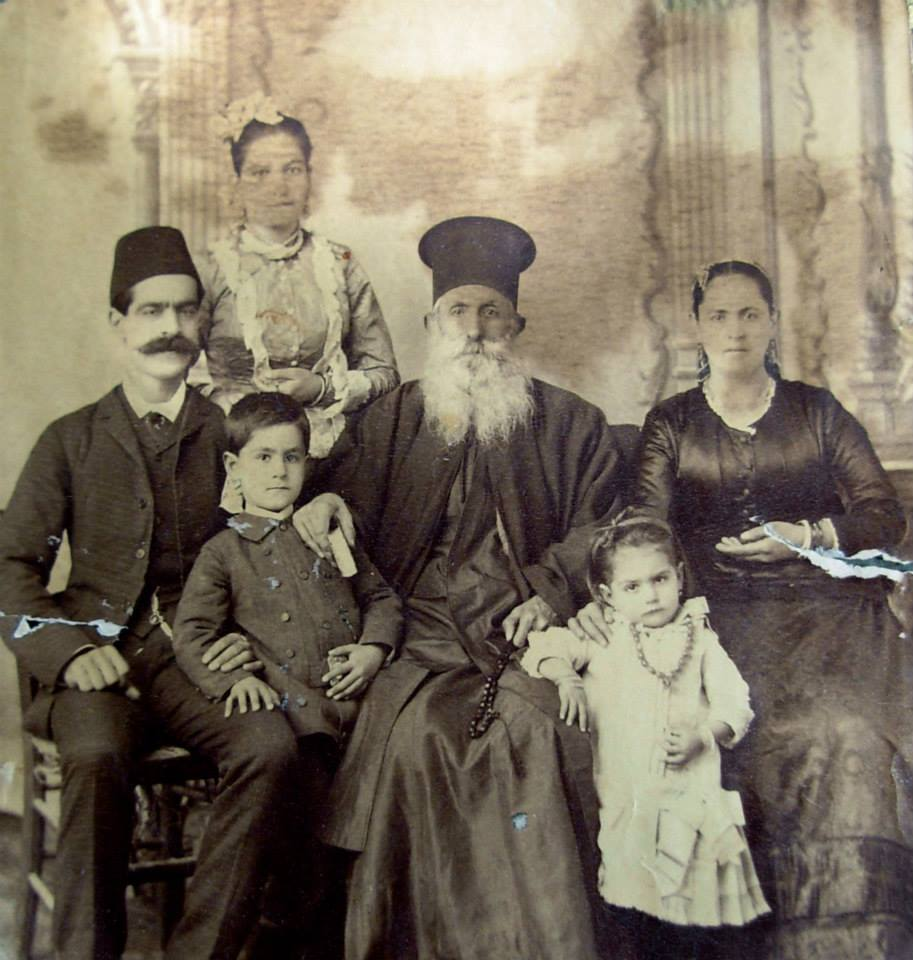
Married Eastern Orthodox priest from Jerusalem with his family (three generations), c. 1893

Lisa Sowle Cahill refers to sex and gender as the most difficult topics in new studies of Christian ethics. As "the rigidity and stringency of ...traditional moral representation has collided head-on with historicized or 'postmodern' interpretations of moral systems", Cowell says tradition has acquired new forms of patriarchy, sexism, homophobia and hypocrisy. Feminist critics have suggested that part of what drives traditional sexual morality is the social control of women, yet within postmodern western societies the "attempt to reclaim moral autonomy through sexual freedom" has produced a loss of all sense of sexual boundaries. Cahill concludes that, in contemporary Western culture, "Personal autonomy and mutual consent are almost the only criteria now commonly accepted in governing our sexual behavior."

The gospel requires that all relationships be reconfigured by new life within the community, yet the New Testament has no systematic investigation into all facets of any moral topic, no definitive guidance for the many variations of moral problems that exist in the twenty-first century. According to Lisa Sowle Cahill, "Traditional societies place sex and gender in the context of community, family and parenthood; modern societies respect reciprocity, intimacy and gender equality." Cowell says, New Testament authors challenge that which perpetuates sin, and encourage the transformation that "embodies the reign of God".

While Jesus made reference to some that have made themselves eunuchs for the kingdom of heaven, there is no commandment in the New Testament that priests must be unmarried and celibate. During the first three or four centuries, no law was promulgated prohibiting clerical marriage. Celibacy was a matter of choice for bishops, priests, and deacons. In the twenty-first century, the Roman Catholic Church teachings on celibacy uphold it for monastics and some priests. Protestantism has rejected the requirement of celibacy for pastors, and they see it primarily as a temporary abstinence until the joys of a future marriage. Some modern day evangelicals desire a more positive understanding of celibacy that is more like Paul's: focused on devotion to God rather than a future marriage or a lifelong vow to the Church.

==== Slavery and race ====
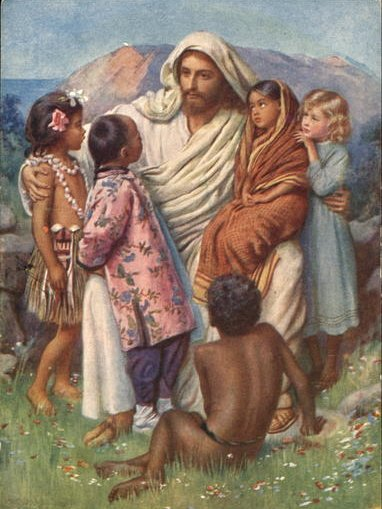
The Hope of the World, Harold Copping, 1915

In the twenty-first century, Christian organizations reject slavery, but historically Christian views have varied, embracing both support and opposition. Slavery was harsh and inflexible in the first century when Christian ethics began, and slaves were vulnerable to abuse, yet neither Jesus nor Paul ordered the abolition of slavery. At this time, the Christian view was that morals were a matter of obedience to the ordained hierarchy of God and men. Paul was opposed to the political and social order of the age in which he lived, but his letters offer no plan for reform beyond working toward the apocalyptic return of Christ. He did indirectly articulate a social ideal through the Pauline virtues, the "faith, hope and love" of his First Epistle to the Corinthians, by designating love as the highest of all virtues; and he indirectly undermined the mistreatment of women, children and slaves through his teachings on marriage and through his own personal lifestyle. Stanley K. Stowers, professor of religious studies, asserts the view that Paul's refusal to marry and set up a household that would require slaves, and his insistence on being self-supporting, was a model followed by many after him that "structurally attacked slavery by attacking its social basis, the household, and its continuity through inheritance from master to master".

In the early 4th century, Roman law, such as the Novella 142 of Justinian, gave Christian bishops (and priests) the power to free slaves by a ritual in a church performed by the bishop or priest involved. It is not known if baptism was required before this ritual. Several early figures, such as Saint Patrick (415–493), himself having been enslaved as an adolescent, and Acacius of Amida (400–425), made personal sacrifices to free slaves. Bishop Ambrose (337–397 AD), while not openly advocating abolition, ordered that church property be sold to get the money to buy and free slaves. Gregory of Nyssa (c. 335–394) went further and stated opposition to all slavery as a practice. Later Saint Eligius (588-650) used his vast wealth to purchase British and Saxon slaves in groups of 50 and 100 in order to set them free.

By the time of Charlemagne (742–814), while Muslims were coming onto the scene "as major players in a large-scale slave trade" of Africans, Alice Rio, lecturer in medieval European history, says that slavery had become almost non-existent in the West. Rio says criticism of the trade in Christian slaves was not new, but at this time, opposition began to get wider support, seeing all those involved in the trade as what Rio calls "symbols of barbarity". Slavery in Africa existed for six centuries before the arrival of the Portuguese (1500s) and the opening of the Atlantic slave trade in the West. Economics drove its development, but historian Herbert S. Klein adds that the trade was abolished in the U.S., Britain and Europe while it was still profitable and important to those respective economies. Early abolitionist literature viewed the abolition of slavery as a moral crusade. Churches became vital parts of that effort with abolitionists, reformers, and supporters of slavery all using Christian ethics to justify their relative positions.

Racial violence over the last decades of the twentieth century and the early decades of the twenty first demonstrate how troubled issues involving race remain. Paul Harvey says that, in the 1960s, "The religious power of the civil rights movement transformed the American conception of race." The social power of the religious Right responded in the 70s by recapturing and recasting many evangelical concepts into political terms including support of racial separation. Since then, Harvey says the prosperity gospel, which has become a dominant force in American religious life, has translated evangelical themes into "a modern idiom" of "self-empowerment, racial reconciliation, and a 'positive confession'", (which Harvey defines as an amalgam of positive thinking, evangelical tradition and New Thought). The prosperity gospel's multi-cultural demographic may suggest much about the future of Christian ethics and race.

=== Bioethics ===
Bioethics is the study of the life and health issues raised by modern technology that attempts to discover what medical ethicist Scott B. Rae and Christian ethicist Paul M. Cox call "normative guidelines built on sound moral foundations". This is necessary because the moral questions surrounding new medical technologies have become complex, important and difficult. David VanDrunen, professor of systematic theology and Christian ethics, opines that with the tremendous benefits of medical advances, have come the "eerie forebodings of a future that is less humane, not more". In what Rae and Cox describe as "a best selling exposé", Jeff Lyon in Playing God in the Nursery charged physicians with "prematurely withdrawing life-sustaining technology from seriously ill newborns". Remedies for infertility enable researchers to create embryos as a disposable resource for stem cells. Scripture offers no direct instruction for when a right to life becomes a right to death.

The Catholic bio–ethic can be seen as one that rests on natural law. Moral decision making affirms the basic "goods" or values of life, which is built on the concept of a hierarchy of values, with some values more basic than others. For example, Catholic ethics supports self-determination but with limits from other values, say, if a patient chose a course of action that would no longer be in their best interests, then outside intervention would be morally acceptable. If there is conflict over how to apply conflicting values, Rae and Cox say that then a proportionate reasoned decision would be made. This is defined as including values such as preservation of life, human freedom, and lessening pain and suffering while also recognizing that not all values can be realized in these situations.

The Protestant Christian ethic is rooted in the belief that agape love is its central value, and that this love is expressed in the pursuit of good for other persons. This ethic as a social policy may use natural law and other sources of knowledge, but in the Protestant Christian ethic, apape love must remain the controlling virtue that guides principles and practices. This approach determines the moral choice by what is the most love-embodying action within a situation. Rae and Cox conclude that, in this view, actions that can be seen as wrong, when they are acts of maximal love toward another, become right.

==== Genetic engineering ====
New technologies of prenatal testing, DNA therapy and other genetic engineering help many, yet Wogaman asserts they also offer ways in which "science and technology can become instruments of human oppression". Manipulating the genetic code can prevent inheritable diseases and also produce, for those rich enough, designer babies "destined to be taller, faster and smarter than their classmates". Genetic technologies can correct genetic defects, but how one defines defect is often subjective. Parents might have certain expectations about gender, for example, and consider anything else as defective. In some Third World countries where "women have far fewer rights and female children are viewed as liabilities with bleak futures", genetic testing is widely used for sex selection, and some couples have terminated otherwise healthy pregnancies because the child was not the desired gender. Research into the gene for homosexuality could lead to prenatal tests that predict it, which could be particularly problematic in countries where homosexuals are considered defective and have no legal protection. Such intervention is problematic morally, and has been characterized as "playing God".

The general view of genetic engineering by Christian ethicists is stated by theologian John Feinburg. He reasons that since diseases are the result of sin coming into the world, and because Christian ethics asserts that Jesus himself began the process of conquering sin and evil through his healings and resurrection, "if there is a condition in a human being (whether physical or psychological) [understood as disease], and if there is something that genetic technology could do to address that problem, then use of this technology would be acceptable. In effect, we would be using this technology to fight sin and its consequences".

==== Abortion ====
Stanley Rudman boils down the abortion debate by saying that "if one says that the central issue between conservatives and liberals in the abortion question is whether the fetus is a person, it is clear that the dispute may be either about what properties a thing must have in order to be a person, in order to have the right to life – a moral question – or about whether a fetus at a given stage of development... possesses the properties in question" – a biological question. Most philosophers have picked out the capacity for rationality, autonomy and self-awareness to describe personhood, but there are at least four possible definitions: in order to be a true person, a subject must have interests; possess rationality; be capable of action; and/or have the capacity for self-consciousness. A fetus fails to possess at least one and possibly all of these, and so it can be argued that the fetus is not a true person.

Rudman points out how this approach becomes a slippery slope, as the argument can then be used to justify infanticide, which is not only not generally supported, but is defined by society as a crime. "Without assuming the Christian moral framework" concerning the sanctity of life, "the grounds for not killing persons do not apply to newborn infants. Neither classical utilitarianism nor preferential utilitarianism ... offer good reasons why infanticide should necessarily be wrong". Moral philosopher Peter Singer in Practical Ethics describes the Christian argument as "It is wrong to kill an innocent human being; a fetus is an innocent human being" therefore it is wrong to kill a fetus. Rudman asserts the Christian ethic is more than a simple syllogism, it is "a narrative that includes the child in God's family, takes into account the entire context surrounding its birth, including the other lives involved, and seeks harmony with God's redeeming activity through Christ. It includes confidence in God's ability to sustain and direct those who put their trust in him."

==== Alcohol and addiction ====
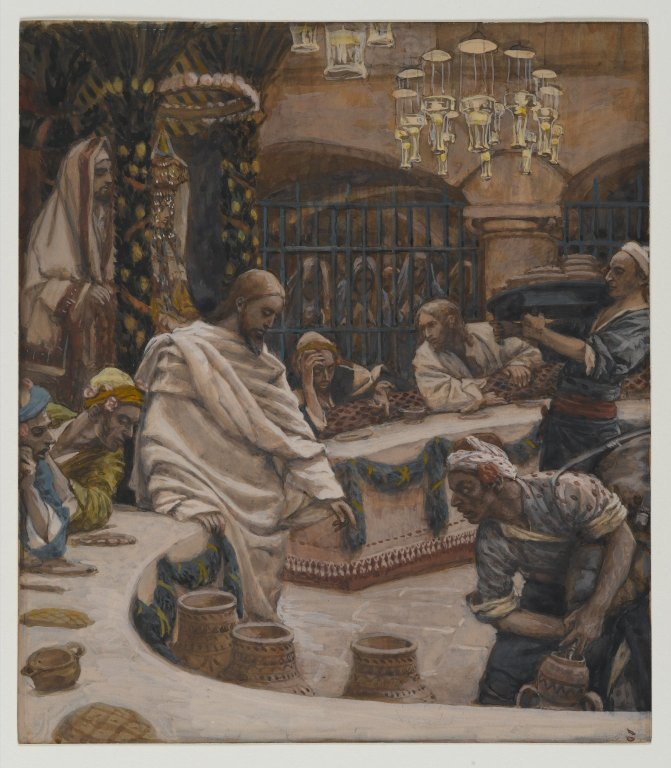
The Marriage at Cana (Les noces de Cana) by James Tissot, 19th century

The Christian ethic concerning alcohol has fluctuated from one generation to the next. In the nineteenth century, the largest proportion of Christians in all denominations resolved to remain alcohol free. While it is true that some contemporary Christians, including Pentecostals, Baptists and Methodists, continue to believe one ought to abstain from alcohol, the majority of contemporary Christians have determined that moderation is the better approach.

Ethicist Christopher C. H. Cook asserts that the primary question for Christian ethics revolves around the fact that alcohol misuse is a "contemporary social problem of enormous economic significance, which exacts a high toll in human suffering". All persons must, directly and indirectly, determine their ethical response to alcohol's enormous popularity and widespread acceptance in the face of its social and medical harm. The Christian ethic takes seriously the power of addiction to "hold people captive, and the need for an experience of a gracious 'Higher Power' as the basis for finding freedom".

==== Physician-assisted suicide ====
Physician Daniel P. Sulmasy lists arguments against physician-assisted suicide (PAS): those advocating it might do so for selfish/monetary reasons rather than out of concern for the patient; that suicide devalues life; that limits on the practice erode over time and it can become over-used; that palliative care and modern therapeutics have become better at managing pain, so other options are often available; and that PAS can damage a physician's integrity and undermine the trust patients place in them to heal and not harm.

In Christian ethics, responses to assisted suicide are rooted in belief in personal autonomy and love. This remains problematic as the arguments commonly used to defend PAS are concepts of justice and mercy that can be described as a minimalist understanding of the terms. A minimal concept of justice respects autonomy, protects individual rights, and attempts to guarantee that each individual has the right to act according to their own preferences, but humans are not fully independent or autonomous; humans live in community with others. This minimalist view does not recognize the significance of covenant relationships in the process of decision making. Empathy toward another's suffering tells us to do something but not what to do. Killing as an act of mercy is a minimalist understanding of mercy that is not sufficient to prevent unethical acts. Battin, Rhodes and Silvers conclude that the Christian ethic asserts "life and its flourishing are gifts of God, but they are not the ultimate good, and neither are suffering and death the ultimate evils. One need not use all of one's resources against them. One need only act with integrity in the face of them."

==== Persistent vegetative state ====
VanDrunen explains that modern technology has treatments that enable a persistent vegetative state (PVS) which has led to questions of euthanasia and the controversial distinction between killing and letting die. PVS patients are in a permanent state of unconsciousness due to the loss of higher brain function; the brain stem remains alive, so they breathe, but swallowing is a voluntary reflex, so they must receive artificial nutrition and hydration (ANH) to survive. These patients can be without other health problems and live for extended periods. Most ethicists conclude it is morally sound to decline ANH for such a patient, but some argue otherwise based on defining when death occurs.

=== Environmental ethics ===
The twenty-first century has seen an increased concern over human impacts on the environment, including global warming, pollution, soil erosion, deforestation, species extinction, overpopulation, and overconsumption. There appears to be a strong scientific consensus that industrialized civilization has emitted enough carbon dioxide into the atmosphere to create a greenhouse effect causing global warming, yet debate rages primarily over the economic effects of limiting development. Michael Northcott, professor of ethics, says both issues will have to be dealt with: the reorientation of modern society toward recognizing the biological limits of the planet will not occur without a related quest for justice and the common good. Wogaman argues that the "doctrine of creation creates a presumption in favor of environmental conservation". Francis Schaeffer, evangelical theologian, said: "We are called to treat nature personally." Northcott says the incarnation shows God loves material reality, not just spirit. Recent studies indicate American Christians have become polarized over these issues. "For liberal Christians, the call to be a better steward is urgent, unequivocal, of the highest priority, and not to be subject to negotiation or compromise. For conservative Christians, however, the commitment to stewardship has become increasingly hemmed in with certain reservations and qualifications... Today, the official position of Southern Baptists, and of other conservative Christians, is indistinguishable from that of secular conservatives in the climate denial movement".

==== Animal rights ====
The debate over the inhumane treatment of animals revolves around the issue of personhood and animal rights. In the Christian ethic, personhood is related to the nature of God, who is understood in terms of community and inter-relationship. Within this view, the nature of moral community is not limited to a community of equals: humans are not equal to God yet have community with him. On this basis, Rudman argues that animals should be included in the moral community without being required to be regarded as persons. He says that, based on convictions which include the future transformation and liberation of all creation, a Christian view is obligated to take animal welfare seriously. Therefore, he concludes that the Christian ethic sees an emphasis on animal welfare as a better approach than the use of concepts of personhood and divine rights for addressing inhumane treatment of animals. Northcott adds that the Christian ethic, with its concepts of redemption of all physical reality and its manifestation of responsible stewardship in community and relation to others, is "a vital corrective to modern individualism which devalues both human and non-human distinctiveness".

== Criticism ==
Some philosophers have described Christian ethics as intolerant, immoral, repressive, and infantilizing. According to Ronald Preston, the first of those four objections carries, historically seen, the most weight. According to Wayne A. Leys, modern ethics (e.g. by Immanuel Kant) was born because modern philosophers rejected traditional morality. Kant wanted solid, rational foundations for morality, not the weak foundation of a religion going into a decline. And he did not like that Christianity kept adults under "self-imposed nonage". Kant did not completely say farewell to Christian ethics, that is why Friedrich Nietzsche called him "a theologian in disguise". E.g. Kant did not reject God, the human soul, or the duty to God. By declaring that God and the soul are incognoscible he really meant insulating them from rational criticism.

== See also ==
- Aristotelian ethics
- Beatitudes
- Catholic peace traditions
- Choose the right
- Christian Morals
- Christian pacifism
- Christian philosophy
- Christian values
- Christian vegetarianism
- Christian views on the Old Covenant
- Council of Jerusalem
- Ethics in religion
  - Buddhist ethics
  - Islamic ethics
  - Jewish ethics
- Ethics in the Bible
- Good works
- Great Commandment
- Jesus in Christianity
- Plowshares movement
- Problem of Hell
- Religious views on love
- Swords into ploughshares
- Theonomy
- Turning the other cheek
- Works of mercy
