= Nature Red in Tooth and Claw (book) =

2008 book by Michael J. Murray

- First edition cover
- Author: Michael J. Murray
- Language: English
- Subjects: Animal theology; philosophy of religion; problem of evil; theism; wild animal suffering
- Genre: Theology
- Published: 2008
- Publisher: Oxford University Press
- Publication place: United Kingdom
- Media type: Print (hardcover)
- Pages: x + 209
- ISBN: 978-0-19-923727-2
- OCLC: 5105006233

Nature Red in Tooth and Claw: Theism and the Problem of Animal Suffering is a 2008 book by philosopher Michael J. Murray which examines wild animal suffering as a problem in animal theology and philosophy of religion. Murray considers animal suffering throughout evolutionary history as a form of natural evil and examines its implications for theism and the problem of evil. The title refers to the phrase "nature, red in tooth and claw" from Alfred, Lord Tennyson's poem In Memoriam A.H.H..

== Summary ==
Murray describes the problem addressed in the book as the "Darwinian problem of evil": the suffering of non-human animals produced by the processes of evolution and natural selection. He treats this as a version of the evidential problem of evil, since the scale, duration and apparent pointlessness of animal suffering may be taken as evidence against the existence of an omnipotent, omniscient and wholly good God.

The book distinguishes between theodicies, which try to identify God's actual reasons for permitting evil, and defences, which try to show that theism is not defeated by the evidence. Murray rejects the attempt to give a full theodicy for animal suffering. Instead, he develops what he calls a Causa Dei defence, a case made on God's behalf which aims to show that the evidence does not justify the conclusion that animal suffering is gratuitous.

Murray considers several possible explanations. One group of arguments, described by Engel as neo-Cartesian, questions whether animals possess the kind of phenomenal consciousness required for pain. Other arguments connect animal suffering with the Fall, including the possibility that natural evil is caused by fallen non-human agents. Murray also considers whether pain may benefit animals by helping them preserve their bodily integrity, and whether the regular operation of natural laws in a universe moving from chaos to order could justify the suffering produced by evolutionary processes.

The book concludes that the problem of animal suffering does not make theism irrational, although Murray does not claim to have shown why God actually permits such suffering. He also argues that animal pain may not be morally equivalent to human pain, while warning that uncertainty about animal consciousness should not lead humans to treat animals as though they cannot suffer.

== Publication history ==
The book was published in hardcover by Oxford University Press in 2008.

== Reception ==
The philosopher Mylan Engel Jr. described the book as a useful text for philosophy of religion courses, particularly those on the problem of evil. Engel argued, however, that Murray's proposed defences fail by Murray's own standards. He rejected the neo-Cartesian arguments on the grounds that there is strong behavioural, anatomical and physiological evidence that many animals feel pain. He also criticised the appeal to Satan, the claim that animal pain is necessary for preserving animal life, and the appeal to a law-governed universe moving from chaos to order. Engel concluded that the book is instructive because it shows "just how bleak the theist's prospects are for handling this enduring challenge to the rationality of theistic belief", but raised the concern that Murray's treatment may lead readers to underestimate animal suffering.

Joseph J. Lynch argued that the Causa Dei defence in the book "may unjustifiably minimize the significance of animal suffering or simply explain it away". He nevertheless described the book as comprehensive and said that it would provoke discussion, even if it did not "solve the problem of God and animal pain".

T. J. Mawson argued that the book is better understood as a defence of theism in light of the evidence than as a theodicy. Mawson suggested that the result of the book is a verdict of "case not proven" on the problem of animal suffering.

C. R. Dodsworth praised the book, calling it "carefully argued, historically grounded and insightful". Gary Chartier also reviewed the book positively. He described it as the "only book-length study in English of theodicy and animal suffering in the philosophy of religion" and wrote that "Murray has set the standard for the discussion of animal pain as a problem in theodicy".

C. Robert Mesle criticised the book for focusing on a single traditional conception of God and for not engaging with theologians who hold different views of God. He also argued that the book's standards of rationality were too low and that this weakened its contribution to broader philosophical and theological inquiry.

== See also ==
- Evolutionary theodicy § Natural evil and animal suffering
- Predation problem
