= The Mask of Enlightenment =

1995 book by Stanley Rosen

The Mask of Enlightenment: Nietzsche’s Zarathustra
- Author: Stanley Rosen
- Language: English
- Subject: Thus Spoke Zarathustra
- Publisher: Cambridge University Press (1st ed), Yale University Press (2nd ed)
- Publication date: 1995 (1st ed), 2004 (2nd ed)
- Publication place: United States
- Media type: Print
- Pages: 288
- ISBN: 9780300145915

The Mask of Enlightenment: Nietzsche’s Zarathustra is a 1995 book by Stanley Rosen with a foreword by Michael Allen Gillespie in which the author provides a detailed commentary on Nietzsche's Thus Spoke Zarathustra.

The book has been reviewed by Aaron Ridley, Martin Liebscher, Jonathan Salem-Wiseman, and Kathleen Marie Higgins.
