= Stanley Rosen =

American philosopher

- Born: Stanley Howard Rosen; July 29, 1929; Cleveland, Ohio, U.S.
- Died: May 4, 2014 (aged 84); Philadelphia, Pennsylvania, U.S.

Education
- Education: University of Chicago (PhD)
- Thesis: Spinoza's Argument for Political Freedom (1955)
- Doctoral advisor: Leo Strauss

Philosophical work
- Era: 20th-century philosophy
- Region: Western philosophy
- School: Continental philosophy
- Institutions: Boston University
- Doctoral students: Alan White
- Notable students: Robert B. Pippin
- Main interests: Metaphysics, political philosophy

Stanley Howard Rosen (July 29, 1929 – May 4, 2014) was an American philosopher who was Borden Parker Bowne Professor of Philosophy and professor emeritus at Boston University. His research and teaching focused on the fundamental questions of philosophy and on the most important figures of its history, from Plato to Heidegger.

== Biography ==
Rosen was born in Cleveland, Ohio. His family was of Jewish heritage. He studied under Leo Strauss and, under Strauss's auspices, with Alexandre Kojève in Paris. He did his postdoctoral work at the American School of Classical Studies at Athens, and became Evan Pugh Professor of philosophy at Penn State University and then Borden Parker Bowne Professor of Philosophy at Boston University. He has held the Companys Lectureship at the University of Barcelona, the Cardinal Mercier Lectureship at University of Leuven, the Priestley Lectureship at the University of Toronto, and the Gilson Lectureship at the Institut Catholique in Paris. He served as president of the Metaphysical Society of America in 1991.

Rosen's first two books, a study of Plato's Symposium and Nihilism: A Philosophical Essay, represent his abiding concerns. On the one hand he continuously returned to the roots of the philosophical tradition, in particular to Plato, and, on the other, he thought through modern and postmodern philosophy by confronting their most powerful representatives. The most notable feature of this engagement was the justice done to the two main strands of contemporary philosophy, the continental and analytic movements, represented by their most influential members, Heidegger and Wittgenstein, as preparation for Rosen's criticism and positive proposals.

One of the central themes of Rosen's work is the claim that the extraordinary discourses of philosophy have no other basis than the intelligent understanding of the features of ordinary life or human existence. This theme was given an in-depth treatment in his 2002 work, The Elusiveness of the Ordinary.

Rosen married his wife, Francoise, in 1955; they had three children and four grandchildren.

== Bibliography ==
- Rosen, Stanley (2013). The Idea of Hegel's "Science of Logic". University of Chicago Press. doi:10.7208/chicago/9780226065915.001.0001. ISBN 978-0-226-71764-7.
- Essays in Philosophy. Ancient (St. Augustine's Press, 2013)
- Essays in Philosophy. Modern (St. Augustine's Press, 2013)
- Plato's Republic: A Study (Yale University Press, 2005)
- The Mask of Enlightenment: Nietzsche's Zarathustra, 2nd edition (Yale University Press, 2004)
- Hermeneutics as Politics, 2nd edition (Yale University Press, 2003)
- The Elusiveness of the Ordinary (Yale University Press, 2002)
- Metaphysics in Ordinary Language (Yale University Press, 1999)
- The Mask of Enlightenment: Nietzsche's Zarathustra (Cambridge University Press, 1995)
- Plato's Statesman: The Web of Politics (Yale University Press, 1995)
- The Question of Being: A Reversal of Heidegger (Yale University Press, 1993)
- The Ancients and the Moderns (Yale University Press, 1989)
- The Quarrel Between Philosophy and Poetry (Routledge, 1988)
- Hermeneutics as Politics (Oxford University Press, 1987)
- Plato's Sophist (Yale University Press, 1983)
- The Limits of Analysis (Basic Books, 1980)
- G. W. F. Hegel: An Introduction to the Science of Wisdom (Yale University Press, 1974)
- Nihilism: a Philosophical Essay (Yale University Press, 1969)
- Plato's Symposium (Yale University Press, 1967)

== See also ==
- American philosophy
- List of American philosophers
