= Michael J. Murray =

American philosopher

Education
- Education: University of Notre Dame (MA, PhD), Franklin and Marshall College (BA)

Philosophical work
- Era: 21st-century philosophy
- Region: Western philosophy
- Institutions: Franklin and Marshall College, Arthur Vining Davis Foundation, John Templeton Foundation
- Main interests: philosophy of religion

Michael J. Murray is an American philosopher and the President of Arthur Vining Davis Foundation. He previously taught at Franklin and Marshall College where he was the Arthur and Katherine Shadek Humanities Professor of Philosophy. He is known for his works on philosophy of religion.

== Books ==
- Divine Evil?: The Moral Character of the God of Abraham, edited with Michael Bergmann and Michael C. Rea, Oxford University Press, 2011
- Nature Red in Tooth and Claw: Theism and the Problem of Animal Suffering, Oxford University Press, 2008
- Philosophy of Religion (Cambridge University Press, with Michael Rea)
- The Believing Primate: Scientific, Philosophical, and Theological Reflections on the Origin of Religion (Oxford University Press, with Jeffrey Schloss)
- Predestination and Election (Yale University Press)
