= Theory of everything (philosophy) =

Ultimate description of reality

In philosophy, a theory of everything (ToE) is an ultimate, all-encompassing explanation or description of nature or reality. It aspires to answer the most fundamental questions: why there is anything at all, why reality is intelligible, and why the laws of nature take the form they do. The term, borrowed from physics, where the search for a final unifying framework is ongoing, has been adopted by philosophers to discuss both the viability of such a project and the properties a completed explanation would need to possess. A philosophical ToE is not a single equation but a comprehensive conceptual structure that integrates metaphysics, epistemology, ethics, and the philosophy of science into a coherent whole.

== Historical precursors ==
The ambition to construct an all-embracing system of thought is as old as philosophy itself. In ancient Greece, Plato's theory of Forms and Aristotle's metaphysical and scientific treatises attempted to account for the totality of being. Plato's vision of a transcendent realm of perfect archetypes underlying the visible world and Aristotle's systematic categorization of substances, causes, and purposes set the pattern for later system-builders.

During the Hellenistic period, the Stoics developed a complete system encompassing logic, physics, and ethics, in which the universe was a living rational whole governed by the logos. Plotinus' Neoplatonism offered a grand metaphysical hierarchy emanating from the One. These ancient systems share the conviction that human reason can grasp the ultimate principles of reality.

In the medieval period, thinkers like Thomas Aquinas integrated Aristotelianism with Christian theology, producing what they regarded as a complete account of God, creation, and human nature. The Scholastic tradition aimed at a summa of all knowledge, a total system harmonizing faith and reason.

The early modern period (17th and 18th centuries) saw the rise of rationalist system-building, often equating systematic completeness with the power of a priori reason. Descartes' dualism sought to derive the fundamental principles of mind and matter from clear and distinct ideas. Spinoza's monism, presented in geometric order in his Ethics, argued that a single substance, God or Nature, unfolds according to necessary laws. Leibniz's monadology posited an infinity of simple, non-interacting substances pre-harmonized by God, offering a complete account of reality from the simplest elements upward.

In the 19th century, Georg Wilhelm Friedrich Hegel's absolute idealism attempted to demonstrate that all of reality is the historical and logical development of Spirit coming to know itself. Hegel's system was perhaps the most ambitious ToE yet, purporting to derive the necessary structure of reality from pure logic. Arthur Schopenhauer offered a competing world-system based on the metaphysical Will. Later, Herbert Spencer attempted to synthesize biology, psychology, sociology, and ethics under the principle of evolution, creating what he called a "synthetic philosophy".

Alfred North Whitehead's process philosophy in the early 20th century provided another large-scale metaphysical system, one in which becoming and relation are fundamental rather than static substance. Whitehead's Process and Reality aims to be a comprehensive cosmology, explaining everything from quantum physics to the nature of God. Each of these thinkers attempted, in their own way, to answer all the important questions in a single, interconnected framework.

The later 20th century saw a revival of systematic metaphysics in the analytical tradition through the work of philosophers like Peter Strawson (descriptive metaphysics) and David Lewis (modal realism). Strawson's Individuals (1959) attempts to map the most general features of our conceptual scheme, while Lewis's On the Plurality of Worlds (1986) offers a comprehensive modal realism that explains possibility, necessity, causation, and mind in terms of concrete possible worlds. While these works did not always present themselves as full-fledged ToEs, they shared the ambition of providing comprehensive frameworks for understanding reality.

== Comprehensive philosophical systems ==
The "system building" style of metaphysics attempts to answer all the important questions in a coherent way, providing a complete picture of the world. The philosophies of Plato and Aristotle could be said to be early examples of comprehensive systems. In the early modern period (17th and 18th centuries), the system-building scope of philosophy is often linked to the rationalist method of philosophy, that is the technique of deducing the nature of the world by pure a priori reason. Examples from the early modern period include Leibniz's monadology, Descartes's dualism, and Spinoza's monism. Hegel's absolute idealism and Whitehead's process philosophy were later systems.

More recent examples of system-oriented metaphysical approaches include structural-systematic philosophy, associated with the work of Lorenz B. Puntel and Alan White. Puntel develops this approach in Structure and Being: A Theoretical Framework for a Systematic Philosophy (2008) and Being and God (2011), which present a systematic metaphysical framework centered on structural relations. White draws on this project and extends it in Toward a Philosophical Theory of Everything (2014). Like earlier system-building philosophies, these works aim to articulate a comprehensive and internally coherent account of being.

Other philosophers do not believe philosophy should aim so high. Some scientists think a more mathematical approach than philosophy is needed for a ToE. For instance, Stephen Hawking wrote in A Brief History of Time that even if we had a ToE, it would necessarily be a set of equations. He wrote, "What is it that breathes fire into the equations and makes a universe for them to describe?" Similarly, physicist Steven Weinberg's Dreams of a Final Theory (1992) explores the longing for a final, beautiful set of physical laws while cautioning that such a theory would not answer all philosophical questions.

=== Integral theory and contemporary grand narratives ===
Another contemporary attempt at a comprehensive synthesis is integral theory, developed by Ken Wilber. Wilber's work attempts to integrate insights from science, psychology, spirituality, and cultural studies into a single framework he calls the "AQAL" (All Quadrants, All Levels) model. It posits that reality consists of holons (whole/parts) arranged in nested hierarchies of development across multiple dimensions. While integral theory has a significant popular following, it has been criticized by academic philosophers for its lack of rigorous argumentation and its tendency to conflate descriptive and prescriptive claims. Nevertheless, it represents a modern incarnation of the system-building impulse, demonstrating that the dream of a unified picture of everything remains alive.

== Nicholas Rescher's analysis ==
=== Properties and the impasse of self-substantiation ===
In "The Price of an Ultimate Theory", originally published in 2000, Nicholas Rescher specifies what he sees as the principal properties of a Theory of Everything and describes an apparent impasse on the road to such a theory.

==== Principle of sufficient reason ====
First, he takes as a presupposition the principle of sufficient reason, which in his formulation states that every fact x has an explanation y:

$$\forall x \, \exists y \, (x\ E\ y)$$

where E predicates explanation, so that x E y denotes "y explains x". This expresses that the explanatory relation E is left-total.

==== Comprehensiveness ====
Next, he asserts that the most direct and natural construction of a Theory of Everything T would confer upon it two crucial features: comprehensiveness and finality. Comprehensiveness says that wherever there is a fact x, T affords its explanation:

$$\forall x \, (x\ E\ T)$$

In particular, T explains itself (although it may be explained by one or more other facts as well):

$$T\ E\ T$$

==== Finality ====
Finality says that as an "ultimate theory", T has no deeper explanation:

$$\forall x \, ((T\ E\ x) \to (x = T))$$

so that the only conceivable explanation of T is T itself.

==== Noncircularity ====
Rescher notes that it is obviously problematic to deploy a theory for its own explanation; at the heart of the traditional conception of explanatory adequacy, he says, is a principle of noncircularity stating that no fact can explain itself:

$$\nexists x \, (x\ E\ x)$$

==== Impasse ====
The impasse is then that the two critical aspects of a Theory of Everything, comprehensiveness and finality, conflict with the fundamental principle of noncircularity. A comprehensive theory which explains everything must explain itself, and a final theory which has no deeper explanation must, by the principle of sufficient reason, have some explanation; consequently it too must be self-explanatory. Rescher concludes that any Theorist of Everything committed to comprehensiveness and finality is bound to regard noncircularity as "something that has to be jettisoned". But how, he asks, can a theory adequately substantiate itself?

=== Ways forward ===
Rescher's proposal in "The Price of an Ultimate Theory" is to dualize the concept of explanation so that a fact can be explained either derivationally, by the premises which lead to it, or systemically, by the consequences which follow from it. With derivational explanation, a fact t is explained when it is subsumed by some prior, more fundamental fact t'. With systemic explanation, t is explained when it is a "best fit" for its consequences, where fitness is measured by uniformity, simplicity, connectedness, and other criteria conducive to systemic integration. Rescher concludes that while a theory of everything cannot be explained derivationally (since no deeper explanation can subsume it), it can be explained systemically by its capacity to integrate its consequences.

In his 1996 book The Conscious Mind, David Chalmers argues that a theory of everything must explain consciousness, that consciousness does not logically supervene on the physical, and that therefore a fundamental theory in physics would not be a theory of everything. A truly final theory, he argues, needs not just physical properties and laws, but phenomenal or protophenomenal properties and psychophysical laws explaining the relationship between physical processes and conscious experience. He concludes that "[o]nce we have a fundamental theory of consciousness to accompany a fundamental theory in physics, we may truly have a theory of everything." Developing such a theory will not be straightforward, he says, but "it ought to be possible in principle."

In "Prolegomena to Any Future Philosophy", a 2002 essay in the Journal of Evolution and Technology, Mark Alan Walker discusses modern responses to the question of how to reconcile "the apparent finitude of humans" with what he calls "the traditional telos of philosophy—the attempt to unite thought and Being, to arrive at absolute knowledge, at a final theory of everything." He contrasts two ways of closing this "gap between the ambitions of philosophy, and the abilities of human philosophers": a "deflationary" approach in which philosophy is "scaled down into something more human" and the attempt to achieve a theory of everything is abandoned, and an "inflationary", transhumanist approach in which philosophers are "scaled up" by advanced technology into "super-intelligent beings" better able to pursue such a theory.

=== Criticism ===
In "Holistic Explanation and the Idea of a Grand Unified Theory", originally presented as a lecture in 1998, Rescher identifies two negative reactions to the idea of a unified, overarching theory: reductionism and rejectionism. Reductionism holds that large-scale philosophical issues can be meaningfully addressed only when divided into lesser components, while rejectionism holds that questions about such issues are illegitimate and unanswerable. Against reductionism, Rescher argues that explaining individual parts does not explain the coordinating structure of the whole, so that a collectivized approach is required. Against rejectionism, he argues that the question of the "reason" – the "why" – behind existence is pressing, important, and not obviously meaningless.

== Mathematical and logical constraints ==
Beyond Rescher's analysis, the search for a ToE encounters broader logical and epistemological barriers. Gödel's incompleteness theorems show that for any consistent axiomatic system rich enough to include arithmetic, there are statements that are true but unprovable within the system. While these theorems apply directly to formal mathematical systems, philosophers have argued that they have implications for any attempt to formalize all knowledge about reality. If a ToE were to be expressed as a formal system, it would either be incomplete (there are truths about the world it cannot prove) or inconsistent. This line of reasoning has been pursued by scholars such as John Lucas and Roger Penrose, who argue that human insight forever surpasses algorithmic systems. Jürgen Schmidhuber's work on algorithmic information theory suggests that any finite description of the universe will miss an infinite amount of irreducible complexity.

Additionally, Tarski's undefinability theorem shows that truth cannot be defined within a sufficiently expressive formal language without running into paradox. If a ToE purports to be a complete description of reality, it must include a definition of truth for its own statements. Tarski's result implies that this can only be done by stepping outside the original language into a richer metalanguage, suggesting an infinite hierarchy of explanations rather than a single ultimate theory.

These formal limitations lend weight to the idea that reality may be intrinsically open and that any ultimate description will always point beyond itself. Charles Sanders Peirce's fallibilism and his concept of an "infinite community" of inquiry similarly suggest that truth is the asymptote of a never-ending process, not a fixed body of doctrine.

== Practical and methodological objections ==
Apart from logical barriers, practical objections arise from the finite nature of human cognition. The amount of information needed to describe every fact about the universe is vastly larger than any individual or collective human mind could ever process. Even if a compact set of laws could generate all phenomena, the "explanation" of any particular event would require an infinite regress of initial conditions and boundary specifications. This is sometimes called the "completeness vs. complexity" trade-off. A theory can be simple in its fundamental laws but infinitely complex in its consequences; a complete description would have to encompass both levels, which is practically impossible.

Moreover, the historical record shows a pattern of successive theories that overturn previous "final" systems. Each generation's ToE is later found to be incomplete or incorrect, suggesting that the pursuit is asymptotic. The philosopher Karl Popper argued that all knowledge is conjectural and falsifiable, and that the dream of a final, unfalsifiable theory is incompatible with the scientific method. Thomas Kuhn's theory of paradigm shifts suggests that fundamental theories are incommensurable across revolutions, so there is no single, stable ToE that would survive all possible future changes.

== Ethical and existential dimensions ==
A philosophical ToE would not only explain the physical world but would also address questions of value, meaning, and purpose. Why do humans seek a theory of everything? Some philosophers see in this quest a deep existential need to make sense of our place in the cosmos. A complete theory might provide a foundation for ethics, aesthetics, and the meaning of life by showing how they fit into the overall structure of reality. For instance, integral theory, developed by Ken Wilber, attempts to integrate scientific and spiritual perspectives into a single framework, though it is often criticized for being overly ambitious and lacking empirical grounding. In a more analytical vein, Derek Parfit's On What Matters (2011) strives for a unified account of reasons, morality, and normativity that could be considered a limited ToE in the practical domain.

The desire for a ToE may also be driven by what psychologists call "cognitive closure": the need for definite answers to reduce uncertainty. However, some existentialist philosophers, such as Albert Camus, suggest that the absence of a final explanation is what gives life its freedom and authenticity. Accepting the "absurd" gap between our longing for meaning and the universe's silence may be more honest than clinging to an unattainable final truth.

== Further challenges from contemporary philosophy ==
Several other currents in 20th and 21st century philosophy directly challenge the possibility or desirability of a ToE. Post-structuralism, exemplified by Jacques Derrida's concept of différance, holds that meaning is always deferred and never fully present, so any claim to a final, complete account of reality is illusory. Pragmatism, in the tradition of Richard Rorty, rejects the idea of a "God's-eye view" and suggests that the best we can do is to offer contingent, useful descriptions that work for particular purposes, not a single ultimate truth. Rorty famously argued that philosophy should stop trying to be the "mirror of nature" and instead become a conversation.

Feminist epistemology and standpoint theory argue that all knowledge is situated and partial, shaped by social location and power relations. From this perspective, a single ToE would inevitably reflect the biases of those who construct it and would silence alternative voices. Thus, a truly comprehensive theory would need to be polyphonic, incorporating multiple, irreducible perspectives, which may be contradictory and impossible to unify. Sandra Harding's "strong objectivity" concept calls for a diversity of standpoints rather than a single overarching narrative.

== The aesthetics of a final theory ==
An interesting dimension of the ToE discourse is the role of aesthetic criteria. Many physicists and philosophers have argued that a final theory would be "beautiful" in its simplicity and symmetry. Steven Weinberg's Dreams of a Final Theory (1992) explores this theme, noting that the search for a ToE is driven as much by an aesthetic longing for elegance as by a purely logical need for explanation. Paul Dirac, Albert Einstein, and Hermann Weyl all held that fundamental laws possess mathematical beauty. However, aesthetic judgments are subjective, and what appears beautiful to one generation may appear clumsy to the next. The history of science is replete with theories once deemed elegant (such as the Ptolemaic system or the ether) that were later abandoned. Moreover, an excessive focus on simplicity may lead to ignoring messy but essential details, a point emphasized by Nancy Cartwright in her critique of fundamentalism.

== Conclusion ==
The philosophical theory of everything remains a regulative ideal rather than an achievable goal for many thinkers. It represents the ultimate ambition of reason: to understand the whole of reality. Whether one believes that such understanding is possible, the pursuit itself has generated profound insights into the nature of explanation, the limits of human cognition, and the structure of being. The ongoing dialogue between system-builders, critics, and those who propose novel logical limits ensures that the question of a final theory remains one of the most fertile areas of philosophical inquiry.

== See also ==
- Integral theory
- Metaphilosophy
- Systematic philosophy
- Theory of everything (physics)
- Gödel's incompleteness theorems
- Principle of sufficient reason
- Fallibilism
- Structural-systematic philosophy
- Post-structuralism
- Pragmatism
- Standpoint theory
- Dreams of a Final Theory
