= Christopher Southgate =

British theologian and poet (b. 1953)

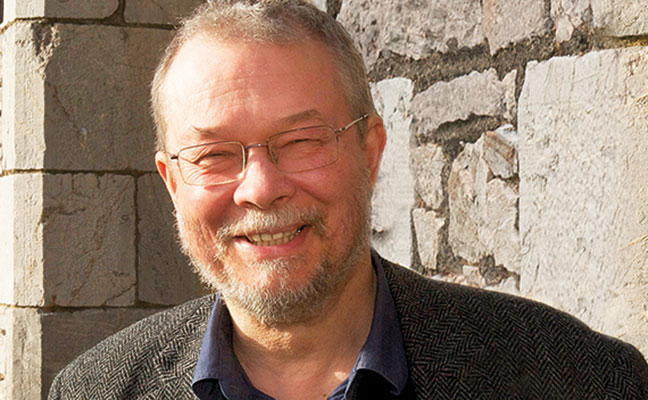
- Born: Christopher Charles Benedict Southgate; September 26, 1953 (age 73)
- Occupations: Theologian, poet
- Employer: University of Exeter
- Known for: Evolutionary theodicy, science–religion dialogue
- Website: christophersouthgate.org.uk

Christopher Charles Benedict Southgate (born 26 September 1953) is a British theologian and poet. He is Professor of Christian Theodicy in the Department of Classics, Ancient History, Religion and Theology at the University of Exeter, where he has taught since 1993.

== Life and work ==
=== Education and early career ===
Southgate trained originally as a research biochemist, completing a PhD in Biochemistry at the University of Cambridge. Following postdoctoral research he later undertook theological training, subsequently becoming a lay chaplain at the University of Exeter, where he was invited to begin teaching the science–religion debate for the Department of Theology.

=== Academic career ===
Southgate has taught at the University of Exeter since 1993 and was appointed Professor of Christian Theodicy in 2018. His research interests include the problem of suffering in evolution, the concept of divine glory in the natural world and in religious poetry, the science of the origin of life, and pastoral responses to tragic events in church congregations.

Southgate taught for the South West Ministry Training Course (now Spiritus College) from 2001-17, serving as Principal from 2013. He is a former editor of Reviews in Science and Religion. He is a Fellow of the International Society for Science and Religion and a Fellow of the Higher Education Academy, and has served on the editorial advisory board of Zygon: Journal of Religion and Science.

=== Theology ===
Southgate's work, The Groaning of Creation: God, Evolution, and the Problem of Evil, examines the theological challenge posed by suffering and extinction in the evolutionary process. The book has been described as seminal in the field of evolutionary theodicy.

Southgate gave the 2014 Sarum Lectures on divine glory, the 2016 Gowland Lecture on science and poetry, and the 2022 Boyle Lecture on natural evil.

Southgate has appeared as a contributor on the Closer to Truth public television series on science, philosophy, and religion.

Southgate's research and teaching was honoured with a special issue of the journal Zygon in September 2018.

=== Poetry ===
Reviewers of Southgate’s poetry comment:

(of his verse biography of TS Eliot) Professor Frances Young writes of ‘the extraordinary originality and generative power of the book’.

(of ‘Rain falling by the River’) Dr Mark Oakley writes: ‘Southgate’s poems are not for a church of the warm shallows. They are serious, sometimes wry, always reverential… Though the snow has indeed begun to thaw in Southgate’s poetry, fighting both illusion and disillusion through faith, we can still see our breath in the cold air and feel the draw of home.’

(of Easing the Gravity Field: poems of science and love) John Arthur Nunes writes: ‘sheer delight permeates this encounter with tangible things, terrible things, true things;

== Selected bibliography ==
=== Theology ===
- God, Humanity and the Cosmos: A Textbook in Science and Religion, ed. Christopher Southgate (T&T Clark, 1999; 2nd ed. 2005; 3rd ed. 2011)
- The Groaning of Creation: God, Evolution, and the Problem of Evil (Westminster John Knox Press, 2008)
- Ecological Hermeneutics, ed. David G. Horrell, Cherryl Hunt, Christopher Southgate, and Francesca Stavrakopoulou (T&T Clark, 2010)
- Greening Paul: Rereading the Apostle in a Time of Ecological Crisis, David G. Horrell, Cherryl Hunt, and Christopher Southgate (Baylor University Press, 2010)
- Theology in a Suffering World: Glory and Longing (Cambridge University Press, 2018)
- Tragedies and Christian Congregations, ed. Megan Warner, Carla Grosch-Miller, Hilary Ison, and Christopher Southgate (Routledge, 2019)
- Monotheism and the Suffering of Animals in Nature (Cambridge University Press, 2023)
- God, Struggle and Suffering in the Evolution of Life, Christopher Southgate, Paul S. Fiddes, Michael Lloyd, Neil Messer, Bethany Sollereder, and Mark R. Wynn (Bloomsbury, 2025)

=== Poetry (selected) ===
- A Love and its Sounding: Explorations of T.S. Eliot (Salzburg, 1997)
- Beyond the Bitter Wind: Poems 1982–2000 (Shoestring Press, 2000)
- Easing the Gravity Field: Poems of Science and Love (Shoestring Press, 2006)
- Rain Falling by the River: New and Selected Poems of the Spirit (Canterbury Press, 2017)
- Losing Ithaca (Shoestring Press, 2023)
