= Thomas Seebohm =

German philosopher (1934 – 2014)

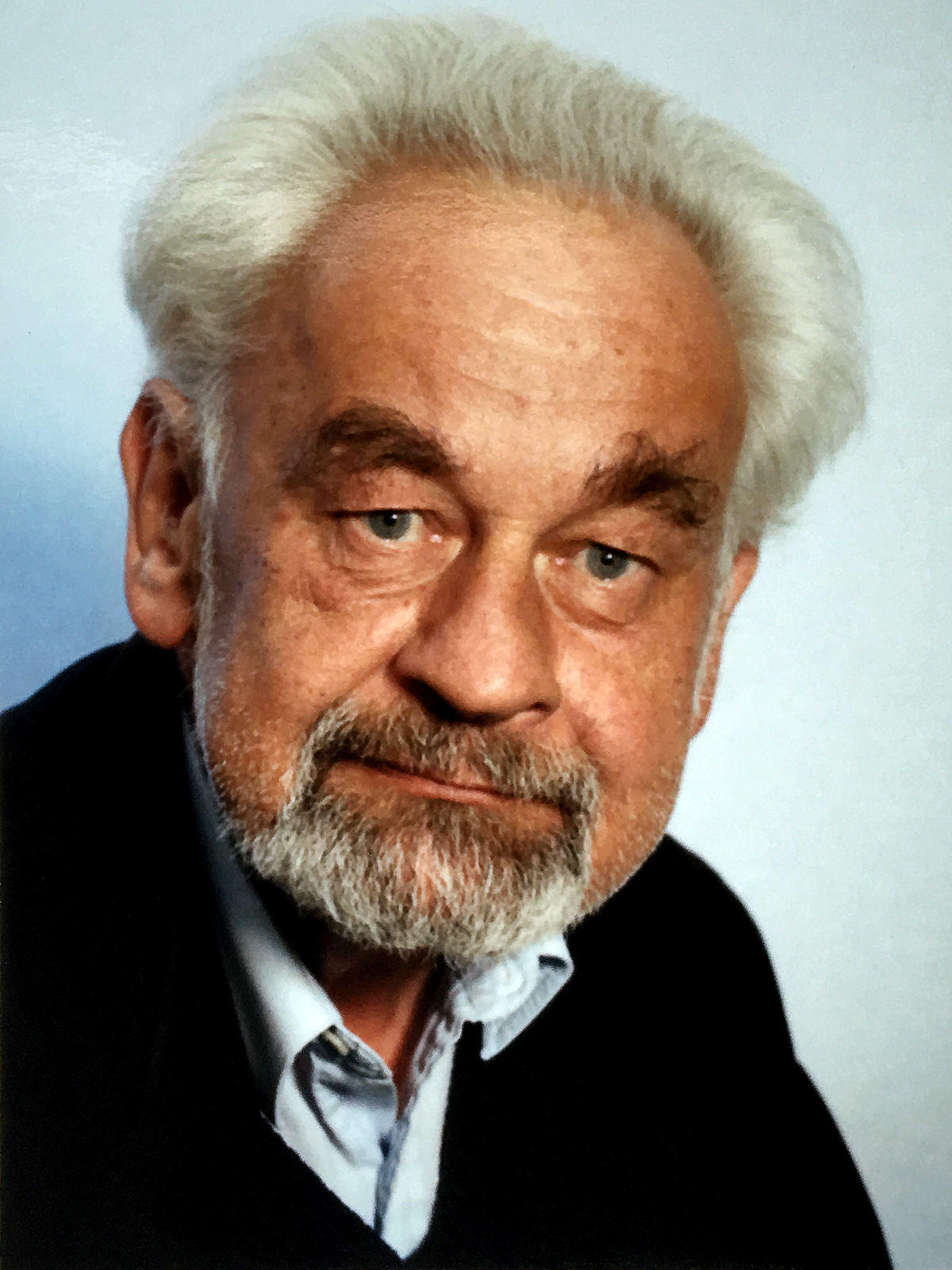
Thomas Seebohm

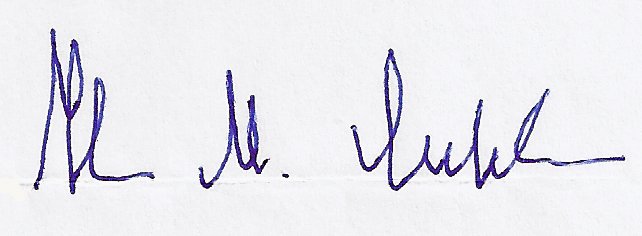
Signature in 1994

Thomas Seebohm (born William Thomas Mulvany Seebohm, July 7, 1934, Gleiwitz, Upper Silesia – August 25, 2014, Bonn) was a German phenomenological philosopher whose wide-ranging interests included, among others, Immanuel Kant, Edmund Husserl, hermeneutics, and logic. Other areas of Professor Seebohm's interests included the history of philosophy, philosophy of history, philosophy of the formal sciences, methodology and philosophy of the human sciences, the history of 19th century British Empiricism, American pragmatism, analytic philosophy, philosophy of law and practical philosophy, and the development of the history of philosophy in Eastern Europe. Despite this diverse span of interests, Seebohm was chiefly known as a phenomenologist, who "above all...considered himself a creative phenomenologist, who as a critically reflecting philosopher would look at all major issues with which he became confronted, from a transcendental phenomenological point of view."

== Biography ==
Seebohm was born in Gleiwitz, the son of the German minister of transport Hans-Christoph Seebohm, and graduated from high school in 1952 from the division of languages (later passing an additional exam in Classical Greek in 1956). He learned cabinetmaking after high school from 1952–1954, passing his journeyman's examination in March 1954 and began his academic career thereafter. His university studies were conducted at the universities of Hamburg, Bonn, Saarbrücken, and Mainz with focuses in philosophy, Slavic languages, Slavonic literature, and sociology. He earned his PhD summa cum laude in philosophy, Slavonic literature, and sociology from the University of Mainz in 1960 with the completion of his dissertation, Die Bedingungen der Möglichkeit der Transzendentalphilosophie: Edmund Husserls transcendental-phänomenologischer Ansatz, dargestellt im Anschluss an seine Kant-Kritik (The conditions of the possibility of transcendental philosophy: Edmund Husserl's transcendental-phenomenological assessment, presented in connection with his criticism of Kant), which was published later in 1962.

From 1960 to 1965 Seebohm was without a permanent teaching position, but survived on a fellowship and conducted research on "the history of medieval Russian philosophy and culture," the results of which would eventually be published in book form more than a decade later in 1977 as Ratio and Charisma. Starting points for the development of a philosophic and scientific understanding of the Russian cultural world of Moscow. In 1965, Seebohm secured his first position as a teacher of philosophy as an "assistant" at the University of Mainz, with his second appointment as a visiting professor at the Pennsylvania State University coming soon after in 1970. After a brief, year-long stint as a professor at the University of Trier in 1973, Seebohm became a full professor of philosophy at the Pennsylvania State University, a position he would retain from 1973 to 1984. In those years he served as a visiting professor at both The New School for Social Research in 1980 and the University of Heidelberg in 1981 before returning to his patria at the University of Mainz as Professor of Philosophy, succeeding a fellow phenomenologist, Gerhard Funke. Throughout his tenures as professor of philosophy, Seebohm had offered courses in German idealism, phenomenology, formal and formalized logic, and in hermeneutics.

In addition to this, Seebohm served as the chairman of the Philosophische Seminar, member of the board of directions for the Center for Advanced Research in Phenomenology, secretary of the Inner Circle of the Allgemeine Gesellschaft für Philosophie in Germany, an honorary member of the North American Kant Society, and a winner of the Ballard Prize from the Center for Advanced Research in Phenomenology for his book Hermeneutics, Method and Methodology. He also served terms as president of the Kant Gesellschaft and as editor of Kant Studien.
