= Lorenz Bruno Puntel =

German philosopher (1935–2024)

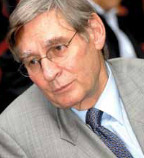
- Puntel in 2018
- Born: Lourencinho Bruno Puntel; 22 September 1935; Sobradinho, Rio Grande do Sul, Brazil
- Died: 16 July 2024 (aged 88); Augsburg, Bavaria, Germany
- Spouse: Christina Schneider
- Awards: Findlay Book Prize (2011)

Education
- Education: LMU Munich (Ph.D., 1968; Dr. phil. hab., 1972); University of Innsbruck (Dr. theol., 1969)
- Doctoral advisor: Max Müller
- Other advisors: Martin Heidegger; Karl Rahner

Philosophical work
- Era: Contemporary philosophy
- Region: Western philosophy
- School: Continental (early); Analytic/structural
- Institutions: LMU Munich
- Main interests: Metaphysics, meta-metaphysics, epistemology, philosophy of science, philosophy of religion
- Notable ideas: Structural-systematic philosophy Philosophical theory of everything

Lorenz Bruno Puntel (born Lourencinho Bruno Puntel /ˈpʊntəl/; German: [ˈpʊntəl]; Brazilian Portuguese: [pũˈtɛw]; 22 September 1935 – 16 July 2024) was a Brazilian-born German philosopher who established the school of structural-systematic philosophy. Puntel was named as one of the great contemporary philosophers, articulating his ideas from the most varied traditions.

== Biography ==
Puntel studied philosophy, theology, philology and psychology at LMU Munich, the University of Innsbruck, the University of Vienna, the University of Paris, and the Sapienza University of Rome. He obtained a doctorate in philosophy from LMU Munich in 1968 (Note: Thesis title: Analogie und Geschichtlichkeit (Analogy and Historicity).) (under Max Müller) and a doctorate in Catholic theology from the University of Innsbruck in 1969. He obtained his habilitation in Hegelian philosophy from LMU Munich in 1972 (Note: Thesis title: Darstellung, Methode und Struktur: Untersuchungen zur Einheit der systematischen Philosophie G. W. F. Hegels (Exposition, Method, and Structure: Studies on the Unity of G. W. F. Hegel’s Systematic Philosophy).) under Müller. He was a student of Karl Rahner at LMU Munich. In the late 1960s and early 1970s, he studied with Martin Heidegger in Freiburg and remained interested in Heidegger's philosophy throughout his life.

He became a professor at the Institute of Philosophy at LMU Munich in 1975. Beginning in 1983, Puntel held visiting professorships at Pittsburgh, Harvard, and Princeton. From September 1987 to June 1988, he was a member of the School of Historical Studies at the Institute for Advanced Study in Princeton. Puntel retired from LMU Munich in 2001, when he became professor emeritus.

He died in Augsburg, Bavaria on 16 July 2024, at the age of 88.

== Philosophical work ==
Puntel established the school of structural-systematic philosophy which tries to reconstruct the systematics of philosophy from a unique viewpoint: it involves the elaboration of a theoretical language, abandoning the idea of a language of predicates. Puntel drew on sources ranging from G. W. Leibniz, German idealism, Heidegger's phenomenology, and even analytic philosophy.

== Awards ==
Retired in 2001, in 2016, he received an honorary doctorate from the Munich School of Philosophy.

He also received the Findlay Book Prize in 2011.

== Bibliography ==
- Analogy and Historicity: Philosophical-Historical-Critical Attempt at the Basic Problem of Metaphysics. Herder Verlag, Freiburg, 1969.
- Presentation, Method and Structure: Investigations in the Unity of Systematic Philosophy of G. W. F. Hegel. Bouvier Verlag, Bonn, 1973.
- Theories of Truth in Modern Philosophy: A Critical and Systematic Presentation. Wissenschaftliche Buchgesellschaft, Darmstadt, 1978, ISBN 3534072588. 3rd edition, 1993.
- (ed., introduction) The Concept of Truth: New Attempts at Explanation. Wissenschaftliche Buchgesellschaft, Darmstadt, 1987, ISBN 3-534-02134-7.
- Basics of a Theory of Truth. W. de Gruyter, Berlin / New York, 1990, ISBN 3-11-012079-8.
- Structure and Being: A Theoretical Framework for a Systematic Philosophy. Mohr Siebeck Verlag, Tübingen, 2006, ISBN 3-16-148963-2.
- Being and God: A Systematic Approach in Dealing with M. Heidegger, E. Levinas and J.-L. Marion. Mohr Siebeck Verlag, Tübingen, 2010, ISBN 978-3-16-150146-3.
- (with Emmanuel Tourpe) Philosophy as a Systematic Discourse: Dialogues About the Basics of a Theory of Beings. Karl Alber, Freiburg im Breisgau, 2014.
- Being and Nothing: The Primordial Question of Philosophy, Bloomsbury Academic, London, 2025.
