= Theism =

Belief in God or gods

Theism is belief in God or gods. In a narrow sense, it refers to belief in a single creator deity who is all-powerful, all-knowing, and all-benevolent. A god is a powerful being, often understood as a conscious and immortal person, but the exact characterization and divine attributes vary by tradition. Theism contrasts with nontheism and atheism, which involve the absence or rejection of belief in gods, and with agnosticism, which holds that the existence of gods is unknown or unknowable.

Types of theism can be distinguished by the number of gods they affirm: monotheism accepts only one god, whereas polytheism believes in several gods. Another classification focuses on the relation between the divine and the world. Classical theism believes in a single creator God who is distinct from the world, sustains it, and can actively engage with it. Deism holds that the world operates according to its own laws without divine intervention. Pantheism affirms that God is identical to the world, while panentheism maintains that the world is part of God. Other classifications include process theism, open theism, theistic finitism, and skeptical theism.

Many arguments for and against theism are discussed in the academic literature. Ontological arguments rely on pure reasoning, for example, by deducing the existence of God from the concept of God. Cosmological arguments affirm that a first cause or necessary being is required to explain the existence of the world. Teleological arguments hold that certain features of the world, such as the presence of intelligent life, indicate the existence of an intelligent designer God. Arguments from evil maintain that the presence of evil in the world undermines the claim that God exists. Science-based criticisms assert that the development of the universe and life is better explained by modern science than by religious doctrines. Other objections hold that the concept of God is incoherent or that the available evidence is insufficient to support theism.

Although theism is not itself a religion, it is a central feature of many religions, including the Abrahamic religions, Hinduism, Sikhism, and Chinese and African folk religions. It is of interest to various fields of inquiry, such as religious studies, philosophy, anthropology, and sociology. Theism has possible precursors in prehistory and is expressed in diverse religions that arose in antiquity. It evolved in various ways in subsequent history and was shaped by theological and philosophical debates about the nature and existence of God or gods.

== Definition ==
Theism is a family of views about the existence of a god or gods, but its precise definition is disputed. Understood broadly, it is the view that at least one god exists. (Note: It is a form of philosophical realism, holding that god exists independently of human thought. It contrasts with anti-realist views, some of which argue that god exists as a construction or projection of the mind.) This characterization leaves open whether there is more than one god and what divine attributes deities have. In this sense, theism contrasts with nontheism and atheism, which denote an absence or rejection of belief in a god or gods. Defined more narrowly, theism refers to the affirmation of the existence of a single god: a supreme being that is all-knowing, all-powerful, and all-benevolent. This view is sometimes associated with the beliefs that God created the world, is distinct from it, actively governs it, and is worthy of human worship. (Note: This view roughly overlaps with the definition of classical theism.) According to this narrow characterization, belief systems that characterize God differently or affirm more than one god do not belong to theism.

Some approaches characterize theism in psychological terms as a belief, while others regard it as a proposition or philosophical thesis that is either true or false, regardless of whether anyone believes it. A person who believes in theism is called a theist. Theism is a central tenet of various religions, often acting as an underlying presupposition of their worldviews and forms of life. However, it is not itself a particular religion, and a person can be a theist without belonging to an organized religion. (Note: Conversely, there are also nontheistic religions that do not believe in a god, such as some forms of Buddhism.) Religious traditions typically include additional doctrines, such as teachings about moral duties, religious practices, and the afterlife, and differ in how they describe the nature, number, and roles of deities.

The term theism has its roots in the ancient Greek word θεός (theos), meaning 'god' or 'divine power'. It entered the English language in the 17th century, coined by the philosopher and theologian Ralph Cudworth in his 1678 book The True Intellectual System of the Universe.

== Basic concepts ==
=== God and gods ===
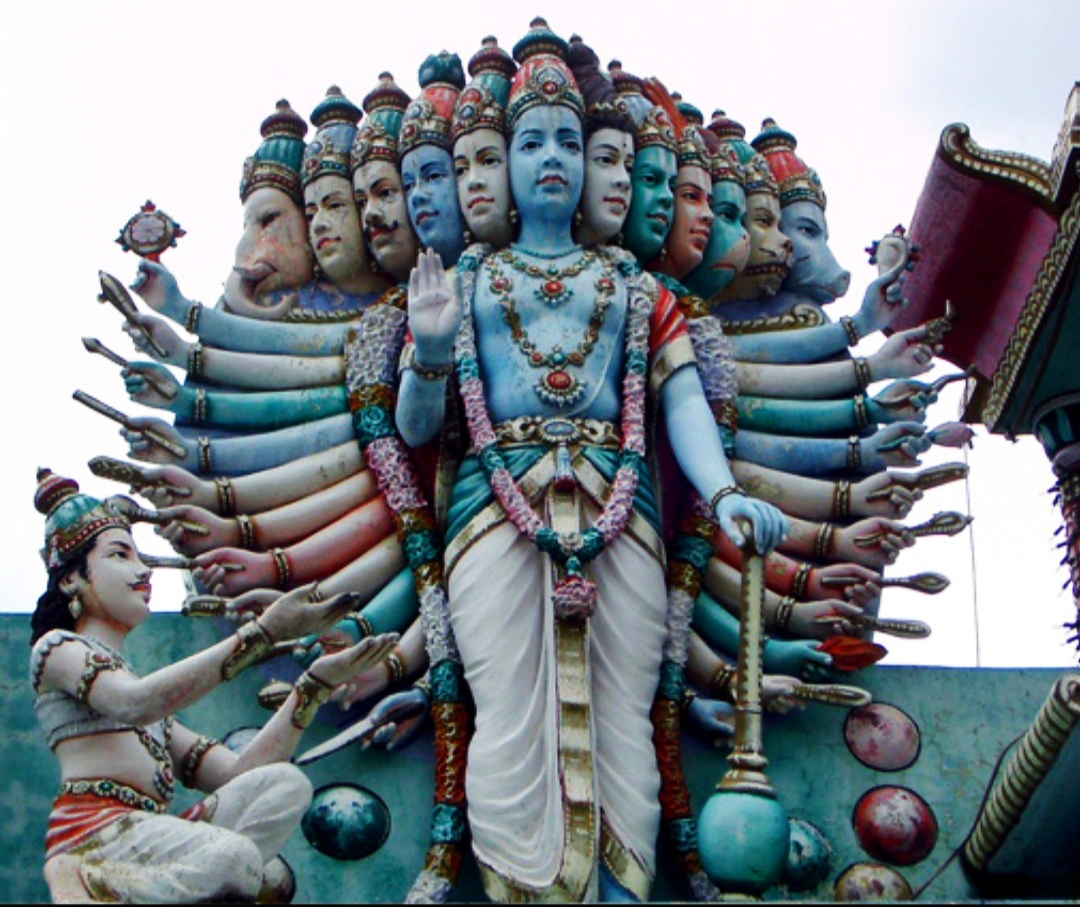
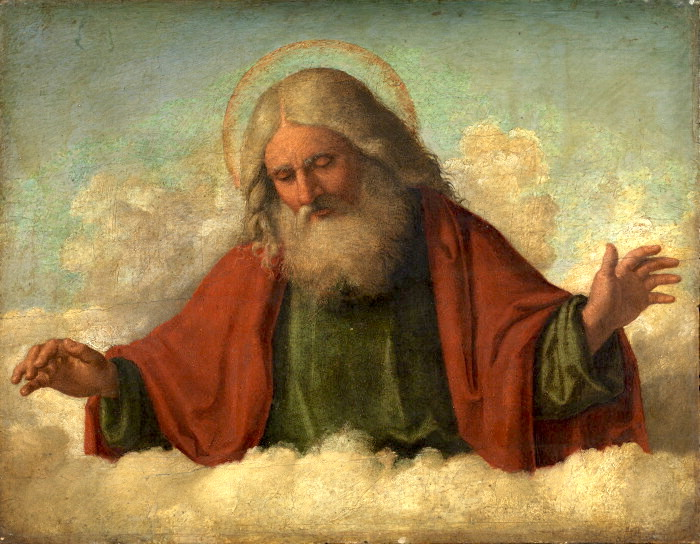
A god is typically understood as a sacred being, but the exact characterization varies by tradition, such as the contrast between Hindu (top), ancient Greek (middle), and Christian (bottom) conceptions.

The concept god is central to many aspects of theism, concerning both its definition and the arguments for and against it. A god is typically understood as a sacred being that possesses and exercises special powers over the natural world. Examples include Shiva in Hinduism, Ra in the ancient Egyptian religion, Zeus in the ancient Greek religion, Olodumare in the Yoruba religion, Yahweh in Judaism, the Christian God, and Allah in Islam. (Note: Gods are usually seen as beings of a high rank or the highest rank. For some non-ordinary beings, such as the kami in Shinto, it is controversial whether they should be classified as gods or as lower deities, such as spirits.) Gods are normally regarded as personal and conscious beings, in contrast to impersonal divine principles or forces, such as the law of karma in Buddhism. They are often seen as supernatural entities capable of influencing the natural world without being bound by its laws. (Note: Some forms of pantheism reject this idea, holding instead that God is identical to nature.) The precise characterization of the nature and attributes of gods varies across traditions.

Theorists sometimes distinguish the specific concept God, spelled with an uppercase letter, from the more general concept of gods. According to this view, God is the singular highest being, either as the only existing god or as the supreme reality that includes all gods. (Note: Another philosophical discussion analyzes the linguistic category of the term God, for example, whether it should be interpreted as a proper name for an individual, a definite description, a general term for a certain type of being, or a title.) An influential characterization, associated with perfect being theology, considers God as a supreme being with the highest degree of perfection, typically expressed in three divine attributes: omnipotence, omniscience, and omnibenevolence. Omnipotence means that God is all-powerful: they have maximal power and can do whatever is possible, without any external restraints limiting what they are capable of. Omniscience means that God is all-knowing: they have maximal knowledge and are aware of every truth without error or uncertainty, encompassing everything that was, is, and will be. Omnibenevolence means that God is maximally good: they possess ultimate kindness and generosity, and treat every being with perfect moral goodness.

Another common characterization describes God as self-existent and independent, while worldly entities are regarded as dependent on God, (Note: The type of dependence can be either negative or positive. Negative dependence means that worldly entities can exist because God permits it. Positive dependence means that worldly entities exist because God actively sustains them.) for example, because God created the world from nothing and actively governs it. This contrast is sometimes expressed by asserting that God exists necessarily and could not have failed to exist, while worldly entities exist contingently and could have failed to exist. Other suggested attributes include that God is eternal (without beginning and end), immutable (unchanging), omnipresent (present everywhere in the physical universe), transcendent (existing beyond the limits of the physical universe), simple (not composed of parts), incorporeal (without a body), and hidden (not directly perceivable).

Another topic concerns religious language used to describe the divine and whether it is possible, at least in principle, to give an accurate description of God or gods. Cataphatic theology argues that positive descriptions are possible: one can state what a god is like and what features they have. Apophatic theology rejects this view, proposing instead that only negative descriptions are possible: statements about what a god is not. A related discussion concerns the meaning and accuracy of religious language. The theory of univocity holds that terms used in theological descriptions, such as good and wise, have the same meaning when applied to humans and deities. Analogical theories, by contrast, hold that their meanings differ, for example, that the goodness of a deity resembles that of a human being although the two expressions do not convey the same idea.

=== Belief ===
Belief, another central term, is a mental state or subjective attitude about what is true. It contrasts with disbelief, which regards a proposition as false, and with suspension of judgment, which remains neutral and neither affirms nor rejects. Belief can vary in degree of confidence and does not require absolute certainty. Accordingly, some theists may have unquestioning confidence, whereas others may hold a tentative belief while acknowledging uncertainty. One approach analyzes belief in terms of probability: to believe a proposition is to hold that it is more likely to be true than false. Belief may be based on rational justification, such as philosophical arguments, but a person may also hold a belief without being able to justify it.

Belief is closely related to faith, but the two are not always treated as synonyms. While both belief and faith typically involve regarding something as true, faith is often understood as including additional components. (Note: Philosophers discuss whether faith always includes belief or whether, in some cases, there can be faith without belief.) For example, faith in a deity may imply trust in and personal commitment to this deity beyond the assertion that it exists. Faith is also more closely associated with practical consequences as something that guides a person's life and motivates worship and rituals, rather than remaining a purely intellectual judgment.

Belief differs from desire and hope, which are subjective attitudes about what a person wants rather than what they take to be true. Accordingly, a person who desires or hopes that God exists is not necessarily a theist if they judge God's existence unlikely.

=== Contrasting views ===
Theism contrasts with atheism, which involves an absence or rejection of belief in God or gods. Atheism is sometimes divided into negative and positive forms. Negative atheism, sometimes called non-theism, denotes a mere absence of belief. In this sense, anyone who is not a theist is an atheist, including those who have no opinion or have never considered the issue. Positive atheism, by contrast, involves an active rejection of the existence of deities, implying a disbelief rather than a suspension of judgment. Defined more abstractly, it is the philosophical thesis that there is no god.

A different classification distinguishes between global and local atheism. Global atheism is a general denial of the existence of gods, applying to all deities regardless of their exact attributes or tradition-specific characterizations. It contrasts with local atheism, which rejects a particular conception of a god, such as the conception of an all-powerful, all-knowing, and all-benevolent god. Accordingly, a person can be a theist with respect to one god conception and a local atheist with respect to another, such as a Christian believer who is a local atheist regarding Zeus.

Another common contrast is between theism and agnosticism. Agnosticism can be defined in a psychological or a philosophical sense. Understood psychologically, it is a personal suspension of judgment as a type of negative atheism. Understood philosophically, it is the thesis that the existence of God or gods is unknowable. This view goes beyond a personal suspension of judgment: it is the more general claim that no one, neither oneself nor others, can know, for example, because the evidence for and against balances out or because there is no evidence either way. In this sense, agnosticism is sometimes regarded as a rejection of both theism and positive atheism by challenging the assumption that knowledge is possible. However, there is also a sense in which agnosticism and theism can be combined: an agnostic theist is someone who believes in a god while denying that knowledge can be achieved. (Note: This outlook overlaps with fideism, which holds that reason need not or cannot justify religious belief.)

When theism is defined in a narrow sense as the belief in a single supreme being that differs from and actively governs the world, it contrasts with other beliefs about gods. For example, it contrasts with polytheism, which believes in more than one god; with deism, which holds that God does not intervene in the world after creating it; and with pantheism, which holds that God is identical to the world.

Besides views that oppose theism, there are also positions about gods that concern aspects other than existence, such as values and attitudes. Pro-theism and anti-theism discuss whether God would contribute to the value of the world. (Note: The area of philosophy of religion examining this topic is called axiology of theism.) Pro-theists hold that it would be good if God existed, for example, because God has intrinsic value and makes the lives of people better. Anti-theists reject this idea: they contend that the world would be better off without God, for instance, because God's existence would undermine the sense of identity and meaning people get by deciding for themselves rather than following God's command; or because God's existence would threaten freedom, independence, and privacy. (Note: In a slightly different sense, the term anti-theism denotes a negative attitude towards theistic religions, holding that belief in God is harmful.) This view is related to misotheism, which is hatred of God. Apatheism, by contrast, is indifference to whether God exists. Ignosticism, or igtheism, holds that the word God is meaningless, challenging the coherence of discussions about God's existence. Another attitude-based classification distinguishes regular or doxastic theism (belief that God exists) from fiduciary theism (trust that God exists) and aspirational theism (hope that God exists). (Note: Other contrasting views include ultimism, which holds that something ultimate exists; ietsism, which maintains that there is an unspecified something that deserves religious commitment; and transtheism, which presents itself as an alternative that is beyond theism and atheism.)

== Types ==
=== By number of gods ===
Monotheism (top) and polytheism (bottom) disagree about whether there is only one God or several gods.

Different types of theism can be distinguished by the number of deities they accept. Monotheism is the view that there is only one god. This outlook is often combined with the belief that God is all-powerful and the ultimate source of everything. One motivation for monotheism is the idea that those divine attributes cannot be shared by several distinct beings. For example, if there were two all-powerful beings with conflicting goals, their opposing plans could not both be realized, calling into question their omnipotence. Monotheism can be either inclusive or exclusive. (Note: A similar distinction is between broad and narrow monotheism.) Inclusive monotheism accepts that there are several deities but holds that they are essentially one: they are conceived as different manifestations or expressions of a single ultimate being. Exclusive monotheism rejects this plurality: it holds that there is only one god and dismisses other purported deities as nonexistent or false gods. When used in a narrow sense, the term theism is sometimes limited to monotheism.

Monotheism contrasts with polytheism, which accepts the existence of multiple gods. Polytheists typically consider gods as powerful entities that engage with the world and influence human affairs. They are often considered immortal but not all-powerful. Each deity may be associated with a specific role, place, community, or human need. There can also be hierarchies within a pantheon of gods, with some gods being more powerful and ruling over other gods. One classification distinguishes between hard and soft polytheism. Hard polytheism is the view that each deity is a distinct conscious individual with its own personality and powers. Soft polytheism holds that the different deities are not literally distinct beings. Instead, it may conceive them as personifications of a single underlying force or characterize them as metaphors or psychological archetypes. (Note: Some authors limit the term polytheism to hard polytheism.) Certain belief systems are dualistic: they propose two primordial gods whose interaction shapes the world. Some conceive the world as a struggle between good and evil, as in Zoroastrianism, which describes a cosmic conflict between the benevolent Ahura Mazda and the destructive Angra Mainyu. (Note: Despite its dualistic tendencies, it is controversial whether Zoroastrianism should be considered monotheistic or polytheistic. For example, one monotheistic interpretation argues that Ahura Mazda is the single supreme deity and outranks Angra Mainyu.)

There are several forms of theism along the monotheism–polytheism spectrum. In henotheism, a believer worships a single god but also accepts the existence of other gods. Kathenotheism is a related outlook in which one god is worshipped at a time. Monolatry, another overlapping concept, involves the worship of one god while leaving open whether other gods exist. The exact meanings of henotheism, kathenotheism, and monolatry are disputed: the terms are sometimes used as synonyms and sometimes contrasted with each other. Monarchic monotheism, a different view, accepts the existence of many gods but holds that only one is supreme and rules over all others.

=== By relation to the world ===
Classical theism (top), pantheism (middle), and panentheism (bottom) disagree about whether the world is distinct from God, identical to God, or a part of God.

Another classification distinguishes forms of theism based on how they conceive the relation between the world and the divine. Classical theism is a form of monotheism that asserts that God created and sustains the world. It holds that God can actively engage with the world, for example, by performing miracles or answering prayers. At the same time, it maintains that God is transcendent: God is distinct from the world and exists independently of it without being bound by its laws. Classical theists believe that God is all-powerful, all-knowing, and all-benevolent. They also typically maintain that God is immaterial, unchangeable, eternal, self-sufficient, and simple. The term theism is sometimes used as a synonym for classical theism.

Deists agree with classical theists that God created the world and is distinct from it. However, they typically disagree about God's ongoing interaction and hold that God does not actively engage with the world after creating it, meaning that the world evolves according to its own laws without divine intervention. Deists also reject revelation in the form of holy scriptures or prophecies and argue instead for a form of rationalism based on natural theology, according to which God is revealed through nature. (Note: Historically, the term deism was used as a synonym for theism. Its precise meaning is disputed, and more limited definitions restrict deism to the view that God's existence can be known through natural reason without supernatural revelation.)

Pantheism rejects the belief, held by classical theism and deism, that God is distinct from the world. Instead, it argues that God and the world are identical. This usually results in an impersonal understanding of God as an all-encompassing reality. Pantheists typically regard the world as a self-organizing whole that does not require a separate supernatural creator. For them, the world is itself divine and God is immanent or present in all things.

Panentheism combines certain aspects of classical theism and pantheism. It holds that the world is part of God, but that God extends beyond it. In this sense, God is both immanent and transcendent. (Note: Merotheism reverses the panentheistic relation between world and God: it holds that the world includes God but extends beyond God.) Pandeism, another view, combines certain aspects of deism and pantheism. It maintains that God created the world by transforming into it so that a god distinct from the world no longer exists.

=== Other types ===
Process theism challenges certain aspects of classical theism, such as the view that God is entirely unchanging and unaffected by the world. This view is based on process philosophy and emphasizes change and becoming as fundamental aspects of reality, including God. Process theism is sometimes combined with dipolar theism, which holds that God has complementary aspects, for example, that God is immutable in some respects and mutable in others.

Open theism is a different challenge to classical theism by modifying its understanding of divine omniscience. It holds that God knows everything about the past and present, and is aware of all future possibilities. However, open theism argues that the future is open: it is not yet determined which possibilities will be realized. A key motivation for this view is to resolve potential conflicts between divine foreknowledge and human free will: God does not yet know how people will choose, so their decisions can be genuinely free.

Theistic finitism and skeptical theism seek to reconcile the existence of God and evil. Theistic finitism suggests that God is not omnipotent: God wants to eradicate all suffering but is unable to do so. Skeptical theism holds that human understanding is too limited to grasp God's reasons for permitting suffering. Agnostic theism is also about the limits of knowledge, but it is primarily concerned with God's existence rather than the problem of evil. It combines belief in God with the view that God's existence is unknown or unknowable, leaving believers to rely on faith rather than certain knowledge.

Historical theism denotes belief in God according to the doctrines of an established religious tradition, affirming both its conception of God and additional teachings regarding holy scriptures, prophets, and historical events. It contrasts with metaphysical or philosophical theism, which is a tradition-independent belief in God based on philosophical considerations rather than scriptural authority or prophetic revelation. Egotheism, or autotheism, is the belief that the self is God.

== Arguments ==
Many arguments for and against theism are discussed in the academic literature. A priori arguments rely on pure reasoning without information from sensory experience, such as arguments for or against God's existence based on the implications or coherence of the concept God. They contrast with a posteriori arguments, which start with a premise about something humans experience, such as a general observation that there is intelligent life or a specific religious experience. A related distinction is between deductive and non-deductive arguments. The premises of a valid deductive argument provide the strongest support: the conclusion cannot be false if they are true. The premises of a non-deductive argument make its conclusion more likely or reasonable. However, they do not establish it with certainty: the conclusion could be false even if all premises are true.

The cumulative approach combines insights from several arguments. It seeks to overcome the limitations of arguments in which each, considered individually, is not sufficiently strong to justify a definitive conclusion. By drawing on many arguments for and against theism, it aims to establish a verdict that considers all relevant reasons. Philosophers may adopt this approach if they hold that there is no single irrefutable proof or no generally accessible self-evident observation that can settle the issue on its own.

Some arguments target tradition-specific conceptions of gods or rely on the doctrines and scriptures of a particular religion, while others address the topic more generally. Arguments based on the holy texts and teachings of particular traditions are associated with the field of revealed theology, whereas natural theology explores arguments based on general reason and experience. While discussions typically focus on the existence of gods, another approach interprets theism more broadly as a form of life and examines whether it is a coherent and adequate response to the demands of the human condition. (Note: This approach is inspired by Ludwig Wittgenstein's idea that religious language belongs to a language game associated with a religious way of life. This perspective holds that religious language should be interpreted by how it is used rather than assuming that its meaning depends primarily on independently verifiable facts.)

=== For ===
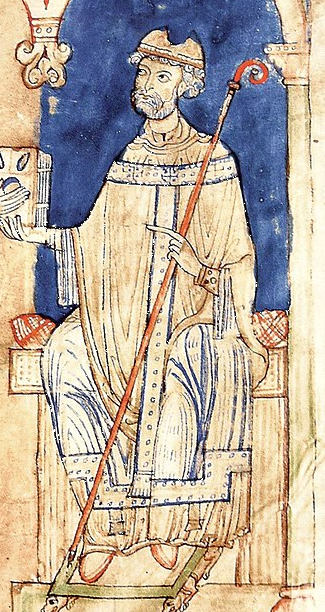
Anselm of Canterbury formulated an influential ontological argument for God's existence.

Ontological arguments are a family of a priori inferences regarding the existence of God. (Note: The term ontological argument is typically used for arguments in favor of God's existence. Understood in a broader sense, it may also include a priori arguments against God's existence.) They usually start from a definition of God or a discussion of God's essential attributes, together with general claims about existence and what is possible or conceivable. The traditional version of the ontological argument was proposed by Anselm of Canterbury. It begins with the definition that God is the greatest conceivable being. Relying on the assumption that a being with existence is greater than a being without existence, it concludes that God must exist, because otherwise, God would not be the greatest conceivable being.

Many other arguments for theism, such as cosmological and teleological arguments, are a posteriori arguments. Cosmological arguments infer the existence of God from the existence of the world. They seek to justify the idea that some kind of first cause or necessary being is required to explain that there is a world. One approach relies on an infinite regress argument: it asserts that each worldly event has a cause and that if that cause is itself a worldly event, it would lead to an infinite chain of causes and effects. Based on the assumption that this is impossible, it holds that there must be a first cause, namely God. A different version uses the principle of sufficient reason. Rather than challenging the possibility of an infinite chain of causes and effects, it argues that there must be a reason for this chain of contingent events: a necessary entity serving as its ground of being. Once a cosmological argument has concluded that there is a first cause or necessary being, it typically proceeds by arguing that this entity has the essential features associated with God.

Teleological arguments are similar to cosmological arguments by treating the world as evidence for God. A key difference is that cosmological arguments focus on the existence of the world in general, whereas teleological arguments consider specific aspects of it. Teleological arguments often take the form of design arguments, which assert that certain features of the world are best explained by assuming they were created by an intelligent designer. Different versions of teleological arguments focus on distinct features, such as the observations that the universe is orderly and follows natural laws; that it is beautiful, interconnected, and purposeful; or that it is suitable for intelligent life. Some design arguments proceed by analogy with human creations. For example, William Paley held that someone who finds a watch on the ground is justified in assuming that it was made by an intelligent watchmaker and did not arise by chance because its internal mechanism is complex and purposeful. Paley argued that the same applies to living organisms in general, whose existence he explained by an intelligent designer god. Instead of relying on analogy, teleological arguments can also use an inference to the best explanation: they may hold that the existence of a god is the best explanation for certain features of the world.

Arguments from morality and consciousness focus on specific features of human life. For example, some arguments from morality assume that there are objective moral values or universal moral obligations and assert that they are best explained by a divine lawgiver as the source of moral authority. Another line of argument regards religious experiences as evidence for God. Such experiences often involve non-ordinary states of awareness, such as having a vision or hearing a voice one attributes to God. Some tradition-specific arguments justify belief through the authority of holy scriptures, such as the Vedas in Hinduism or the Bible in Christianity.

Pragmatic arguments focus on beneficial consequences of theistic belief rather than evidence that theism is true. They aim to demonstrate that belief is rational because it is useful or valuable. For example, Pascal's wager recommends belief based on a comparison of possible outcomes. It argues that the cost of adopting a false belief, if there is no god, is minor compared to the potential reward of adopting a true belief, if there is a god who grants believers infinite bliss in the afterlife.

=== Against ===
A key critique of theism comes from arguments from evil, which hold that the presence of evil, understood not merely as bad intentions but also as suffering, undermines the claim that God exists. For example, such arguments may claim that an existing god would not allow innocent children to suffer from natural disasters, famine, war, and disease. Arguments from evil are typically divided into logical and evidential versions. Logical versions defend the strongest verdict: they hold that the presence of evil makes the existence of God impossible. One version asserts that an all-powerful, all-knowing, and all-benevolent being would necessarily prevent evil and concludes that such a being cannot exist given the presence of evil. Evidential arguments from evil assert that the presence of evil makes God's existence unlikely. An influential version, proposed by William Rowe, allows that some instances of intense suffering lead to greater goods. However, it holds that this is not true for every single instance: if there was an all-powerful, all-knowing, and all-benevolent being, it would probably have prevented some instances of suffering.

Another atheist argument relies on naturalism and scientific inquiry. It holds that scientific theories are superior to religious ones because they provide better explanations through rigorous methods without assuming the existence of supernatural entities. For example, challenges to various religious creation myths are posed by modern physical cosmology, which traces the development of the universe from the Big Bang to the present, and by the theory of evolution, which explains the emergence of intelligent life through natural selection rather than intelligent design. This naturalistic outlook on the world is sometimes combined with a naturalistic explanation of theistic belief, characterizing it as a psychological phenomenon that responds more to human needs or emotions than to objective truth. This type of outlook may regard theistic belief as a projection of idealized human qualities, as a delusional mechanism born of a desire for a powerful father figure, or as a social ideology that uses hope for a happy afterlife to control the masses and sustain class inequalities.

A different criticism challenges the coherence of theism, holding that the concept God involves contradictions. For example, one approach argues that the divine attribute of omnipotence is incoherent because it implies that God both can and cannot create a stone too heavy for God to lift. (Note: Another argument targets omniscience, holding that infallible divine foreknowledge is incompatible with human free will.) Other arguments seek to show that statements about God are meaningless. For instance, verificationism holds that the meaning of a statement is given by the procedures through which it could be verified, or the set of experiences that would show it to be true. When combined with the assumption that there is no such procedure for statements about God, it leads to the conclusion that they are meaningless.

Some objections do not present new evidence against theism but draw conclusions from an insufficiency of available evidence. One approach holds that the reasons for and against theism are balanced and favor neither side. Another approach, based on empiricism, maintains that there is no serious evidence for either side since evidence is limited to sensory experience, which cannot detect the presence or absence of supernatural entities. Some agnostics conclude from these considerations that knowledge is impossible and promote suspension of judgment, rejecting theism as a dogmatic stance that jumps to conclusions without a firm evidential basis. A different response argues that the absence of decisive evidence favors atheism rather than agnosticism. It maintains that the burden of proof lies with those who assert that something exists, not with those who deny it. For example, the absence of decisive evidence for the existence of unicorns is typically taken as a reason to deny their existence rather than to only suspend judgment about the issue. The argument from hiddenness also interprets the absence of decisive evidence as a reason for disbelief. It holds that if there was an all-powerful, all-knowing, and all-benevolent being, it would have provided humans with decisive evidence for its existence.

== In various fields ==
=== Religion ===
==== Abrahamic ====
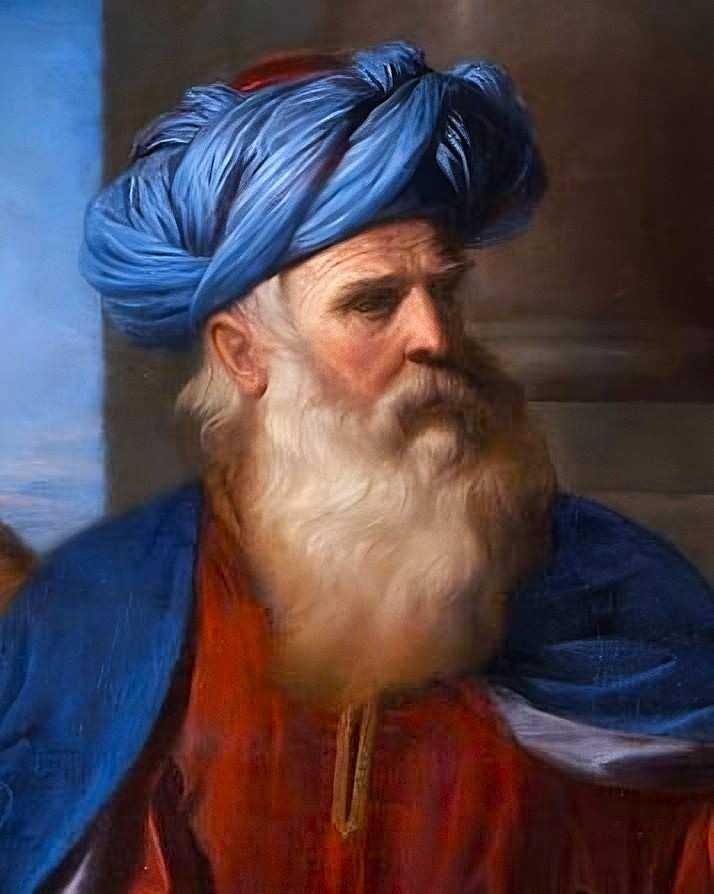
Abraham was a foundational figure of the Abrahamic religions. He is regarded as the first patriarch of the Jewish people and viewed as a model of faith and obedience to God.

Religious studies investigates how different religious traditions understand and relate to God or gods. Theism plays a central role in the Abrahamic religions. Judaism, Christianity, and Islam all embrace monotheism and share certain traditions and views, including the idea that God is all-powerful, all-knowing, and all-benevolent. They also agree that the main purpose of human life is to develop the right relationship with God. Despite the theological overlap, their conceptions of God are not identical and differ in certain respects. (Note: These differences raise the question of whether the Jewish, Christian, and Islamic perspectives represent different views of the same god or conceptions of distinct gods.)

In the Jewish tradition, God is conceived in two related ways. One outlook refers to God as Elohim, characterized as the supreme being who is the all-powerful creator of the world and the order of the universe. Another outlook emphasizes the personal relationship between God and the Jewish people, such as the covenant between God and the Israelite nation. In this context, God is referred to as YHVH or Yahweh. Judaism is strictly monotheistic: it does not believe in two distinct gods; it only uses different words to focus on different aspects. Judaism also holds that God does not have a bodily form. This idea underlies its prohibition against depicting God and worshiping idols.

Christianity emerged from Judaism and includes the Jewish Torah in its scriptures. A key difference from the Jewish conception of God is the doctrine of the Trinity: Christianity conceives God as a single being with three persons: the Father, the Son, and the Holy Spirit. (Note: Although widely accepted, the doctrine of the Trinity is rejected by a few Christian denominations.) God the Father is understood as the first person and the creator of the universe. God the Son is regarded as the second person and identified with Jesus Christ, the incarnation in whom God became human. God the Holy Spirit is seen as the third person and is associated with the Christian community. The idea of divine incarnation plays a central role in Christian theology. It holds that human salvation depends on the fact that God became human and suffered for the sins of humanity.

Islam presents itself as a continuation of the Jewish and Christian traditions, interpreting their sacred texts as earlier revelations superseded by the Quran as the final and authoritative revelation. It rejects the Christian idea of the incarnation and suffering of God. Instead, it regards Jesus as a prophet and God as an eternal being that does not suffer. Accordingly, Islamic thought rejects the doctrine of the Trinity, maintaining instead that Allah is one and indivisible. It agrees with Judaism about the incorporeal nature of God: it regards Allah as transcendent and boundless and prohibits artistic depictions and idolatry. Islamic theology holds that a proper relationship to Allah consists of faith and obedience to the divine law as stated in the Quran.

==== Indian ====
Brahma, Shiva, and Vishnu are central deities in Hinduism.

Hinduism is a family of religious traditions with a common source in a set of ancient texts: the Vedas. The Vedas, together with other Sanskrit literature, such as the Puranas and the epics, discuss various deities. Some are associated with natural forces, such as the storm deity Indra, engage in battle with demons, and are worshipped through sacrifices. Some deities also have particular cosmic functions: Brahma creates the universe at the beginning of each cosmic cycle, Vishnu preserves it, and Shiva destroys it at the cycle's end. Hindu texts also speculate about a supreme being that underlies everything. It is debated whether this theology is best described as polytheism, because it recognizes many deities, or as monotheism, interpreting the different deities as avatars or manifestations of the same supreme being. Although theism is common in Hinduism, it is not accepted by every school of thought, and some traditions are openly atheistic, such as Samkhya. Some philosophies, such as Advaita Vedanta, accept the existence of the divine, but hold that, in its highest form, it is not a personal deity but a reality beyond qualities.

Indian religious traditions that do not accept the authority of the Vedas include Jainism, Buddhism, and Sikhism. Jainism and early Buddhism are generally nontheistic: they focus on contemplative practices and self-improvement without positing a creator God. However, some later schools of Buddhism belonging to the Mahayana tradition have theistic tendencies. They may accept Buddha as a deity or worship so-called devas: higher beings that live in heavenly realms and may help humans in their spiritual development. Devas are usually not considered creator gods or omnipotent beings. Sikhism is monotheistic: it affirms the existence of a single god and holds that everything is a manifestation of this supreme being. It is often described as panentheistic since it regards God as all-encompassing and present in everything but not limited to the physical world.

==== Other traditions ====
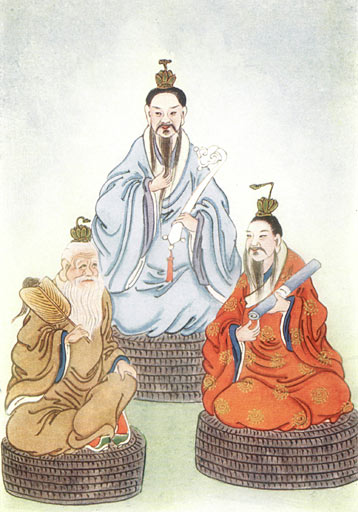
The Three Pure Ones (left) are Taoist deities, while Obatala (right) is a Yoruba deity.

Beliefs about the existence of deities are present in various East Asian religions. In China, Taoism is sometimes considered nontheistic because it regards ultimate reality not as a personal creator god but as an impersonal principle: the Tao. A different interpretation regards it as polytheistic because it accepts the existence of certain deities that arise from the Tao, such as the Three Pure Ones. In Japan, Shinto includes polytheistic and animistic beliefs. It affirms the existence of kami: deities or spirits that are associated with natural forces or may inhabit things, such as mountains and rivers.

Theistic tendencies are also found in several African religions, which often promote belief in personal deities who engage with the world. The pantheon of the ancient Egyptian religion includes many deities worshipped through ritual practices. They are often associated with particular domains of the world or functions in life. For example, Ra is the Sun god, and Osiris is the lord of the underworld. The Yoruba religion distinguishes between two interconnected domains: the physical realm, inhabited by humans, and the spiritual realm, inhabited by deities and spirits. Its supreme deities include Obatala, who creates human bodies; Olodumare, who brings consciousness to humans; (Note: Olodumare is often considered the highest deity.) and Orunmila, who knows the destiny of each human.

Theistic beliefs are also present in several new religious movements—belief systems that emerged more recently than long-established religions. They often engage in syncretism by drawing on and modifying the doctrines of established religions. While some are non-theistic, others affirm the existence of deities. Their teachings encompass various conceptions of God, including the ideas that God is an impersonal force, that God is internal to each person, or that the world is part of God. Examples of new religious movements include Godianism in Africa, the International Society for Krishna Consciousness in India, Cheondoism in Korea, and Scientology in the United States.

=== Philosophy ===
Theism is relevant to several branches of philosophy. It is a key topic in the philosophy of religion, which examines the nature of deities, analyzes divine attributes, compares different conceptions of God, and explores the relationship between the divine and the world. Another central topic in this field is the discussion of arguments for and against God's existence. Some arguments draw on pure reasoning while others include empirical observations to support or undermine theism.

Several discussions in the philosophy of religion overlap with concerns in metaphysics, the branch of philosophy interested in the fundamental nature of reality. They include questions about whether a first cause is responsible for the universe and whether there is a necessary or absolute being on which everything else depends.

Epistemology is the branch of philosophy that investigates the nature and sources of knowledge, including knowledge of God. It studies whether or how people may come to know about the existence of deities, for example, whether religious experiences involving non-ordinary awareness, such as hearing a voice attributed to God, are reliable sources of information.

Ethics studies moral phenomena and examines how people should act. Some ethical theories rely on theism, such as divine command theory, which grounds the authority of moral obligation in a divine source: God's will.

=== Anthropology and sociology ===
The anthropology of religion is interested in theistic belief as a cultural phenomenon. It examines the belief systems, social practices, and institutions associated with religion. Anthropological research also compares how religions vary across cultures and historical periods. It is closely related to the sociology of religion, which studies, among other things, the social roles and functions of belief in God. It is also interested in developments that affect belief in God and religious practices, such as secularization.

Belief in a god is a widespread global phenomenon, but there are big differences between countries. According to a 2025 study across 22 countries, the relative proportion of believers ranges from 20% in Japan to 100% in Egypt and exceeds 90% in 10 of the 22 countries. Another 2025 study, covering 35 countries, reports ranges between 33% in Sweden and 100% in Bangladesh, with a median of 83% across all 35 countries. It found particularly high rates for sub-Saharan Africa and Latin America, whereas rates in East Asia and Europe tended to be lower. Studies also indicate that belief in God varies with age (older people are more likely to believe in God than younger people) and with gender (females tend to be more religious than males). Research further suggests that the prevalence of atheism has increased during the first quarter of the 21st century.

=== Other fields ===
The psychology of religion examines the interplay between religion and mental processes. Rather than asking whether God exists, it studies the factors that influence belief in God and how this belief affects other mental processes. It includes questions about how theistic belief is motivated by or expresses a person's values, fears, hopes, and needs. A related topic concerns the effects of belief. It covers both potential benefits, such as resources for coping with difficult situations and social support through religious communities, and potential harms, such as spiritual anxiety and fear of divine punishment. The neuroscience of religion, a related discipline, investigates neural mechanisms associated with belief and religious practice.

Theism is also relevant to the field of art regarding artistic representations of the divine, including paintings, statues, music, and architecture. Artworks are used in many traditions to convey theological and moral teachings, inspire religious experiences, and aid devotional practices. They range from small depictions in household shrines to large statues in public temples. Some traditions explicitly prohibit idol representations, such as Judaism and Islam. One reason for such prohibitions is the idea that God is in a certain sense different from the physical world and that concrete depictions misrepresent God's true nature.

Theism is further pertinent to the field of politics since it can influence political institutions and debates. Theistic teachings may shape dominant views on issues such as justice, equality, welfare, and education. For example, they can sway public opinion by framing a military conflict as a holy war or by opposing it on scriptural grounds. The relation between religion and politics is particularly prominent in theocracies, political systems in which religious authorities, such as priests, have political power. Theocracies often implement religious laws and claim political legitimacy by representing God's will.

== History ==
Archaeological and ethnographic findings indicate that early roots or precursors of theism are found in prehistoric hunter-gatherer societies. For example, archaeological evidence such as gravesites, figurines, and cave paintings, combined with ethnographic observations of contemporary hunter-gatherer societies, suggests that prehistoric communities held beliefs about supernatural beings and expressed these beliefs in ritual practices. It is controversial to what extent these findings indicate belief in gods in particular, rather than belief in supernatural phenomena more generally, such as ghosts and an afterlife. A historically influential but contested model proposes a three-stage development: early humans initially hold animistic beliefs in spiritual beings inhabiting nature; these beliefs subsequently evolve into polytheism and are later superseded by monotheism.

In ancient history, various theistic belief systems emerged as civilizations formed. Ancient Mesopotamian religion, which existed by approximately 3300–3100 BCE, was polytheistic and often associated deities with natural forces and phenomena, including rivers, climate, birth, and death. Ancient Egyptian religion was also present in the fourth millennium BCE as a form of polytheism. Its later pantheon included deities such as Ra and Osiris. In ancient India, the first parts of the Vedas were composed in the second millennium BCE and discuss deities such as Indra and Agni. Other forms of theism in the second and first millennia BCE were the ancient Greek religion, with gods such as Zeus and Poseidon; Zoroastrianism in Iran, which has both monotheistic and dualistic tendencies; Chinese folk religion, including belief in Shangdi, understood as the highest deity that rules over all others; and Judaism, which developed into a strict form of monotheism. Judaism was a major influence on Christianity, which arose in the first century CE. The ancient period also saw the emergence of natural theology in Greek philosophy, such as Plato's (c. 427 – c. 347 BCE) idea of a divine craftsman who created the ordered cosmos, and Aristotle's (384–322 BCE) description of an unmoved mover that explains all motion without being itself moved by something else.

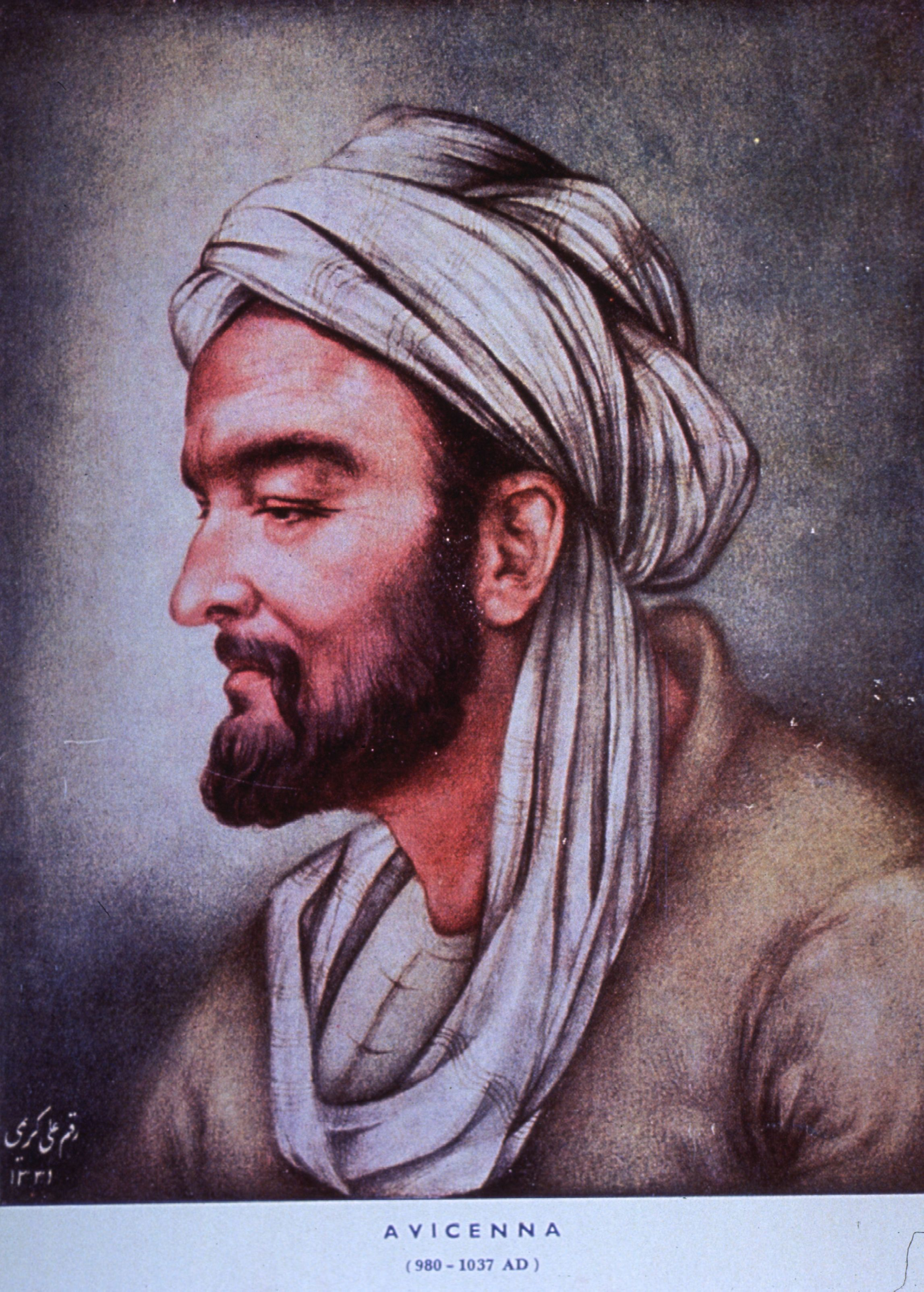
Avicenna argued that God exists because there needs to be a necessary being on which all contingent beings depend.

In the post-classical period, Islam originated in seventh-century Arabia, drawing on and modifying the teachings of Judaism and Christianity. Islamic theologians in the kalam tradition examined the correct interpretation of the Quran and defended its doctrines, addressing questions about God's nature and relation to humans. Islamic philosophers in the falsafa tradition explored a broader range of theological topics not limited to the interpretation of the Quran. For example, Avicenna (980–1037) proposed a proof of God's existence by arguing that all worldly beings are contingent and depend on a necessary being: God. In the Christian tradition, Anselm of Canterbury (1033–1109) developed the ontological argument for God's existence, and Thomas Aquinas (1225–1274) explored several arguments known as his Five Ways. The Jewish philosopher Maimonides (c. 1135–1204) advocated apophatic theology, arguing that God can be described only in negative terms by stating what God is not. In Indian thought, Adi Shankara (c. eighth century) developed the school of Advaita Vedanta, which held that ultimate reality is essentially one: an all-encompassing divine that transcends all attributes and distinctions. Dvaita Vedanta, formulated by Madhva (c. 13th century), rejected this view, arguing instead that God is distinct from individual souls and the material world. In the 15th or 16th century, Sikhism arose and affirmed belief in a single creator God.

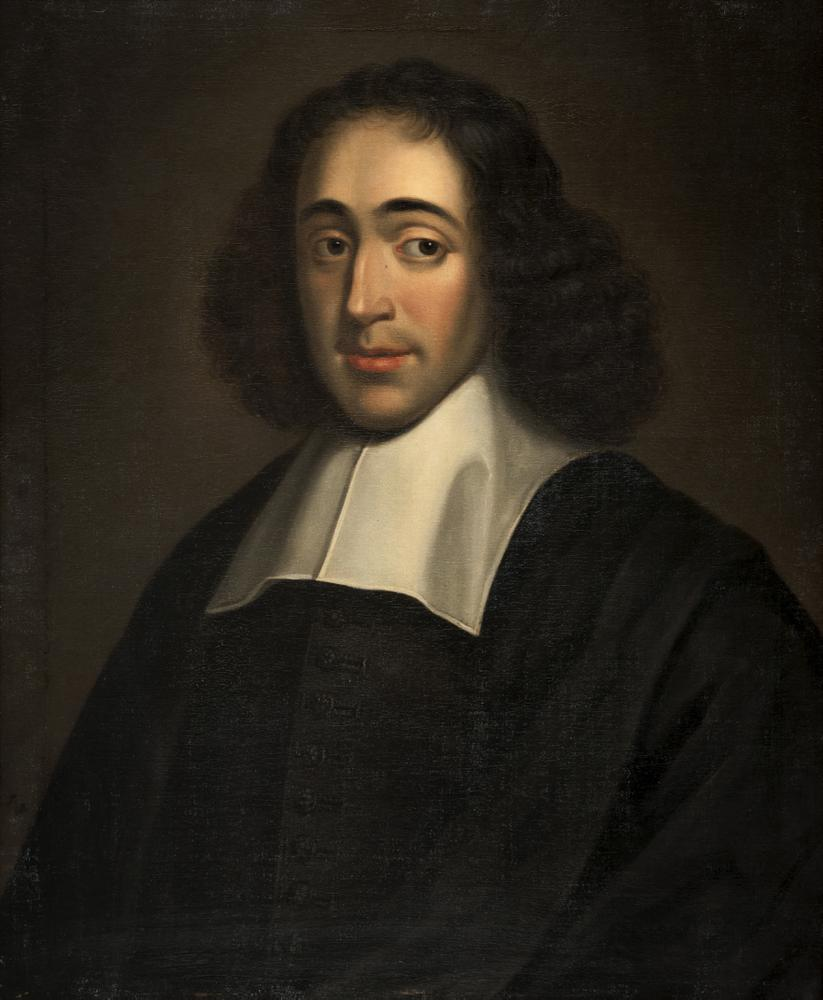
According to the pantheism of Baruch Spinoza, God is identical to the world.

In the modern period, the Scientific Revolution and the Age of Enlightenment challenged traditional sources of religious authority, contributing to secularization while also promoting alternative conceptions of God that favor natural reason over revelation, such as deism. Blaise Pascal (1623–1662) argued that one should believe in God because of potential practical benefits even if certain knowledge is not possible. Gottfried Wilhelm Leibniz (1646–1716) proposed a solution to the problem of evil, arguing that God always chooses the best of all possible worlds, which can still contain evil. Baruch Spinoza (1632–1677) developed a form of pantheism according to which God is identical to nature. David Hume (1711–1776) and Immanuel Kant (1724–1804) questioned the possibility of proving God's existence through sensory experience and pure reason, criticizing several traditional arguments.

In the 19th century, thinkers such as Ludwig Feuerbach (1804–1872) and Karl Marx (1818–1883) explained belief in God through psychological or social mechanisms rather than seeing it as a response to a divine reality. The 19th and 20th centuries saw the emergence of novel theistic teachings in the form of new religious movements, such as the Baháʼí Faith, Cheondoism, and Godianism. (Note: Some definitions limit the term new religious movements to more recent belief systems that formed after the Second World War.) Alfred North Whitehead (1861–1947) and Charles Hartshorne (1897–2000) developed process theology, while philosophers such as J. L. Mackie (1917–1981), William L. Rowe (1931–2015), Alvin Plantinga (born 1932), and Richard Swinburne (born 1934) developed new arguments for and against God's existence. In the 21st century, thinkers associated with New Atheism criticized belief in God, often using science-based arguments.

== See also ==
- Gottgläubig – Non-denominationalism in Nazi Germany
- Theistic evolution – View that combines evolutionary science with theism
