= Divine freedom =

Property of a god having free will

Divine freedom is the concept that God is a person and has free will.

One argument advanced against the concept of divine freedom is that it may contradict the principle of omnibenevolence, by limiting God's choices to only actions with perfectly good consequences.

According to saint Augustine of Hippo, since evil is absence of being and of perfection, the fact that God is the Highest does not limit His perfection, being, or freedom.

== See also ==
- Absence of good
- Argument from free will
- Euthyphro dilemma
- Modal collapse
- Perfection § Ontology and theology
