= Argument from nonbelief =

Philosophical argument that asserts an inconsistency with nonbelief and God's existence

The argument from nonbelief is a philosophical argument for the nonexistence of God that asserts an inconsistency between God's existence and a world that fails to recognize such an entity. It is similar to the classic argument from evil in arguing that there is an inconsistency between the world that exists and God's existence. The argument is key in philosophical discussions about divine hiddenness.

There are three key varieties of the argument. The argument from reasonable nonbelief (or the argument from divine hiddenness) was first elaborated in J. L. Schellenberg's 1993 book Divine Hiddenness and Human Reason. According to this argument, if God existed (and was perfectly good and loving) every reasonable person would have been brought to believe in God, but since there are reasonable nonbelievers, it follows that God does not exist.

Theodore Drange subsequently developed the argument from nonbelief, based on the mere existence of nonbelief in God. Drange considers the distinction between reasonable (by which Schellenberg means inculpable) and unreasonable (culpable) nonbelief to be irrelevant and confusing. Nevertheless, the overwhelming majority of academic discussion is concerned with Schellenberg's formulation.

Schellenberg's formulation, however, has evolved since his 1993 book. Contemporary versions of the argument no longer trade on inculpable nonbelief or deal with God's goodness. Rather, the argument from nonresistant nonbelief (or the contemporary hiddenness argument) argues that if God exists, then no one would ever be in a state of nonresistant nonbelief (that is, a state in which they do not believe in God's existence despite not resisting him in any way), but since some people have been in such a state, God does not exist. The basic engine behind this argument is the idea that God, being unsurpassably loving, would always make it possible for any such capable persons as there may be to begin a relationship with him just by trying. To begin a relationship, according to Schellenberg, both parties must know about the other's existence. Therefore, God would never allow any capable person to be in a state of nonresistant nonbelief at any time.

== Schellenberg's hiddenness argument ==
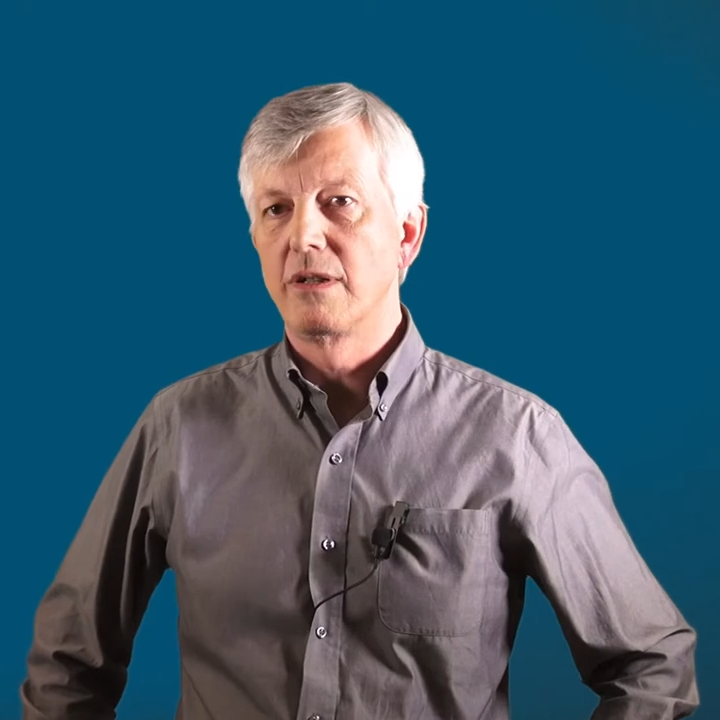
J.L. Schellenberg

Discussion of Schellenberg's argument has made explicit a non-theological use of the term 'hiddenness', which is now commonly used simply as a way of talking about the subjective condition of nonbelief in God. In his first presentation of the argument Schellenberg emphasized inculpable or reasonable nonbelief, but he has since shifted to speaking more specifically about nonresistant nonbelief. The first presentation is often given by commentators as follows, based on Schellenberg's own summing up:

1. If there is a God, he is perfectly loving.
2. If a perfectly loving God exists, reasonable nonbelief does not occur.
3. Reasonable nonbelief occurs.
4. No perfectly loving God exists (from 2 and 3).
5. Hence, there is no God (from 1 and 4).

Schellenberg has stated that this formulation is misleading, when taken on its own, because it does not make explicit the reason why a perfectly loving God would want to prevent nonbelief. His deepest claim, he says, is "about the connection between love and openness to relationship—a personal and positively meaningful and explicit sort of relationship of the sort that logically presupposes each party's belief in the other's existence." A later presentation of the argument by Schellenberg, which aims at accessibility for students, includes this element:

1. If no perfectly loving God exists, then God does not exist.
2. If a perfectly loving God exists, then there is a God who is always open to personal relationship with each human person.
3. If there is a God who is always open to personal relationship with each human person, then no human person is ever non-resistantly unaware that God exists.
4. If a perfectly loving God exists, then no human person is ever non-resistantly unaware that God exists (from 2 and 3).
5. Some human persons are non-resistantly unaware that God exists.
6. No perfectly loving God exists (from 4 and 5).
7. God does not exist (from 1 and 6).

In an article revisiting the argument ten years after it was originally proposed, Schellenberg observes that criticism has mainly centered around the idea that God would prevent inculpable nonbelief. He asserts that there are relatively few criticisms questioning the existence of inculpable nonbelief, and almost no theistic philosopher objects to the idea that God is perfectly loving.

=== God is perfectly loving ===
Schellenberg says he has not seen any serious objections to this premise by theistic philosophers, but there certainly are other conceptions of God. Daniel Howard-Snyder writes about the possibility of believing in an unsurpassably great personal god that is nevertheless dispassionate towards its creatures. Drawing on the Stoic concept of Eudaimonia, he says one can think of a god more akin to a wise sage than the loving parent that Schellenberg envisions.

Theodore Drange, in his attempt to improve the argument (see below), states that there are many theists who do not view God as perfectly loving, and "some Christians think of him as an angry deity bent on punishing people for their sins." Drange concludes that the argument should be put forward only in relation to theists who already accept the first premise and believe in a god who is perfectly loving.

Most theists, in fact, do say that love is a central concept and God is directly associated with love. Theologians such as N.T. Wright suggest that our experience of love is itself a proof of God's existence. However, there are a few others (e.g. Brian Davies in the Thomist tradition) who suggest that the modern interpretation of what it means to say God loves human beings is incorrect, and so that God is able to be loving in a sense while actually willing disbelief.

=== Nonresistant nonbelief, lack of evidence, and sin ===
When asked what he would say when facing God on judgment day, Bertrand Russell famously replied that he would say "Not enough evidence, God! Not enough evidence!" Some nonbelievers may have hidden from themselves what seems to them to be possible evidence of the divine, but the view of the hiddenness argument is that others have tried hard to believe in God. Schellenberg addresses this difference with his distinction between culpable and inculpable nonbelief, with the latter defined as "non-belief that exists through no fault of the non-believer."

Historically, the Calvinist tradition has placed the blame on nonbelievers, who are predestined by God towards nonbelief. Calvin's religious epistemology is based on the sensus divinitatis (Sense of Divinity), the view that the presence of God is universally perceived by all humans. Paul Helm explains, "Calvin's use of the term 'sense' signals that the knowledge of God is a common human endowment; mankind is created not only as capable of knowing God, but as actually knowing him." According to this tradition, there is no inculpable or nonresistant nonbelief. Jonathan Edwards, the 18th century American theologian, claimed that while every human being has been granted the capacity to know God, successful use of these capacities requires an attitude of "true benevolence", a divinely gifted willingness to be open to the truth about God. Thus, the failure of non-believers to see "divine things" is in his view due to "a dreadful stupidity of mind, occasioning a sottish insensibility of their truth and importance."

=== Demographics of theism and the problem of natural nonbelief ===
In modern times, there are fewer proponents of these views. One reason is that, as Stephen Maitzen argues, anthropology has long established that while religious belief in general is essentially universal, belief in what Calvin would recognize as God is very unevenly distributed among cultures (consider for example God in Buddhism, Jain cosmology, or non-theistic animism). If God exists, then why, Maitzen asks, does the prevalence of belief in God vary so dramatically with cultural and national boundaries? Jason Marsh has extended this kind of demographic challenge by focusing on human evolution and cognitive science of religion. Why is theistic belief apparently non-existent among early humans but common at later times, at least in some regions? According to Marsh, the hiddenness problem is harder to answer once we appreciate that much nonbelief is 'natural', owing to the kinds of minds people naturally possess and to their place in evolutionary and cultural history.

Another reason why many philosophers no longer attribute nonbelief to human sinfulness has to do with respect. In fact, modern critics, such as Howard-Snyder, who praised Schellenberg's book for being "religiously sensitive," are similarly sensitive towards the nonbeliever. Howard-Snyder wrote:

Even though some nonbelievers lack true benevolence, the empirical evidence strongly suggests that others possess it since they really do earnestly seek the truth about God, love the Good, assess evidence judiciously, and, if anything, display a prejudice for God, not against Him.

=== Would a perfectly loving God prevent nonresistant nonbelief? ===
The most serious criticisms of the hiddenness argument have been leveled against the idea that a perfectly loving God would prevent nonresistant nonbelief. Schellenberg argues in two steps, by first claiming that a loving God would enable humans to partake in a relationship with it, and then, assuming that belief in that god is a necessary condition for such relationships to occur, inferring that a loving God would not permit nonbelief. He states:

There is, first of all, the claim that if there is a personal God who is perfectly loving, creatures capable of explicit and positively meaningful relationship with God, who have not freely shut themselves off from God, are always in a position to participate in such relationship—able to do so just by trying to.

He justifies this claim by arguing that a conception of divine love can best be formed by extrapolating the best aspects of love in human relations, and draws an analogy with perfect parental love:

The perfectly loving parent, for example, from the time the child can first respond to her at all until death separates them, will, insofar as she can help it, see to it that nothing she does ever puts relationship with herself out of reach for her child.

But, says Schellenberg, belief in God's existence is necessary for engaging in such a meaningful relationship with God. He therefore concludes that if there is a perfectly loving God, such creatures will always believe in it. He further argues that since belief is involuntary, these creatures should always have evidence "causally sufficient" for such belief:

The presence of God will be for them like a light that—however much the degree of its brightness may fluctuate—remains on unless they close their eyes.

== Objections and counterarguments ==
=== Skeptical theism ===
Skeptical theism is the view that we should remain skeptical of claims that our perceptions about God's purposes can reasonably be considered good evidence of what they are. The central thesis of skeptical theism is that it would not be surprising for an infinitely intelligent and knowledgeable being's reasons for permitting a perception of evil or alleged hiddenness to be beyond human comprehension.^{[2]} That is, what is perceived as hiddenness may be necessary for a greater good or to prevent equal or even greater evils.

Schellenberg has responded to skeptical theism (i.e. noseeum/unknown-purpose defense). First, Schellenberg says that he has given known reasons to think that a perfectly loving being would always be open to a personal relationship; ipso facto, God would not sacrifice some time in the relationship for the sake of unknown greater goods, and if the greatest good for finite creatures is to be in a relationship with God, then God would not sacrifice that for the sake of unknown greater goods. Finally, Schellenberg's position is that all known and unknown goods are ultimately in God; hence, God can bring about unknown greater goods without hiddenness.

==== Unknown purpose defense ====
Alvin Plantinga writes that the statement "We can see no good reason for God to do X" only implies "There is no good reason for God to do X" on the assumption that "If there were a good reason for God to do X, we would be able to see it," which he suggests is absurd. This point might be applied to versions of the argument from nonbelief that suggest without support that there is no good reason for God to permit nonbelief. Critics of Plantinga might suggest that if nobody is able to present an apparently good reason for God to allow nonbelief, then it is less ad hoc to merely posit God's non-existence, or indifference to people's belief, to explain this inability, than to posit both the existence of a God who cares about people's beliefs as well as some unthinkable reason obvious only to God to remain hidden.

==== Noseeum defense ====
The philosophers Michael Bergmann and Michael Rea described the philosopher William Rowe's justification for the second premise of the argument from evil, which is equally applicable to a perception of hiddenness:

Some evidential arguments ... rely on a "noseeum" inference of the following sort: NI: If, after thinking hard, we can't think of any God-justifying reason for permitting some horrific evil then it is likely that there is no such reason. (The reason NI is called a 'noseeum' inference is that it says, more or less, that because we don't see 'um, they probably ain't there.)

Various analogies are offered to show that the noseeum inference is logically unsound. For example, a novice chess player's inability to discern a chess master's choice of moves cannot be used to infer that there is no good reason for the move. The skeptical theist and noseeum defense place the burden of proof on the atheist to prove that their intuitions about God are trustworthy.

=== Unreasonable demands on God ===
This argument is sometimes seen as demanding God to prove his existence, for example by performing miracles. Critics have argued that even in Schellenberg's more refined version, the nonbeliever is imposing their own epistemological expectations on the will of God. A detailed discussion of these kinds of demands, and their moral and spiritual implications, is provided by Paul Moser, who says that such demands amount to cognitive idolatry. He defines idolatry as "our not letting the true God be Lord in our lives" and instead committing to something other than God by pursuing a quest for self-realization in our own terms. If this is idolatry in our actions, then idolatry in our knowing, he says, is as follows:

Cognitive idolatry relies on a standard for knowledge that excludes the primacy of the morally self-transforming knowledge of God central to knowing God as Lord. It rests on an epistemological standard, whether empiricist, rationalist, or some hybrid, that does not let God be Lord. Such idolatry aims to protect one's lifestyle from serious challenge by the God who calls, convicts, and reconciles. It disallows knowledge of God as personal subject and Lord to whom we are morally and cognitively responsible. It allows at most for knowledge of God as an undemanding object of human knowledge.

Schellenberg considers this criticism irrelevant to the argument, which in his opinion, does not impose any demands for demonstrations of God's power, but rather looks for evidence that "need only be such as will be causally sufficient for belief in the absence of resistance... This result might be effected through the much more spiritually appropriate means of religious experience, interpreted in the sensitive manner of a Pascal or a Kierkegaard." Schellenberg then expresses a certain frustration that theistic writers who otherwise extol the value of religious experiences deny non-theists the right to do so.

=== Soul-making theodicy ===
John Hick used the term "soul-making" in his theodicy Evil and the God of Love to describe the kind of spiritual development that he believes justifies the existence of evil. This defense is employed by Michael Murray, who explains how, in his view, divine hiddenness is essential to soul-making. It may seem that it is not hard to imagine a world where God is known and yet believers act freely with ample opportunities for spiritual development. But Murray gives a deep and careful analysis of the argument, concluding that if God's existence were revealed in such a way as to remove reasonable non-belief, then "any desire that we might have to believe or act in ways contrary to that which has been revealed would be overwhelmed."

Critics note here that, for example, in Christianity (and even more in Judaism, where God is represented as talking to Job and explaining why he is just), God is already believed to have exposed himself very distinctly: for example to the Apostles who saw his resurrection. One theistic explanation of this might be that God knows some people would not believe anyway but if God knows this before creating, there is a problem about God's liability for what is created.

=== There really are no atheists defense ===
This argument posits that all true atheists are, at their core, lying in order to live in a way that contradicts God's commands, as seen in certain interpretations of Romans 1:18-25. Critics point out that there are atheists who are genuinely not lying and are not using their atheism as an excuse to sin. However, proponents argue that atheists could still be deceiving themselves, even if they are not lying to others. Additionally, others contend that the argument fails to address Jason Marsh's point about natural nonbelief in early humans. Since it is plausible that natural nonbelief existed in early humans, it doesn't make sense to claim that such nonbelief is self-deceptive. Natural nonbelief, they argue, entails nonresistant nonbelief.

=== Turning the tables ===
Like with the argument from evil, one can "flip" the argument from divine hiddenness. In other words, one can argue that the fact that many or most people believe that God exists (and/or have experiences of God) is evidence that God does exist.

== Drange's argument from nonbelief ==
Theodore Drange proposed a version of the nonbelief argument in 1996. He considers the distinction between culpable and inculpable nonbelief to be unhelpful in the argument, arguing instead that the mere existence of nonbelief is evidence against the existence of God. A semi-formal presentation of the argument is as follows:

1. If God exists, God:
  1. wants all humans to believe God exists before they die;
  2. can bring about a situation in which all humans believe God exists before they die;
  3. does not want anything that would conflict with and be at least as important as its desire for all humans to believe God exists before they die; and
  4. always acts in accordance with what it most wants.
2. If God exists, all humans would believe so before they die (from 1).
3. But not all humans believe God exists before they die.
4. Therefore, God does not exist (from 2 and 3).

Drange's argument is directed primarily to Christians, and the philosopher Laura Garcia has replied from that perspective. She says that Drange's argument hinges on the idea that belief in God's existence is, according to Christians, necessary for salvation. According to Garcia this idea is mistaken: "many Christians deny this claim and the Catholic Church explicitly rejects it." But as Garcia notes, Drange has answered that for many Christians—in particular, evangelical Christians—his point should remain convincing, and that there are in any case other good things that belief in God can bring for humans, which a good God would desire, such as peace of mind and a sense of meaning in life.

== See also ==
- Vincible and invincible ignorance – Concepts in Catholic moral theology
- Fate of the unlearned – Eschatological question
- Divine hiddenness
- Non-identity problem
