= Contingency (philosophy) =

Possible truths which are not necessary

In logic, contingency is the feature of a statement making it neither necessary nor impossible. Contingency is a fundamental concept of modal logic. Modal logic concerns the manner, or mode, in which statements are true. Contingency is one of three basic modes alongside necessity and impossibility. In modal logic, a contingent statement stands in the modal realm between what is necessary and what is impossible, never crossing into the territory of either status. Contingent and necessary statements form the complete set of possible statements. While this definition is widely accepted, the precise distinction (or lack thereof) between what is contingent and what is necessary has been challenged since antiquity.

== Contingency and modal possibility ==
In logic, a thing is considered to be possible when it is true in at least one possible world. This means there is a way to imagine a world in which a statement is true and in which its truth does not contradict any other truth in that world. If it were impossible, there would be no way to conceive such a world: the truth of any impossible statement must contradict some other fact in that world. Contingency is not impossible, so a contingent statement is therefore one which is true in at least one possible world. But contingency is also not necessary, so a contingent statement is false in at least one possible world.^{α} While contingent statements are false in at least one possible world, possible statements are not also defined this way. Since necessary statements are a kind of possible statement (e.g. 2=2 is possible and necessary), then to define possible statements as 'false in some possible world' is to affect the definition of necessary statements. Since necessary statements are never false in any possible world, then some possible statements are never false in any possible world. So the idea that a statement might ever be false and yet remain an unrealized possibility is entirely reserved to contingent statements alone. While all contingent statements are possible, not all possible statements are contingent. The truth of a contingent statement is consistent with all other truths in a given world, but not necessarily so. They are always possible in every imaginable world but not always true^{β} in every imaginable world.

This distinction begins to reveal the ordinary English meaning of the word "contingency", in which the truth of one thing depends on the truth of another. On the one hand, the mathematical idea that a sum of two and two is four is always possible and always true, which makes it necessary and therefore not contingent. This mathematical truth does not depend on any other truth, it is true by definition. On the other hand, since a contingent statement is always possible but not necessarily true, we can always conceive it to be false in a world in which it is also always logically achievable. In such a world, the contingent idea is never necessarily false since this would make it impossible in that world. But if it's false and yet still possible, this means the truths or facts in that world would have to change in order for the contingent truth to become actualized. When a statement's truth depends on this kind of change, it is contingent: possible but dependent on whatever facts are actually taking place in a given world.

== Contingency and modal necessity ==
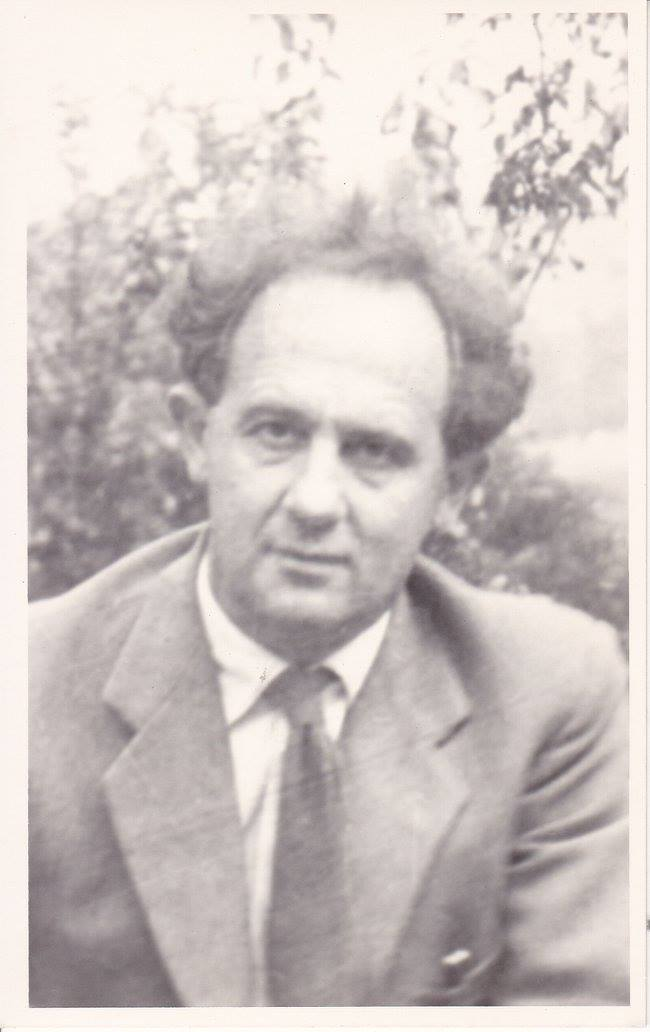
The statement "If all objects are physical, and A. N. Prior exists, then A. N. Prior is physical" may be logically true by form, but not necessarily true.

Some philosophical distinctions are used to examine the line between contingent and necessary statements. These include analytic and epistemic distinctions as well as the modal distinctions already noted. But there is not always agreement about exactly what these distinctions mean or how they are used. Philosophers such as Jaakko Hintikka and Arthur Pap consider the concept of analytic truths, for example (as distinct from synthetic ones) to be ambiguous since in practice they are defined or used in different ways. And while Saul Kripke stipulates that analytic statements are always necessary and a priori, Edward Zalta claims that there are examples in which analytic statements are not necessary. Kripke uses the example of a meter stick to support the idea that some a priori truths are contingent.

In Time and Modality, A. N. Prior argues that a cross-examination between the basic principles of modal logic and those of quantificational logic seems to require that "whatever exists exists necessarily". He says this threatens the definition of contingent statements as non-necessary things when one generically intuits that some of what exists does so contingently, rather than necessarily. Harry Deutsch acknowledged Prior's concern and outlines rudimentary notes about a "Logic for Contingent Beings." Deutsch believes that the solution to Prior's concern begins by removing the assumption that logical statements are necessary. He believes the statement format, "If all objects are physical, and Φ exists, then Φ is physical," is logically true by form but is not necessarily true if Φ rigidly designates, for example, a specific person who is not alive.

== Future contingency ==
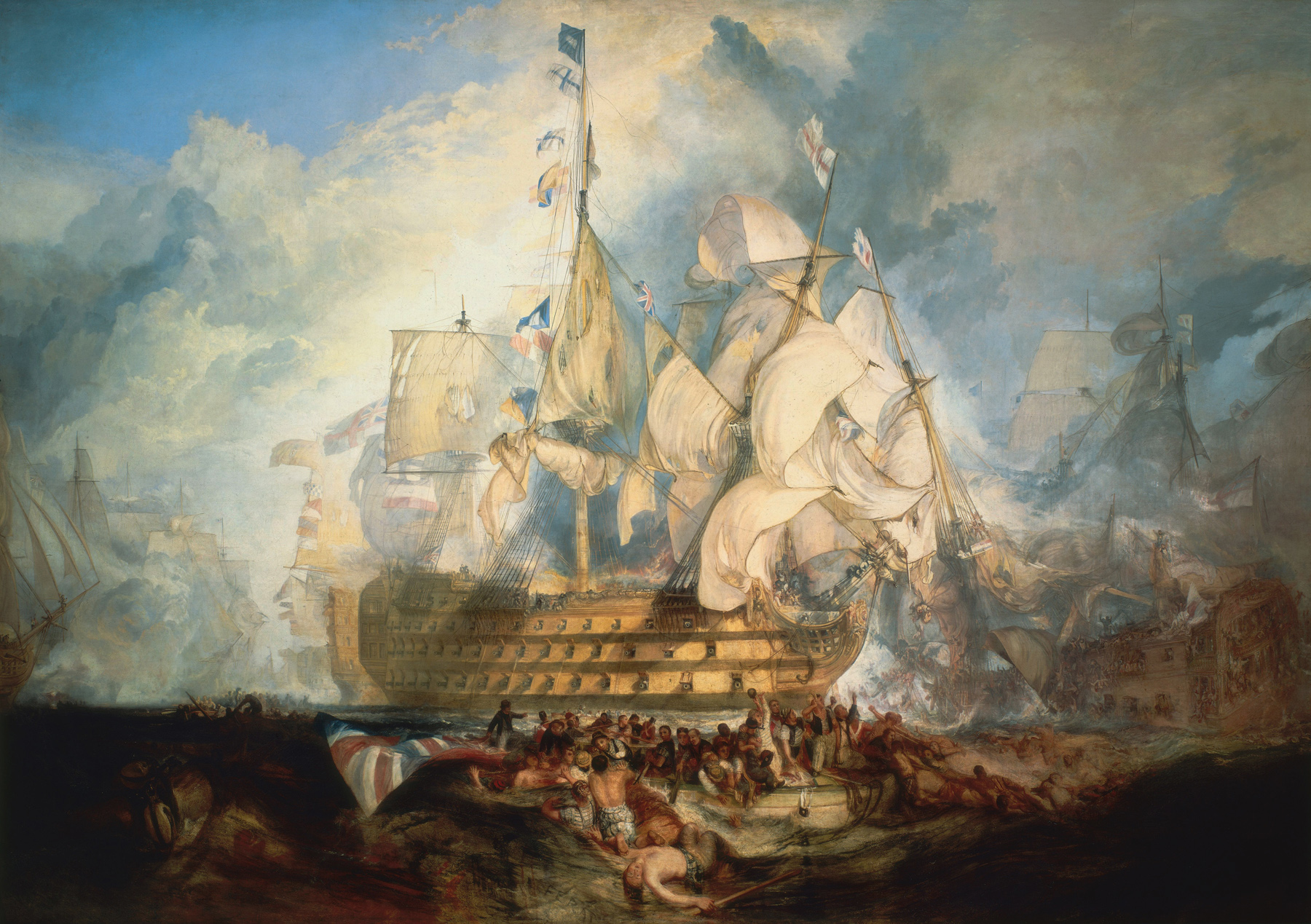
Aristotle's example of a sea battle as a future contingent demonstrates the paradox of the modal fallacy.

=== Problem of future contingency ===
In chapter 9 of De Interpretatione, Aristotle observes an apparent paradox in the nature of contingency. He considers that while the truth values of contingent past- and present-tense statements can be expressed in pairs of contradictions to represent their truth or falsity, this may not be the case of contingent future-tense statements. Aristotle asserts that if this were the case for future contingent statements as well, some of them would be necessarily true, a fact which seems to contradict their contingency. Aristotle's intention with these claims breaks down into two primary readings of his work. The first view, considered notably by Boethius, supposes that Aristotle's intentions were to argue against this logical determinism only by claiming future contingent statements are neither true nor false. This reading of Aristotle regards future contingents as simply disqualified from possessing any truth value at all until they are actualized. The opposing view, with an early version from Cicero, is that Aristotle was not attempting to disqualify assertoric statements about future contingents from being either true or false, but that their truth value was indeterminant. This latter reading takes future contingents to possess a truth value, one which is necessary but which is unknown. This view understands Aristotle to be saying that while some event's occurrence at a specified time was necessary, a fact of necessity which could not have been known to us, its occurrence at simply any time was not necessary.

=== Determinism and foreknowledge ===
Medieval thinkers studied logical contingency as a way to analyze the relationship between Early Modern conceptions of God and the modal status of the world qua His creation. Early Modern writers studied contingency against the freedom of the Christian Trinity not to create the universe or set in order a series of natural events. In the 16th century, European Reformed Scholasticism subscribed to John Duns Scotus' idea of synchronic contingency, which attempted to remove perceived contradictions between necessity, human freedom and the free will of God to create the world. In the 17th Century, Baruch Spinoza in his Ethics states that a thing is called contingent when "we do not know whether the essence does or does not involve a contradiction, or of which, knowing that it does not involve a contradiction, we are still in doubt concerning the existence, because the order of causes escape us". Further, he states, "It is in the nature of reason to perceive things under a certain form of eternity as necessary and it is only through our imagination that we consider things, whether in respect to the future or the past, as contingent".

The eighteenth-century philosopher Jonathan Edwards in his work A Careful and Strict Enquiry into the Modern Prevailing Notions of that Freedom of Will which is supposed to be Essential to Moral Agency, Virtue and Vice, Reward and Punishment, Praise and Blame (1754), reviewed the relationships between action, determinism, and personal culpability. Edwards begins his argument by establishing the ways in which necessary statements are made in logic. He identifies three ways necessary statements can be made for which only the third kind can legitimately be used to make necessary claims about the future. This third way of making necessary statements involves conditional or consequential necessity, such that if a contingent outcome could be caused by something that was necessary, then this contingent outcome could be considered necessary itself "by a necessity of consequence". Prior interprets Edwards by supposing that any necessary consequence of any already necessary truth would "also 'always have existed,' so that it is only by a necessary connexion (sic) with 'what has already come to pass' that what is still merely future can be necessary." Further, in Past, Present, and Future, Prior attributes an argument against the incompatibility of God's foreknowledge or foreordaining with future contingency to Edward's Enquiry.

== See also ==
- Conceptual necessity
- Indeterminism
- Logical possibility
- Metaphysical necessity
- Modal collapse
- Modal fallacy
- Modal logic
- Subjunctive possibility

== Notes ==
- ^αWhen a statement is false in at least one possible world, this does not mean there is always some world in which it is literally false, only that there is some imaginable world in which a statement is literally false and that this would not contradict some other truth in that imaginable world.
- ^β"Always true" means "tautologically true" or "necessarily true" since if a contingent truth is possible in every world it may happen to be true in every possible world but not as a matter of tautological necessity, only as a matter of coincidence.

== Sources ==
- Ackrill, J. L. (1963). Aristotle, Categories and De Interpretatione: Translated with Notes and Glossary. Clarendon Press. ISBN 0-19-872086-6.
- Anscombe, G. E. M. (1956). "Aristotle and the Sea Battle: De Interpretatione 9". Mind. doi:10.1093/mind/65.1.1.
- Craig, William Lane (1988), The Problem of Divine Foreknowledge and Future Contingents from Aristotle to Suarez, Brill's Studies in Intellectual History, Leiden: Brill
- Deutsch, Harry (1990). "Contingency and Modal Logic". Philosophical Studies. 60 (1–2). Springer Science + Business Media: 89–102. doi:10.1007/BF00370979. JSTOR 4320149.
- Edwards, Jonathan (1754). A Careful and Strict Enquiry into the Modern Prevailing Notions of that Freedom of Will which is supposed to be Essential to Moral Agency, Virtue and Vice, Reward and Punishment, Praise and Blame (5th ed.). J. Murgatroyd.
- Fine, Gail (1984). "Truth and Necessity in De interpretatione 9". History of Philosophy Quarterly.
- Frede, Dorothea (1985). "The Sea-Battle Reconsidered : A Defense of the Traditional Interpretation". Oxford Studies in Ancient Philosophy. Oxford.
- Gensler, Harry (2017). Introduction to Logic (3rd ed.). Routledge. ISBN 9781138910584.
- Hintikka, Jaakko (1973). Time and Necessity: Studies in Aristotle's Theory of Modality. Clarendon Press. ISBN 9780198243656.
- Kripke, Saul (1980). Naming and Necessity (2nd ed.). Harvard University Press. ISBN 0-674-59845-8.
- Lewis, David (1986). On the Plurality of Worlds. Blackwell. ISBN 9780631224266.
- Omodeo, Pietro Daniel (September 19, 2019). "Secundum Quid and Contingentia: Scholastic Reminiscences in Early Modern Mechanics". In Omodeo, Pietro Daniel; Garau, Rodolfo (eds.). Contingency and Natural Order in Early Modern Science. Boston Studies in the Philosophy and History of Science. Vol. 332. Springer. pp. 157–180. doi:10.1007/978-3-319-67378-3_8. ISBN 9783319673783. OCLC 1119640000. S2CID 203491340.
- Prior, Arthur (1957). Time and Modality. Oxford University Press. ISBN 9780198241584.
- Prior, Arthur (1967). Past, Present and Future (1st ed.). Oxford University Press. ISBN 9780198243113.
- Sorabji, Richard (1980). Necessity, Cause and Blame: Perspectives on Aristotle's Theory. Cornell University Press. ISBN 9780801492440.
- Zalta, Edward (1988), Logical and Analytic Truths That Are Not Necessary (PDF), 85, vol. 2, Journal of Philosophy
- Zalta, Edward (1995), Basic Concepts in Modal Logic (PDF), Stanford Metaphysics Research Lab
