= Modal fallacy =

Type of fallacy in modal logic

The modal fallacy or modal scope fallacy is a type of formal fallacy that occurs in modal logic. It is the fallacy of placing a proposition in the wrong modal scope, most commonly confusing the scope of what is necessarily true. A statement is considered necessarily true if and only if it is impossible for the statement to be untrue and that there is no situation that would cause the statement to be false. Some philosophers further argue that a necessarily true statement must be true in all possible worlds.

In modal logic, a proposition $P$ can be necessarily true or false (denoted $\Box P$ and $\Box\lnot P$, respectively), meaning that it is necessary that it is true or false; or it could be possibly true or false (denoted $\diamond P$ and $\diamond\lnot P$), meaning that it is true or false, but it is not logically necessary that it is so: its truth or falseness is contingent. The modal fallacy occurs when there is a confusion of the distinction between the two.

A fallacy of necessity is an informal fallacy in the logic of a syllogism whereby a degree of unwarranted necessity is placed in the conclusion.

== Description ==
In modal logic, there is an important distinction between what is logically necessary to be true and what is true but not logically necessary to be so. One common form is replacing $p \rightarrow q$ with $p \rightarrow \Box q$. In the first statement, $q$ is true given $p$ but is not logically necessary to be so.

== Examples ==
a) Bachelors are necessarily unmarried.
b) John is a bachelor.
Therefore, c) John cannot marry.

The condition a) appears to be a tautology and therefore true. The condition b) is a statement of fact about John which makes him subject to a); that is, b) declares John a bachelor, and a) states that all bachelors are unmarried.

Because c) presumes b) will always be the case, it is a fallacy of necessity. John, of course, is always free to stop being a bachelor, simply by getting married; if he does so, b) is no longer true and thus not subject to the tautology a). In this case, c) has unwarranted necessity by assuming, incorrectly, that John cannot stop being a bachelor. Formally speaking, this type of argument equivocates between the de dicto necessity of a) and the de re necessity of c). The argument is only valid if both a) and c) are construed de re. This, however, would undermine the argument, as a) is only a tautology de dicto – indeed, interpreted de re, it is false. Using the formal symbolism in modal logic, the de dicto expression $\Box (Bx\rightarrow\neg Mx)$ is a tautology, while the de re expression $Bx\rightarrow \Box\neg Mx$ is false.

Norman Swartz gave the following example of how the modal fallacy can lead one to conclude that the future is already set, regardless of one's decisions; this is based on the "sea battle" example used by Aristotle to discuss the problem of future contingents in his On Interpretation:

Two admirals, A and B, are preparing their navies for a sea battle tomorrow. The battle will be fought until one side is victorious. But the 'laws' of the excluded middle (no third truth-value) and of non-contradiction (not both truth-values), mandate that one of the propositions, 'A wins' and 'B wins', is true (always has been and ever will be) and the other is false (always has been and ever will be). Suppose 'A wins' is today true. Then whatever A does (or fails to do) today will make no difference; similarly, whatever B does (or fails to do) today will make no difference: the outcome is already settled. Or again, suppose 'A wins' is today false. Then no matter what A does today (or fails to do), it will make no difference; similarly, no matter what B does (or fails to do), it will make no difference: the outcome is already settled. Thus, if propositions bear their truth-values timelessly (or unchangingly and eternally), then planning, or as Aristotle put it 'taking care', is illusory in its efficacy. The future will be what it will be, irrespective of our planning, intentions, etc.

Suppose that the statement "A wins" is given by $A$ and "B wins" is given by $B$. It is true here that only one of the statements "A wins" or "B wins" must be true. In other words, only one of $\diamond A$ or $\diamond B$ is true. In logic syntax, this is equivalent to

$A \lor B$ (either $A$ or $B$ is true)

$\lnot\diamond (A \land B)$ (it is not possible that $A$ and $B$ are both true at the same time)

The fallacy here occurs because one assumes that $\diamond A$ and $\diamond B$ implies $\Box A$ and $\Box B$. Thus, one believes that, since one of both events is logically necessarily true, no action by either can change the outcome.

Swartz also argued that the argument from free will suffers from the modal fallacy.

== See also ==
- De dicto and de re: Context of modality
- Modal logic
