= Divine hiddenness =

Theological concept of God's presence

Divine hiddenness is the concept that God is hidden, silent, or even absent altogether. The theme of divine hiddenness, silence, and darkness has a rich history in Judeo-Christian and Islamic theology.

== Historical Judeo-Christian references to divine hiddenness ==
=== Old Testament ===
In the Old Testament, God is described as being hidden and as hiding. One example is Psalm 22: "My God, my God, why have you forsaken me?....I cry by day, but you do not answer...." Another is in Isaiah 45: "Truly you are a God who hides himself, O God of Israel, the Savior."

=== Anselm of Canterbury ===
Although he did not address divine hiddenness as an argument against God the way contemporary authors do, Anselm of Canterbury (1033-1109) linked divine hiddenness to an unfulfilled purpose of seeing and knowing God in his Proslogion:

I have never seen thee, O Lord my God; I do not know thy form. What, O most high Lord, shall this man do, an exile far from thee? What shall thy servant do, anxious in his love of thee, and cast out afar from thy face? He pants to see thee, and thy face is too far from him. He longs to come to thee, and thy dwelling place is inaccessible. He is eager to find thee, and knows not thy place. He desires to seek thee, and does not know thy face. Lord, thou art my God, and thou art my Lord, yet never have I seen thee. It is thou that hast made me, and hast made me anew, and hast bestowed upon me all the blessings I enjoy; and not yet do I know thee. Finally, I was created to see thee and not yet have I done that for which I was made.

Anselm further saw a theological tension between God's omnipresence and the fact that Anselm did not see God. Anselm himself did not see this as contradicting Christian belief, however, as he was a prolific Christian thinker, developing the ontological argument and contributing to work on the atonement.

== Divine hiddenness as opposed to evil ==
Peter van Inwagen has argued that divine hiddenness could be the case apart from evil. J.L. Schellenberg has also extensively argued that his hiddenness argument stands apart from arguments from evil, making hiddenness a distinct (if related) topic. Yujin Nagasawa has argued that a particularly wrenching form comes when hiddenness and evil are intermingled, which he calls "the problem of divine absence."

== Divine hiddenness in atheistic thought ==
=== Nietzsche ===
In the introduction to a volume of papers discussing whether divine hiddenness is evidence against theism, Daniel Howard-Snyder and Paul Moser cite Nietzsche's question as anticipating this contemporary theme: "a god who is all-knowing and all-powerful and who does not even make sure his creatures understand his intentions—could that be a god of goodness?"

=== Argument from nonbelief ===
The argument from nonbelief, also called the hiddenness argument, trades on divine hiddenness to argue for the nonexistence of God.

== See also ==
- Deus absconditus
- Argument from nonbelief
- Silence (Endo novel)
