= Modal collapse =

Concept in modal logic

In modal logic, modal collapse is the condition in which every true statement is necessarily true, and vice versa; that is to say, there are no contingent truths, or to put it another way, that "everything exists necessarily" (and likewise if something does not exist, it cannot exist). In the notation of modal logic, this can be written as $\phi \leftrightarrow \Box \phi$.

In the context of philosophy, the term is commonly used in critiques of ontological arguments for the existence of God and the principle of divine simplicity. For example, Gödel's ontological proof contains $\phi \rightarrow \Box \phi$ as a theorem, which combined with the axioms of system S5 leads to modal collapse. Since some regard divine freedom as essential to the nature of God, and modal collapse as negating the concept of free will, this then leads to the breakdown of Gödel's argument. However, it has been shown that a modified version of Gödel's original argument in modal logics K and T avoids modal collapse while maintaining formal validity. However, the argument fails to justify its central primitive concept of 'positive properties,' making the conclusion dependent on unsupported assumptions about what counts as 'positive'.
