= Theodore Drange =

American philosopher (born 1934)

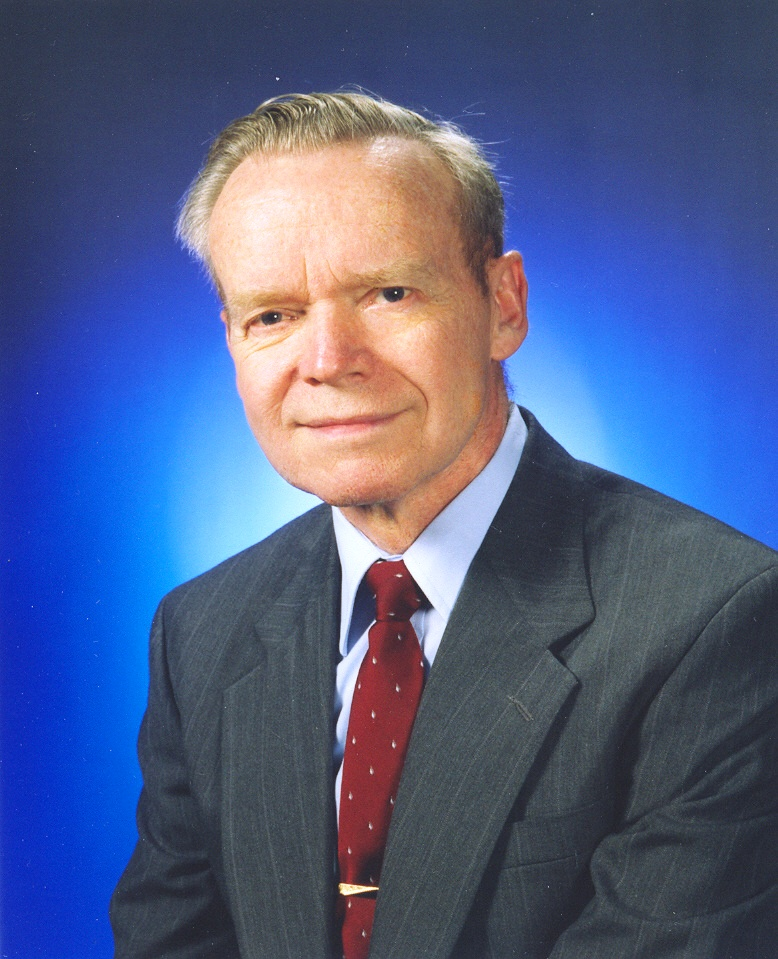
- Born: 1934 (age 90–91); Brooklyn, New York
- Era: 20th-century philosophy
- Region: Western philosophy
- School: Analytic philosophy
- Main interests: Philosophy of religion, philosophy of language, epistemology
- Notable ideas: Argument from nonbelief

Theodore "Ted" Michael Drange (born 1934) is a philosopher of religion and Professor Emeritus at West Virginia University, where he taught philosophy from 1966 to 2001.

== Life ==
After graduating from Fort Hamilton High School, he received a B.A. from Brooklyn College in 1955 and a Ph.D. from Cornell University in 1963, where he moved to after one year of graduate school at Yale.

He taught at Brooklyn College (1960–62), the University of Oregon (1962–65), Idaho State University (1965–66) and West Virginia University, 1966-2001 after becoming a full professor in 1974. Drange retired in 2001 and moved to Ventura, CA.

Drange's primarily interests, until the early 1980s were in philosophy of language and epistemology, later shifting to philosophy of religion.

Drange's first book, Type Crossings (The Hague: Mouton & Co., 1966) was a revision of his Ph.D. dissertation under Max Black on the philosophy of language and was published in 1966. His other book was in the philosophy of religion, Nonbelief and Evil (Amherst, NY: Prometheus Books, 1998), in 1998. Drange has also written several articles on the philosophy of religion and atheism, particularly for the Internet Infidels organization. In 1997, he debated Christian apologist William Lane Craig on the existence of God.

Drange married his wife Annette in 1959 and they have two children, Susan and Michael.

== Bibliography ==
- Drange, Theodore. "Brief Autobiography of Theodore M. Drange". Internet Infidels.
- Drange, Theodore. "Brief Biography of Theodore M. Drange". Archived from the original on 2011-06-04.

== See also ==
- American philosophy
- List of American philosophers
