= Skeptical theism =

View regarding the problem of evil

Skeptical theism is the view that people should remain skeptical of their ability to discern whether their perceptions about evil can be considered good evidence against the existence of the orthodox Christian God. The central thesis of skeptical theism is that it would not be surprising for an infinitely intelligent and knowledgeable being's reasons for permitting evils to be beyond human comprehension. That is, what may seem like pointless evils may be necessary for a greater good or to prevent equal or even greater evils. This central thesis may be argued from a theistic perspective, but is also argued to defend positions of agnosticism.

Skeptical theism can be an informally held belief based on theistic doctrine, but the origin of the term skeptical theist is the 1996 paper "The Skeptical Theist" by philosopher Paul Draper. Following Draper's publication, the term skeptical theism was adopted in academic philosophy and has developed into a family of positions supporting skeptical theism's central skeptical thesis; we should remain skeptical of claims that human beings can discern God's reasons for evils. One argument is based on analogy, likening our understanding of God's motives to those of a child grasping a parent's reasons for seeking painful medical treatment, for example. Other approaches are the limitations on the human ability to understand the moral realm, and appeals to epistemic factors such as sensitivity or contextual requirements.

In the philosophy of religion, skeptical theism is not a broad skepticism toward human knowledge of God, but is instead putatively presented as a response to philosophical propositions, such as those focused on drawing "all things considered" inductive conclusions about God's motives from perceived circumstances. Additionally, skeptical theism is not a position used to defend all forms of theism, though it is most often presented in the defense of orthodox Christian theism. Moreover, skeptical theism is not supported by all theists and some who support its skeptical positions are not theists.

In philosophy, skeptical theism is a defense of theistic or agnostic positions argued to undercut a crucial premise in atheological arguments from evil, a claim that God could have no good reasons for allowing certain types of evil. It is also presented in response to other atheological arguments claiming to know God's purposes based on circumstances, such as the argument from divine hiddenness.

== Draper's skeptical theism ==
In the philosophy of religion, skeptical theism is the position that we should be skeptical of our ability to assess God's motivations or lack of motivation from our perceptions of the circumstances we observe in the world. The view is a response to the atheological argument from evil, which asserts that some evils in the world are gratuitous, pointless, or inscrutable evils, and that they thus represent evidence against the existence of the God of orthodox Christianity. God, by the orthodox view, is thought to be omniscient (all-knowing), omnibenevolent (all-good) and omnipotent (all-powerful). Insofar as it tries to reconcile this conception of God with concerns about gratuitous evils (evils that do occur in the world, but which God is argued to have no morally sufficient reason for permitting), skeptical theism can be considered a form of theodicy. As originally proposed by agnostic philosopher Paul Draper, the view is intended to undercut a key premise in the argument from evil by suggesting that human cognitive faculties could be insufficient to permit drawing inductive inferences concerning God's reasons or lack of reasons for permitting perceived evils.

== The evidential argument from evil ==
The evidential argument from evil asserts that the amount, types, or distribution of evils, provide an evidential basis for concluding that God's existence is improbable. The argument has a number of formulation, but can be stated in the Modus ponens logical form:

1. If an omniscient, omnibenevolent and omnipotent God exists, there should be no gratuitous evil.
2. There exists instances of gratuitous evil.
3. Therefore, an omniscient, omnibenevolent and omnipotent God does not exist.

In this logical form the conclusion (3) is true, if both the major premise (1) and minor premise (2) are true. Philosophers have challenged both premises, but skeptical theism focuses on the minor premise (2).

In 1979, philosopher William Rowe provided a defense of the minor premise (2). He argued that no state of affairs we know of is such that an omnipotent, omniscient being's obtaining it would morally justify that being's permitting some instances of horrific suffering. Therefore, Rowe concludes, it is likely that no state of affairs exists that would morally justify that being in permitting such suffering. In other words, Rowe argues that his inability to think of a good reason why God would allow a particular evil justifies the conclusion that there is no such reason, and the conclusion that God does not exist.

=== The "noseeum" inference ===
The philosophers Michael Bergmann and Michael Rea described William Rowe's justification for the second premise of the argument from evil:

Some evidential arguments from evil ... rely on a "noseeum" inference of the following sort: NI: If, after thinking hard, we can't think of any God-justifying reason for permitting some horrific evil then it is likely that there is no such reason. (The reason NI is called a 'noseeum' inference is that it says, more or less, that because we don't see 'um, they probably ain't there.)

Various analogies are offered to show that the noseeum inference is logically dubious. For example, a novice chess player's inability to discern a chess master's choice of moves cannot be used to infer that there is no good reason for the move.

=== The skeptical theist's response ===
Skeptical theism provides a defense against the evidential argument from evil, but does not take a position on God's actual reason for allowing a particular instance of evil. The defense seeks to show that there are good reasons to believe that God could have justified reasons for allowing a particular evil that we cannot discern. Consequently, we are in no position to endorse the minor premise (2) of the argument from evil because we cannot be more than agnostic about the accuracy of the premise. This conclusion would be an undercutting defeater for the premise because there would be no justification for the conclusion that evils in our world are gratuitous. To justify this conclusion, the skeptical theist argues that the limits of human cognitive faculties are grounds for skepticism about our ability to draw conclusions about God's motives or lack of motives; it is therefore reasonable to doubt the second premise. Bergmann and Rea thus concluded that Rowe's inference is unsound.
