= Omniscience =

Property of possessing maximal knowledge

Omniscience is the property of possessing maximal knowledge. In Hinduism, Buddhism, Sikhism and the Abrahamic religions, it is often attributed to a divine being or an all-knowing spirit, entity or person. In Jainism, omniscience is an attribute that any individual can eventually attain. In Buddhism, there are differing beliefs about omniscience among different schools.

== Etymology ==
The word omniscience derives from the Latin word sciens ("to know" or "conscious") and the prefix omni ("all" or "every"), but also means "all-seeing".

== In religion ==
=== Buddhism ===
The topic of omniscience has been much debated in various Indian traditions, but no more so than by the Buddhists. After Dharmakirti's excursions into the subject of what constitutes a valid cognition, Śāntarakṣita and his student Kamalaśīla thoroughly investigated the subject in the Tattvasamgraha and its commentary the Panjika. The arguments in the text can be broadly grouped into four sections:

- The refutation that cognitions, either perceived, inferred, or otherwise, can be used to refute omniscience.
- A demonstration of the possibility of omniscience through apprehending the selfless universal nature of all knowables, by examining what it means to be ignorant and the nature of mind and awareness.
- A demonstration of the total omniscience where all individual characteristics (svalaksana) are available to the omniscient being.
- The specific demonstration of Shakyamuni Buddha's non-exclusive omniscience, but the knowledge of Shakyamuni Buddha's is really infinite and no other gods or being can match his true omniscience.

Omniscience is not considered in the same way throughout Buddhism. For example, Buddhaghosa, who flourished in the fifth century, understands Buddha's omniscience to be his capacity of knowing everything that he directs his mind toward, not his knowing everything all at once. This was used by Buddhaghosa to circumvent paradoxes he saw in the some of the suttas, which have episodes such as Buddha begging for food in an uninhabited place. Dharmakirti argues that the Buddha only knows things relevant for liberation, which includes the four noble truths. This allows him to ensure that Buddha does not know things which are considered to be ultimately unreal.

=== Christianity ===
Some modern Christian theologians argue that God's omniscience is inherent rather than total, and that God chooses to limit his omniscience in order to preserve the free will and dignity of his creatures. John Calvin, among other theologians of the 16th century, comfortable with the definition of God as being omniscient in the total sense, in order for worthy beings' abilities to choose freely, embraced the doctrine of predestination.

=== Hinduism ===
In traditions like the Śaiva Pratyabhijñā school, omniscience is a quality of God as well as attainable by selves, who are called yogins. The Nyāya tradition also accepts the omniscience of God and yogins. God's omniscience is accepted because of his being the creator, which requires that God knows about all the components of creation.

In the Bhakti tradition of Vaishnavism, where Vishnu is worshipped as the supreme God, Vishnu is attributed with numerous qualities such as omniscience, energy, strength, lordship, vigour, and splendour.

Not all Hindu traditions accept the existence of an omniscient being. For example, the Mīmāṃsā school denies that an omniscient being can exist.

=== Islam ===
God in Islam is attributed with absolute omniscience. God knows the past, the present, and the future. It is compulsory for a Muslim to believe that God is indeed omniscient as stated in one of the six articles of faith which is:

- To believe that God's divine decree and predestination

Say: Do you instruct God about your religion? But God knows all that is in the heavens and on the earth; God is Knowing of all things

— Quran 49:16

It is believed that humans can only change their predestination (wealth, health, deed etc.) and not divine decree (date of birth, date of death, family etc.), thus allowing free will.

=== Baha'i Faith ===
Omniscience is an attribute of God, yet it is also an attribute that reveals sciences to humanity:

In like manner, the moment the word expressing My attribute "The Omniscient" issueth forth from My mouth, every created thing will, according to its capacity and limitations, be invested with the power to unfold the knowledge of the most marvelous sciences, and will be empowered to manifest them in the course of time at the bidding of Him Who is the Almighty, the All-Knowing.

— Baha'i Reference Library

=== Jainism ===
In Jainism, omniscience is considered the highest type of perception. In the words of a Jain scholar, "The perfect manifestation of the innate nature of the self, arising on the complete annihilation of the obstructive veils, is called omniscience."

Jainism views infinite knowledge as an inherent capability of every soul. Arihanta is the word used by Jains to refer to those human beings who have conquered all inner passions (like attachment, greed, pride, anger) and possess Kevala Jnana (infinite knowledge). They are said to be of two kinds:

1. Sāmānya kevali – omniscient beings (Kevalins) who are concerned with their own liberation.
2. Tirthankara kevali – human beings who attain omniscience and then help others to achieve the same.

== Omniscience and free will ==
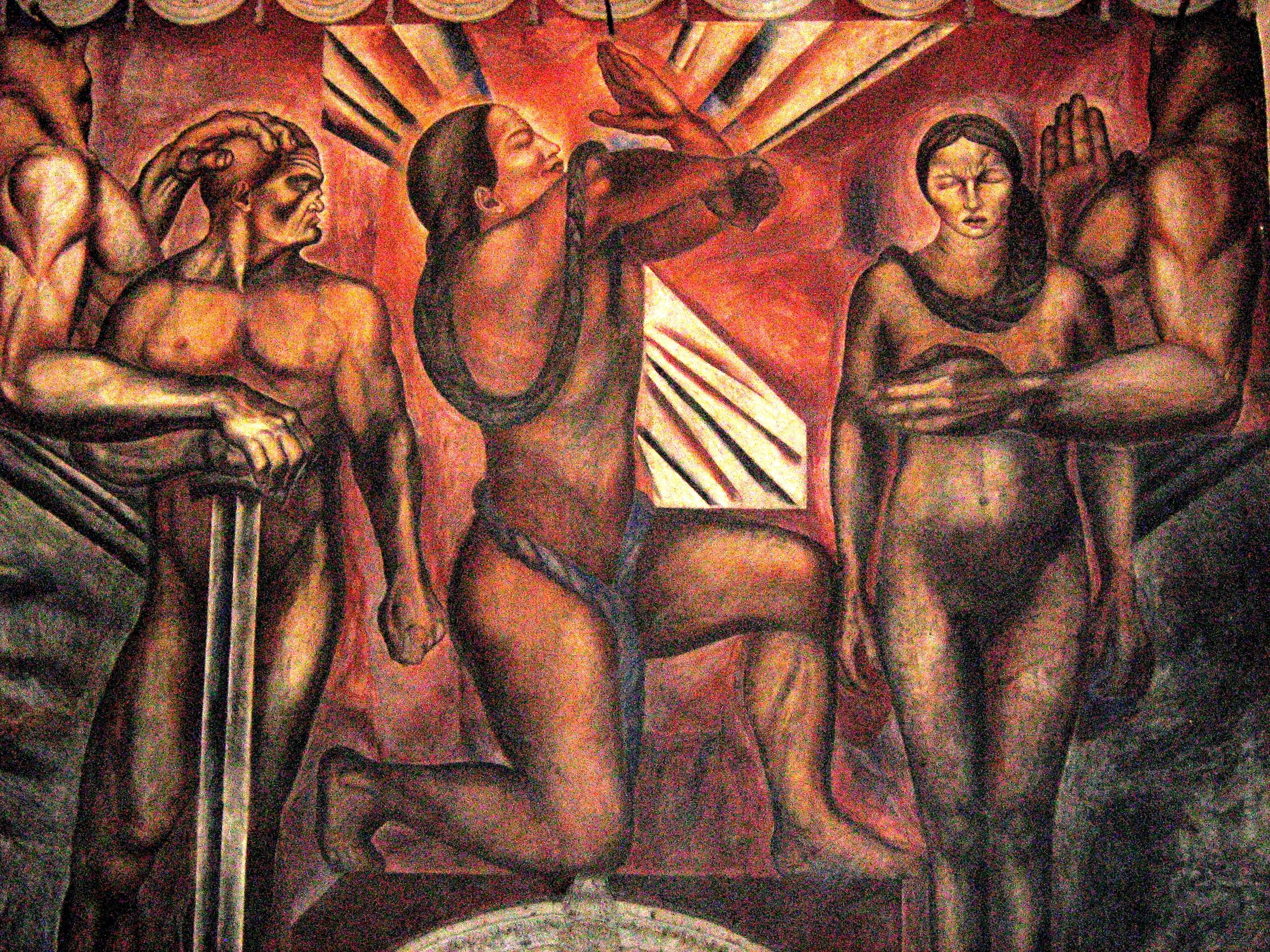
Omniciencia, mural by José Clemente Orozco

Whether omniscience, particularly regarding the choices that a human will make, is compatible with free will has been debated by theologians and philosophers. The argument that divine foreknowledge is not compatible with free will is known as theological fatalism. It is argued that if humans are free to choose between alternatives, God could not know what this choice will be.

A question arises: if an omniscient entity knows everything, even about its own decisions in the future, does it therefore forbid any free will to that entity? William Lane Craig states that the question subdivides into two:

1. If God foreknows the occurrence of some event E, does E happen necessarily?
2. If some event E is contingent, how can God foreknow E's occurrence?

However, this kind of argument fails to recognize its use of the modal fallacy. It is possible to show that the first premise of arguments like these is fallacious.

== Omniscience and the privacy of conscious experience ==
Some philosophers, such as Patrick Grim, Linda Zagzebski, Stephan Torre, and William Mander have discussed the issue of whether the apparent exclusively first-person nature of conscious experience is compatible with God's omniscience. There is a strong sense in which conscious experience is private, meaning that no outside observer can gain knowledge of what it is like to be me as me. If a subject cannot know what it is like to be another subject in an objective manner, the question is whether that limitation applies to God as well. If it does, then God cannot be said to be omniscient since there is then a form of knowledge that God lacks access to.

The philosopher Patrick Grim most notably raised this issue. Linda Zagzebski argued against this by introducing the notion of perfect empathy, a proposed relation that God can have to subjects that would allow God to have perfect knowledge of their conscious experience. William Mander argued that God can only have such knowledge if our experiences are part of God's broader experience. Stephan Torre claimed that God can have such knowledge if self-knowledge involves the ascription of properties, either to oneself or to others.

== See also ==
- Epistemology
- Omnibenevolence
- Omniscient point-of-view, in writing, is to know everything that can be known about a character.
- Omnipotence
- Omnipresence
- Pantomath
- Self-awareness

== Sources ==
- Sangave, Vilas Adinath (2001), Aspects of Jaina religion (3 ed.), Bharatiya Jnanpith, ISBN 978-81-263-0626-8
- Mehta, Mohan Lal (1954), Outlines of Jaina Philosophy, Jain Mission Society (Original – the University of Michigan)
