= Argument from free will =

Contention that omniscience is incompatible with free will

The argument from free will, also called the paradox of free will or theological fatalism, contends that omniscience and free will are incompatible and that any conception of God that incorporates both properties is therefore inconceivable.

See the various controversies over claims of God's omniscience, in particular the critical notion of foreknowledge. These arguments are deeply concerned with the implications of predestination.

== Omniscience and free will ==
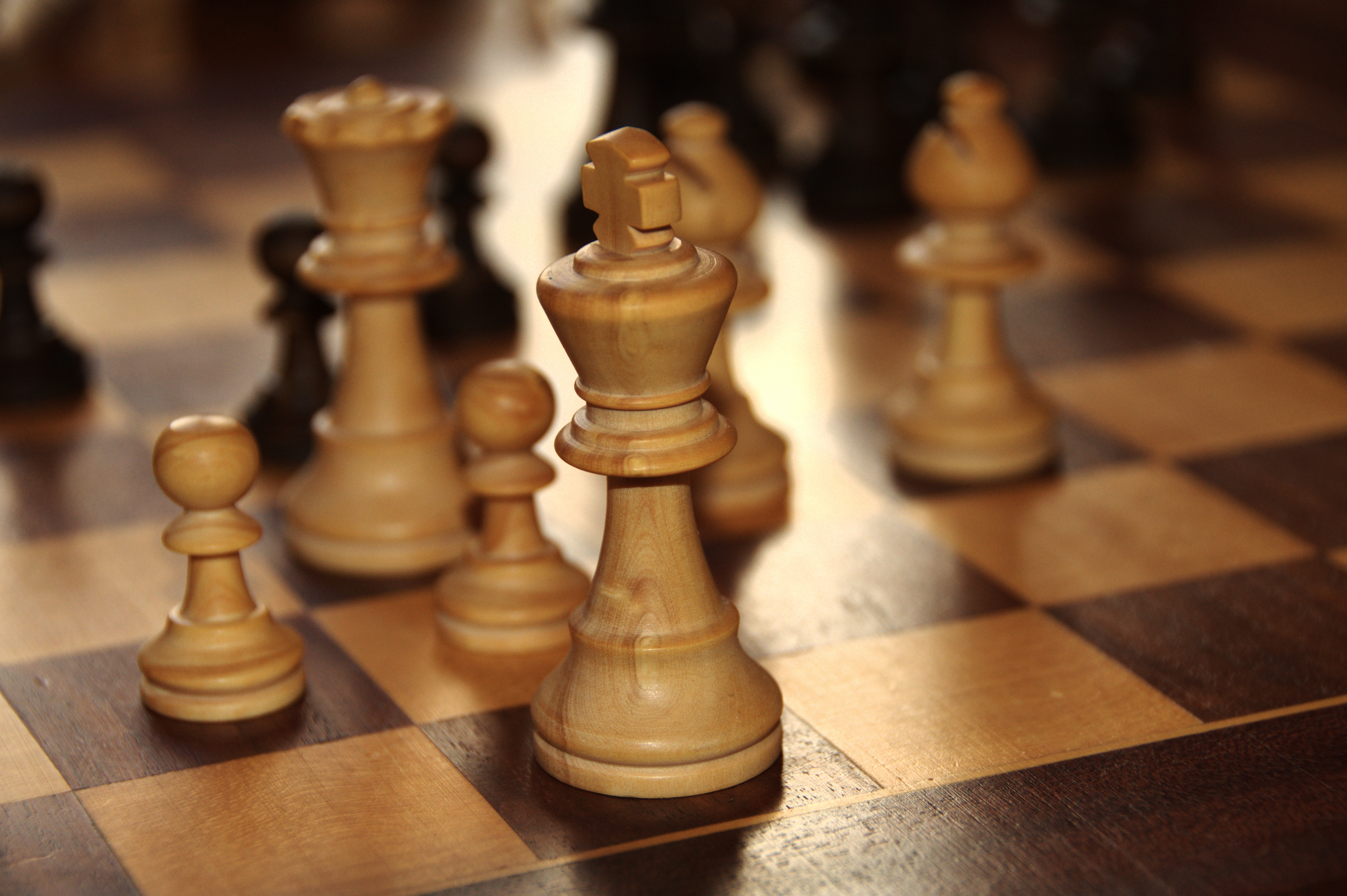
If God made the game, its rules, and the players, then how can any player be free?

Some arguments against the existence of God focus on the supposed incoherence of humankind possessing free will and God's omniscience. These arguments are deeply concerned with the implications of predestination.

Noted Jewish philosopher Moses Maimonides described the conflict between divine omnipotence and his creation's person's free will, in traditional terms of good and evil actions, as follows:

… "Does God know or does He not know that a certain individual will be good or bad? If thou sayest 'He knows', then it necessarily follows that the man is compelled to act as God knew beforehand how he would act, otherwise, God's knowledge would be imperfect.…"

A "standard Anglican" theologian gave a similar description of Christian revelation:

… Scripture hold before us two great counter-truths – first, God's absolute sovereignty (cp Rome. 9, 20ff.), and secondly, man's responsibility. Our intellects cannot reconcile them.

A logical formulation of this argument might go as follows:

1. God knows choice "C" that a human would claim to "make freely".
2. It is now necessary that C.
3. If it is now necessary that C, then C cannot be otherwise (this is the definition of “necessary”). That is, there are no actual "possibilities" due to predestination.
4. If you cannot do otherwise when you act, you do not act freely (Principle of Alternate Possibilities)
5. Therefore, when you do an act, you will not do it freely.

Norman Swartz, however, contends that the above arguments commit what is known as modal fallacy. In particular, he asserts that these arguments assume that if C is true, it becomes necessary for C to be true, which is incorrect as C is contingent (see modal logic). Otherwise, one can argue that the future is set already regardless of his actions.

Other means of reconciling God's omniscience with human free will have been proposed. Some have attempted to redefine or reconceptualize free will:

- God can know in advance what I will do, because free will is to be understood only as freedom from coercion, and anything further is an illusion. This is the move made by compatibilistic philosophies.
- The sovereignty (autonomy) of God, existing within a free agent, provides strong inner compulsions toward a course of action (calling), and the power of choice (election). The actions of a human are thus determined by a human acting on relatively strong or weak urges (both from God and the environment around them) and their own relative power to choose.

A proposition first offered by Boethius and later by Thomas Aquinas (Note: See also Divine Providence versus the concept of Fate) and C. S. Lewis, suggests that God's perception of time is different, and that this is relevant to our understanding of our own free will. In his book Mere Christianity, Lewis argues that God is actually outside time and therefore does not "foresee" events, but rather simply observes them all at once. He explains:

But suppose God is outside and above the Time-line. In that case, what we call "tomorrow" is visible to Him in just the same way as what we call "today". All the days are "Now" for Him. He does not remember you doing things yesterday, He simply sees you doing them: because, though you have lost yesterday, He has not. He does not "foresee" you doing things tomorrow, He simply sees you doing them: because, though tomorrow is not yet there for you, it is for Him. You never supposed that your actions at this moment were any less free because God knows what you are doing. Well, He knows your tomorrow's actions in just the same way – because He is already in tomorrow and can simply watch you. In a sense, He does not know your action till you have done it: but then the moment at which you have done it is already "Now" for Him.

A common objection is to argue that Molinism, or the belief that God can know counterfactually the actions of his creations, is true. This has been used as an argument by Alvin Plantinga and William Lane Craig, amongst others.

== Free will argument for the nonexistence of God ==
Dan Barker suggests that this can lead to a "Free will Argument for the Nonexistence of God" on the grounds that God's omniscience is incompatible with God having free will and that if God does not have free will, God is not a personal being.

Theists generally agree that God is a personal being and that God is omniscient, (Note: see e.g. Richard Swinburne Does God Exist? of The Catechism of the Catholic Church) but there is some disagreement about whether "omniscient" means:

1. "knows everything that God chooses to know and that is logically possible to know"; or instead the slightly stronger:
2. "knows everything that is logically possible to know" (Note: see e.g. John Polkinghorne)

These two terms are known as inherent and total omniscience, respectively.

== See also ==
- Book of Life – Book used by God in Abrahamic religions
- Determinism
- List of paradoxes
- Molinism
