= J. L. Schellenberg =

Canadian philosopher of religion (born 1959)

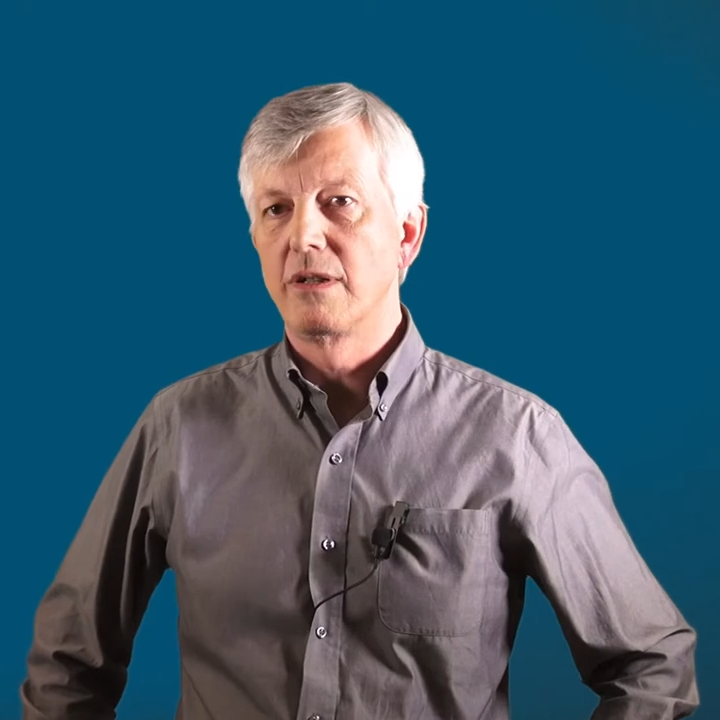
- Schellenberg in 2017
- Born: 1959 (age 66–67)

Education
- Education: University of Oxford (DPhil); University of Calgary (BA, MA)

Philosophical work
- School: Analytic philosophy
- Institutions: Mount Saint Vincent University
- Notable ideas: Argument from divine hiddenness; Skeptical religion; Ultimism

John L. Schellenberg (born 1959) is a Canadian philosopher who is best known for his work in philosophy of religion. He has earned a Doctor of Philosophy in Philosophy from the University of Oxford, and is Professor of Philosophy at Mount Saint Vincent University and adjunct professor in the Faculty of Graduate Studies at Dalhousie University, both in Halifax, Nova Scotia.

Schellenberg's early development of an argument from divine hiddenness for atheism has been influential. In a subsequent series of books he has formulated a hypothetical form of religious belief which he has called "skeptical religion", which he regards as being compatible with atheism. In 2013, the Cambridge University Press journal Religious Studies published a special issue devoted to critical discussion of Schellenberg's philosophy of religion.

== Early life and education ==
Schellenberg was born in 1959. He graduated from the University of Calgary in 1985 with a BA in religious studies, and received an MA in philosophy from the same institution in 1987.

== Philosophical work ==
=== Divine hiddenness ===
Schellenberg's first book, Divine Hiddenness and Human Reason (Cornell University Press, 1993), developed the argument from divine hiddenness (or hiddenness argument) against the existence of a God. Discussion of Schellenberg's argument continues today, in academic journals, anthologies, and other books, as well as online.

Schellenberg's most recent statement of the hiddenness argument may be summarized as follows. A God (construed as a perfect personal being) could not be less than perfectly loving, and a perfectly loving God would always be open to a meaningful conscious relationship with finite persons who are capable of participating in such a relationship and do not resist it. This implies that if there is a God, every finite person who fits that description is able to exercise his or her capacity and be part of such a relationship. But this cannot be the case unless everyone who fits that description believes that God exists (for to have a conscious relationship with someone you have to believe they exist). It follows that if there is a God, there is no one who fits that description and fails to believe that God exists, i.e., there are no "nonresistant nonbelievers". But there are. Therefore, there is no God.

Critics have argued that even a loving God might have reasons to be hidden generated by such things as the requirements of human freedom, human unreadiness for relationship with God, or the religious value of doubt. Schellenberg has replied that philosophers have no reason to assume that the persons God would create would be human persons existing in a world like ours, and that there are various ways in which the same good states of affairs to which critics appeal would be capable of being experienced in the context of a relationship with God.

=== Skeptical religion ===
Schellenberg's work after 1993 includes a trilogy on philosophy of religion (also published by Cornell: 2005, 2007, 2009). This project aims to address the most fundamental issues in that field and to set an agenda for future inquiry. The first volume, Prolegomena to a Philosophy of Religion, examines basic concepts in philosophy of religion such as ‘religion’, ‘belief’, ‘faith’ and ‘skepticism’ (or ‘doubt’) and proposes what Schellenberg regards as ways of revamping the discipline, including a new understanding of faith without belief. The second volume, The Wisdom to Doubt: A Justification of Religious Skepticism, offers various different arguments for religious skepticism that are intended to prepare the reader for the third book – The Will to Imagine: A Justification of Skeptical Religion.

In the third book, Schellenberg argues for a religious orientation grounded not in belief, but in the sort of imaginative faith detailed in the first volume. Instead of focusing on theism, or any other specific idea from today's religions, this sort of religion, which Schellenberg calls ‘skeptical religion’, is focused on a proposition to which he gives the name ‘ultimism’. Ultimism, as he defines it, is more general than other religious ‘isms’ – it is the proposition that something is ultimate in the nature of things, ultimately valuable, and the source of our ultimate good, but the details of that something it leaves open.

Schellenberg suggests that arguments criticized as unable to support traditional belief in God can be adapted to support skeptical religion. In his view, skeptical religion therefore offers a solution to the problem of faith and reason. A central feature of Schellenberg's trilogy is his suggestion that if we alter our perspective on time – looking into the deep future as well as the deep past – we will see that we may be at a very early stage in our development as a species (given that it is possible that the Earth will remain habitable for another billion years). With this vast stretch of time before us, he asks, why would we think that our best ideas – even ideas about religion – are behind us? At this stage in our development, Schellenberg argues, religion of a different sort from what we have seen before is called for.

Critics have argued that if Schellenberg is skeptical or doubting about ultimism on the basis of future possibilities, then he should also be skeptical about theism instead of being an atheist, and that the idea of skeptical religion might be hard to put into practice. Schellenberg has said that there is a danger here of "crying over unspilt milk" since we have hardly begun to think about skeptical religion. He has also suggested reasons for distinguishing between theism (which he says may be disbelieved) and ultimism (which he says should only be doubted) on the basis of the former's detailed content.

=== Science and religion debate ===
Schellenberg's Evolutionary Religion (Oxford University Press, 2013) aims to be a more widely accessible account of his arguments in the trilogy. It seeks to place these arguments into an evolutionary framework and maintains that skeptical religion provides a new way of responding to the science and religion debate.

== Books ==
- Divine Hiddenness and Human Reason. Cornell University Press. 2006 [1993]. ISBN 978-0-8014-7346-3.
- Prolegomena to a Philosophy of Religion. Cornell University Press. 2005. ISBN 9780801443589.
- The Wisdom to Doubt: A Justification of Religious Skepticism. Cornell University Press. 2007. ISBN 9780801445545.
- The Will to Imagine: A Justification of Skeptical Religion. Cornell University Press. 2009. ISBN 978-0-8014-4780-8.
- Evolutionary Religion. Oxford University Press. 2013. ISBN 978-0-19-967376-6.
- The Hiddenness Argument: Philosophy's New Challenge to Belief in God. Oxford University Press. 2015. ISBN 978-0-19-873308-9.
- Progressive Atheism: How Moral Evolution Changes the God Debate. Bloomsbury Publishing. 2019. ISBN 978-1-350-09720-9.
- Religion After Science. Cambridge University Press. 2019. ISBN 978-1-108-49903-3.
- What God Would Have Known: How Human Intellectual and Moral Development Undermines Christian Doctrine. Oxford University Press. 2024. ISBN 978-0-198-91232-3.
