= Norman Swartz =

Norman Swartz (born 1939) is an American philosopher and professor emeritus (retired 1998) of philosophy, Simon Fraser University. He is the author or co-author of multiple books and multiple articles on the Internet Encyclopedia of Philosophy.

He earned a Bachelor of Arts in physics from Harvard College in 1961, an Master of Arts in history and philosophy of science from Indiana University Bloomington in 1965 and a Ph.D. in history of philosophy of science in 1971 also from Indiana University. He uses the term physical law to mean the laws of nature as they truly are and not as they are inferred and described in the practice of science.

== Publications ==
Following is an incomplete list of publications.

- Definitions, Dictionaries, and Meanings (1997, revised 2010)

=== Books ===
- Possible Worlds: An Introduction to Logic and Its Philosophy. Co-authored with Raymond Bradley. (Indianapolis: Hackett), 1979.
- The Concept of Physical Law. (New York: Cambridge University Press), 1985.
- Beyond Experience: Metaphysical Theories and Philosophical Constraints. (Toronto: University of Toronto Press), 1991.

=== Articles on the Internet Encyclopedia of Philosophy ===
- Laws of Nature
- Truth
- Foreknowledge and Free Will
