= Three bodies doctrine =

Doctrine in Vedanta: the gross body, the subtle body, and the causal body

According to three bodies doctrine in Hinduism, the human being is composed of three shariras or "bodies" emanating from Brahman by avidya, "ignorance" or "nescience". They are often equated with the five koshas (sheaths), which cover the atman. It is an essential doctrine in Indian philosophy and religion, especially Yoga, Advaita Vedanta, Tantra, and Shaivism.

== The three bodies ==
=== Sthula sharira — gross body ===
The sthula sharira (sthūla śarīra) or the gross body is the material physical mortal body that eats, breathes and moves (acts). It is composed of many diverse components, produced by one's karmas (actions) in past lives out of the elements which have undergone panchikarana i.e. combining of the five primordial subtle elements.

It is the instrument of the jiva's experience, which, attached to the body and dominated by ahamkara, uses the body's external and internal organs of sense and action. In its waking state, the jiva identifies itself with the body and enjoys gross objects. On its body rests man's contact with the external world.

The sthula sharira's main features are sambhava (birth), jara (old age or ageing) and maranam (death), and the "waking state". The sthula sharira is the anatman.

=== Sukshma sharira — subtle body ===
Sukshma sharira (sūkṣma śarīra) or the subtle body is the body of the mind and the vital energies, which keep the physical body alive. Together with the causal body it is the transmigrating soul or jiva, separating from the gross body upon death.

The subtle body is composed of the five subtle elements, the elements before they have undergone panchikarana, and contains:

- sravanadipanchakam – the five organs of perception: eyes, ears, skin, tongue and nose
- vagadipanchakam – the five organs of action: speech, hands, legs, anus and genitals
- pranapanchakam – the five-fold vital breath: Prana (respiration), Apana (evacuation of waste from the body), Vyana (blood circulation), Udana (actions like sneezing, crying, vomiting etc.), Samana (digestion)
- Manas
- Buddhi, the Intellect, discriminating wisdom

Other Indian traditions see the subtle body as an eighth-fold aggregate, placing together the mind-aspects and adding avidyā, kāma, and karma:

- buddhyadicatustayam (buddhi, manas, citta, ahamkara),
- avidya (adhyasa, super-imposition),
- kama (desire),
- karma (action of the nature of dharma and adharma).

In Samkhya, which does not acknowledge a causal body, it is also known as the linga-sarira. It puts one in the mind of the atman; it reminds one of the atman, the controller. It is the beginningless limitation of the atman, and has no beginning like the sthula sharira.

The "dream state" is a distinct state of the subtle body, where the buddhi shines itself owing to memory of deeds done in the waking state. It is the indispensable operative cause of all the activities of the individual self.

=== Karana sharira — causal body ===
Karana sharira (kāraṇa śarīra) or the causal body is merely the cause or seed of the subtle body and the gross body. It has no other function than being the seed of the subtle and the gross body. It is nirvikalpa rupam, "undifferentiated form". It originates with avidya, "ignorance" or "nescience" of the real identity of the atman, instead giving birth to the notion of jiva.

Swami Sivananda characterizes the causal body as "The beginningless ignorance that is indescribable". Siddharameshwar Maharaj, the guru of Nisargadatta Maharaj, also describes the causal body as characterized by "emptiness", "ignorance", and "darkness". In the search for the "I am", this is a state where there is nothing to hold on to anymore.

Ramanuja concludes that it is at this stage that consummation of the atman with the Paramatman is reached and the search for the highest Purusa, i.e., of Ishvara, ends.

According to other philosophical schools, the causal body is not the atman, because it also has a beginning and an end and is subject to modification. Shankara, not seeking a personal god, goes beyond Anandamaya Kosha in search of the transcendent Brahman.

The Indian tradition identifies it with the Anandamaya kosha, and the deep sleep state, where buddhi becomes dormant and all concepts of time fail, although there are differences between these three descriptions.

The causal body is considered the most complex of the three bodies. It contains the impressions of experience, which results from past experience.

== Correlations with other models ==
=== Three bodies and five sheaths ===
The Taittiriya Upanishad describes five koshas, which are also often equated with the three bodies. The three bodies are often equated with the five koshas (sheaths), which cover the Atman:

1. Sthula sharira, the Gross body, also called the Annamaya Kosha
2. Sukshma sharira, the Subtle body, composed of:
  1. Pranamaya Kosha (Vital breath or Energy),
  2. Manomaya Kosha (Mind),
  3. Vijnanamaya Kosha (Intellect)
3. Karana sharira, the Causal body, the Anandamaya Kosha (Bliss)

== In Indian philosophy ==
=== Yoga physiology ===
The three bodies are an essential part of the Yoga physiology. Yoga aims at controlling the vital energies of the bodies, thereby attaining siddhis (supernatural or spiritual powers) and moksha.

=== Atman vijnana ===
According to the Advaita Vedanta tradition, knowledge of the "self" or atman can be gained by self-inquiry, investigating the three bodies, and dis-identifying from them. It is a method which is known to have been taught by Ramana Maharshi, Nisargadatta Maharaj, and his teacher Siddharameshwar Maharaj.

By subsequently identifying with the three lower bodies, investigating them, and discarding identification with them when it has become clear that they are not the "I", the sense of "I am" beyond knowledge and Ignorance becomes clearly established.

In this investigation the three bodies are recognized as not being anatman.

== In modern culture ==
=== Theosophy ===
The later Theosophists speak of seven bodies or levels of existence that include Sthula sarira and Linga sharira (Liṅga śarīra) also known as Sukshma sharira.

=== Yogananda ===
The guru Paramahansa Yogananda spoke of three bodies in his 1946 Autobiography of a Yogi.

== See also ==
Hinduism

- Chakra
- Kundalini
- Mandukya Upanishad

Buddhism

- Namarupa
- Skandha
- Trikaya

== Sources ==
=== Published sources ===
- Feuerstein, Georg (1978), Handboek voor Yoga [Textbook of Yoga], Ankh-Hermes
- Ranade, Ramachandra Dattatrya (1926), A constructive survey of Upanishadic philosophy, Mumbai: Bharatiya Vidya Bhavan
- Sharma, Arvind (2006), A Primal Perspective on the philosophy of Religion, Springer, ISBN 978-1-4020-5014-5
- Siddharameshwar Maharaj (2009), Master Key to Self-Realization. In: Master of Self-Realization. An Ultimate Understanding, Sadguru Publishing
- Yogananda, Paramahansa (1946), "Chapter 43", Autobiography of a Yogi, Self-Realization Fellowship
