= Chidabhasa =

Sanskrit term for the reflected Universal Self

- Samkhya: Kapila
- Yoga: Patanjali
- Vaisheshika: Kaṇāda, Prashastapada
- Secular: Valluvar

Chidabhasa is the Sanskrit term which means the abhasa or reflection of Brahman, the Universal Self, on or through the mind; ordinarily this term is used to denote the reflected Universal Self in the Jiva, the Individual Self. The philosophical conditionedness belongs to chidabhasa. The causal body or the Karana Sarira which is the cause of man’s enjoyment or suffering is composed of the Anandamaya Kosha and adheres to the soul so long as the soul resides in the Sthula Sarira ('gross body') or the Sukshama Sarira ('subtle body'), both vehicles of Avidya ('ignorance'); afflicted by vasanas ('desires/longings') the ordinary being does not become Chidabhasa, the reflection of the Atman in the Karana Sarira (Kaivalyanavanita II.31).

Avidya ('ignorance') is beginningless, it is an Upadhi ('the limiting adjunct'). 'Chidabhasa' is the reflection of Consciousness in buddhi ('the intellectual faculty'), the effect of avidya, which is inseparably united with buddhi. Jiva is the imperfect form of Consciousness and is an unreality. The Nirguna Brahman causes Chidabhasa to appear as real consciousness and operate in the Vyavaharika world as the doer, the enjoyer, sufferer and so forth. Chidabhasa constitutes Ishvaratva and is almost an exact likeness of true consciousness on account of its being associated with Prakrti in equilibrium and consequently unperturbed by the gunas in action. Jiva, the enjoyer and the sufferer, is neither the immutable Kutastha nor Chidabhasa (on account of which the intellect grasps the things that come within its range) but a combination of the two. The Jiva not realizing the reality of Kutastha considers all individual and collective enjoyments and sufferings to be real; the Jiva projects and superimposes on the Self the qualities of doership etc.; and assumes many forms in the waking and the dream states.

Vedanta holds that there is one Atman for all Jivas and what distinguishes one Jiva from another is its separate antahkarana and chidabhasa (which two are subtle parts of the body). An object is known by the mind with the assistance of chidabhasa-chaitaniya, there is object-consciousness when chidabhasa begins to act. The intellect which is a modification of Prakrti cannot know an object because an object cannot know itself. Suresvaracharya states that Consciousness which manifests itself as an illuminating factor in all external perceptions is really the object to be known otherwise Consciousness itself is not aware of anything.
