= Panchendriyas =

Human sense organs according to Hinduism

Panchendriyas (Sanskrit: पञ्चइन्द्रिय, IAST: Pañchendriya) are the sense organs of the human body in Hinduism, consisting of mind and action, each consisting of five subtypes. Five buddhi-indriyas or Jnanendriyas ("mental or senses") and five Karmendriyas ("sense organs that deal with bodily functions").

== Five gyanendriyas ==
Gyanendriya is the organ of perception, the faculty of perceiving through the senses. The first five of the seventeen elements of the subtle body are the "organs of perception" or "sense organs". According to Hinduism and Vaishnavism there are five gyanendriya or "sense organs" – ears, skin, eyes, tongue and nose.

== Five Karmendriyas ==
Karmendriya is an Indian philosophical concept. Karmendriya is the "organ of action" according to Hinduism and Jainism. Karmendriyas are five, and they are: hasta, pada, bak, anus, upastha. In Jainism these are the senses used by the experiencing soul to perform actions.

== See also ==
- Panchakosha
- Kosha
