= Tattva (Ayyavazhi) =

Tatvas are the 96 qualities or properties of human body according to Akilattirattu Ammanai, the religious book of Ayyavazhi. They are as follows:

== Jñānendriya - 5 ==
The organs of sense

1. The eye (chakshu-tattva) - the organ of sight having visible formes as its object.
2. The ear (srotra-tattva) - the organ of hearing, having sound as its object.
3. The nose (ghrana-tattva) - the organ of smelling, having smell (odors) as its object.
4. The tongue (rasana-tattva) - the organ of tasting, having flavors as its object.
5. The skin (tvak-tattva) – the organ of feeling, having touch (contact) as its object.

Hearing, Feeling by Touch, Seeing, Tasting and Smelling are the Soul's Powers of Perceptual Knowledge and extensions of the Lower Mind, whereby the Soul experiences the multitude of sense perceptions that constitute the external World.

== Karmendriya - 5 ==
The organs of actions

1. The mouth (vak-tattva) - organ for speech (voice)
2. The feet (pada-tattva) - organ for walking (feet)
3. The hands (pani-tattva) - organ for grasping (hands)
4. The anus (payu-tattva) - organ for excretion (anus)
5. The genitals (upastha-tattva) - organ for procreation (genitals)

Speaking, Grasping, Moving About, Excreting and Sexual Activities are the Soul's Powers of responding to and interacting with, the external World.

== Tanmatras - 5 ==
The archetypes or subtle rudiments of elementary matter, the five elements being resolved into the rudimentary elements of the five senses.

1. The light/form (rupa-tattva)
2. The sound (sabdha-tattva)
3. The taste (rasa-tattva)
4. The smell (gandha-tattva)
5. The consciousness/feel/palpation (sparsha-tattva)

Sound, Touch, Colour, Flavour and Odour constitute the Soul's sense data that together form his external experiences.

== Antahkarana - 4 ==
The intellectual powers

1. Mana – the organ of thought
2. Buddhi – the organ of understanding.
3. Aham – the power of mind which leads to the accomplishment of objectives, and eventually toward identifications and attachments.
4. Chitta – the organ where Sanskaras are stored, and from where all the vikaras of mind originate.

== Naadi - 10 ==
The ten nerves:

1. Suzhi munai – the nerve passing through six ataras
2. Idakalai – the nerve beginning from the great toe of the right foot and passing up to the left nostril.
3. Pinkalai - the nerve beginning from the great toe of the left foot and passing up to the right nostril.
4. Kanthari – the nerve beginning at the navel and passing to the neck, where it assumes a sevenfold form, being the source of the seven musical tones of the human voice.
5. Atthi
6. Siguvai – situated in the region of the eyes forming ten branches, as optical nerves.
7. Alambudai
8. Purudan – in the region of the ears forming 120 branches or auditory nerves
9. Guru – beginning at the naval and reaching to the verenda.
10. Sangini – situated in the verenda.

== Chakras - 7 ==
There are seven Chakras

1. Moolaadhaara
2. Swaadhisthaana
3. Manippoora
4. Anaahata
5. Vishuddhi
6. Aajnaa
7. Sahasraara

== Dhatus - 7 ==
The seven constituents of the body:

1. The Serum
2. The Blood
3. The Semen
4. The bone marrow
5. The Flesh
6. The Bone
7. The Skin

== Vayu - 10 ==
The ten vital airs of the body

1. Praana – situated in the heart
2. Apaana - situated in the top of the head and passing downwards
3. Samaana - situated in the pit of the throat
4. Vyaana – pervading the whole body
5. Udaana - situated in the navel
6. Naaga – which effects the motions and speech
7. Koorma – causing horripilation
8. Krikara - seated in the face
9. Devadatta – that which is exhaled in yawning
10. Dhananjaya – that which remains in the body after the death and escapes by splitting the head.

== Kosa - 5 ==
There are five Kosa

1. Annamaya - The food body
2. Pranamaya - The force vitalizes and holds together the body and the mind
3. Manomaya - The body composed of mind
4. Vijnanamaya - The body composed of intellect
5. Anandamaya - The body composed of bliss

== Navadwaram - 9 ==
The apertures to the body

1. Two eyes
2. Two ears
3. Two nostrils
4. The mouth
5. The anus
6. Urinary orifice

== Vikaara - 8 ==
(Kaama[desire], Krodha[anger], Lobha[greed], Moha[attachment], Mada[arrogance] and Maatsarya[hatred](Jealousy is also a kind of hatred) are the original Vikaaras mentioned in Gita)

The eight vices

1. Lust
2. Penuriousness
3. Wrath
4. Fierce, ungovernable lust
5. Recklessness
6. Ostentation
7. Arrogance
8. Envy

== Mandala - 3 ==
The three regions of the human body

1. Agni mandala – that of fire in lower abdomen
2. Aaditya mandala – of the sun in the stomach
3. Chandra mandala – of the moon in the head and shoulders

== Pini - 3 ==
The three kinds of temperaments - tri doshas

1. Vaata - Flatulency – inducing melancholy.
2. Pitta - Bile – bilious distempers.
3. Kapha - Phlegm – a phlegmatic temper.

== Gunas - 3 ==
The three attributes. (The 3 original Powers causing the creation)

1. Sattva guna(Jnaana Shakti)
2. Rajas guna (Kriyaa Shakti)
3. Tamo guna (power of ignorance and obstruction causing darkness)

== Mala - 3 ==
The three evil passions inherent in the soul

1. Pride
2. Moral actions
3. Maya

== Avasthaa - 5 ==
These are 5 states of consciousness in human forms.

1. Jaagarita - Waking
2. Swapna - copping
3. Sushupti - Deep Sleep (slumber)
4. Tureeya - Underlying state in all the above states
5. Unmani or Tureeyateeta - State of enlightened beings where the cosmos is experienced as oneness.

== See also ==
- Kaliyan
- Ayyavazhi
