= Antahkarana =

Concept in Hindu philosophy

Antaḥkaraṇa (Sanskrit: अन्तःकरण) is a concept in Hindu philosophy, referring to the totality of the mind, including the thinking faculty, the sense of I-ness, and the discriminating faculty. Antaḥ means 'inner' and karaṇa means 'instrument', or, 'function'. Therefore, the word Antaḥkaraṇa can be understood as 'inner organ', 'inner functions', or, 'inner instrument'.

== Four Functions ==
The antahkarana is composed of the four functions of the mind, namely the manas (the mind or lower mind), buddhi (the intellect or higher mind), chitta (memory, or, consciousness), and ahamkara (ego, or, I-maker). Antaḥkaraṇa has also been called the link between the middle and higher mind, the reincarnating part of the mind.

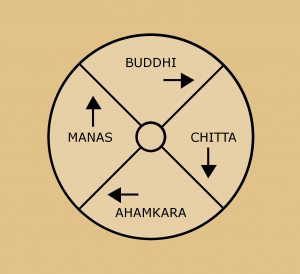
The four functions of Antahkarana

In Vedāntic literature, this antaḥkaraṇa (internal organ) is organised into four parts:

1. ahaṃkāra (ego)— Literally means 'I-maker' because it provides the self with a sense of identity. When the atman's identity is taken to be the body and mind, however, a false sense of identity results
2. buddhi (intellect)—the decision-making part of the mind. The part that is able to discern truth from falsehood and thereby to make wisdom possible. It also entails memory and sleep.
3. manas (mind)—the lower part of the mind that connects with the external world, and controls sankalpa (will or resolution). It is also the faculty of doubt and volition; seat of desire and governor of sensory and motor organs.
4. chitta (memory)—the consciousness where impressions, memories and experiences are stored; the part that deals with remembering and forgetting.

There are three states of consciousness:

1. jāgrat—waking state
2. svapna—dream state
3. suṣupti—deep sleep state

The antaḥkaraṇa is actively functioning in the first two states and dormant in the third state.

Another description says that antaḥkaraṇa refers to the entire psychological process, including mind and emotions, are composing the mind levels, as described above, which are mentioned as a unit that functions with all parts working together as a whole. Furthermore, when considering that mind levels are bodies, they are: manomayakośa – related to manas – the part of mind related to five senses, and also craving for new and pleasant sensations and emotions, while buddhi (intellect, intelligence, capacity to reason), is related to vijñānamayakośa – the body of consciousness, knowledge, intuition and experience.

Antahkarana can also refer to the connection (bridge) between Manas and Buddhi.

== See also ==
- panchakosha
- koshas
- karanopadhi
- philosophy of mind
