= Iconography of Shiva temples in Tamil Nadu =

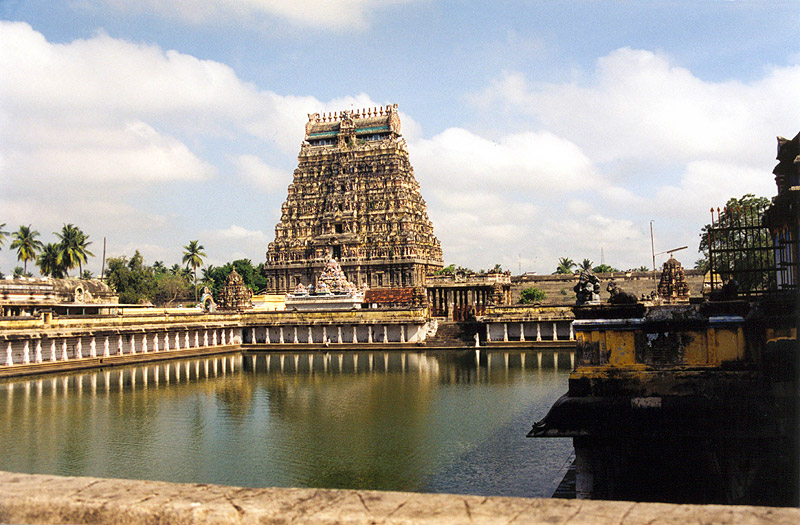
Chidambaram Nataraja temple considered the foremost of all Shiva temples in Tamil Nadu

Iconography of Shiva temples in Tamil Nadu is governed by the Shaiva Agamas (IAST:Āgama) that revere the ultimate reality as the Hindu deity, Shiva. Āgama (Sanskrit: आगम, Tamil: ஆகமம்) in the Hindu religious context means a traditional doctrine or system which commands faith. Temple worship according to Āgamic rules can be said to have started during the Pallava dynasty (551-901 A.D.) in South India, but they were fully under establishment during the Chola dynasty (848-1279 A.D.) The temples during the Chola period expanded to Sri Lanka and islands in South East Asia. The temple complex was expanding with niches for various deities on the stipulated sides of the sanctum. Lingam was universalised and prakarams (precincts) with subsequent deities came up. The temple parivara (deities related to primary deity) expanded considerably during the Chola period. The niches of following Āgamic rules for building Shiva temples in Tamil Nadu, a South Indian state continues even in the modern era. Some of the prime images like that of lingam, Vinayagar and Parvati are present in all the Shiva temples. Almost all the temples follow the same custom during festivals and worship methods with minor exceptions. Most of the Shiva temples in Tamil Nadu and Sri Lanka (like Munneswaram temple, Koneswaram temple, Tennavaram temple, Ketheeswaram temple, Naguleswaram) are built in Dravidian architecture.

== Symbolism behind the structure of a Shiva Temple ==
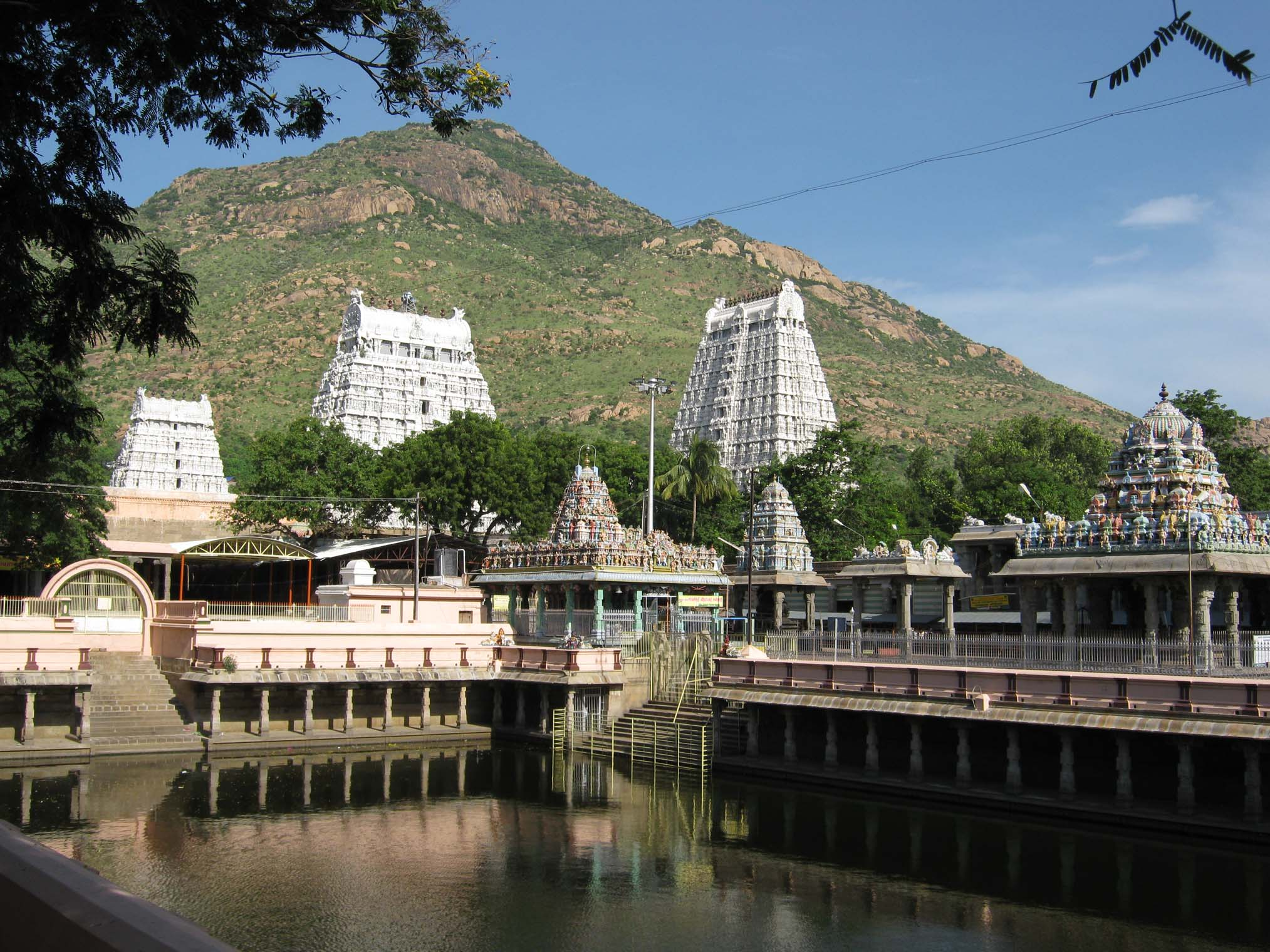
The Annamalaiyar Temple in Thiruvannaamalai, India, an ideal example of Dravidian Architecture

The temple structure resembles the human body with all its subtleties. The five walls encircling one another are the koshas (sheaths) of human existence. The outermost is the Annamaya kosha, symbolizing the material body. The second is Pranamaya kosha, symbolizing the sheath of vital force or prana (breath). The third is Manomaya kosha, symbolizing the sheath of the thoughts, the mana. The fourth is the Vijnanamaya kosha, symbolizing, the sheath of the intellect. The fifth and innermost is the Anandamaya kosha, symbolizing the sheath of bliss.

Dravidian Shiva temples invariably follow the structure, arranged in differing manners, but differing in themselves only according to the age in which they were constructed:

- The principal part of the temple is called the Vimanam, which is the roof of the sanctum sanctorum.
- The porches or Mantapams (halls), which always cover and precede the door leading to the sanctum.
- Gate-pyramids, Gopurams is the principal feature of the temple seen from outside.
- Pillared halls (Chaultris or Chawadis) are used for festivals and daily gatherings.

A temple always contains temple tanks or wells for water called theertham used for sacred purposes of ablution.

== Common terminologies ==
These terminologies are not specific to Shiva temples in Tamil Nadu, but common across all temples built in Tamil architecture.

=== Moola Sannidhi or Garbhagriha ===
Garbhagriha or garbha gṛha (Devanagari: गर्भगॄह) is a Sanskrit word meaning the interior of the sanctum sanctorum, the innermost sanctum of a Hindu temple where resides the murti (idol or icon) of the primary deity of the temple. Literally the word means "womb chamber", from the Sanskrit words garbha for womb and griha for house. Only pujari (priests) are allowed to enter the sanctum.

=== Vimanam ===
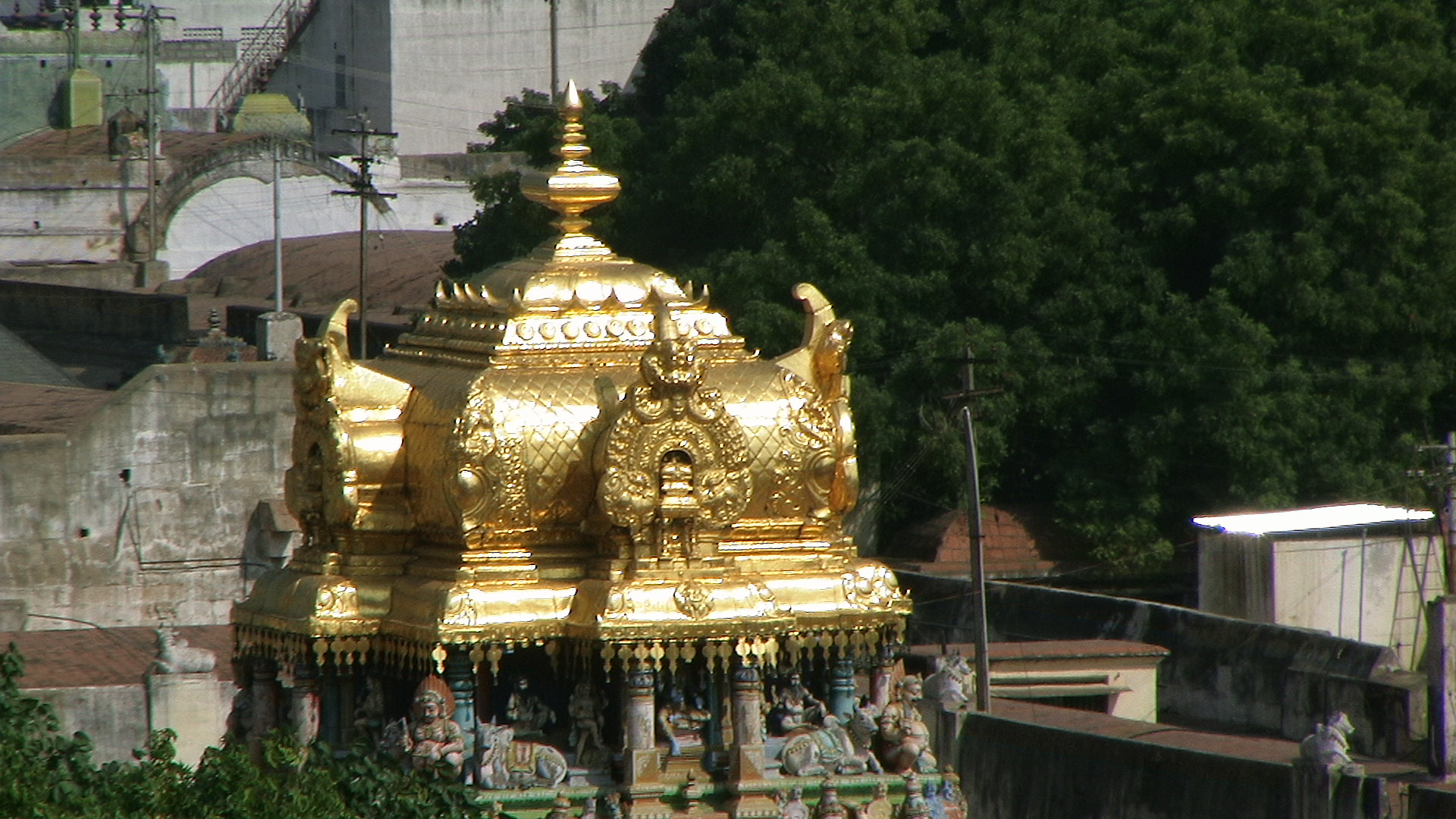
Golden vimana of Madurai Meenakshi Temple

Vimana (Tamil:விமானம்) is a term for the tower above the garbhagriha or Sanctum sanctorum in a Hindu temple. The towering roof of the other deities is also called the vimanam. These do not assume as much significance as the outer gopurams (gateway towers), with the exception of a few temples where the vimanams are as famous as the temple complex - Kanka sabai (Golden stage) at Thillai Nataraja Temple, Chidambaram covered with golden plates and the Ananda Nilayam vimanam of the Tirumala Venkateswara Temple are examples.

=== Prakaram ===
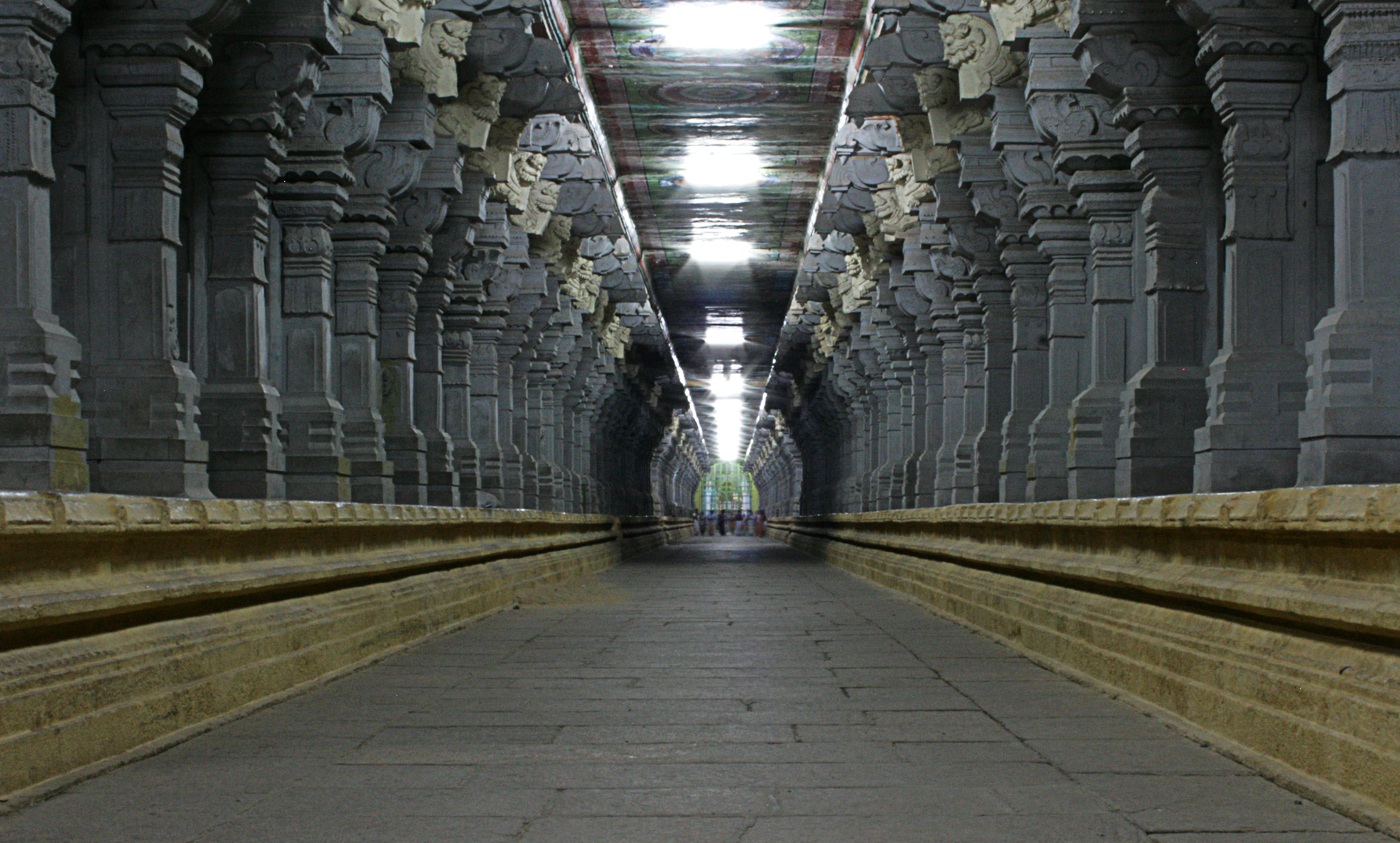
Ramanathaswamy Temple prakaram

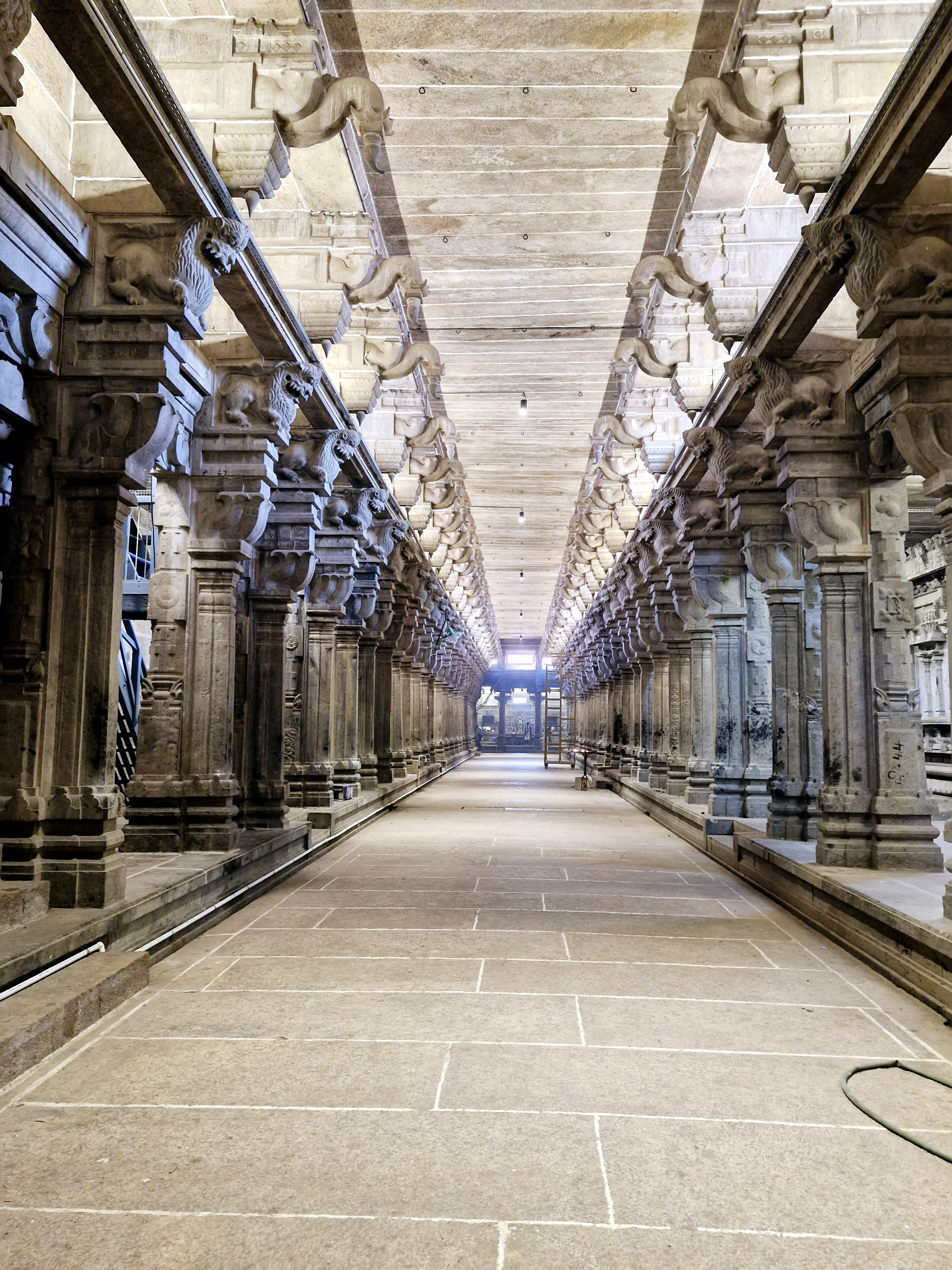
Mayiladuthurai Prakaram

A Prakaram (Tamil: பிரகாரம், Sanskrit: प्राकारम), also spelled Pragaram or Pragaaram) in Indian architecture is an outer part around the Hindu temple sanctum. These may be enclosed or open and are typically enclosed for the inner most prakaram. Typically a Hindu Temple prayer hall is built in front of the temple's sanctum sanctorum (garbhagriha) in the first prakaram.

=== Gopuram ===
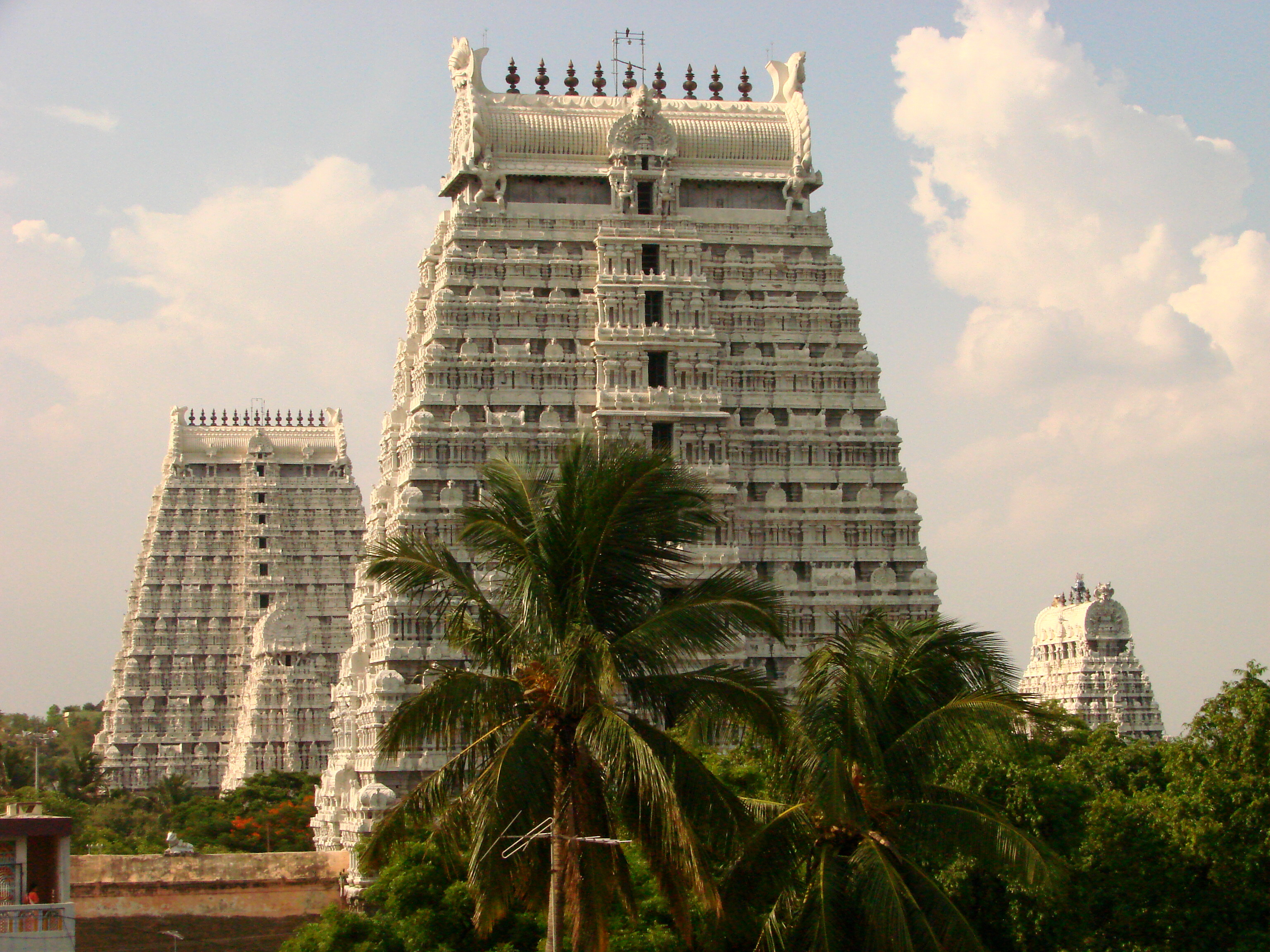
Annamalaiyar Temple gopurams

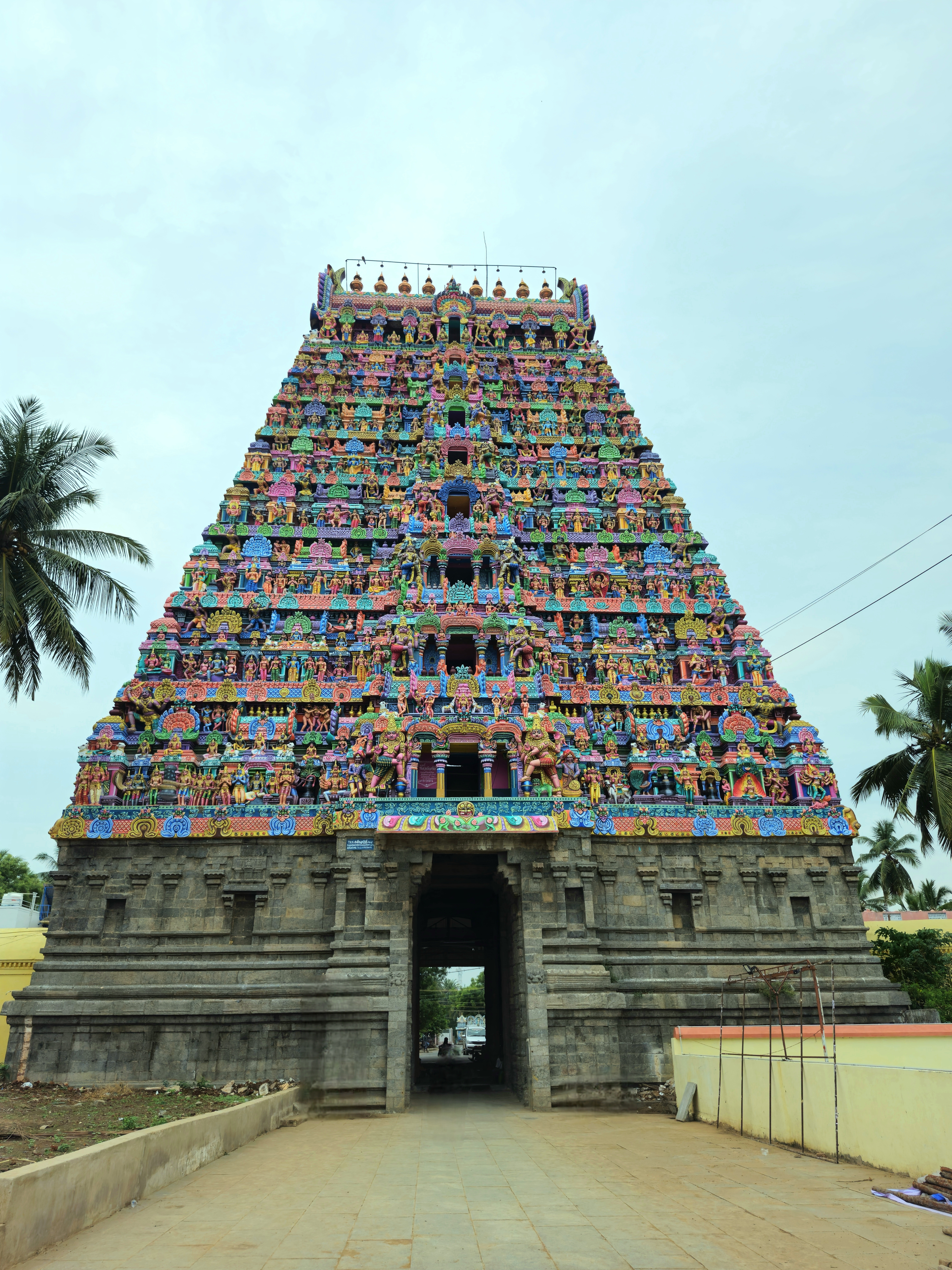
Gopuram of the Mayuranathaswamy Temple, Mayiladuthurai

A Gopuram or Gopura, is a monumental tower, usually ornate, at the entrance of any temple, especially in Southern India. This forms a prominent feature of Koils, Hindu temples of the Dravidian architecture. They are topped by the kalasam, a bulbous stone or metal finial. The gopurams function as gateways through the walls that surround the temple complex.

The gopuram's origins can be traced back to early structures of the Pallava dynasty. By the twelfth century under the Pandya rulers these gateways became a dominant feature of a temple's outer appearance, eventually overshadowing the inner sanctuary obscured from view by the gopuram's colossal size. It also dominated the inner sanctum in amount of ornamentation. Often a shrine has more than one gopuram. The gopuram raises from a square or rectangular granite or brick base to a pyramidal structure with multiple storeys. A temple may have multiple gopurams, typically constructed into multiple walls in tiers around the main shrine. Rajagopuram indicates the prime one of all the gopurams within the temple. It is typically the most commonly used gateway and the tallest of all.

== Main Deities ==
=== Lingam ===
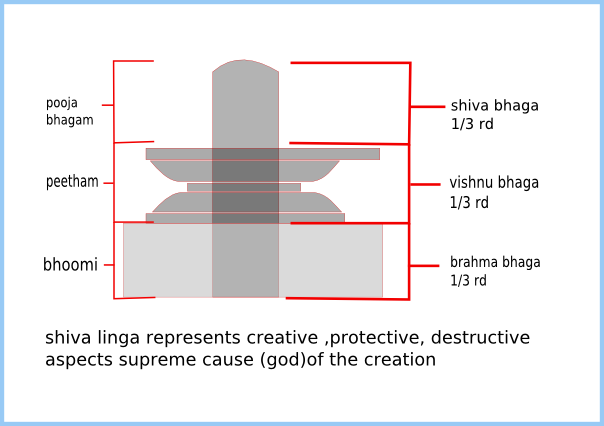
Image of structure of Lingam

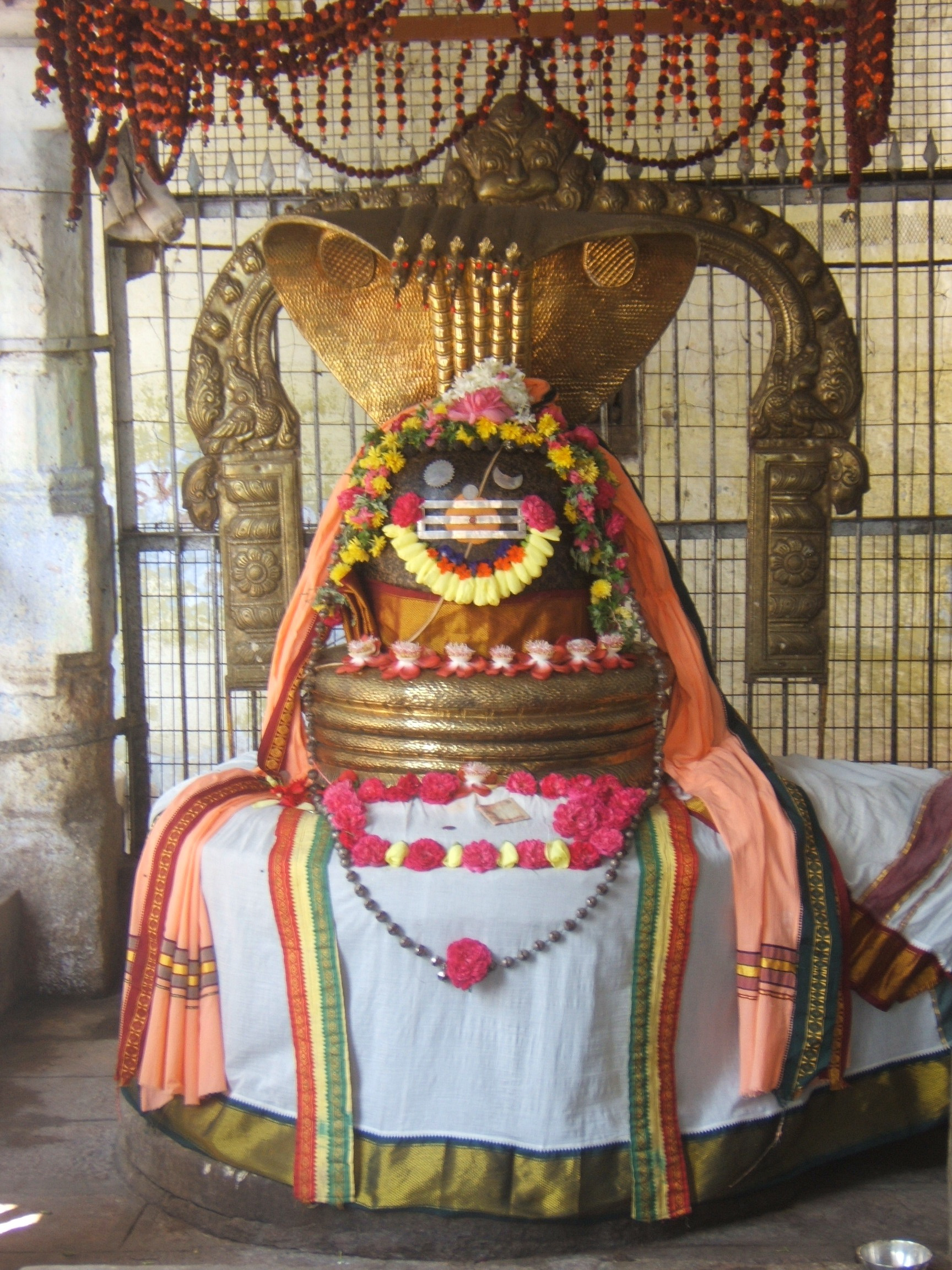
Decorated form of Shiva Lingam

The Lingam (also, Linga, Ling, Shiva linga, Shiv ling, Sanskrit लिङ्गं liṅgaṃ, meaning "mark" or "sign") is a representation of the Hindu deity Shiva used for worship in Hindu temple. The lingam is the principal deity in most Shiva temples in South India. The lingam is often represented with the Yoni, a symbol of the goddess or of Shakti, female creative energy. The union of lingam and yoni represents the "indivisible two-in-oneness of male and female, the passive space and active time from which all life originates". A complementary theory suggests that the Lingam represents the beginning and ending Stambha pillar symbolizing the infinite nature of Shiva. The propagation of linga worship on a large scale in South India is believed to be from Chola times (late 7th century A.D.), through Rig veda, the oldest literature details about worshipping Shiva in the form of linga. Pallavas propagated Somaskanda as the principal form of worship, slightly deviating from the Shaiva agamas; Cholas being strict shaivas, established lingams in all the temples. The relation between Shiva and the lingam extends to the Indus Valley civilization, where several remains, such as the round stone caps at Harappa and the well-known seal of polycelphalic yogi (saint), have led scholars to attribute the primordial native origin. Svayambu lingam indicates a lingam that comes into existence on its own accord and not erected by human beings. Some of the temples are built around the lingam, with its position maintained as the sanctum.

The temple structures is divided into five lingams with the main one at the sanctum supplying power to the rest. The others are dhvaja lingam or flag lingam (signifying flag pole), bhadra lingam or prosperous lingam (signifying the bali pitha), stupa lingam (signifying vimana tower) that raises over sanctum and the sacrificer or officiating priest.

=== Parvati ===
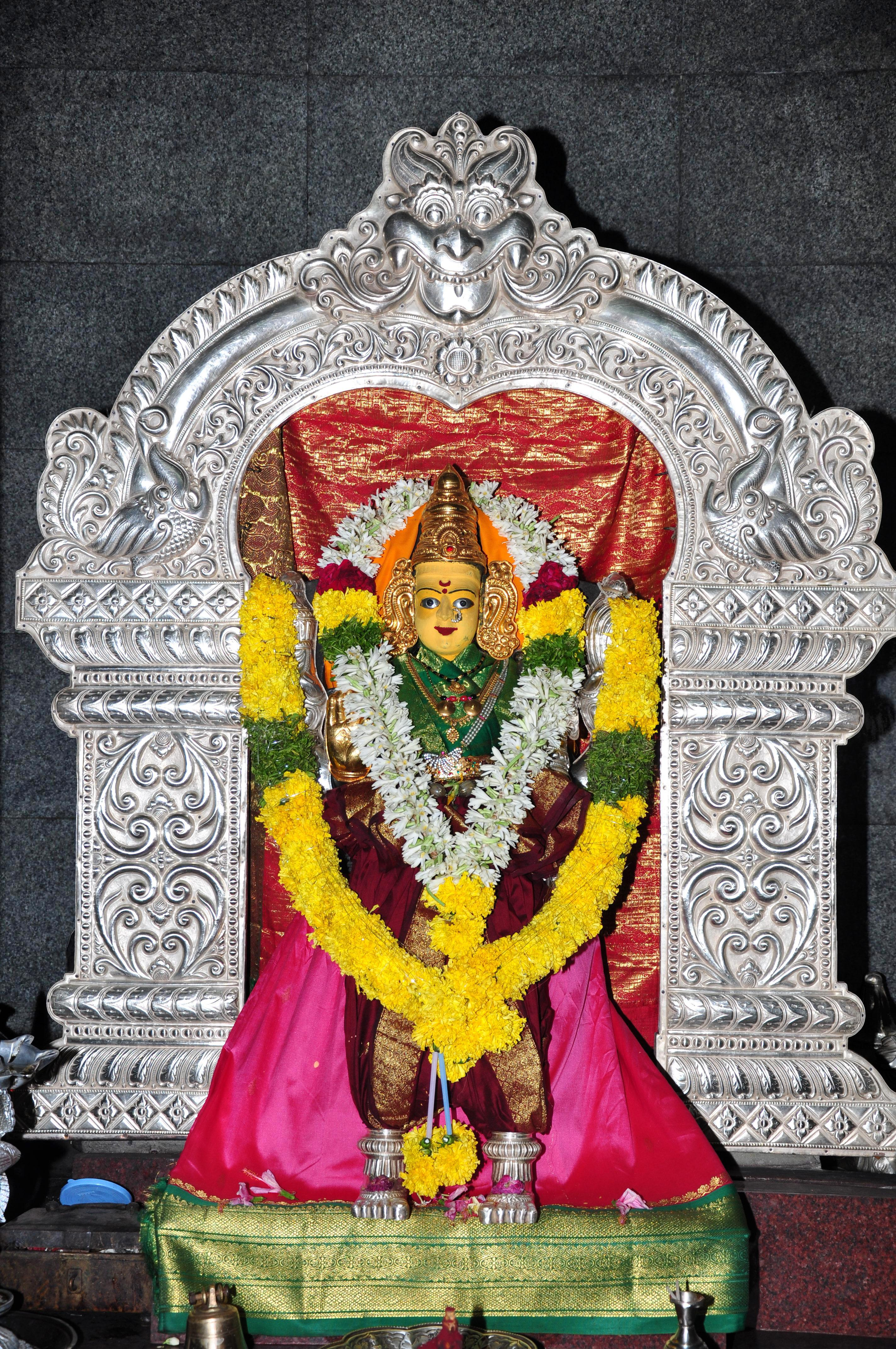
Parvati Shrine within a Shiva temple

Parvati (Sanskrit: पार्वती, IAST: Pārvatī) is a Hindu goddess. Shaiva tradition is replete with a number of form of goddesses and all of the consorts, Parvati is the most celebrated and artistic. Parvati is nominally the second consort of Shiva, the Hindu god of destruction and rejuvenation. However, she is not different from Satī, being the reincarnation of Shiva's wife. Parvati is the mother of the gods and goddess, Ganesha and Skanda (Kartikeya). Some communities believe her to be the sister of Vishnu. Parvati, when depicted alongside Shiva, generally appears with two arms, but when alone, she is shown having four or eight arms, and astride a tiger or lion. Generally considered a benevolent goddess, Parvati also has wrathful incarnations, such as Durga, Kali, Shitala Devi, Tara, Chandi, and the Mahavidyas as well as benevolent forms like Kathyayini, Mahagauri, Kamalatmika, Bhuvaneshwari, and Lalita.

=== Ganesha ===
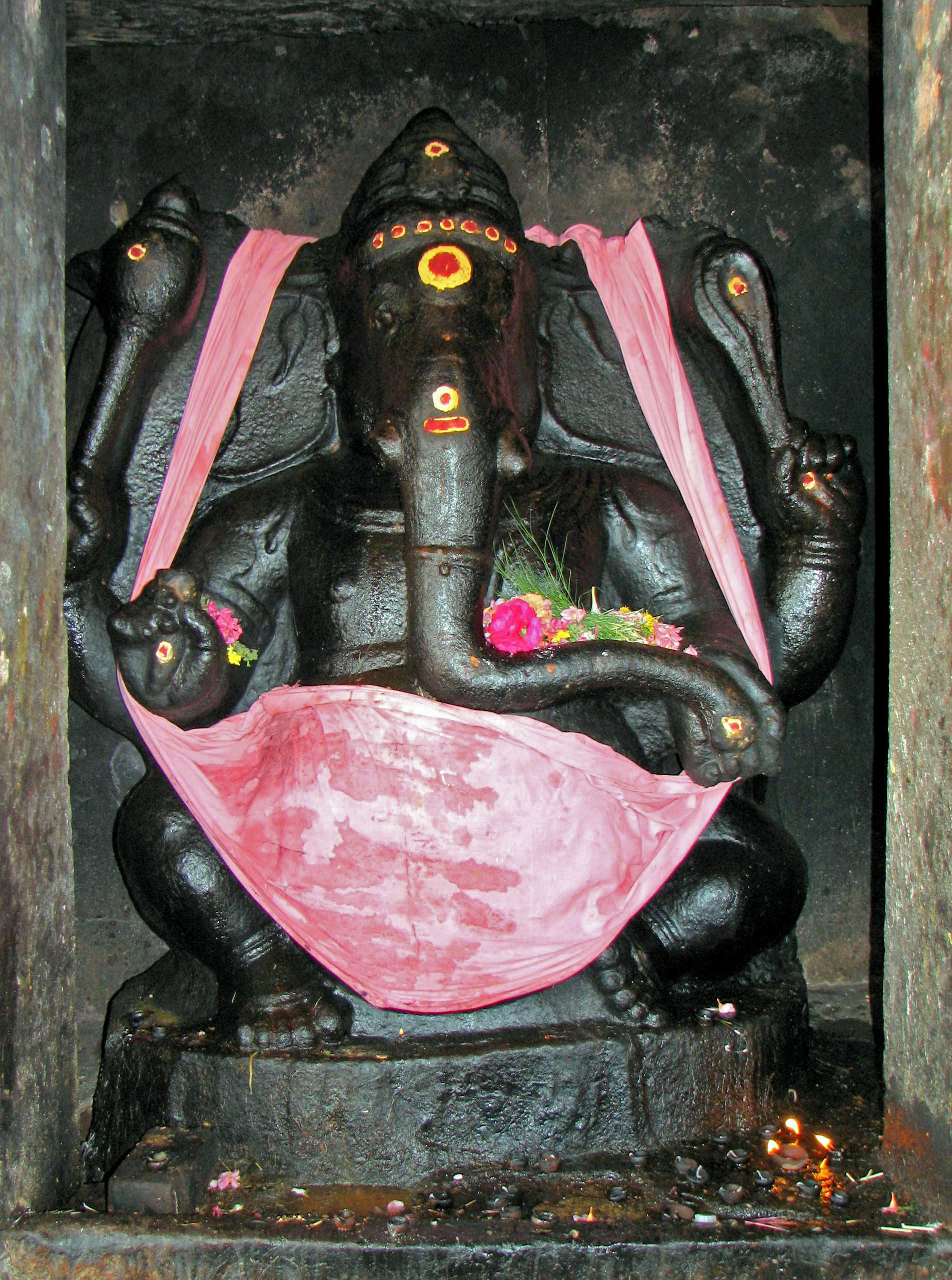
The shrine of Ganesa inside a temple

Ganesha (Sanskrit: गणेश; IAST: Gaṇeśa;), also spelled Ganesa or Ganesh, also known as Ganapati (Sanskrit: गणपति, IAST: gaṇapati), Vinayaka (Sanskrit: विनायक; IAST: Vināyaka), and Pillaiyar (Tamil: பிள்ளையார்), is one of the deities best-known and most widely worshipped in the Hindu pantheon. Ganesa is the first son of Shiva and is given the primary importance in all Shiva temples with all worship starting from him. Local legend states the Tamil word Pillayar splits into Pillai and yaar meaning who is this son, but scholars believe it is derived from the Sanskrit word pulisara meaning elephant. K. A. Nilakanta Sastri (1963:57-58) thinks that Pallavas adopted the Ganesa motif from Chalukyas. During the 7th century, Vatapi Ganapati idol was brought from Badami (Vatapi - Chalukya capital) by Paranjothi, the general of Pallavas who defeated Chalukyas.

=== Skanda ===
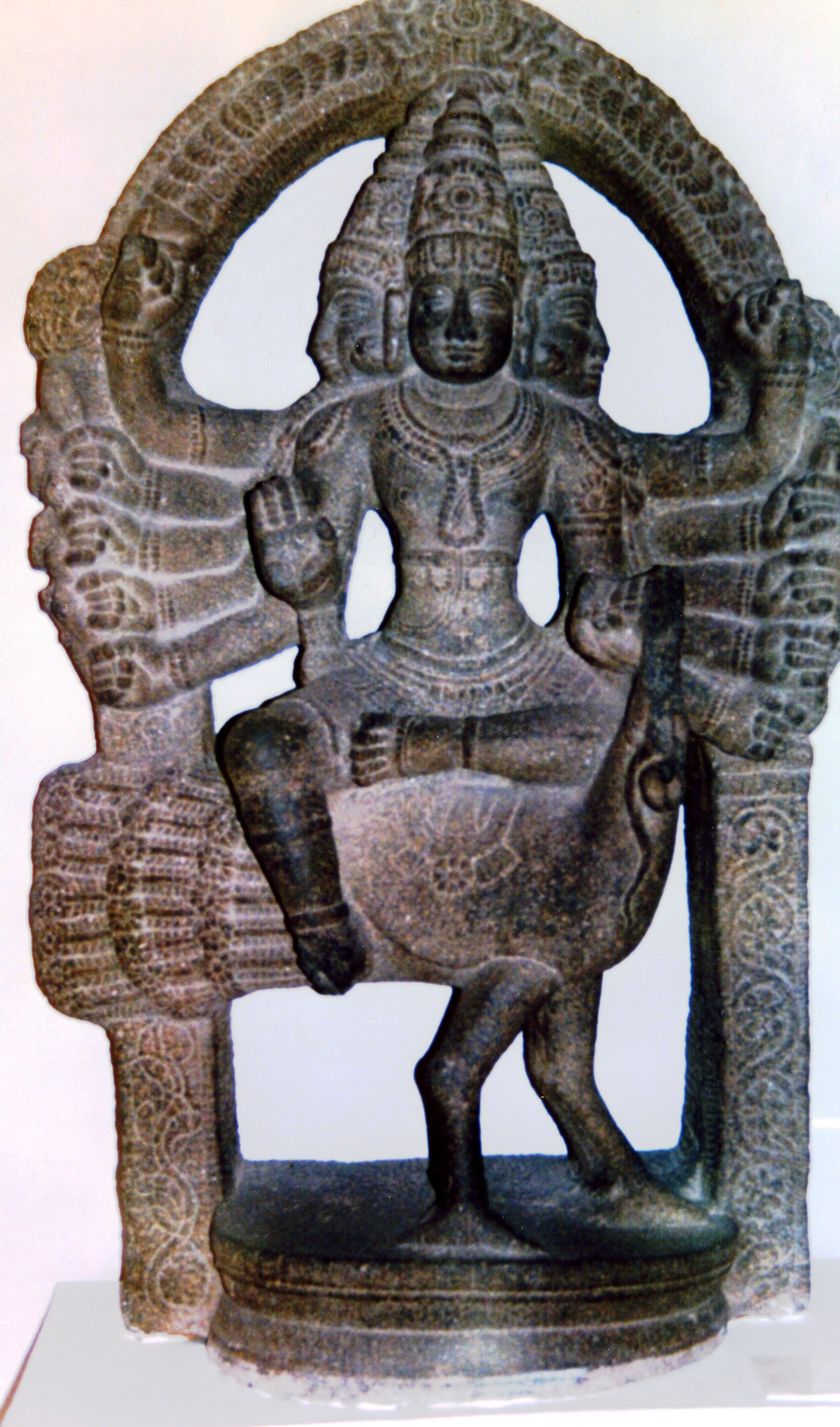
Image of Skanda, the six faced God

Murugan (Tamil: முருகன், Sanskrit:सुब्रह्मण्य, Sanskrit: कार्तिकेय) also called Kartikeya, Skanda and Subrahmanya, is more popular in South India especially among Tamil people famously referred as Thamizh Kadavul (God of Tamils). He is the patron deity of the Tamil land (Tamil Nadu). Like most Hindu deities, he is known by many other names, including Senthil (Smart), Saravaṇa, Kārtikeya (meaning 'son of Krittika' ), Arumugam, Sanmuga(from Sanskrit Ṣaṇmukha), Shadanana (meaning 'one with six faces'), Kumāra (meaning 'child or son'), Guhan or Guruhuha (meaning 'cave-dweller'), Skanda (meaning 'that which is spilled or oozed, namely seed' in Sanskrit), Subrahmaṇya, Vēlaṇ and Swaminatha. Tolkappiyam, possibly the most ancient of the extant Sangam works, dated between the 3rd century BCE and 5th century CE glorified Murugan, " the red god seated on the blue peacock, who is ever young and resplendent," and " the favoured god of the Tamils.". The Sangam poetry divided space and Tamil land into five allegorical areas and according to the Tirumurugarruppatai (circa 400-450 A.D.) attributed to the great Sangam poet Nakkiirar, Murugan was the presiding deity of the Kurinci region (hilly area). Tirumurugaruppatai is a deeply devotional poem included in the ten idylls (Pattupattu) of the age of the third Sangam. The cult of Skanda disappeared during the 6th century and was predominantly expanded during late 7th century Pallava period - Somaskanda sculptured panels of the Pallava period stand as a testament.

== Other images ==
Shiva is worshipped in nine forms: Lingam, Lingodbhava, Chandrashekhara, Somaskanda, Bhairava, Virabhadra, Nataraja, and Dakshinamurti.

=== Lingodbhava ===
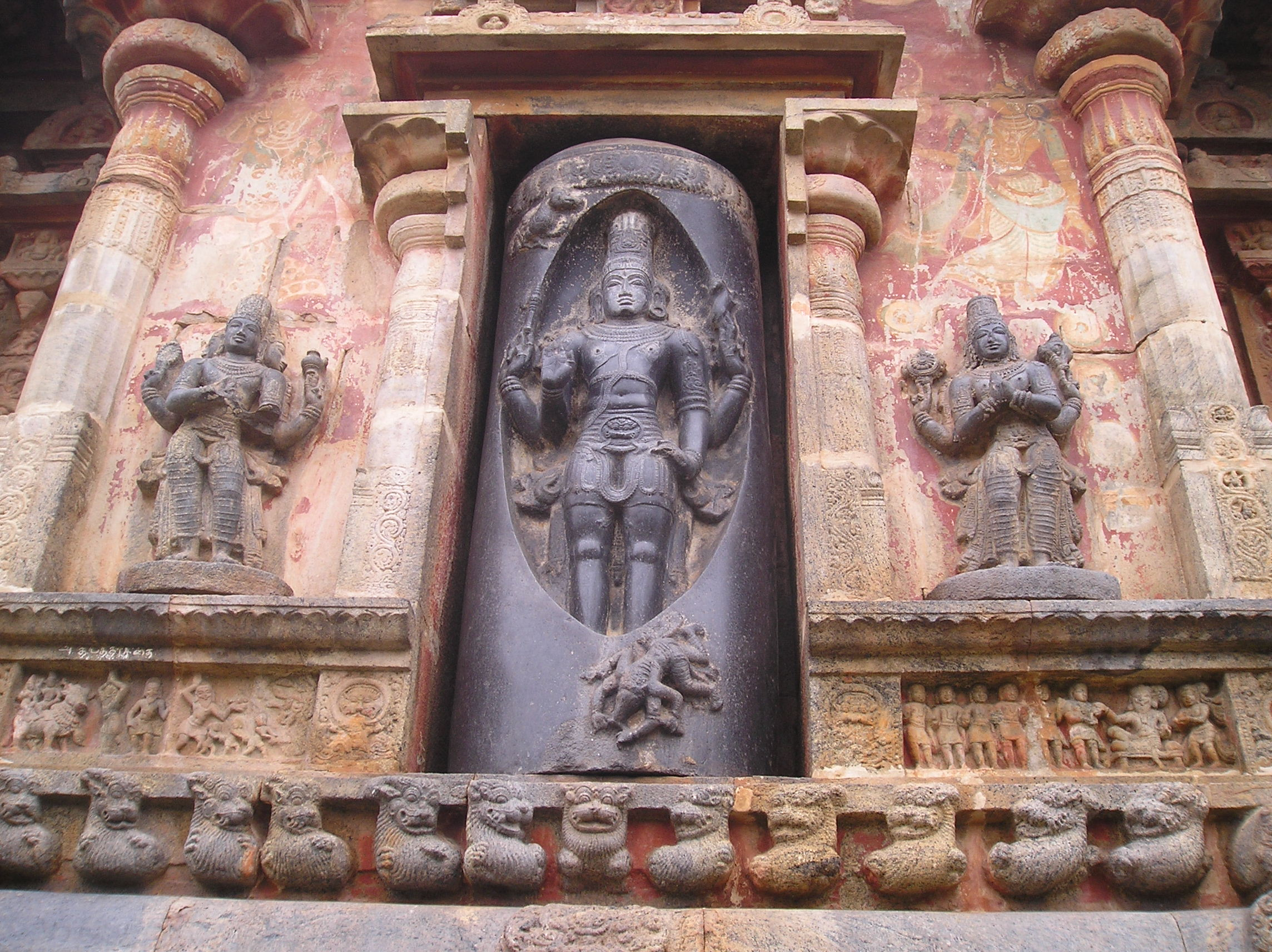
Lingodbhava or emergence of the lingam

Lingodbhava or emergence of lingam, found in various Puranas as a symbol of Shiva, augments the synthesis of the old cults of pillar and phallic worship. The idea emerged from deity residing in a pillar and later visualised as Shiva emerging from the lingam. The lingodbhava image can be found in the first precinct around the sanctum in the wall exactly behind the image of Shiva. Appar, one of the early Shaivite saint of the 7th century, gives evidence of this knowledge of puranic episodes relating to Lingodbhava form of Shiva while Sambandar refers this form of Shiva as the nature of light that could not be comprehended by Brahma and Vishnu.

=== Nataraja ===
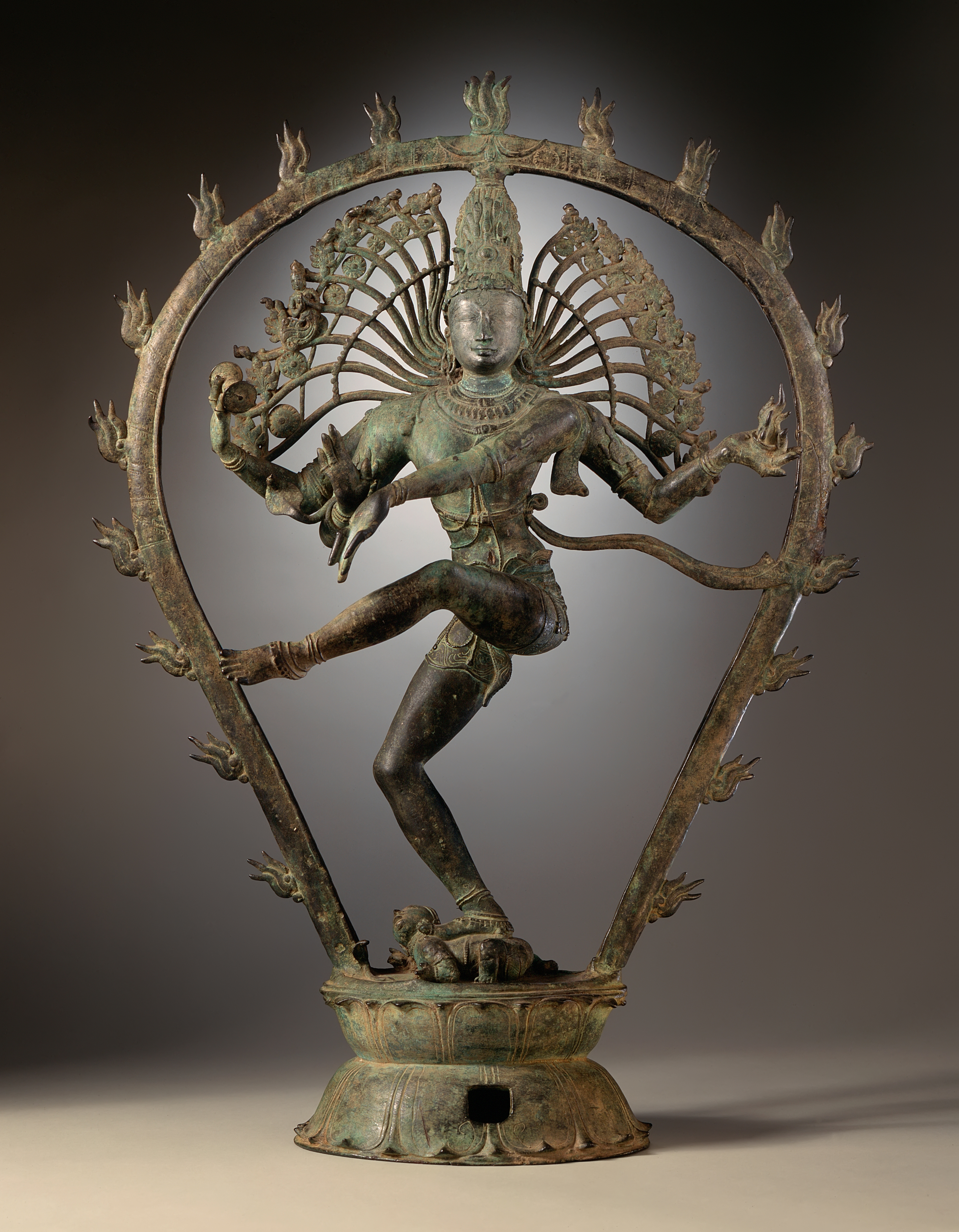
Shiva Nataraja, the Lord of the Dance

Nataraja or Kuththan (Tamil: கூத்தன்) is a depiction of the Hindu god Shiva as the cosmic dancer who performs his divine dance to destroy a weary universe and make preparations for god Brahma to start the process of creation. A Tamil concept, Shiva was first depicted as Nataraja in the famous Chola bronzes and sculptures of Chidambaram. The dance of Shiva in Tillai, the traditional name for Chidambaram, forms the motif for all the depictions of Shiva as Nataraja. He is also known as Sabesan, which means "The lord who dances on the dais". The form is present in most Shiva temples in South India, and is the main deity in the famous temple at Chidambaram. The sculpture is usually made in bronze, with Shiva dancing in an aureole of flames, lifting his left leg (or in rare cases, the right leg) and balancing over a demon or dwarf (Apasmara) who symbolizes ignorance.

=== Dakshinamurti ===
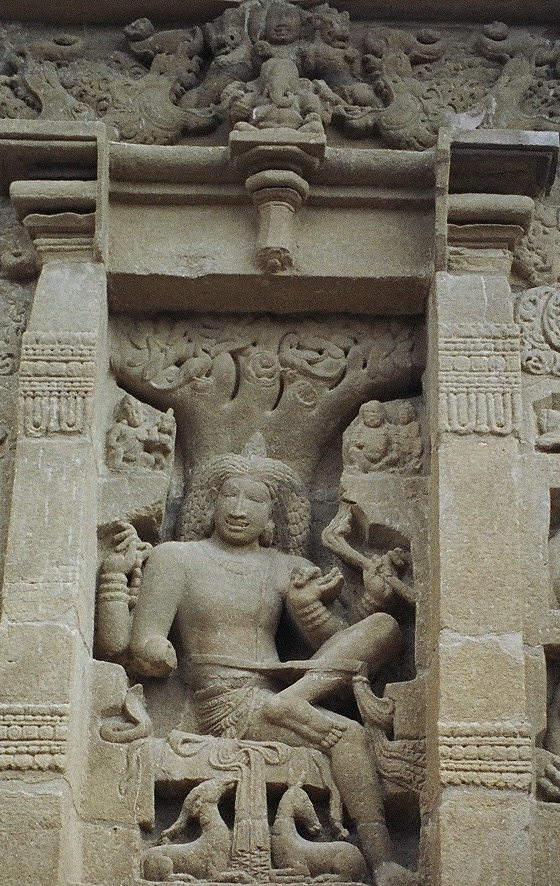
Dakshinamurti

Dakshinamurti or Jnana Dakshinamurti (Tamil: தட்சிணாமூர்த்தி, Sanskrit: दक्षिणामूर्ति IAST: Dakṣiṇāmūrti) is an aspect of Shiva as a guru (teacher) of all fields. This aspect of Shiva is his personification of the ultimate awareness, understanding and knowledge. The image depicts Shiva as a teacher of yoga, music, and wisdom, and giving exposition on the Shastras to his disciples. He is worshipped as the god of wisdom, complete and rewarding meditation. This form of Shiva is popular in the Southern states of India especially Tamil Nadu. Dakshina indicates south and this deity is south facing usually depicted in the wall of first precinct around the sanctum.

=== Somaskanda ===
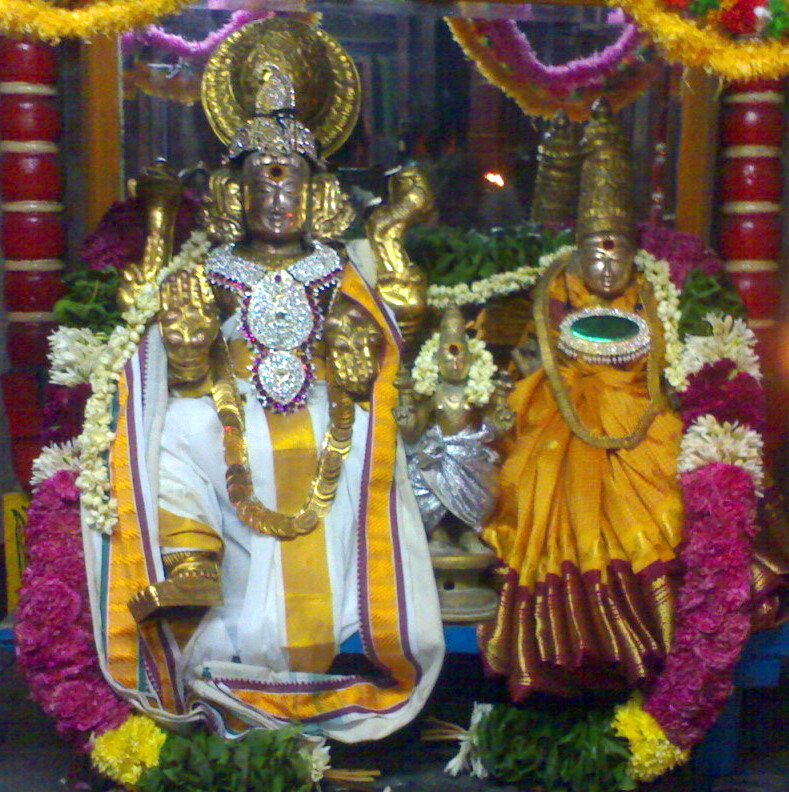
Murti of Somaskanda - Shiva accompanied by Skanda the child and Parvati

Somaskanda derives from Sa (Shiva) with Uma (Parvati) and Skanda (child Murugan). It is the form of Shiva where he is accompanied by Skanda the child and Paravati his consort in sitting posture. Though it is a Sanskrit name, it is a Tamil concept and Somaskandas are not found in North Indian temples. In the Tiruvarur Thygarajar Temple, the principal deity is Somaskanda under the name of Thyagaraja. All temples in the Thygaraja cult have images of Somaskanda as Thyagarajar - though iconographically similar, they are iconologically different. Architecturally when there are separate shrines dedicated to the utsava (festival deity) of Somaskanda, they are called Thyagaraja shrines. Unlike Nataraja, which is a Chola development, Somaskanda was prominent even during the Pallava period much earlier to Cholas. References to the evolution of the Somaskanda concept are found from Pallava period from the 7th century A.D. in carved rear stone walls of Pallava temple sanctums. There are 40 such images of Somaskanda found in different temples including the Kailasanthar temple at Kanchipuram. Most of the images are attributed to Rajasimha Pallava (700-728 A.D.), Mahendra Pallava (580-630 A.D.), Narasimha Pallava (630-668 A.D.) and Parameswara Pallava (670-700 A.D.). Somaskanda was the principal deity during the Pallava period replacing lingam, including the temples at Mahabalipuram, a UNESCO world heritage site. But the cult was not popular and Somaskanda images were relegated to subshrines. Sangam literature does not mention Somaskanda and references in literature are found in the 7th century Tevaram. Somaskanda's continuing importance is highlighted by the fact that the deity takes prominence in all the prime festivals.

=== Chandeshvara Nayanar ===
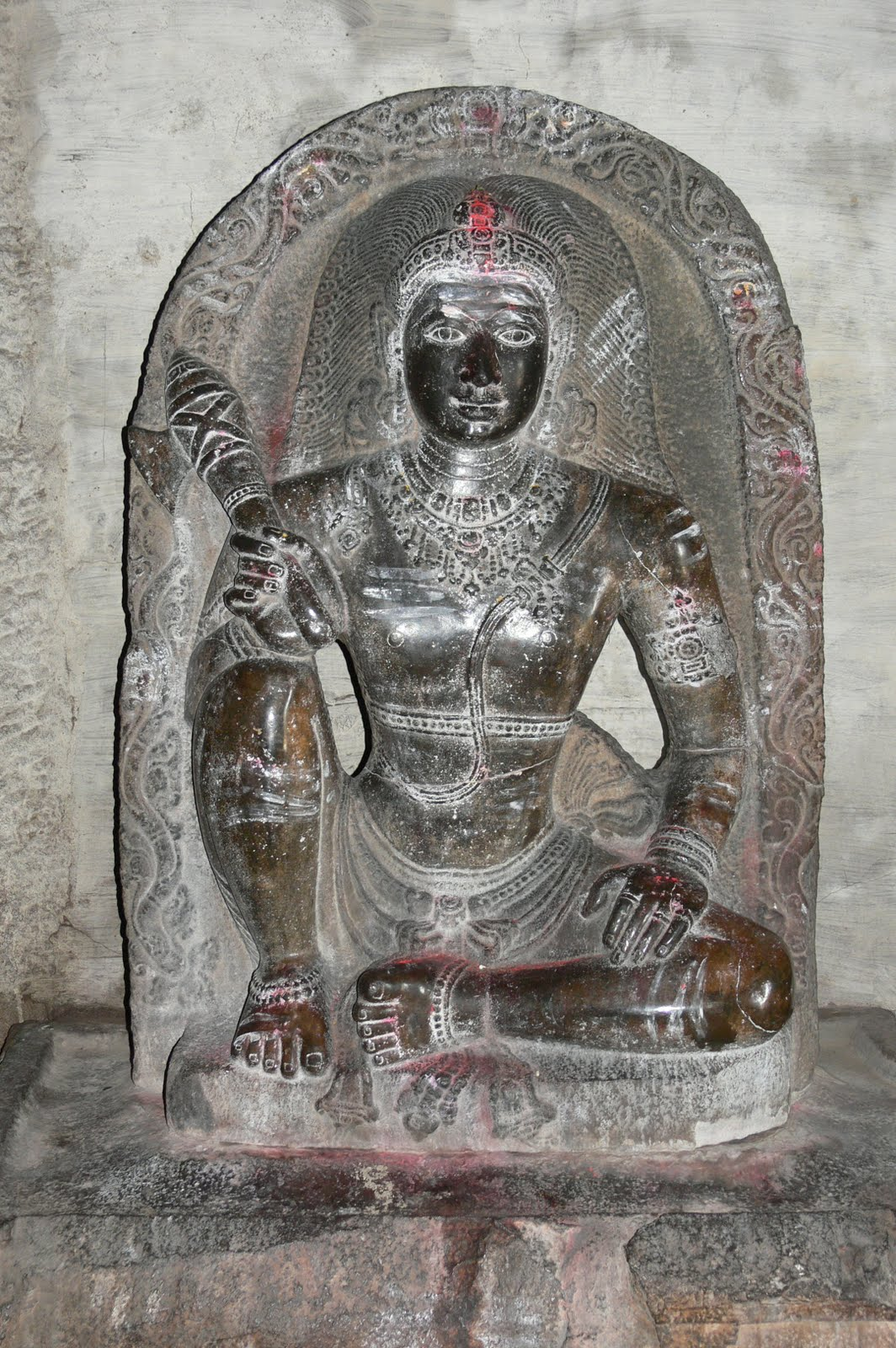
Image of Chandeshvara Nayanar with an axe

Chandeshvara Nayanar is one of the 63 Nayanars, Shaiva saints of the 7th-10th century. According to legend, there once lived a young boy Chandesa who offered the milk given to him for sale to the ablution of lingam he made of sand. His father kicked the lingam in anger, whereupon the boy cut off his father's leg with an axe. Shiva appeared and appointed him as the chief of ganas (attendants), and decreed that Chandesa must also be worshipped daily in Shiva temples. The image of the Nayanar with an axe in his hand is present in the first precinct around the sanctum in all Shiva temples in Tamil Nadu.

=== Bhairava ===
Bhairava (Sanskrit: भैरव, "Terrible" or "Frightful",), sometimes known as Bhairo or Bhairon or Bhairadya or Bheruji (In Rajasthan), is the fierce manifestation of Shiva associated with annihilation. He is depicted ornamented with a range of twisted serpents, which serve as earrings, bracelets, anklets, and sacred thread (yajnopavita). He wears a tiger skin and a ritual apron composed of human bones. Bhairava has a dog (Shvana) as his divine vahana (vehicle). Bhairava is known as Vairavar in Tamil where he is often presented as a grama devata or village deity who safeguards the devotee on all eight directions. In Chola times, Bhairava was referred to as Bhikshatanar, a mendicant, and the image can be found in most Chola temples.

=== Navagraha ===
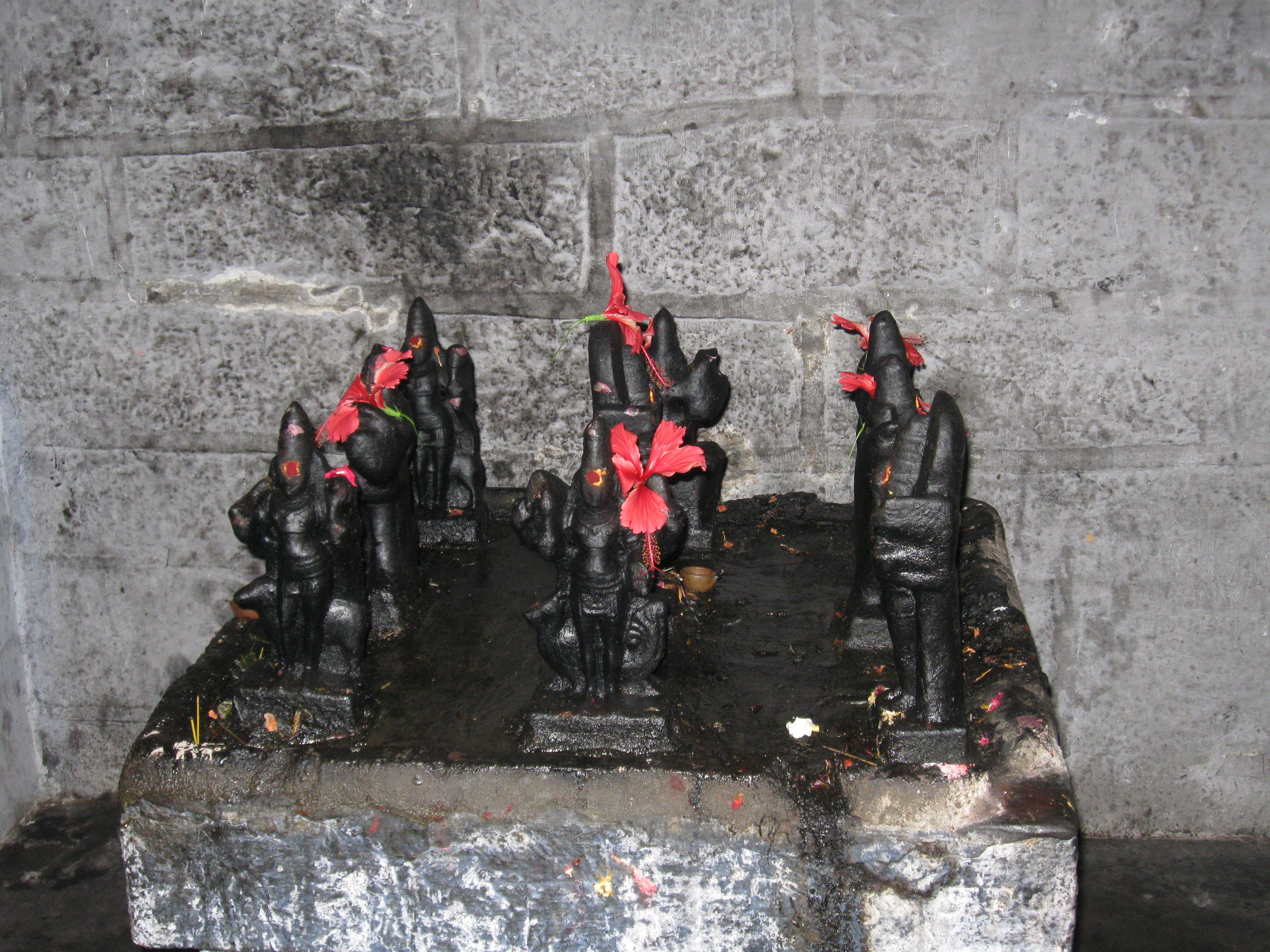
The traditional arrangement of the Navagraha

Graha (from Sanskrit ग्रह gráha—seizing, laying hold of, holding) is a 'cosmic influencer' on the living beings of mother Bhumi (Earth). In Hindu astrology, the Navagraha (Sanskrit: नवग्रह, nine seizers or nine influencers) are some of these major influencers. All the navagraha have relative movement with respect to the background of fixed stars in the zodiac. This includes the planets: Mars, Mercury, Jupiter, Venus, and Saturn, the Sun, the Moon, as well as positions in the sky, Rahu (north or ascending lunar node) and Ketu (south or descending lunar node).

As per Hindu customs, the Navagraha are typically placed in a single square with the Sun (Surya) in the center and the other deities surrounding Surya; no two of them are made to face each other. In South India, their images are generally found in all important Shiva temples. They are invariably placed in a separate hall, on a pedestal of about three feet in height, usually to the north-east of the sanctum sanctorum.

There are two kinds of installation of the planets when arranged in this fashion, known as Agama Pradishta and Vaidika Pradishta. In Agama Pradishta, Surya occupies the central place, Chandra on Surya's east, Budha on his south, Brihaspati on his west, Shukra on his north, Mangala on his south-east, Shani on his south-west, Rahu on north-west and Ketu in the north-east. Temples such as Suryanar temple, Tiruvidadaimarudur, Tiruvaiyaru and Tirucchirappalli follow this system. In Vaidika Pradishta, Surya is still in the centre, but Shukra is in the east, Mangala in the south, Shani in the west, Brihaspati in the north, Chandra in the south-east, Rahu in the south-west, Ketu in the north-west and Budha in the north-east.

=== Durga ===
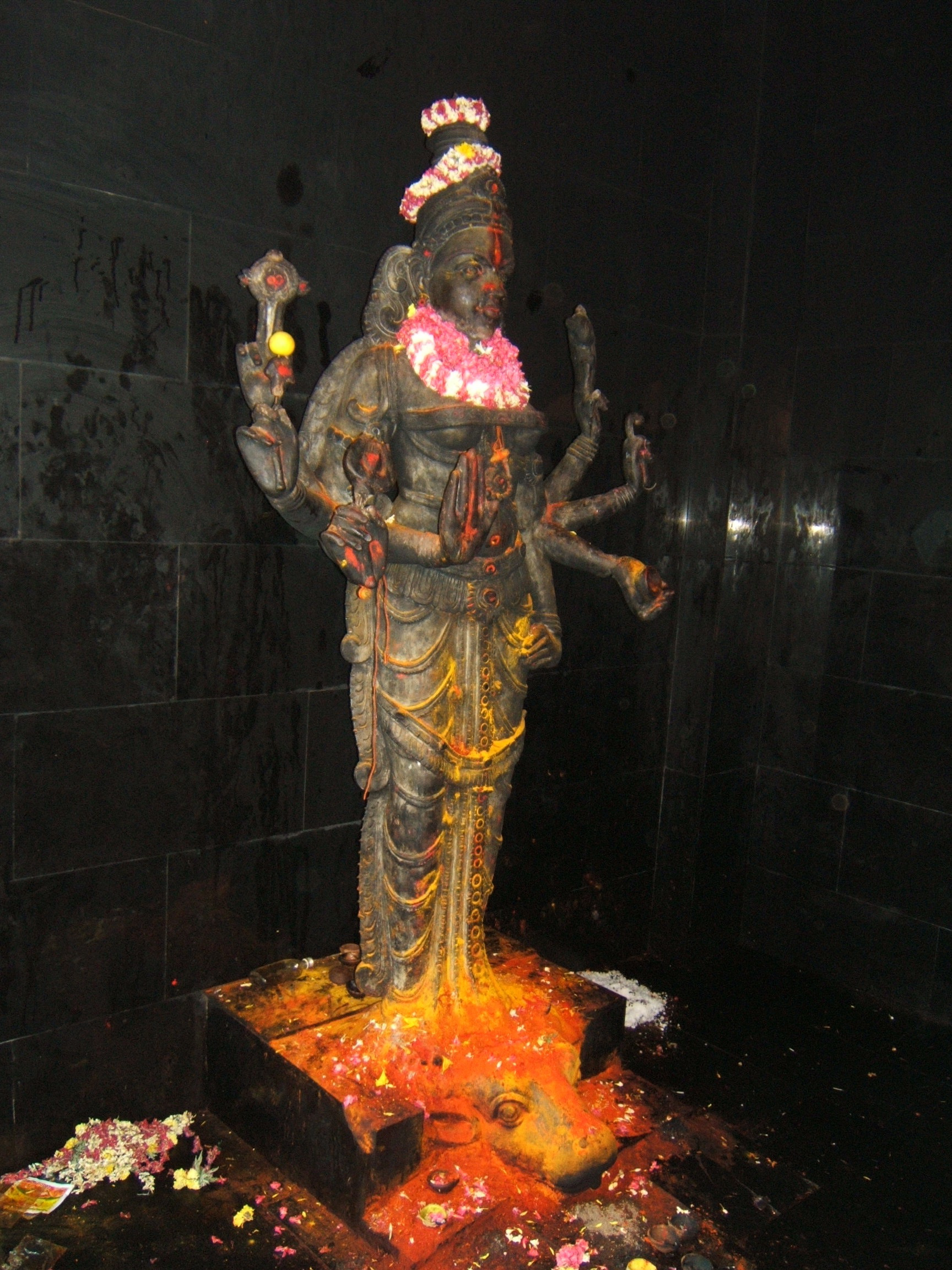
Image of Durga in sculpture

Durga (Sanskrit: दुर्गा); (listen: Durga); meaning "the inaccessible" or "the invincible"; "one who can redeem in situations of utmost distress" is a form of Devi, the supremely radiant goddess, depicted as having eighteen arms, riding a lion or a tiger, carrying weapons and a lotus flower, maintaining a meditative smile, and practicing mudras, or symbolic hand gestures. The name is made of Sanskrit dur- = "with difficulty" (compare Greek δυσ- (dys-)) and gā ("come", "go"). The buffalo sacrifice depiction transposes into ritual Durga's feat killing the buffalo demon. The deity is north facing usually depicted in the wall of first precinct around the sanctum. In Tamil Nadu Shiva temples, she stands gracefully on the severed head of buffalo and lion is rarely included.

=== Saptamatrika ===
The Sapthamatrika are a group of seven Hindu goddesses who are always depicted together. Since they are usually depicted as a heptad, they are called Saptamatrikas (Sanskrit: saptamātṝkās, सप्तमातृका, "seven mothers"): Brahmani, Vaishnavi, Maheshvari, Indrani, Kaumari, Varahi and Chamunda or Narasimhi. In Tamil Nadu temples, the saptamatrika are rarely represented in the dancing form compared to their northern counterparts.

== Other structurals ==
=== Dvajasthamba and Pali Peedam ===
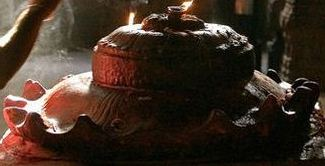
Image of Pali peedam with lotus petals

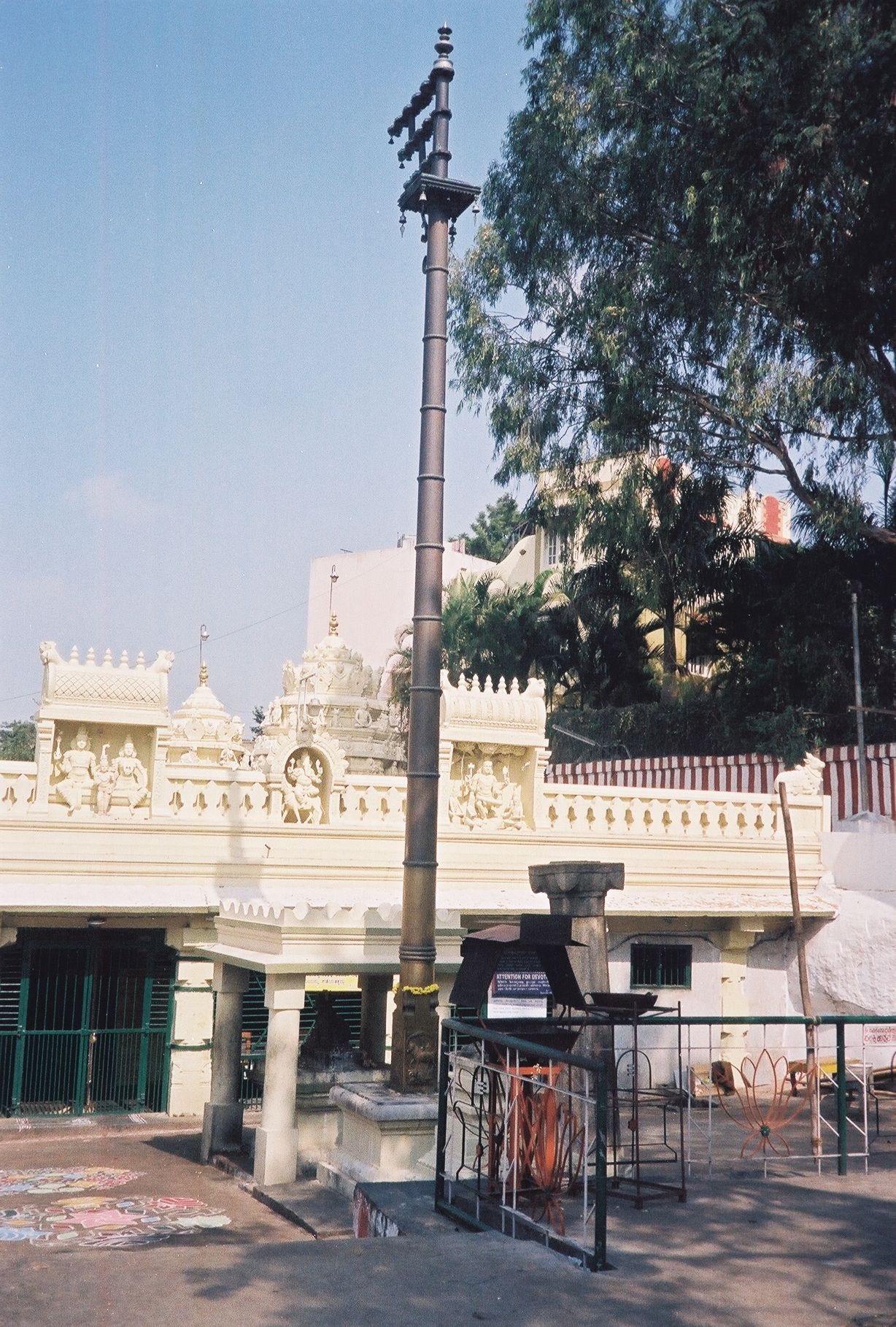
The Dvajasthamba (kodi maram or flag staff) of a temple

Near the main entrance of the temple are situated the Dvajasthamba, sacrificial altar called pali peedam and vehicle called vahanam facing the main deity. Pali Peedam or altar is for offering - Shiva temples being vegetarian, the offering is usually flowers and cooked rice. Most Shiva temples in South India have one in each direction and some have as many as 8 for the 8 directions. The usual shape of the altar is a stone of masonry on a platform topped by lotifarm altar, called the lotus altar. The lotifarm altar has a base, a cup shaped upside down over it and lotus like petals from the frills that widen towards the base. The lotifram shape is considered a symbole of prosperity and hence this is considered bhadra linga or the prosperour lingam. Dvajasthamba is the flag tree of flag pole. It is a cylindrical structure usually located after the first gopuram behind the vahana in Agamic temples. The flag staff can have a three-part division with the top representing Shiva, middle Vishnu and lower half Brahma.

=== Nandi ===
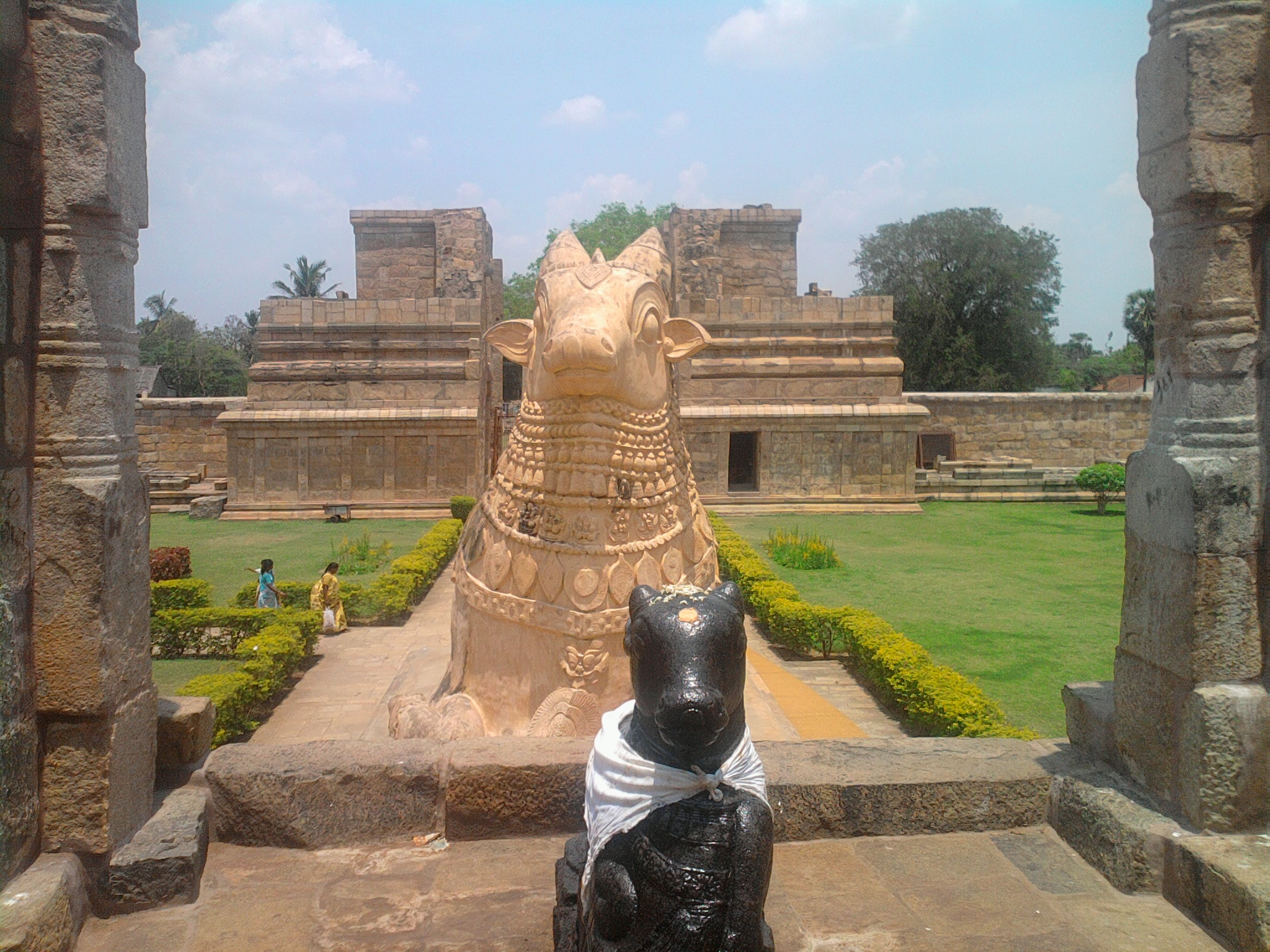
Image of Nandi

Each main deity of the Shiva temple has a vehicle associated with them - Shiva has Nandi (sacred bull), Parvati has lion, Muruga has peacock and Vinayagar has mice. Nandi or Nandin (Tamil: நந்தி Sanskrit: नंदी), is now universally supposed to be the name for the bull which serves as the mount (Sanskrit: vāhana) of Shiva and as the gate keeper of Shiva and Parvati in Hindu mythology. Temples venerating Shiva and Parvati display stone images of a seated Nandi, generally facing the main shrine. There are also a number of temples dedicated solely to Nandi.

But the application of the name Nandin to the bull (Sanskrit: vṛṣabha) is in fact a development of recent centuries, as Gouriswar Bhattacharya has documented in an illustrated article entitled "Nandin and Vṛṣabha".

=== Nayanmars ===
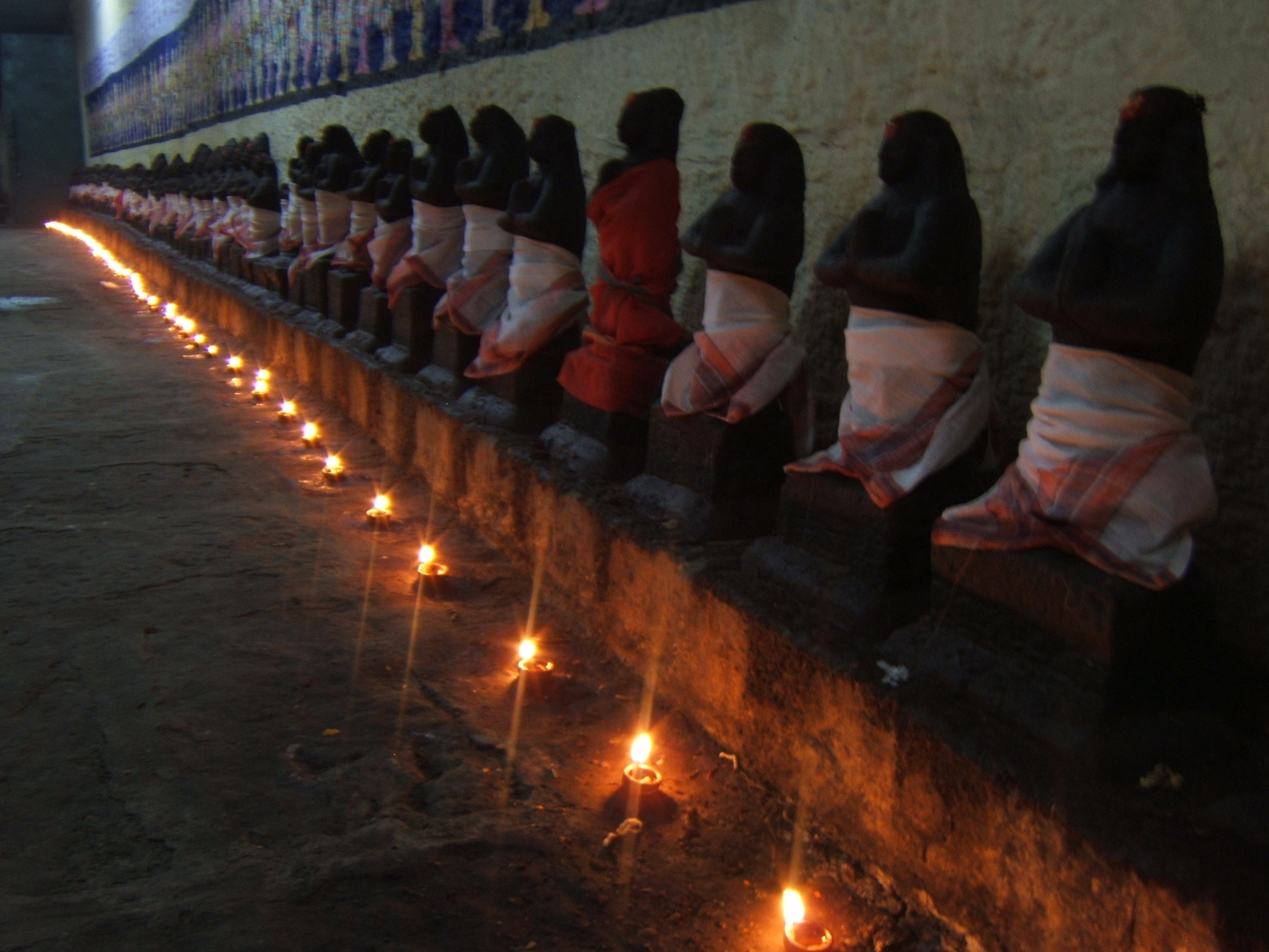
The 63 Nayanars

Some of the large Shiva temples in Tamil Nadu have the shrines of the 63 Shaivite saints called nayanmars or Arubathimoovar, belonging to the 6th to 9th century A.D. Some smaller temples carry the images of the 4 prime nayanmars namely Appar, Tirugnana Sambandar, Sundarar and Manickavasagar. Paadal Petra Sthalam are 275 temples that are revered in the verses of Tevaram by the three nayanmars in the 6th-9th century CE and are amongst the prime Shiva temples of the continent. The Vaippu Sthalangal are places that were mentioned casually in the songs in Tevaram. A posture or symbol was associated with each saint, and every generation of sculptors has followed the convention without any individual identity.

=== Utsava deities ===
Each of the main deity has a festival image called utsavar associated with them. These utsavars are usually made of bronze and stored in the respective shrines of the deities. Panchaloha (Sanskrit Devanagari: पञ्चलोह; IAST: pañcaloha) (also called Panchaloham - literally, "five metals") is a term for traditional five-metal alloys of sacred significance used for making Hindu temple icons. The tradition started from the Chola era from the 7th century and continues during the modern era. These festival deities are taken out of the shrines in processions during festivals.

=== Village deities ===
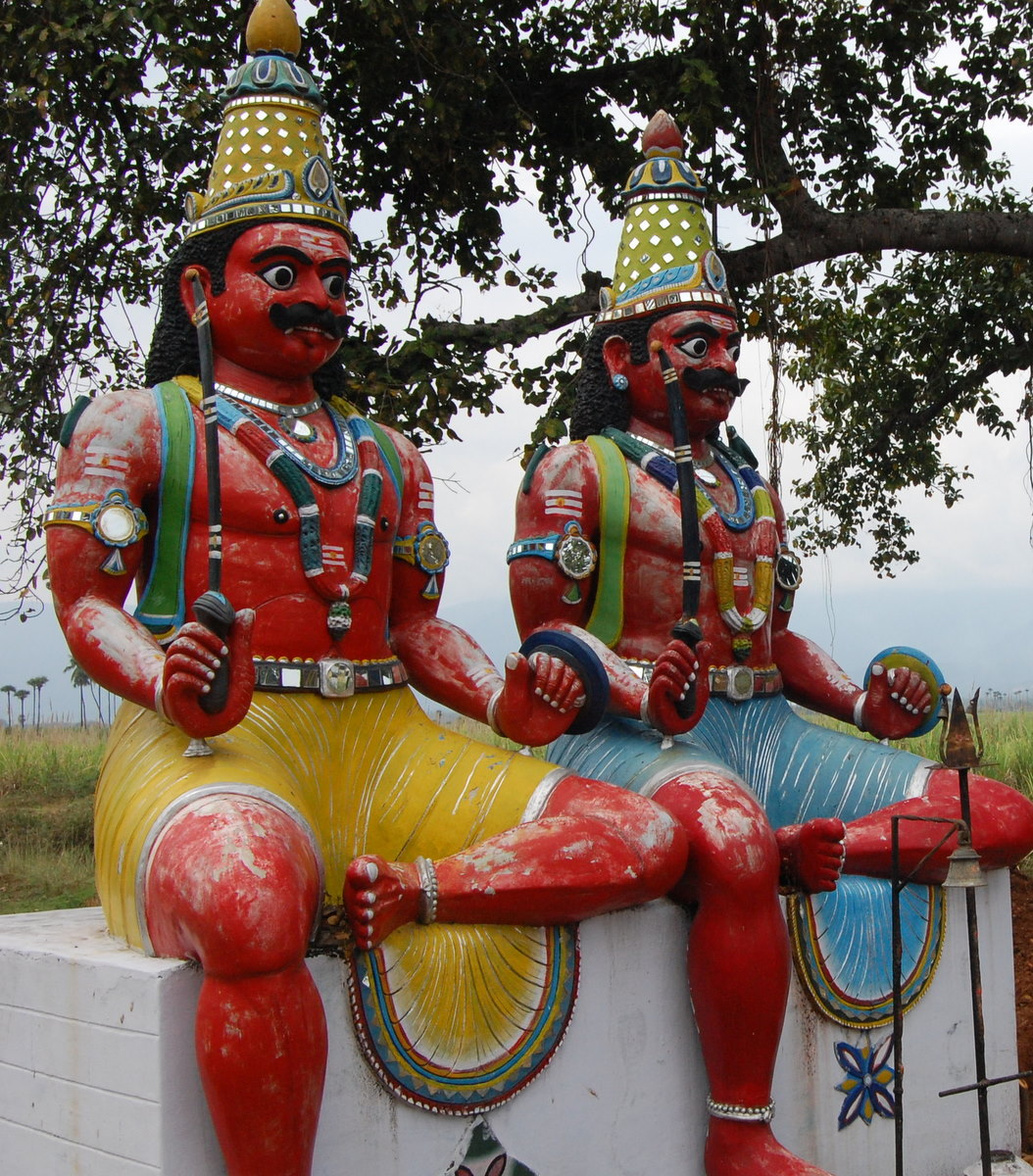
Ayyanar idols near Gobi

The village deities are not part of Shiva temples, but are located outside some of the Shiva temples or outside the village where the Shiva temple is located. Most of the male deities are considered forms of Shiva and are treated as guardian deities.

- Ayyanar (Tamil: ஐயனார்) is worshipped as a guardian deity predominantly in Tamil Nadu and Tamil villages in Sri Lanka. The earliest reference to Aiynar-Shasta includes two or more hero stones to hunting chiefs from the Arcot district in Tamil Nadu. The hero stones are dated to the 3rd century C.E. It reads "Ayanappa; a shrine to Cattan." This is followed by another inscription in Uraiyur near Tiruchirapalli which is dated to the 4th century C.E. Literary references to Aiyanar-Cattan is found in Silappatikaram, a Tamil Buddhist work dated to the 4th to 5th century C.E. From the Chola period (9th century C.E) onwards the popularity of Aiyanar-Shasta became even more pronounced.
- Madurai Veeran (Tamil: மதுரை வீரன், Maturai Vīraņ lit. Warrior of Madurai) is a Tamil folk deity popular in southern Tamil Nadu. His name was derived as a result of his association with the southern city of Madurai as a protector of the city.
- Muneeswarar (Tamil: முனீஸ்வரன்) is a Hindu god. 'Muni' means 'saint' and 'iswara' represents 'Shiva'. He is considered as a form of Shiva, although no scriptural references have been found to validate such claims. He is worshiped as a family deity in most Shaivite families.
- Karuppu Sami (Tamil: கருப்புசாமி) (also called by many other names) is one of the regional Tamil male deities who is popular among the rural social groups of South India, especially Tamil Nadu and small parts of Kerala. He is one of the 21 associate folk-deities of Ayyanar and is hence one of the so-called Kaval Deivams of the Tamils.
- Sudalai Madan or Madan, is a regional Tamil male deity who is popular in South India, particularly Tamil Nadu. He is considered to be the son of Shiva and Parvati. He seems to have originated in some ancestral guardian spirit of the villages or communities in Tamil Nadu, in a similar manner as Ayyanar.
