= Anandamaya kosha =

Concept in Vedantic philosophy

The Anandamaya kosha or "sheath made of bliss" (ananda) is in Vedantic philosophy the most subtle or spiritual of the five levels of embodied self. It has been interpreted differently according to specific schools of Indian (and also Theosophical) thought.

== The Anandamaya kosha in traditional Advaita Vedanta ==
In Advaita Vedanta the Anandamaya kosha is the innermost of the five koshas or "sheaths" that veil the Atman or Supreme Self. Unlike the next three more outer koshas, it constitutes the karana sarira or causal body. It is associated with the state of dreamless sleep and samadhi.

== The Anandamaya kosha in Krsna Consciousness ==
The ānanda-maya stage is explained by A. C. Bhaktivedanta Swami Prabhupada as the "brahma-bhūta" stage in the Bhagavad-gītā. There it is said that in the brahma-bhūta stage of life there is no anxiety and no hankering. This stage begins when one becomes equally disposed toward all living entities, and it then expands to the stage of Kṛṣṇa consciousness, in which one hankers to render service unto the Supreme Personality of Godhead. This hankering for advancement in devotional service is not the same as hankering for sense gratification in material existence. In other words, hankering remains in spiritual life, but it becomes purified. When our senses are purified, they become freed from all material stages, namely anna-maya, prāṇa-maya, mano-maya and vijñāna-maya, and they become situated in the highest stage — ānanda-maya, or blissful life in Kṛṣṇa consciousness.

== The Anandamaya kosha according to Subba Row ==
The Indian Theosophist T. Subba Row correlated the five koshas with Blavatsky's septenary principle. The Anandamaya-kosa (sheath of bliss or Karanopadhi - causal body) is here associated with the Spiritual Soul or Buddhi principle (the sixth of the seven principles)

== The Anandamaya kosha according to Sivaya Subramuniyaswami ==
In the teachings of Satguru Sivaya Subramuniyaswami (Himalayan Academy), the Anandamaya kosha is not a sheath in the same sense as the four outer koshas, but rather constitutes the soul itself, a body of light. As well as being the Causal body and the repository of karma, it is also the Karana chitta, the "causal mind" or superconscious mind, of which Parashakti (or Satchidananda) is the substratum. This Anandamaya kosha evolves through all incarnations until finally merging in the Primal Soul, Parameshvara. It then becomes Sivamayakosha, the body of Siva.

== The Self made of Delight according to Sri Aurobindo ==
Unlike other Vedantic philosophers, Sri Aurobindo does not consider the five selves as koshas, "sheaths", but instead sees them as the evolutionary principles of the Inner or True Divine Self at each plane of existence. The Anandamaya Self is thus the individualised Divine Self that will emerge with the actualisation of the Plane of Ananda, following and even surpassing the Supramental stage of evolution.
