= Vijnanamaya kosha =

Vigyanamaya kosha is one of the five koshas that cover Atman. Vigyanamaya kosha literally means a shell that is composed of wisdom (vijnana) or intellect. It is the fourth covering of Atma. It is also the first layer of the causal mind located in the Vishudda chakra, the Ajna chakra and the Sahasrara chakra. Metaphysically, it is considered the first embodiment of light.

== The Vigyananamaya kosha according to Swami Sivananda ==
The Vigyananamaya Kosha consists of the intellect in conjunction with the five organs of knowledge or the Jnana-Indriyas. During sleep it gets involution or Laya along with Chidabhasa or the reflection of Pure Consciousness. During waking state it is the doer. It is an effect like a jar and is inanimate. It shines in borrowed feathers. It borrows its light temporarily from its source, just as the moon borrows its light from the sun. It is not the eternal Self.
