= Mahat-tattva =

Concept in Hindu philosophy

- Samkhya: Kapila
- Yoga: Patanjali
- Vaisheshika: Kaṇāda, Prashastapada
- Secular: Valluvar

Mahat-tattva (Sanskrit: महत्तत्त्व, romanized: Mahattattva) or mahat is a concept in the Samkhya philosophy of Hinduism. It is the first evolute of Prakriti, the causeless cause of the world, that is generated after Prakriti begins to evolve when its equilibrium is disturbed, which causes expansion of material energy and matter. In the process of evolution, after mahat emanates, egoity (ahamkara), mind (manas), the five sense capacities, the five action capacities, the five subtle elements, and the five gross elements evolve. These are the 22 other elements that constitute the basic metaphysics of Samkhya.

== Etymology ==
The Sanskrit terms mahat means "great", and tattva may be translated as "element".

== Description ==
In Samkhya philosophy, the creation process of the Universe starts when Purusha engages with Prakriti. Prakriti is the first principal of creation and consists of three guṇas (qualities) – sattva, rajas, and tamas – which are dormant until stirred into activity by Purusha. This results in the first evolute, mahat. Ahamkara is the "I-ness" and is created from mahat. Ahamkara further gives rise to manas (mind), five jnanendriyas (five sense capacities), five karmendriyas, five tanmatras (subtle elements), and five bhutas (gross elements). These are the 22 other elements that constitute the basic metaphysics of Samkhya. These elements are divided into two groups: psychic and physical. The psychic elements not only play psychological roles, but also have cosmic functions. Mahat is an example of such an element. In its cosmic form, it is the cause of the 22 elements that evolve from it; in its cognitive form, it is termed buddhi, or intellect. Each self is in contact with an intellect, buddhi, that stores the mental imprints that the self has gained on account of its experiences in the world. Buddhi has eight forms: virtue (dharma) and vice (adharma), knowledge (jñāna) and ignorance (ajñana), non-attachment (vairāgya) and attachment (rāga), and power (aiśvarya) and absence of power (anaiśvarya).

== Literature ==
=== Puranas ===
In Bhagavata Purana Canto 3, Chapter 5, Verse 27, mahat is described as:

tato ‘bhavan mahat-tattvam

avyaktāt kāla-coditāt

vijñānātmātma-deha-sthaṁ

viśvaṁ vyañjaṁs tamo-nudaḥ

And translated by Swami Prabhupada as:

Thereafter, influenced by the interactions of eternal time, the supreme sum total of matter called the mahat-tattva became manifested, and in this mahat-tattva the unalloyed goodness, the Supreme Lord, sowed the seeds of universal manifestation out of His own body.
