= Buddhi =

Sanskrit term for intellect

Buddhi (Sanskrit: बुद्धि) refers to the intellectual faculty in Indian philosophy, the power to "form and retain concepts, reason, discern, judge, comprehend, understand," representing both a persisting faculty of discernment and the specific mental constructs it produces.

== Etymology ==
Buddhi (Sanskrit: बुद्धि) is a feminine Sanskrit noun derived from the Vedic Sanskrit root budh (बुध् ), "to wake, be awake, observe, heed, attend, learn, become aware of, to know, be conscious again". Monier Williams defines buddhi as the power to "form, retain concepts; intelligence, reason, intellect, mind", the intellectual faculty and the ability to "discern, judge, comprehend, understand" something. The term appears extensively in the Rigveda and other Vedic literature. The same root is the basis for the more familiar masculine form Buddha and the abstract noun bodhi.

Matilal notes that there are two forms of buddhi, namely vidya, correct knowledge, and avidya, false knowledge or misapprehension.

As reflected in the notion of awakening (bodhi), the term's abstract usage also denotes the cognitive transition from muddled or unclear knowledge to better or more useful knowledge, producing refined judgements and decisions. This semantic profile enabled buddhi to emerge as the primary designation for the highest mental faculty within the Sāṃkhya philosophical system.

In many philosophical systems, buddhi is distinguished from manas (मनस्), the sensory mind or "lower mind," and ahaṃkāra (अहंंकाऱ), the "ego, I-sense in egotism." Within this cognitive hierarchy, the senses, mind, intellect, and witnessing consciousness operate sequentially—the senses transmit physical impressions from the outside world to the "higher" faculties, after which the mind and intellect operate on these cognitions in their respective ways.

== Bhagavad Gita ==
In Bhagavad Gita Chapter 18, Krishna mentions influences of two gunas, rajas and tamas, on buddhi. In verse 18.31, Krishna tells Arjuna that when buddhi is influenced by rajas, the person cannot clearly distinguish between dharma (right action) and adharma (wrong action). Verse 18.32 explains that when buddhi is influenced by tamas, the person may confuse dharma with adharma and has distorted understanding of all subjects.

== Sānkhya-Yoga ==
In Sāṃkhya and Yoga philosophy, both the sensory mind (manas) and the ego (ahaṃkāra) are material evolutes of nature (mūlaprakṛti) that manifest through the interaction of the three gunas (गुण) under the misapprehension of puruṣa (पुरूष) (the consciousness-essence of the jivatman). Discriminative in nature (बुद्धि निश्चयात्मिका चित्त-वृत्ति), buddhi is that which is able to discern truth (satya) from falsehood and thereby to make wisdom possible.

According to the Sānkhya-Yoga view, buddhi is in essence unconscious, and as such, cannot be an object of its own consciousness. This means that it can neither apprehend an object nor manifest itself.

In the Yoga Sutra, it is explained that the buddhi cannot illuminate itself, since it itself is the object of sight, "na tat svabhāsam draśyatvāt" ("That is not self-luminous, because it is perceptible").

In the Samkhyakarika, buddhi, originally referred to as mahat, is the fundamental entity that emerges during Prakrti's cosmic self-transformation. It has the sense of knowledge, and is synonymous with words like thought, idea, wisdom, and insight. Buddhi is characterized by its function as judgment, as it not only identifies the nature of things but also determines the best course of action. From buddhi arises ahamkara, the "I-maker", which begins the cosmic differentiation, producing inner sensation (indriya) through its transformed (sattvika) aspect and external perceptions through its elemental (tamasika) aspect, laying the foundation for subjectivity, objectivity, and self-awareness.

== See also ==
- Citta
- Enlightenment in Buddhism
- Namarupa
- Nous
- Three Bodies Doctrine
- Wisdom

== Sources ==
- Matilal, Bimal Krishna (1980). "Ignorance or Misconception? A Note on Avidyā in Buddhism". Buddhist Studies in Honour of Walpola Rahula. London: Fraser. pp. 162, 163.
