= Manas (early Buddhism) =

Concept of the mind in early Buddhism

Manas (Pali: मनस्) is one of three overlapping terms used in the nikayas to refer to the mind, the others being citta and viññāṇa.

== Comparison with citta and viññāṇa ==
Manas, citta, and viññāṇa are each sometimes used in the generic and non-technical sense of "mind" in general, and the three are sometimes used in sequence to refer to one's mental processes as a whole. Their primary uses are, however, distinct. In the distinction of Abhidhamma Pitaka of Theravada Buddhism, mana or mano is akin to the notion of mind as a whole, whereas a citta is each of the instant steps or processes of mind, and viññāṇa is one of the several forms of citta, also being a step of a vithi or mental procedure, which is an orderly sequence of citta.

== Relationship with thinking and volition ==
Manas often indicates the general thinking faculty. Thinking is closely associated with volitions, because mental activity is one of the ways that volitions manifest themselves: "Having willed, one acts through body, speech, and thoughts." Furthermore, willing is described in terms of deliberate thinking.

Undeliberate thought is often an expression of latent tendencies (anusaya), which are conditioned by the volitional nexus of the past.

The term is not used in the description of the cognitive process in the early texts, aside from the preliminary role of manodhātu. The discursive activities of the cognitive process are rather the function of saññā, together with "reasoning" and "making manifold". This suggests that the "thinking" done by manas is more closely linked to volition than to the discursive processes associated with apperception. Manas is mainly the mental activity which follows from volitions, whether immediately, or separated by time and caused by the activation of a latent tendency.
