= Upadhi =

Upādhi (Sanskrit: उपाधि ) is a term in Hindu philosophy meaning "imposition" or "limitation". In Hindu logic, an upādhi is the condition which accompanies the major term and must be supplied to limit the too general middle term. For instance, "the mountain has smoke because it has fire" rests on the false premise that all fire is accompanied by smoke. To restrict the too general middle term here, 'damp fuel' should be added as the condition of smoky fire.

It can also be viewed as a disguise or vehicle for true reality, both defining something and limiting it. For example, the body of a man or animal is the upādhi of its true self. Another example is that the true self, Brahman (Sanskrit: ब्रह्म ) is hidden in a living being, jiva (Sanskrit: जीव ) by the upādhi of the mind, Antahkarana (Sanskrit: अंतःकरण ) and the creator God, Īshvara (Sanskrit: ईश्वर ) by the upādhi of Māyā (Sanskrit: माया ) an appearance which is not what it seems. Upādhi is the condition of body and mind obscuring the true self which Indian schools of thought seek to remove for the attainment of moksha, realisation of the true self.

Comans says the word upādhi is the most important technical expression in Advaita Vedanta. He mentions that upādhi refers to a thing that apparently conditions something else by transferring its properties to that other thing on account of the proximity between them. The standard illustration is that of a red flower which transfers its property of redness to a clear crystal due to their proximity. In this case the red flower is the upādhi of the crystal.

In his commentary on the Bṛhadāraṇyaka Upaniṣhad 3.8.12, Śaṅkara raises the important question as to what is the difference between Brahman, God (Īśvara), and the individual self (jīva) and he answers the question by saying that these distinctions are made only on the basis of limiting adjuncts (upādhi), which prevents reality. There is no difference between them.
