= Kosha =

Concept of sheath in Hinduism

A kosha (also kosa; Sanskrit कोश, IAST: kośa), usually rendered "sheath", is a covering of Atman, or Self according to Vedantic philosophy. The five sheaths, summarised with the term Panchakosha, are described in the Taittiriya Upanishad (2.1-5), and they are often visualised as the layers of an onion. From gross to fine they are:

1. Annamaya kosha, "food" sheath (Anna), the physical body;
2. Pranamaya kosha, "energy" sheath (Prana), the vital principle;
3. Manomaya kosha "mind" sheath (Manas), the mind and the five senses;
4. Vijñānamaya kosha, "discernment" or "Knowledge" sheath (Vigynana)
5. Anandamaya kosha, "bliss" sheath (Ananda)

== Origins ==
The five sheaths summarised with the term Panchakosha are described in the Taittiriya Upanishad (2.1-5).

Panchakoshas are divided in three bodies:

- The gross body sthula sarira - made up of physical matter. This body consists of Annamaya kosha.
- the subtle body suksma sarira - This body consists of Pranamaya Kosha, Manomaya Kosha and Vijnanamaya Kosha.
- the causal body karana sarira - This body consists of Anandamaya Kosha.

The atman is behind the Panchakoshas. According to Vedanta the wise person, being aware of the subtle influences of the five elements within each kosha, ever discerns the Self amidst appearances.

== The five sheaths ==
=== Annamaya kosha ===
This is the sheath of the physical (body) self, the grossest of the five koshas, named from the fact that it is nourished by food. Living through this layer humans identify themselves with a mass of skin, flesh, fat, bones, and feces, while the human of discrimination knows oneself, the only reality that there is, as distinct from the body. The physical body is formed of the essence of food. Birth and death are the attributes of the Annamaya kosha.

Anna means matter, annam literally means food; Taittiriya Upanishad calls food the medicament of all. The gross body which is matter-born and matter sustained and transient and subject to perception is the Annamayakosha whose origin is food eaten by parents. It is visible, dependent and impure. It is not the atman because it did not exist before its origination and ceases to exist once it is destroyed. It is subject to origination and destruction every moment. It is the anatman because it is not in the beginning and at the end, is non-existent also in the present. It does not know itself. The deluded mind that does not inquire considers his atman to be this body or kosha. Such a person cannot enjoy bliss.

=== Pranamaya kosha ===
Pranamaya means composed of prana, the vital principle, the force that vitalizes and holds together the body and the mind. It pervades the whole organism, its one physical manifestation is the breath. As long as this vital principle exists in the organisms, life continues. Coupled with the five organs of action it forms the vital sheath. In the Vivekachudamani it is a modification of vayu or air, it enters into and comes out of the body.

Pranamayakosha, separate from and subtler than Annamayakosha, pertains to the Sukshma sarira, it is the sheath of the vital airs completely enclosing and filling the Annamayakosha. The Prana in combination with the five organs of action constitutes the Pranamayakosha. The Annamayakosha is an effect of the Pranamayakosha. The Annamayakosha gets life by the Prana entering into it and engages in all kinds of action. Prana is the life of beings and the Universal life. Whatever happens in the Annamayakosha is wrongly identified as belonging to the atman by reason of its being pervaded by the Pranamayakosha which is effect of Vayu, and totally unaware and dependent.

=== Manomaya kosha ===
Manomaya means composed of manas or mind. The mind, along with the five sensory organs, is said to constitute the manomaya kosa. The manomaya kosa, or "mind-sheath" is said more truly to approximate to personhood than annamaya kosa and pranamaya kosha. It is the cause of diversity, of I and mine. Adi Shankara links it to clouds that are brought in by the wind and again driven away by the same agency. Similarly, man's bondage is caused by the mind, and liberation, too, is caused by that alone.

Manomayakosha belongs to the Suksma sarira. It is the "self" having Pranamayakosha as its body. The organs of knowledge and the mind form this kosha which is the cause of the sense of the "I" and of the "mine" and of the varying conceptions. It creates difference of names etc., because organs of knowledge are dependent on and determined by the mind which is of the nature of determination and doubt. It is powerful because bondage and liberation depend on the mind which producing attachment binds a person and which by creating aversion for them liberates them from that self-made bondage. It pervades the Pranamayakosha. It is the sacrificial fire, the five organs are the priests who pour into this fire the oblations of sense-objects, which fire fuelled by various vasanas burns out the world created and expanded by the mind that when fouled by rajas ("projection") and tamas ("concealment") superimposes the samsara but when free of rajas and tamas can bring about the state of being established in Brahman.

=== Vijñānamaya kosha ===
Vijñānamaya means composed of vijñāna, or intellect, the faculty which discriminates, determines or wills. Chattampi Swamikal defines vijñānamaya as the combination of intellect and the five sense organs. It is the sheath composed of more intellection, associated with the organs of perception. Sankara holds that the buddhi, with its modifications and the organs of knowledge, form the cause of man's transmigration. This knowledge sheath, which seems to be followed by a reflection of the power of the cit, is a modification of prakrti. It is endowed with the function of knowledge and identifies itself with the body, organs etc.

Vijnanamaya kosha also belongs to the Suksma sarira and pervades the Manomayakosha that pervades the Pranamayakosha which pervades the Annamayakosha. Buddhi with its organs of knowledge and its actions having the characteristics of an agent is the Vigyanakosha, the cause of samsara. It has the power of reflection of the chaitanya which it accompanies as a modification of Prakrti (avidya) and characterised by knowledge and action and always identified with the body, organs etc. This kosha is endowed with jnana and to it belong the waking and dream states and the experiences of joy and sorrow. Being very luminous in close proximity of the Paramatman deluded by which upadhi it is subject to samsara, this atman which is compacted of vigyanana and shining in the heart near the pranas being immutable becomes a doer and enjoyer in the midst of the upadhis. Its "jivabhava-existential-character" i.e. Jivahood, persists so long as there is delusion as it is born of mithyajnana. Though avidya is beginningless it is not eternal.

=== Anandamaya kosha ===
Anandamaya means composed of ananda, or bliss; it is the subtlest of the five koshas. In the Upanishads the sheath is known also as the causal body. In deep sleep, when the mind and senses cease functioning, it still stands between the finite world and the self. Anandamaya, or that which is composed of supreme bliss, is regarded as the innermost of all. The bliss sheath normally has its fullest play during deep sleep: while in the dreaming and wakeful states, it has only a partial manifestation. The blissful sheath (anandamaya kosha) is a reflection of the Atman which is truth, beauty, bliss absolute.

Anandamaya kosha is the last layer and it is the closest layer to the Atman. It is a modification of avidya and appears as a reflection of the atman compacted of absolute bliss. It is fully manifested in the dreamless deep sleep. It is not the atman because it is connected with upadhis ("limitations") and a modification of Prakrti as an effect of good deeds.

== Significance ==
Ātman can be identified only by negation of the anatman. The Panchkoshas are anatman that hide the atman, these koshas or sheaths are required to be systematically removed. Their removal brings to fore a void which void is also required to be removed. After removal of the five sheaths and the resultant void through the process of negation, what remains is the Atman; and then the non-existence of all the modifications beginning with the ahamkara is self-witnessed, the self that witnesses is itself the supreme Self. These five sheaths envelop the atman or "Self".

The Vedanta conceives the expression of the gross universe possible by traversing through all these stages of emanation from the cloud of Maya covering the face of Brahman to Sthula bhutas or gross matter with all its multifarious aspect including gross energy. Badarayana, drawing attention to Pāṇini’s grammar (V.iv.21), explains that the suffix mayat as in Annamaya (made of food), Pranamaya (made of vital air) etc., besides conveying the meaning "made of" has also the sense of abundance and plenitude as well for which reason it is repeatedly said - Brahman is the Blissful (Anandamaya) Self.

== See also ==
- Advaita Vedanta
- Chakra
- Guna
- Kundalini
- Mandukya Upanishad
- Three bodies

== Sources ==
- Mallinson, James; Singleton, Mark (2017). Roots of Yoga. Penguin Books. ISBN 978-0-241-25304-5. OCLC 928480104.
