= Citta =

Buddhist psychological construct

Translations of Mind
- English: mind, spirit, heart
- Sanskrit: चित्त
- Pali: 𑀘𑀺𑀢𑁆𑀢 citta
- Burmese: စိတ်
- Chinese: 心
- Japanese: 心
- Thai: จิต
- Vietnamese: tâm, tâm vương, tâm bản thể

Citta (Pali and Sanskrit: चित्त, or in Prakrit script 𑀘𑀺𑀢𑁆𑀢, pronounced chitta [t͡ɕit̚.tɐ́]^{(key)}) is one of three overlapping terms used in the Nikaya to refer to the mind, the others being manas and viññāṇa. Each is sometimes used in the generic and non-technical sense of "mind" in general, and the three are sometimes used in sequence to refer to one's mental processes as a whole. However, their primary uses are distinct.

== Usage ==
=== In the Suttas ===
The Pali–English Dictionary translates citta as heart or heart-mind, emphasizing it as more the passionate side of the mind, as opposed to manas as the intellect that grasps mental objects (dhamma). Citta is the object of meditation in the third part of Satipatthana, also called Four Foundations of Mindfulness.

Citta primarily represents one's mindset, or state of mind. It is the term used to refer to the quality of mental processes as a whole. Citta is classified as a khandha (or skandha), specifically as one of three types of saṅkhārā (kāyasaṅkhāro, vacīsaṅkhāro, cittasaṅkhāro; body, speech, mind) and is included in descriptions of the dependent origination (paticcasamuppada) formula in several suttas of the Pali Canon's Majjhima Nikāya and Saṃyutta Nikāya. In Indian Psychology, citta is the seat and organ of thought.

The complex causal nexus of volitions (or intentions) that one experiences continuously conditions one's thoughts, speech, and actions. At any given time, one's state of mind reflects that complex; thus, the causal origin of actions, speech, and thoughts is sometimes associated with the state of mind in a manner of speaking. This does not mean that it is that causal nexus; it is better understood as an abstract reflection. One's mindset can be out of tune with one's desires or aspirations. In that it reflects the volitions, the citta is said to go off with its own will if not properly controlled. It may lead a person astray or, if properly controlled, directed and integrated, ennobling one. One may "make citta turn according to" his wishes most effectively by developing skill in meditative concentration, which brings mental calm and clarity. An individual undergoes many different states of mind; M.II.27 asks: "Which citta? for citta is manifold, various, and diverse." Generally speaking, a person will operate with a collection of changing mindsets, and some will occur regularly. While these mindsets determine the personality, they do not control themselves but fluctuate and alternate. There is thus the need for the meditative integration of personality to provide a greater, more wholesome consistency.

Regarding volitions, there is a similarity between viññāna and citta; they are both associated with the qualitative condition of a human being. Viññāna provides awareness and continuity by which one knows one's moral condition, and citta is an abstraction representing that condition. Citta is closely related to volitions; this connection is also etymological, as citta comes from the same verbal root in Pali as the active terms meaning "to will". Citta also reflects one's cognitive condition/progress.

Citta as a mindset can become "contracted" (i.e. unworkable), "distracted", "grown great", "composed", or the opposite of such qualities (M.I.59). It can be dominated by a certain emotion, to be "terrified", "astonished", or "tranquil." It can be "taken hold of" by pleasant or unpleasant impressions (M.I.423). A host of negative emotionally charged states can pertain to it, or it may be free of such states, so it is vital to develop or purify it: "For a long time this citta has been defiled by attachment, hatred, and delusion. By defilement of citta, beings are defiled; by purity of citta, beings are purified" (S.III.152).

Attaining a purified citta corresponds to attaining liberating insight. This indicates that a liberated state of mind reflects no ignorance or defilements. As these represent bondage, their absence is described in terms of freedom.

=== In the Abhidhamma ===
In the Theravāda Abhidhamma, citta is one of the four paramattha dhammas. There are 89 (or 121) types of citta, classified by ethical quality (jāti), plane, and function. Each citta arises with accompanying cetasikas and experiences one object through one of the six doors.See Nina van Gorkom’s Abhidhamma in Daily Life.

== See also ==
- Chit (consciousness)
- Cittaviveka (Pali: 'discerning mind') Chithurst Buddhist Monastery
- Luminous mind
- Mental factors (Buddhism)
- Vijñāna
- Yogachara
