= Ahamkara =

Sanskrit term in Indian philosophy

Ahaṃkara (Sanskrit: अहंकार; Romanized: Ahaṁkāra), meaning "I-making," is a Sanskrit term in Hindu philosophy referring to the construction of a self-concept, or the false identification of the self (puruṣa, ātman) with impermanent entities such as the body, mind, or material objects. It evolves from mahat-tattva, and is one of the four functions of the antaḥkaraṇa (functions of the mind).

== Ahamkara in the Bhagavad Gita ==
In the Bhagavad Gita, ahamkara is presented as the ego, or the false identification of the self (atman) with material nature, which obstructs spiritual liberation (moksha). In 3.27, Krishna warns that actions driven by ahamkara—believing “I am the doer”—bind the soul to karma: “All actions are performed by the gunas of nature, but one deluded by ahamkara thinks, ‘I am the doer.’" Easwaran notes that ahamkara fuels desires that obscure the true self, a theme evident in Krishna’s call for humility in 13.8–12, where virtues like “absence of pride” and “humility” are praised as paths to wisdom. In 18.17, Krishna describes the liberated state: “One who is free from the notion of ahamkara and whose intellect is unattached neither kills nor is bound by actions".

== Philosophical implications ==
Vedic philosophy also teaches that when one's mind is in a state of Ahaṁkāra, one is in a state of subjective illusion where the psyche is bound to the concept of one's self with an external thing. This thing can be tangible and material, or it can be a concept, such as the concept of the fight for peace. Here, the ego is involved in constructing the illusion.

Examples of Ahaṃkāra in action:

Consider how an otherwise sensible young man might feel if his new sports car was a reflection of his true self. It would encourage him to race against another person recklessly. Similarly, consider how someone who believed in the fight for peace and ordinarily behaved in a non-violent manner fought against someone who threatened or challenged their notions of peace.

In both cases, the mind has averred a state of illusion, appearing real to the person who blurs the line between subjectivity and reality. This illusory state often causes people to do things that can be categorized as "out of character" for them.

== Ahaṁkāra and Spiritual Development ==
- Ahaṁkāra is the instrument of Ahaṃ (the Spirit), the principle of individuation, acting as an independent conscious entity within the impure reality which does not have consciousness of its own.
- Ahaṁkāra is (actually soul/ego-soul) the instrument of the spirit (made by thought-material—dark energy' and 'dark material') for the individual development of the ego-soul, like DEHA (material-body/mold), which is the instrument for solitary evolution of the ego-soul/mind.
- It is a receptacle of Cit śakti, its consciousness, a diminutive spark from Cit, the universal consciousness.
- It manifests itself by assuming authorship of all the actions of buddhi, manas, the senses, and organs of action.
- It is believed to exist in the sphere of duality—in a state of identification with the physical body, its needs and desires.
- It is related to Vak tattva, one of the 36 tattvas in Vedic and Hindu philosophy.
- In Ahaṁkāra, a state of rajas guṇa (agitation) predominates. This is because it identifies only with a small part of the creation (the body) and rejects everything else as "not me"; it becomes subject to a series of afflictions such as pride, egoism, competitiveness, hate, and jealousy.

Though Ahaṁkāra is generally a state of illusion, Vak tattva (one of the 36 tattvas) can appear when one does not succumb to it. In Vak tattva, the individual’s will, determination, and sense of morality come into play, which is the first step on the path to enlightenment. However, a person who is sufficiently harmonious but has a powerful Ahaṁkāra (personality) is thought to be impossible to exert the level of effort necessary to accede to a higher spiritual level.

=== In Samkhya ===
According to evolutionary chain described in Samkhya, the evolution process begins with Mahattattva, followed first by buddhi, and then ahaṁkāra. The position of Ahaṁkāra and buddhi are sometimes presented in a reversed order because, as the principle of "I-ness", the Ahaṁkāra is allowed control over the manas (sensorial mind) and buddhi (superior intellect, intuition). Yet, buddhi is a superior tattva, and Ahaṁkāra is thus only able to be in a superior position to buddhi from a functional point of view. From an absolute point of view, Ahaṁkāra is created by buddhi and thus subordinate to it.

== See also ==
- Antahkarana (Inner Cause)
- Chod (To Sever)
- Cognitive dissonance
- Anatta
- Ego death
- Egolessness
- Humility
- Mindstream
- Shadripu
- Svabhava
- Ramana Maharshi
- I Am a Strange Loop
- Self-concept

Jainism

- Ahankar (Pride)

Sikhism

- Hankaar
