= List of Maithil Brahmins =

The exclusive clans of Brahmins belonging to Mithila region of the Indian Subcontinent are known as Maithil Brahmins.

== Civil service ==
- Lakshmi Kant Jha (1913–1988), Governor of the Reserve Bank of India
- Aditya Nath Jha - former civil servant and recipient of Padma Bhushan.

== Entertainment ==
- Udit Narayan Jha (born 1955), Bollywood playback singer.
- Maithili Thakur (born 2000), Indian classical singer and folk music star.
- Manish Jha - Indian film writer and director, known for the films Matrubhoomi and Anwar.
- Prakash Jha - A Bollywood film director and producer.

== Historical characters & fighters ==
- Chandeshvar Thakur - Mithila Brahmin General who conquered parts of Nepal and repulsed many Islamic Tughlaq Generals and their attacks in the 14th Century C.E. He was ancestor of Vidyapati Thakur himself.
- Kameshwar Thakur - The first king of the Oiniwar dynasty in Mithila.
- Bhavasimha - King of the Oiniwar dynasty.
- Shiva Simha Singh - Mithila Brahmin King from the 14th Century C.E who defeated Jalaluddin Muhammad Shah, the Sultan of Bengal and was also involved in further east when he helped Raja Ganesha in his battle against Jaunpur Sultan, Ibrahim Shah Sharqi in the Jaunpur-Bengal conflict. He's noted for freeing Mithila and Northern-Eastern India from Islamic rule.
- Lakhimadevi - Maharani of Mithila Kingdom during the Oiniwar Dynasty. She was the scholarly wife of the King Shivasimha.
- Vishwasa Devi - Maharani of Mithila Kingdom during the Oiniwar Dynasty. She established her capital at Bisaul which was named after her name.
- Maharaja Narendra Singh - Mithila Brahmin King who's famous for making Mithilanchal independent with his war against one of the biggest Mughal fractions, the Bengal Subah in the Battle of Kandarpi Ghat, 1753 C.E (18th Century).
- Maharaja Mahesh Thakur - Founder of Raj Darbhanga. Both a King and an Astrologer.
- Maharaja Kameshwar Singh Bahadur - Last Maithil Brahmin King of Mithila who's known for his philanthropist works & architecture.
- Maharani Kamasundari Devi, last queen of Raj Darbhanga in Mithila.
- Kameshwari Devi was a freedom fighter from the Benipatti Sub-Division of Madhubani District. She was also known as Lal Kaki and Badka Ma. Her house was burnt down by the British Colonial Rulers during the Quit India movement. She was awarded the freedom fighter pension and first class railway pass by the Government of India.
- Maharaj Devsimha - The Father of Shiva Simha Singh, Describing his greatness Vidyapati writes that when Devsimha died, Indra, the king of heaven, offered him half of his throne. Only then were the Sultans of Bengal and Jaunpur were able to sleep peacefully because the independent attitude and activities of Dev Singh and his family had deprived both Sultans of their sleep.
- Bhairava Simha - successor of King Dhirasimha. He declared the kingdom of Mithila as Independent Sovereign State and issued silver coins.
- Laxman Jha - a freedom fighter for the independence of India and an activist of the Mithila state movement.

== Poets and scholars ==
- Mandana Mishra - Philosopher and scholar of Mimansa Shas a, author of Brahmasiddhi.
- Udyanacharya - 10th century's Indian philosopher. An eminent Naiyayika and the author of the text Nyayakusumanjali.
- Vidyapati - Maithili poet and a Sanskrit writer
- Gangesha - 12th-century Indian mathematician and philosopher
- Vardhamana Upadhyaya - Philosopher
- Vachaspati Mishra - Philosopher
- Ayachi Mishra - Philosopher and scholar of Nyaya Shastra
- Sankara Mishra - Philosopher and author of Upaskara commentary text on Vaisheshika Sutra.
- Pakshadhara Mishra - 15th century's Indian philosopher of the Nyaya school of the Indian philosophy. An eminent Naiyayika.
- Gonu Jha - Iconic court jester in Mithila
- Hemangada Thakura - 16th century astronomer and author of the text Grahan Mala.
- Ganganath Jha - Sanskrit scholar, former vice-chancellor of the Allahabad University and recipient of Dhauta Samman.
- Amarnath Jha - Sanskrit scholar, former vice-chancellor of the Allahabad University.
- Chanda Jha - Maithili poet and author of the Maithili Bhasa Ramayana.
- Shankaracharya Swami Nishchalananda Saraswati - The present Shankaracharya of the Govardhan Peeth, Puri.

== Politicians ==
- Lalit Narayan Mishra – Former Indian Rail Minister
- Gopal Jee Thakur – Member of Parliament for Darbhanga Loksabha Constituency
- Jagannath Mishra former chief minister of Bihar.
- Pandit Binodanand Jha former chief minister of Bihar.
- Bhagwat Jha Azad former chief minister of Bihar.
- Devesh Chandra Thakur Member of Parliament for Sitamarhi Loksabha .
- Yogeshwar Jha - former state minister of education in the Government of Bihar.
- Bedanand Jha former cabinet minister and chairman of rajyasabha, Nepal.
- Anil Kumar Jha Minister of Industry, Commerce and Supplies, Nepal.
- Parmanand Jha First vice president of Nepal.
- Dipendra Jha Chief Attorney General of the Madhesh Province.
- Aditya Nath Jha Secretary as the first director of the National Academy of Administration, Mussorie, Secretary to the Government of India and first Lieutenant Governor of Delhi.
- Manoj Kumar Jha - Indian politician, member of Rajya Sabha in Indian Parliament and a member of Rashtriya Janata Dal.
- Sanjay Kumar Jha - Rahya Shabha MP cum executive president of JDU party.

== Medical field ==
- Ashish Jha - American general internist physician
