= Tanmatras =

Hindu philosophical concept

Tanmatras (Sanskrit: तन्मात्र = tanmātra) are rudimentary, undifferentiated, subtle elements from which gross elements are produced. There are five sense perceptions – hearing, touch, sight, taste and smell – and there are five tanmatras corresponding to those five sense perceptions and the five sense-organs. The tanmatras combine and re-combine in different ways to produce the gross elements – ether, air, fire, water, and earth – which make up the gross universe perceived by the senses.

== Definition ==
Tanmatras are five subtle elements corresponding to sound, touch, sight or color, taste, and smell, from which gross elements arise. The five gross elements are called the mahabhutas: ether, air, fire, water, and earth. The senses come into contact with the objects and carry impressions of them to the manas (mind), which receives and arranges them into precepts.

== Theories of evolution ==
=== Upanishads ===
Sankara and Ramanuja, theological commentators on the Upanishads, have understood the elements as meaning deities and not the elements proper. The Upanishads hold the impossibility of the generation of anything from out of nothingness, or not-being, explain the genesis from life-force or cosmic-force, but finally aver that all creation is only an illusion or appearance. The first-created rayi and prana, mentioned by the philosopher Pippalada, refer to matter and spirit. That Brahman is the non-dual reality can only be known by the process of differentiation from the five elements, differentiation is necessary to separate Brahman from the elements that make up the perceived world. As creation means the appearance of names and forms, names and forms cannot exist before creation. Also, the difference between objects of the same class can have no reference to sat, for nothing else exists; and to speak of difference from a thing which does not exist conveys no meaning. Vidyaranya explains, in Panchadasi III.27, that:

अक्षाणां विषयस्तवीदृक्परोक्षस्तादृगुच्यते
विषयी नाक्षविषयीः स्वत्वान्नास्य परोक्षता

(an object which the senses can perceive can be compared,
but an object which is beyond perception can only be imagined,
and the object which is the subject of perception cannot be an object of the senses.)

=== Samkhya ===
The Samkhya school holds that the five tanmatras are the essential, primordial causes of the five gross elements of physical manifestation: akasha (ether), vayu (air), agni or taijasa (fire), ap (water), and prithvi (earth), in the order of their creation. These five elements, the bhutas, combine without limit to form all material forms in space and time, including living bodies. This is in accordance with the Vedic theory of creation.

The early Samkhya teacher Pancasikha calls the ultimate truth avyakta (the unmanifest) in the state of purusha, and that consciousness is due to the conglomeration of the mind-body complex and the element of cetas. They are independent of one another, are not the self. For Pancasikha, the renunciation of the perceived and imperceptible phenomena leads to moksha (liberation).

Prakrti (nature, or "the ultimate basis of the empirical universe") consists of three guṇas (aspects or qualities): sattva (potential consciousness), rajas (activity), and tamas (restraint). The guṇas change, but they can also be in a state of samyavastha (equilibrium), where no action results. Purusha and prakrti are the two non-evolutes, eternal and unchanging. The nearness of purusha disturbs prakrti, alters the equilibrium of the three gunas – sattva (illumination), rajas (stimulation and dynamism) and tamas (indifference, heaviness, and inaction) – whose combination of attributes determines the nature of all derivative principles enumerated by the Samkhya system, triggers the causal chains, and facilitates evolution. Primordial materiality does not manifest itself; it is manifested through the evolutes.

According to Samkhya, under the influence of purusha (pure consciousness), prakrti first evolves to produce mahat (greatness, eminence) or buddhi (definite understanding, or intelligence), then ahamkara (ego). From ahamkara's sattva aspect, arises manas (the mind), the five organs of perception and the five of action. From ahamkara's tamas aspect, arise the tanmatras (five subtle elements). From the tanmatras arise the five gross, or substantial, elements, under the influence of tamas. The rajas aspect here helps with evolution under the influence of both other aspects.

Vijnanabhiksu holds that both the separation of ahamkara and the evolution of tanmatras take place in mahat. The state in which the tamas succeeds in overcoming the sattva aspect preponderant in buddhi is called bhutadi. Bhutadi and rajas generate the tanmatras, the immediate causes of the gross elements.

From the union of these two non-evolutes evolves buddhi (knowing), from buddhi evolves ahamkara (willing), from ahamkara evolves manas (feeling), jnanenriyas (five sense-capacities), karmendriyas (five action-capacities), and tanmatras (five subtle elements), from which evolve the mahābhūta's (five gross elements).

=== Yoga ===
Vijnanabhiksu states that the tanmatras exist in unspecialized forms as an indeterminate state of matter that cannot ordinarily be distinguished from one another or perceived by the senses, but that the yogins alone can perceive. The five tanmatras—sabda, sparsha, rupa, rasa, and gandha associated respectively with the gross elements akasa, vayu (air), tejas (fire), ap (water), and kshiti (earth), generate the paramanus in which they exist as parts (tanmatravayava), and which may be compared with the trasarenu of the Vaisheshika school. Vijnanbhiksu, in his Yoga-vartikka, states that the gunas are in reality Vaisheshika atoms and Vyasa Bhashya regards that in the tanmatras there exists the specific differentiation that constitutes the five tanmatras.

The formation of bhutas through tattvantra-parinama is followed by dharmaparinama, or evolution by change of qualities. In the production of a thing, the different gunas do not choose different independent courses, but join together and effect the evolution of a single product. The appearance of a thing is only an explicit aspect of the selfsame thing—the atoms. Quality is a nature of substance and any change in substance is owing to changed qualities. The lakshana-parinama aspect of the change in appearance refers to the three different moments of the same thing, according to its different characters as unmanifested, or manifested, or manifested in the past but conserved. It is in the avastha-parinama aspect of that change that a substance is called new or old, grown, or decayed.

=== Vedanta ===
The tanmatras evolve out of the bhutadi which is only an intermediate state. They have some mass and the energy and physical characteristics—such as penetrability, power of impact, radiant heat, and viscous attraction—and affect the senses after assuming the form of paramanus, or atoms, of the bhutas (the created ones), the process being called tattavantraparinama, or primary evolution. In evolution, the total energy always remains the same, redistributed among causes and effects, the totality of effects exists in the totality of causes in the potential form. The collocations and regroupings of the three gunas (attributes or properties) induce more differentiated evolutes. The regroupings constitute the changes leading to evolutions, i.e. from cause to effect, which is based on the process known as satkaryavada, the doctrine that the effect is existent in the cause even before the causal process has started to produce the effect, which operates in accordance with the laws of conservation of matter and energy.

The suksma bhutas combine in different proportions with the radical, as its material cause, and other bhutas, as the efficient cause, to form the mahabhutas. Suksma bhutas and panus, or paramanus, (atoms) cannot exist in the phenomenal state in an uncombined form. Two atoms combine as a result of parispanda (rotary or vibratory motion) to form a dvyanuka (molecule); three of these dvyanukas combine to form a tryanuka, and so on, until heavier metals are formed. Excepting akasha, all other tanmatras have attributes of the previous ones in the succeeding ones. The tanmatras are quanta of energy. The total sattwik aspects of the five tanmatras combine to form the antah-karana or inner-instrument consisting of manas, buddhi, citta, and ahamkara. The individual sattwik aspects of tanmatras combine to produce the jnana-indriyas consisting of the five sense organs of perception. The total rajasik aspects of tanmatras of the five tanmatras combine to form the five pranas—prana, apna, vyana, udana, and samana. The individual rajasik aspects of tanmatras combine to produce the five organs of action. The individual tamasik aspects of the five tanmatras combine to form the elements that make up the world, through the process of panchikarana.

== Sources ==
- Sharma, Chandradhar (2000-01-01). A Critical Survey of Indian Philosophy. Motilal Banarsidass Publishing House. ISBN 978-81-208-0365-7.
