= Guṇa =

Indian philosophical concept

Guṇa (Sanskrit: गुण) refers to the three fundamental tendencies or forces that constitute nature, or the matrix of material existence in Hindu philosophies. It can be translated as "quality, peculiarity, attribute, property".

The concept is originally notable as a feature of Samkhya philosophy. The guṇas are now a key concept in nearly all schools of Hindu philosophy. There are three guṇas (triguṇa), according to this worldview, that have always been and continue to be present in all things and beings in the world. These three guṇas are called: sattva (goodness, calmness, harmony), rajas (passion, activity, movement), and tamas (ignorance, inertia, laziness). All of these three guṇas are present in everyone and everything; it is the proportion that is different, according to Hindu worldview. The interplay of these guṇas defines the character of someone or something, of nature and determines the progress of life.

In some contexts, it may mean "a subdivision, species, kind, quality", or an operational principle or tendency of something or someone. In human behavior studies, Guna means personality, innate nature, and psychological attributes of an individual.

Like many technical terms in other languages, guṇa can be difficult to encapsulate with a single English word. Its original and common meaning is a thread, implying the original materials that weave together to make up reality. The usual, but approximate translation in common usage is "a quality".

== Terminology ==
Guna appears in many ancient and medieval Indian texts. Depending on the context, it means:

- string or thread, rope, sinew, chord (music, vowel phonology and arts literature)
- virtue, merit, excellence (dharma and soteriological literature)
- quality, peculiarity, tendency, attribute, property, species (sastras, sutras, the Epics, food and analytical literature)

=== The root and origins ===
Guṇa is both a root and a word in Sanskrit. Its different context-driven meanings are derived from either the root or the word. In verse VI.36 of Nirukta by Yāska, a 1st millennium BC text on Sanskrit grammar and language that preceded Panini, Guṇa is declared to be derived from another root Gaṇa, which means "to count, enumerate". This meaning has led to its use in speciation, subdivision, classification of anything by peculiarity, attribute or property. This meaning has also led to its use with prefixes such as Dviguṇa (twofold), Triguṇa (threefold) and so on.

In other contexts, such as phonology, grammar and arts, "Guṇa-" takes the meaning of āmantraṇā (आमन्त्रणा, addressing, invitation) or abhyāsa (अभ्यास, habit, practice). In the Mahabharata Book 6 Chapter 2, the meaning of guṇa similarly comes in the sense of addressing each part (the root implying āmantraṇā), and thereby it means avayava (अवयव, member, subdivision, portion). In Sanskrit treatises on food and cooking, guṇa means quality, tendency and nature of ingredient. Ancient South Indian commentators, such as Lingayasurin, explain that the meaning of guṇa as "thread, string" comes from the root guṇa- in the sense of repetition (abhyāsa), while the Telugu commentator Mallinatha explains the root guṇa- is to be understood in Sisupalavadha as āmredana (आम्रेडन, reiteration, repetition). Larson and Bhattacharya suggest that the "thread" metaphor relates to that which connects and runs between what we objectively observe to the tattva (तत्त्व, elementary property, principle, invisible essence) of someone or something.

In the context of philosophy, morality and understanding nature, "Guna-" with more dental na takes the meaning of addressing quality, substance, tendency and property. In abstract discussion, it includes all hues of qualities – desirable, neutral or undesirable; but if unspecified, it is assumed with good faith to be good and divine in Indian philosophy. Thus, Guṇi from the root "Guṇa-" means someone or something with "divine qualities", as in Svetasvatara Upanishad hymn VI.2.

== The gunas under various philosophies ==
Innate qualities and tendencies are key ancient concepts in Indian literature. Maitrayaniya Upanishad is one of the earliest texts making an explicit reference to Hindu trinity of Brahma, Vishnu and Shiva and linking them to their Guna – as creator/activity, preserver/purity, destroyer/recycler respectively. The idea of three types of guṇa, innate nature and forces that together transform and keep changing the world is, however, found in numerous earlier and later Indian texts.

=== Samkhya school of Hinduism ===
In Samkhya philosophy, a guṇa is one of three "attributes, tendencies, qualities": sattva, rajas and tamas. This category of guṇas has been widely adopted by various schools of Hinduism for categorizing behavior and natural phenomena. The three qualities are:

- Sattva is the guṇa of balance, harmony, goodness, purity, universal-ism, holism, construction, creativity, positivity, peacefulness, and virtue.
- Rajas is the guṇa of passion, activity, neither good nor bad and sometimes either, self-centeredness, egoism, individualization, drivenness, movement, and dynamism.
- Tamas is the guṇa of imbalance, disorder, chaos, anxiety, impurity, destruction, delusion, negativity, dullness or inactivity, apathy, inertia or lethargy, violence, viciousness, and ignorance.

Scholars of Samkhya have three main views on defining what gunas are. They are seen as either substances, qualities, or capacities. As substances, they are seen to have the ability to bind the jiva to matter. For example, rajas binds a person to action and its fruits.

In Indian philosophy, these qualities are not considered present in an either-or fashion. Rather, everyone and everything has all three, only in different proportions and in different contexts. The living being or substance is viewed as the net result of the joint effect of these three qualities.

According to Samkya school, no one and nothing is either purely Sattvik or purely Rajasik or purely Tamasik. One's nature and behavior constitute a complex interplay of all three guṇas, in varying degrees. In some, the conduct is Rajasik with significant influence of Sattvik guṇa; in some it is Rajasik with significant influence of Tamasik guṇa, and so on.

The balance of Gunas of everything and everyone can change and does. However, change in one quality faces inertia from other two qualities in Indian worldview. Change needs internal or external influence or reinforcement, as knowledge and force to transform. The force to change comes from the Rajas guṇa, the Sattva guṇa empowers one towards harmonious and constructive change, while Tamas guṇa checks or retards the process.

In Indian mythology, Vishnu is envisioned with more Sattva, Brahma with more Rajas, and Shiva seen with all three Gunas.

Samkhya cosmology combines the three guṇas with primal matter (universe, Prakrti). These are present in all things and beings in the world, and it is their interplay that defines the physical and psychological character and nature. They serve as the fundamental operating principles or 'tendencies' of prakṛti which are called: sattva guṇa, rajas guṇa, and tamas guṇa. When any of the guṇa is out of balance in a being or object, the Samkhya school suggests that a pattern of evolution starts, affecting not only itself but its environment. Purusha, or consciousness, is considered separate from Prakriti and changeless.

=== Nyaya school of Hinduism ===
In Nyaya (Generality or common features) school of Hinduism, there is extensive debate on what Guna means, and whether quality is innate, subjective or describable. Early scholars of this school identified 17 qualities, which later scholars expanded to 24 guṇas. Different scholars of this school list the 24 differently; for example, Bhasarvajna disallows 6 of the 24 commonly accepted by the ancient scholars. The most commonly accepted list is: color, taste, smell, touch, number, contact, disjunction, farness, nearness, dimension, separateness, knowledge, pleasure, frustration, desire, hatred, effort, weight, fluidity, viscosity, dispositional tendency, merit, demerit, and sound.

Nyaya school considers quality as non-repeatable, a conceptual theme not found in Western philosophy where "quality" is presumed to be repeatable. It is also not found in some parallel schools of Hinduism. Repeatability means that the white in one object is same as white in other object, and white means the same thing. Nyaya scholars hold that "whiteness" is a guṇa of "white", but that is different from "whiteness" of an object or living being. To them, white has many hues and the "whiteness" is subjective.

In Laksanavali, an ancient Indian text by Udayana, Guna is discussed with more nuance. For example, he writes, "quality of earth" is specific only if it meets three conditions: it occurs in earth, does not occur in anything that is not earthy, and be a distinctive quality that cannot be described as combination of other qualities.

There are twenty four gunas mentioned in the joint school of Nyaya - Vaisheshika system in the Indian philosophy. For example, the Indian philosopher Praśastapāda had mentioned the term gurutva (Sanskrit: गुरुत्व) as the cause of the act of falling, in his commentary text Praśastapādabhāṣya on the Vaisheshika Sutra of Maharshi Kanada. According to him, gurutva is the quality of the paramanus of prithvi and ap (water). Gurutva is a Sanskrit word made from two terms guru and tva. The term guru has meaning of weight or heaviness. And the term tva is a Sanskrit affix to convert an adjective word into an abstract noun. When the affix term tva is added after the term guru, then the compound word gurutva takes the form of an abstract noun.

In the commentary texts Padarthadharmasamgraha of Prashastapada and Nyayakandali of Shridhara, the Gurutva is an imperceptible quality of the dravyas prithvi and jala. It cannot be perceived by any of the sense organs. It is only inferable from its effect of the falling of substances. Sankara Mishra in his commentary text Upaskara explained the sutra 5.1.7 of the Vaisheshika Sutra which gives the reference of the term gurutva. According to him, gurutva is the cause of falling in the absence of conjunction. He states that the term conjunction indicates every type of impediments. The quality of gurutva is eternal existence in the paramanus of the dravyas so it can't be destroyed. But the effect of gurutva can be neutralised by conjunction, effort and faculty (speed form). When gurutva is interrupted by these, its effect is neutralised. In the text Vaisheshika Sutra, there is a sutra regarding conjunction as

॥ संयोगाभावे गुरुत्वात् पतनम् ॥ ॥ saṃyogābhāve gurutvāt patanam ॥

— Maharshi Kanada, Vaisheshika Sutra, 5.1.7 (Sutra)

The Vaisheshika sutra 5.1.7 translates as "In the absence of conjunction, gurutva causes falling effect".

Similarly there is a sutra regarding saṃskāra (speed form) as

॥ संस्काराभावे गुरुत्वात् पतनम् ॥ ॥ saṃskārābhāve gurutvāt patanam ॥

— Vaisheshika Sutra, 5.1.18

The Vaisheshika sutra 5.1.18 translates as "In the absence of propulsive energy generated by action (saṃskāra), gurutva causes falling effect".

In the combined Nyayavaisesika school, the twenty four gunas are divided into two types on the basis of generality and speciality of the gunas. They are sāmānya guṇas (general qualities) and viśeṣa guṇas (special qualities). The gunas which exist in two or more than two dravyas are called as sāmānya guṇas and similarly the gunas which specially exist in only one type of dravya are called as viśeṣa guṇas. Since gurutva exists in the two types of dravyas namely prithvi and jala, so it is classified as a sāmānya guṇa.

On the basis of its existence, it is classified as both eternal and non eternal (evanescent) gunas. It is eternal gunas for the paramanus of the dravyas prithvi and jala. Similarly it is non eternal (evanescent) gunas for composite materials. On the basis of perception, it is classified as atīndriyaguṇas. The atīndriyaguṇas are those gunas which are not perceptible by external sense organs.

=== Vaisheshika school of Hinduism ===
In Vaisheshika school of Hinduism, which is most related to Nyaya school, states that our awareness, understanding and judgments of any person and thing in the world is relational. All relations, holds this school of Hinduism, is dyadic between anuyogin (referend) and pratiyogin (referent). Guna (quality) is considered one of the seven padārtha (category) of relations. The others are: inherence (samavaya), being (bhava), genus (samanya), species (vishesha), substance (dravya) and motion/action (karman). Unlike Vaisheshika, Nyaya considers inherence as subset of guṇa (quality).

Gangesha, a Nyaya scholar, suggests a somewhat different theory, stating that our awareness is of two types – true and false. True awareness is produced when we seek to observe some excellence (guṇa) in its cause, while false awareness results from observing fault (dosha) in its cause. In other words, in Gangesha's perspective, the observer's state of mind and attitude affects relational awareness.

=== Bhagavad Gita ===
Chapters 2, 3, 7, 13, 14, 17 and 18 of Bhagavad Gita discuss Guna.

Verse 17.2 describes the three gunas as innate nature, which Krishna instructs Arjuna to transcend. Sattvic guṇa is one driven by what is pure, truth, compassionate, without craving, doing the right because it is right, positive and good. Tamasic guṇa is one driven by what is impure, dark, destructive, aimed to hurt another, contemptuous, negative and vicious. Rajasic guṇa is one that is ego-driven, out of personal passion, active, ostentatious, seeking the approval of others. One is encouraged to turn tamasic action into rajasic, rajasic into sattvic, and ultimately sattvic action into bhakti (devotion).

In Chapters 17 and 18, Krishna differentiates items and actions by their guna. Sattvic austerity is that which is performed with deep faith. Austerity becomes rajasic when it is done to get praise from others. Austerity is tamasic when it entails self-torture or harm toward others.

Charity is sattvic when it is given to someone who has not done something for you before, given with a sense of duty, and to a worthy person. Charity is rajasic when it is done grudgingly or with the expectation of getting something in return. Charity is tamasic when it is given at the wrong time and place, without respect, and with contempt.

Verses 18.23-25 describe sattvic, rajasic, and tamasic action. Action is sattvic when it is thought out and done without expectation for its results. Action is rajasic when it is done out of wanting pleasure or selfishness. Action is tamasic when one doesn't think through the consequences and ignores possible harm to one's self or others.

Similarly, knowledge that is attached to object of action, without concern for understanding the cause, without concern for purpose or significance, is Tamasic knowledge; knowledge that is segregated, that considers everything unconnected, individualistic and meaningless is Rajasic; knowledge that sees one being in all beings, that seeks the whole, a unity in diversity, and similarities in the divided components is Sattvic.

The Gita also categorizes the buddhi per the three gunas. A sattvic buddhi is one that is useful for moksha. It is able to discern what is within dharma and what is not. A tamasic buddhi sees dharma as adharma and adharma as dharma.

Sattvic happiness comes from tranquility in one's heart and even if it starts difficult due to keeping up with a constant practice, leads to getting rid of suffering. Rajasic happiness comes from instant gratification and eventually leads to suffering. Tamasic happiness comes from laziness, sleep, and negligence.

== Guna in theory of ethics ==
Guna is one of the four important elements in the framework of ethical theories in Indian philosophy. Bommer et al. suggest that ethical/non-ethical behavior is an outcome of individual attributes, personal environment, social environment and institutional rules and laws. Guna theory is the ancient Indian philosophy on individual attributes, while the theories of dharma and ashramas address the personal and social environment, as well as part of its institutional framework. Guna theory, states Crawford, represents a hierarchical theory of values, where the relative order of hierarchy is suggested to vary within each individual along with the relative proportion of each guṇa. The interplay of three guṇas affect an individual's values, and in Hindu worldview, these values affect individual's actions, as well as the happiness and serenity experienced by the individual. The guṇas are not considered static and set. Hindu literature, such as the Bhagavad Gita, state it to be dynamic and changeable with knowledge, introspection and understanding of sva-dharma. Realizing one's sva-dharma and Self is emphasized in Indian ethical theories. The highest state of existence and bliss, in Advaita school of Hinduism for example, is jivanmukti (Self-realization) and moksha.

Guna theory's perspective on values constituting human personality is unique yet congruent with other ethical theories.

== Guna in other contexts ==
=== Sanskrit grammar ===
In the Sanskrit grammatical tradition (Vyakarana), guṇa refers to a set of normal-length vowels that are less reduced than the basic set (in modern terms, the zero grade), but more reduced than the vṛddhi vowels (in modern terms, the lengthened grade). As an example, ṛ, i, u are basic (zero-grade) vowels, with corresponding guṇa (full-grade) vowels ar, e, o and vṛddhi (lengthened-grade) vowels ār, ai, au. (This is more understandable once it is realized that, at an earlier stage of development, Sanskrit e and o were ai and au, and Sanskrit ai and au were āi and āu.) Guṇa corresponds to what is now termed the full grade in Indo-European ablaut. Another orthography and phonology concept related to Guṇa is Vṛddhi. These innovations are not unique to Sanskrit, but also found in Greek, Latin, Italian and to some extent Russian. Guna and other rules of language for Sanskrit are described by Pāṇini in his Ashtadhyayi.

=== Ayurveda ===
In the terminology of Ayurveda (traditional medicine), guṇa can refer to one of twenty fundamental properties which any substance can exhibit, arranged in ten pairs of antonyms, viz. heavy/light, cold/hot, unctuous/dry, dull/sharp, stable/mobile, soft/hard, non-slimy/slimy, smooth/coarse, minute/gross, viscous/liquid.

Guṇa is also a concept in Ayurvedic medicine, as a system to assess conditions and diets. For this reason triguṇa and tridosha are considered to be related in the traditions of Ayurveda.

== See also ==
- Guṇa (Jainism), the concept in Jainism
- Jain (Satvika)
- Maya
- Nirguna Brahman, Saguna Brahman
