= Dvyanuka =

Combination of two same type of Paramanus

द्व्यणुक
- Combination of two Paramanus
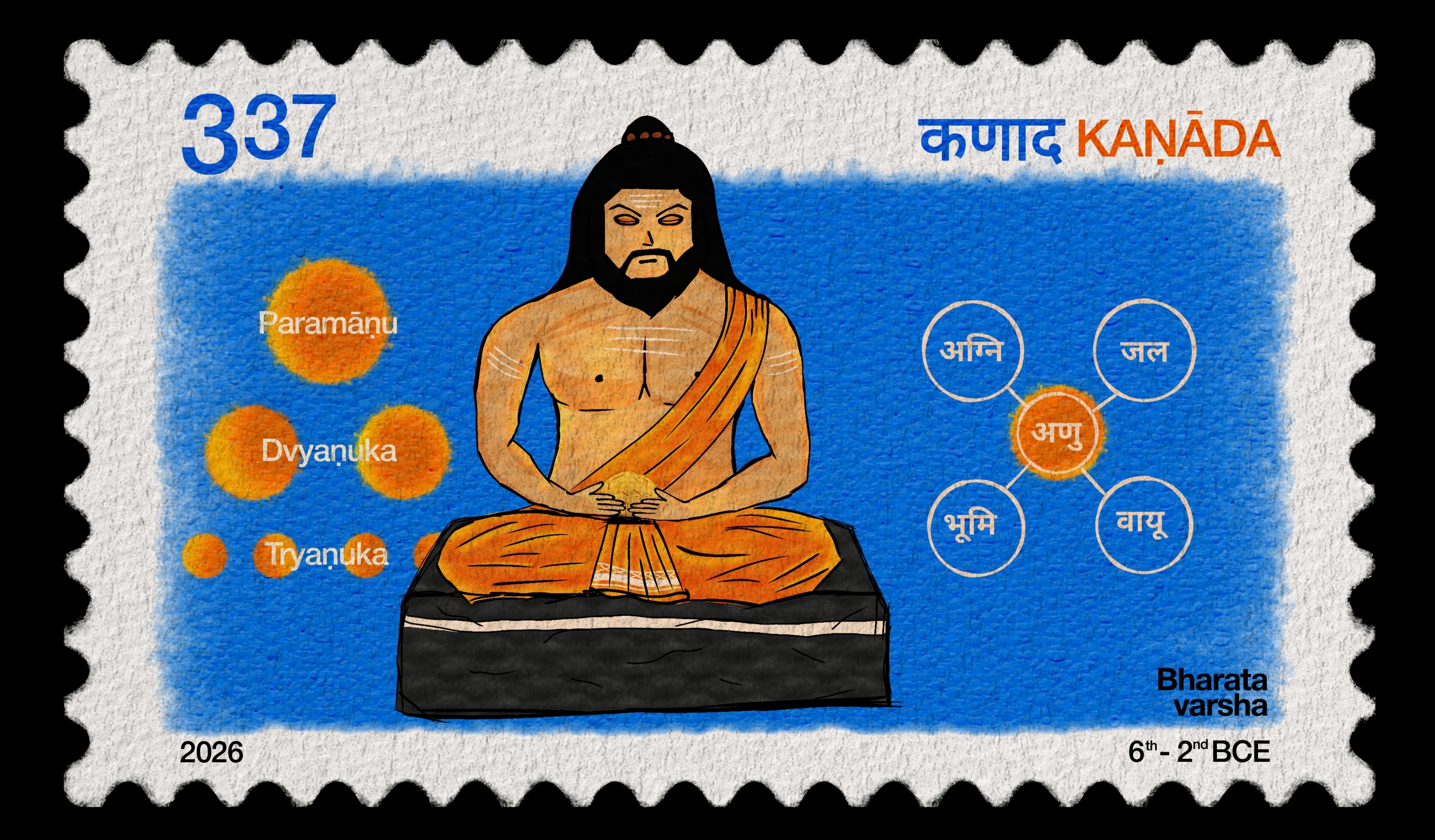
- Illustration of the atomic theory of Acharya Kanada showing Paramāṇu, Dvyaṇuka, and Tryaṇuka concepts from the Vaisheshika philosophy.

Classification
- First product out of Paramanus

Existence
- Non Eternal

Concept
- Introduced by: Prashastapada

Modification
- Modified by: Udayanacharya

Description
- Text: Vaisheshika

Dvyanuka (Sanskrit: द्व्यणुक, Romanised: Dvyaṇuka) is the combination of two Paramāṇus of the same type mentioned in the text Vaisheshika Sutra of the Vaisheshika school of thought in the Indian philosophy. According to Vaisheshika school, Dvyanukas are formed when two Parāmaṇus of the same type come into close proximity and under the influence of specific forces.

According to the Indian Journal of History of Science, the Indian philosopher Praśastapāda first introduced the theory of the Dvyanuka in the Vaisheshika school of Indian philosophy. Later, the other prominent Indian philosopher Udyanacharya from the Vaisheshika school in Mithila, made some certain modifications in the theory of Dvyanuka.

In the text Vaisheshika, Praśastapāda introduced Dvyanuka as the first product out of the Paramanus of introduced by the ancient Vedic philosopher Kaṇāda.

Statue of Maharshi Kanada at the entrance of the Uchchaith Bhagwati Mandir in Mithila.

== Etymology ==
Dvyanuka is a Sanskrit compound word having two terms dvi (dvy) and aṇuka. The literal meaning of the term dvi or dvy is two and that of the term anuka is atom. Thus the literal meaning of the compound term Dvyanuka is the combination or aggregation of two atoms (paramanus).

== Description ==
The Dvyanuka is a fundamental concept in Vaisheshika philosophy, representing the initial step in the process of creation and the building blocks of all material objects in the universe. Dvyanuka is also called as dyad. The Dvyanukas are non eternal objects.

According to the Vaisheshika philosophy, during the formation of the dvyanuka from two same type of paramanus, all the qualities except the specific measures of pārimāndalya of the paramanus transferred to the product dvyanuka. Sometimes, the dvyanuka is also called the parent Paramanu. Although the dvyanuka is product, its quantity remains same as that of the original paramanu.

== Force and action ==
The cause of the interaction of two Dvyanukas. The first cause of action in two dvayanukas is the external agent, the Adṛṣṭa ( adrishta ). The adrishta is carried along with the eternal soul (Paramatma). The eternal soul carries it in relation to the previous creation.
