= Bhuman =

Sanskrit word meaning fullness

- Samkhya: Kapila
- Yoga: Patanjali
- Vaisheshika: Kaṇāda, Prashastapada
- Secular: Valluvar

Bhuman (Sanskrit:भूमन) means fullness or abundance; It is a synonym of Brahman. The word, Bhuman, is derived from the word, Bahu, meaning much or many, with the suffix – imam, added after it by dropping – i, to impart the sense of the abstract noun. This word refers directly to the Supreme Self who is superior to Prana though Prana is Bhuman because of proximity where the vow of Prana, consisting in transcending all other thing is alluded to.

Brahman has avyama ('unlimited extension in terms of space'); it is sarvagata ('omnipresent'), ananta ('infinite'); it is called Bhuman ('plenitude') and is nirvayava or ('without parts') and arupvad ('formless'), and eternal because it is aksara ('imperishable'). Brahman is Bhuman, the plenitude which transcends the sum of its parts and yet fully inheres in them. The quality of being the Bhuman (plenitude) etc.; ascribed by the Śrutis agrees well with the highest Self, which is the cause of everything. Brahman resides in its entirety within the smallest particle imaginable and yet remains the ayatana, the receptacle, or bhuman, the totality which transcends the sum of these parts.

Bhuman is not the human soul, the companion of Prana; Bhuman is Ānanda (Bliss), immense joy. Samprasada also refers to the released soul. The consideration of happiness induces and impels man to perform actions, had he experienced unhappiness in his pursuit he would not have gone in for the actions at all; but real happiness is that which one enjoys in the vision of the Infinite. The Doctrine of Ananda (Bliss) is central to the philosophy of Vedanta. Ananda conveys a sense of infinite, eternal, absolute happiness and not selfish pleasure which is transitory gratification but a state of absolute expansion called Bhuman. Bhuman is illimitation. Ananda, the supreme pleasure, is in illimitation and not in the limited (alpa).

यो वै भूमा तत्सुखं, नाल्पे सुखमस्ति Bhuman is that happiness.

Brahman is the Absolute to be distinguished from Prajapati and from Prana, the Vital force, directly identified with life (ayuh) and consciousness (Prajna). Badarayana declares -

भूमा सम्प्रसादादध्युपदेशात् | (Brahma Sutra I.iii.8)
"Bhuman is the supreme Self, since he is taught as superior to samprasada (Prana)".

Panini explains that the word, Bhuman, is derived from the word Bahu meaning much; many, with the suffix imam added after it by dropping – i to impart the sense of the abstract noun. Adi Sankara in his Bhasya states that this word is introduced without discarding Prana to mean Prana is Brahman. But, here the instruction is that Bhuman is superior to Prana therefore Prana cannot be Brahman because from Brahman proceeds Prana (Chandogya Upanishad VII.xxvi.1). According to Madhava, Bhuman is that which is beyond all and not merely beyond Prana alone; if it is something subsequent to Prana it cannot be Brahman.
