= Akāraṇavat =

Concept of eternal existence

Akāraṇavat (Sanskrit: अकारणवत्) is a concept of eternal existence mentioned in the Indian philosophical text Vaisheshika Sutra. According to the concept of akāraṇavat, the eternal is that which is existent and uncaused.

== Etymology ==
Akāraṇavat is a Sanskrit word having two terms akāraṇa (cause free) and vat (affix term). The literal meaning of akāraṇa is cause-free. When the affix term vat is added after the word akāraṇa, then the compound term akāraṇavat takes the form of possessive adjective. Thus the literal meaning of the term akāraṇavat is being free from causation.

== Description ==
The concept of the Akāraṇavat is mentioned in the fourth chapter of the text Vaisheshika Sutra. The first verse of the fourth chapter mentioned the concept of the Akāraṇavat for the ultimate atoms (Paramanu). According to Maharshi Kanada, the ultimate atoms are eternal, uncaused, non-destructive and are inferred from their effects.

॥ सत् अकारणवत् नित्यम् ॥ ॥ sat akāraṇavat nityam ॥

— Maharshi Kanada, Vaisheshika Sutra, Verse 4.1.1

Sankara Mishra in his commentary text Upaskara explained the concept. According to him, Akāraṇavat means the absence of the preceding cause. In the second verse or sutra of the fourth chapter, the mark of the existence of the ultimate atoms is mentioned.

॥ तस्य कार्यं लिङ्गम् ॥ ॥ tasya kāryaṃ liṅgam ॥

— Verse 4.1.2

According to the second Sutra of the fourth chapter, the mark of the existence of the ultimate atoms is inferred from their effects.

== Essence ==
That which exists in the form of primordial substance—being causeless yet subject to transformation, and eternal—is the "root cause" of the universe, and it is termed "Prakriti.". It is the essence of the philosophical concept Akāraṇavat.
