= Namarupa-vyakarana =

- Samkhya: Kapila
- Yoga: Patanjali
- Vaisheshika: Kaṇāda, Prashastapada
- Secular: Valluvar

Nāmarūpa-vyākaraṇa (Sanskrit: नामरुपव्याकरण), in Hindu philosophy, refers to the process of evolution of differentiation into names and forms i.e. to the unfolding of the primal state into the manifest world prior to which unfolding there was nothing that existed; it refers to the conditioned reality.

== History and overview ==
=== Upanishads and Vedantic commentaries ===
In the Upanishads this term is used to indicate the self-willed manifestation of Brahman under visible and nameable aspects, to the said manifestation into the fictitious plurality of the phenomenal world owing to maya, the unreal adjunct. According to Hindu scriptures the world in each age emanates from Brahman mirrored upon maya.

The sage of the Chandogya Upanishad regarded the creation of the universe as a huge chest/egg from a Primeval Being existing as the undifferentiated whole, who alone existed without a second prior to the commencement of the process of creation which was the beginning of the differentiation of the undifferentiated. "The Primeval Being reflected, let me be many, let me produce; having bethought, thus to itself, it produced fire which produced water and from water was produced the Earth (food or matter)" (Chandogya Upanishad 6.2.1-4). The doctrine of trivritkarana, the prototype of the doctrine of Panchikarana that tells us how matter came unto existence originating from the primordial five subtle elements, belongs to this Upanishad. From the subtle elements were produced all gross elements, and all matter having names and forms that makes-up the entire universe.

Adhikarana Saravali of Sri Vedanta Desika (Sloka 9.21-22) explains that the evolution of names and forms is the work of the Universal Self and not of the Individual self. All creation, and actions which produce results are willed and bestowed by God. However, Badarayana refutes the views held by the Mimamsakas that all results are produced by virtuous deeds alone, he states:

पूर्वं तु बादरायणो हेतुव्यपदेशात्
"But Badarayana considers the earlier One (as the bestower of results), because He is mentioned as the cause of even action."

— Brahma Sutras (3.2.41)

In this context citing Bhagavada Gita (Sloka 7.21-22), Shankara clarifies that "in all the Upanishads creations are declared as the acts of Ishvara (God) (who is Brahman associated with Maya- inherent power in Brahman through which Brahman appears/projects this universe. In Sanskrit, Ishvara is "Mayaopahita-chaitanya"- Pure Consciousness or Brahman in association with Maya.) whose bestowing of results consists precisely in His creating the creatures according to individual merits". He also cites Mundaka Upanishad which declares that from Brahman originates Prana etc., (2.1.3) and this world is nothing but Brahman (2.2.11), he had earlier in his Bhasya explained that Brahman is the origin of all things and thought, Brahman becomes manifested through names and forms in several stages and related by being the material causes and products; implied that namarupa works as catalyst that spontaneously produces the multifaceted world commonly experienced by all living beings.

== See also ==
- Namarupa
