= Svayambhu =

Sanskrit term meaning self-born

- Samkhya: Kapila
- Yoga: Patanjali
- Vaisheshika: Kaṇāda, Prashastapada
- Secular: Valluvar

Svayambhu (Sanskrit: स्वयम्भू, romanized: Svayambhū, lit. 'self-born') is a Sanskrit word that means "self-born", "self-manifested", "self-existing", or "that that is created by its own accord". Various deities and entities featured in Hindu literature and tradition are regarded to be svayambhu, such as Brahman in the Upanishads, and the Trimurti of Brahma, Vishnu, and Shiva, and Manu in the Puranas.

The term svayambhu is also used to describe the belief of a self-manifested image (murti) of a deity present in a temple, which is described to be not of human creation, but of natural or divine origin. Such images are described in some of the regional legends of religious sites called the sthala puranas. Some of the best examples of such images include the twelve Jyotirlinga images of Shiva, and Venkateswara image of Vishnu.

== Etymology ==
Svayambhu is a portmanteau of the Sanskrit words svayam (स्वयम्) which means 'self' or 'on its own' and bhū (भू) which means 'to take birth' or 'arising'.

== Literature ==
According to the Brahmanas, the Brahman, the Ultimate Reality, is described to be svayambhu and the cause of all life and the universe.

The Manusmriti describes the creation of Brahma from the Svayambhu, applied as a term to denote Brahman. The mind of Brahman is stated to have produced the golden, germinal substance that created the Hiranyagarbha, the primordial egg, from which the creator deity manifested.

The status of a deity as svayambhu is observed to vary according to literature and a given tradition. For instance, while the Manusmriti and Srimad Bhagavatam describes Brahma to be Svayambhu, whereas the Mahabharata asserts that Brahma manifested from the lotus that emerged from Vishnu, transferring the status from the former to the latter. The Srimad Bhagavatam also accords the status to Svayambhuva Manu, the first man born during a given age of the earth.

== See also ==
- Acheiropoieta in the Christian tradition, literally, "works made without human hands"
- Swayambhunath
- Soyombo symbol
