= Abhava =

Sanskrit philosophical term for absence

Abhava means non-existence, negation, nothing, or absence. It is the negative of Bhava which means being, becoming, existing or appearance. Two traditions famously held that absence or non-being is a real thing (vastu). According to the Nyaya tradition, one comes to know about non-being based on perception. The Bhatta Mimamsa tradition argues that there is a sixth pramana, itself known by the name of abhava, through which one comes to know non-being. The Buddhist tradition argues against these two traditions, holding that non-being does not exist as a real thing.

== Overview ==
=== Nyaya ===
In the Nyaya tradition, one comes to know of absence based on perceptual episodes. An analogy is drawn to perception of color. In both cases, the perception is mediated, unlike perception of ordinary objects where the perception is unmediated.

Udayana divides Padārtha (Categories) into Bhāva (existence) which is real, and Abhāva (non-existence) which is not real. Dravya (substance), Guṇa (quality), Karma (action), Samanya (community or generality), Visesa (particularity) and Samavaya (inherence) are the marks of existence. Four kinds of Abhava are defined by the Nyaya-Vaisheshika school of Hindu philosophy:

1. Pragabhava - Prior non-existence is the non-existence of an effect in its material cause before production. It has no beginning, but it has an end because it is destroyed by the production of the effect. Without prior non-existence, there would not be an effect.
2. Pradhvamsabhava - Posterior non-existence is the non-existence of an effect due to its destruction. So it has a beginning but no end.
3. Atyantabhava - Absolute non-existence, or absolute negation is non-existence in all times and in all places.
4. Anyonyabhava - Mutual non-existence is a denial of identity between two things, which have a specific nature. Negation other than mutual negation is negation of relation.

Recognised as a real thing within the Nyaya school, abhava is often stated to be the reality of the greatest moment in the pluralistic universe and is connected with Mukti. It is a relative word, for there can be abhava only when previously there is bhava; moreover it is an event occurring in time. The Nyaya school maintains that the cognition of abhava is due to perception involving special kind of contact or sense contact.

=== Mimamsa ===
According to Kumarila, perception and other such pramanas make known what exists. To come to know about an object's non-being aspect, one needs another pramana. According to Kumarila, an object has two aspects, in relation to what it is and in relation to what it is not. For example, a piece of land, in relation to itself, exists, but in relation to being connected with a pot, it does not exist. The particular aspect that one cognizes at a time is based on which aspect one desires to cognize or which one is emergent.

Kumarila position that non-being is something real can be traced to an epistemological principle that trusts things as they appear. This epistemological principle is known as svatah pramanya, or intrinsic validity. For example, if one's cognition of a rock is not contradicted by a future cognition, one must accept that there is a rock. Similarly, given that we have cognitions that an object is not, this too should be accepted as reality.

The position can also be traced to Kumarila's theory of a substance, which holds that the properties of a substance are identical with the substance. In this sense, he holds a unitary theory of substance. But he also holds that the properties are mutually different, given that they each have their own form. Based on this theory of substance, it follows that if an object's non-being is a property of the object, then it is also at least in part identical with the object and thus as real as the object is.

=== Buddhism ===
Buddhists hold that when someone cognizes the non-being of an object, they are merely cognizing something different from that object. For example, when one sees the non-being of a table, one is seeing another object (e.g., a rock), not the actual non-being of the table. Their position, which might be considered highly intuitive, is similar to those of Parmenides and Plato. Against the Mimamsa position, Buddhist philosopher Śāntarakṣita asks why non-being is not known by perception if it is a real thing (vastu). Śāntarakṣita argues that the nature of a real thing naturally separates it from other things, and it is perceptible in virtue of being an existing thing. There thus are not two distinct natures, but only one, because a thing's actual nature separates it from other things, rendering non-being redundant.

Abhava is that unmanifest level from where the concrete Bhava arises or emerges. Vasubandhu has referred to Sunyata having the characteristic of the own-being of abhava, rather than a characteristic consisting of bhava. Sthiramati observes that this is, in fact, not redundant, meaning abhava does not negate bhava. Abhava refers to particular entities and not to Being; it is a theoretical or logical denial of the existence of some particular impossibility. The acceptance of abhava as an independent padartha having ontological reality of its own is a peculiar feature of Indian philosophical tradition. Dharmakirti considered abhava as an anumana. He had brought in the idea of imaginary presence of that whose absence was apprehended in order to explain the specificity of the absence.
