= Nustulapur =

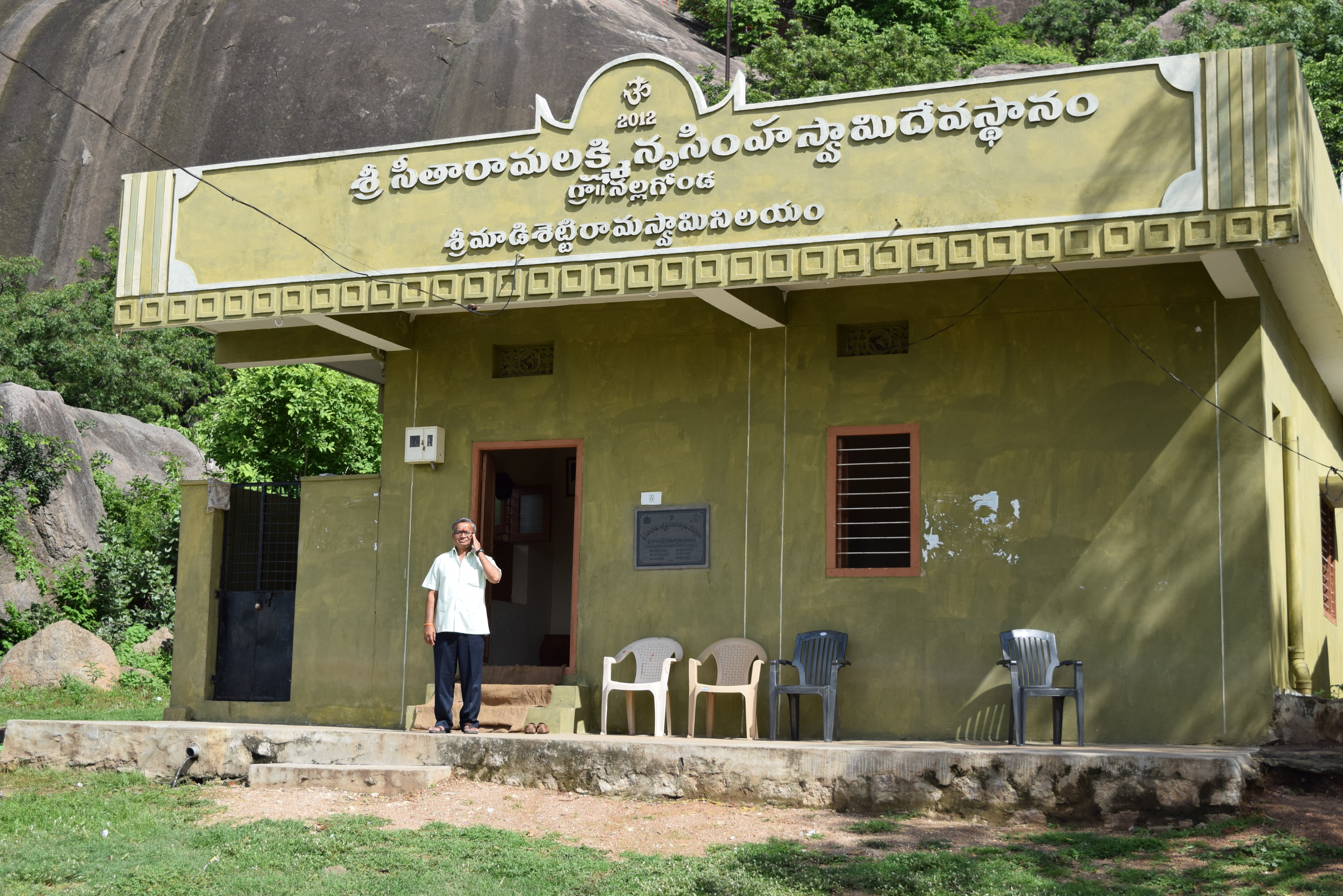
Choultry built by Mr. Ravinder Madishetty S/o Late Mr. Ramaswamy Madishetty

Nustulapur is a small village/town located on the state highway #1 in the state of Telangana. The location code or village code of Nustulapur village is 505481. Nustulapur village is located in Timmapur Tehsil of Karimnagar district in Telangana, India. It is situated 5 km away from sub-district headquarter Timmapur and 12 km away from district headquarter Karimnagar. As per 2009 stats, Nustulapur, indiranagar & ramakrishna Colony is the gram panchayat of Nustulapur village. The total geographical area of village is 2113 hectares. Nustulapur has a total population of 7,098 people. There are about 1,808 houses in Nustulapur village. Present Sarpanch of Nustulapur is Ravula Ramesh. He is one of the most recognized political leaders of Manakondur constituency. Recently Nustulapur is awarded with National Child friendly puraskar in leadership of Ravula Ramesh. Even in past when Ravula Ramesh is sarpanch Nustulapur is awarded with Nirmal Gram puraskar award.

== Places of interest ==
Following are the landmarks of Nustulapur: a) Nallagonda Narasimha Swamy temple b) Weekend cattle market

=== Nallagonda Narasimha Swamy Temple ===
Nallakonda Narasimha Swamy Temple is a centuries old temple. The temple deity is lord Narasimha who is believed to be swayambhu.

The temple hosts an annual festival known as jatara on the eve of holi festival. The temple is under the care take of the endowments department of Telangana. Unfortunately in the last several decades the temple has been neglected without any major upkeep. Most recently (2012), generous donor brothers Mr. Purushotam Madisetty & Mr. Ravinder Madisetty constructed a choultry for the benefit of pilgrims and dedicated it to the temple in remembrance of their father late Mr. Madisetty Ramaswamy. The temple is at the foot hills of a large black stone mountain, hence the name "Nallagonda" which translates to "black stone". Several people strongly believe that making an offering at the temple helps to ward off evil and brings in prosperity.

Gallery

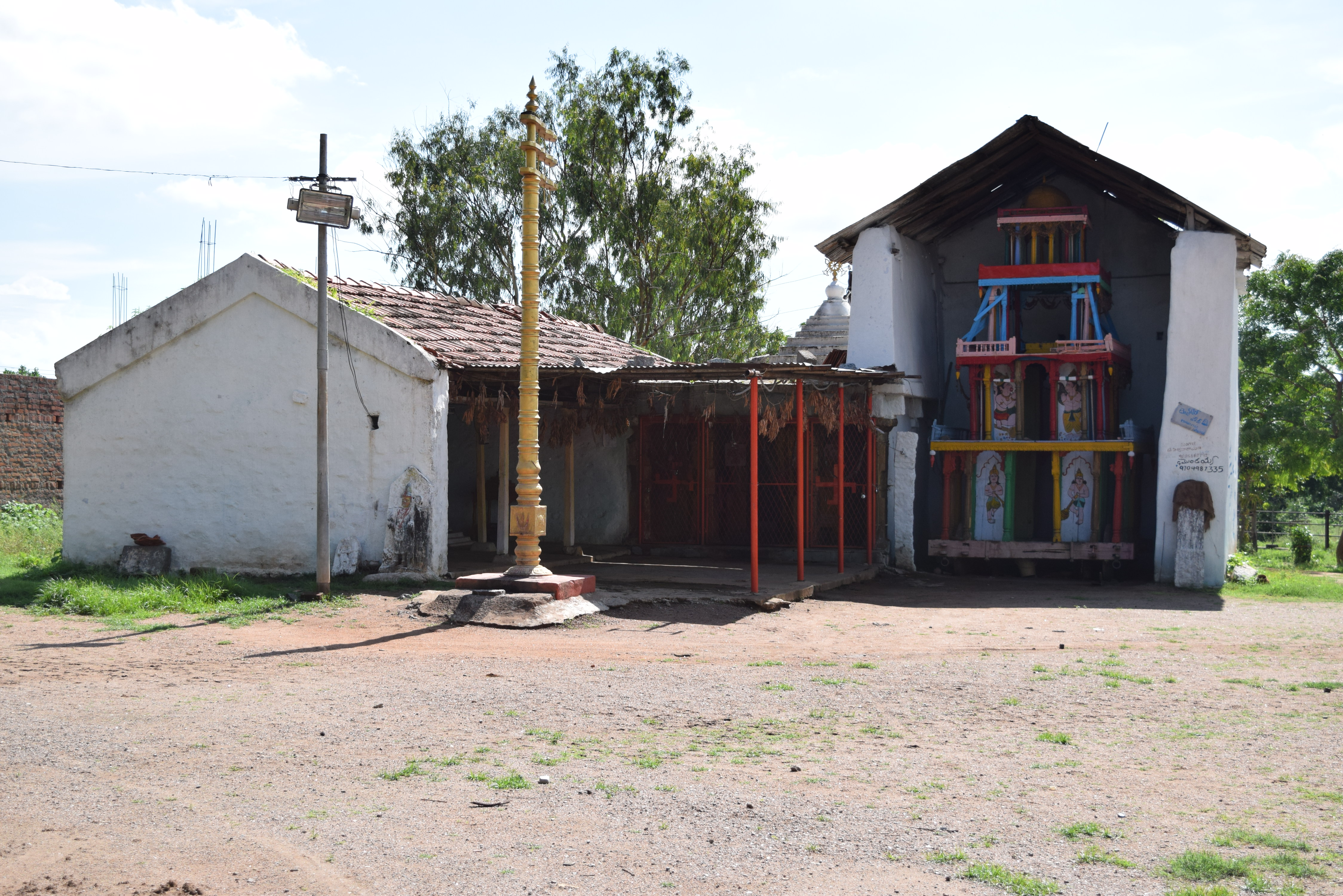
Nallakonda Narasimha Swamy Temple in Nustulapur

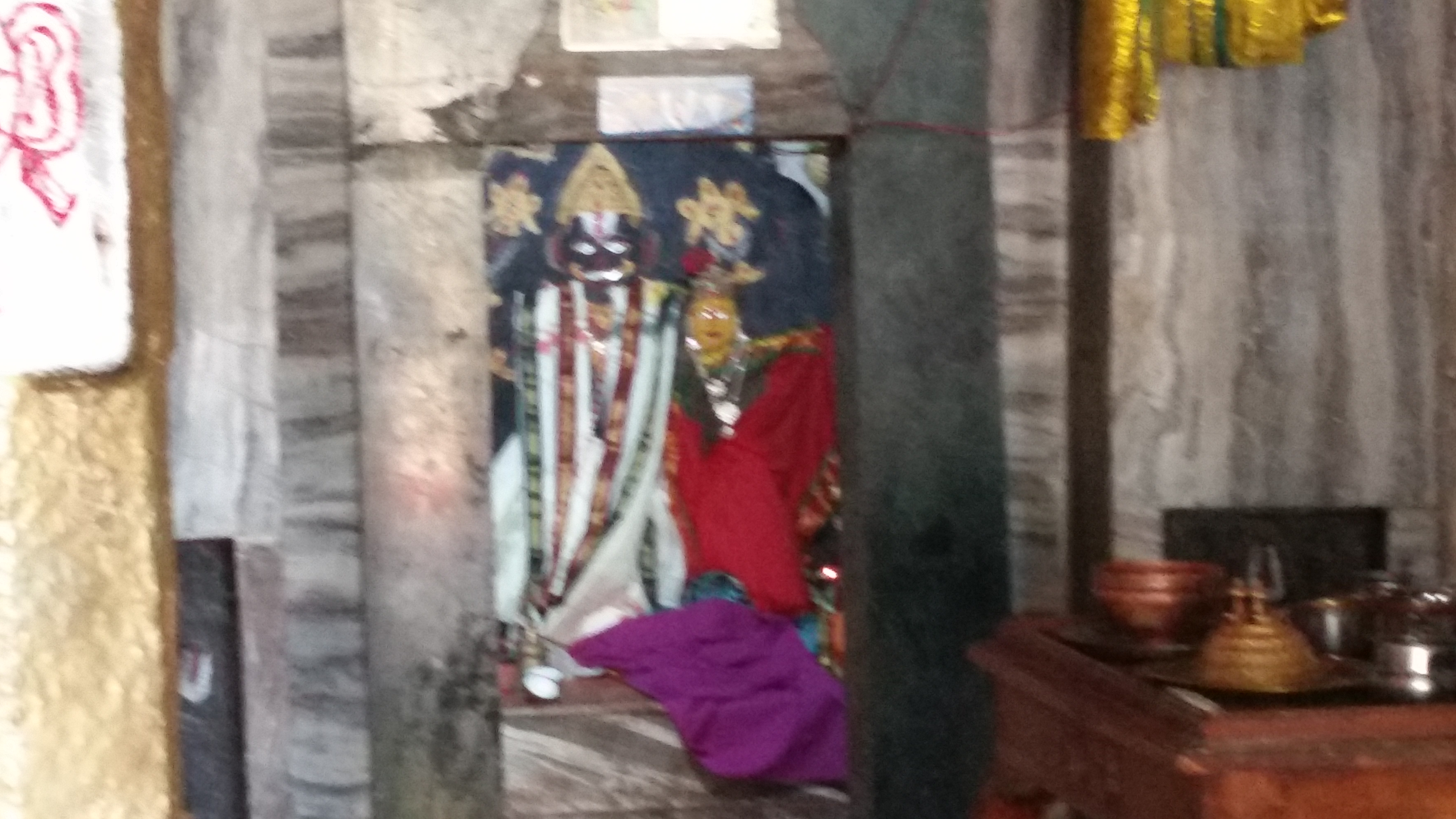
The principal deity at Nallakonda Narasimha Swamy Temple in Nustulapur

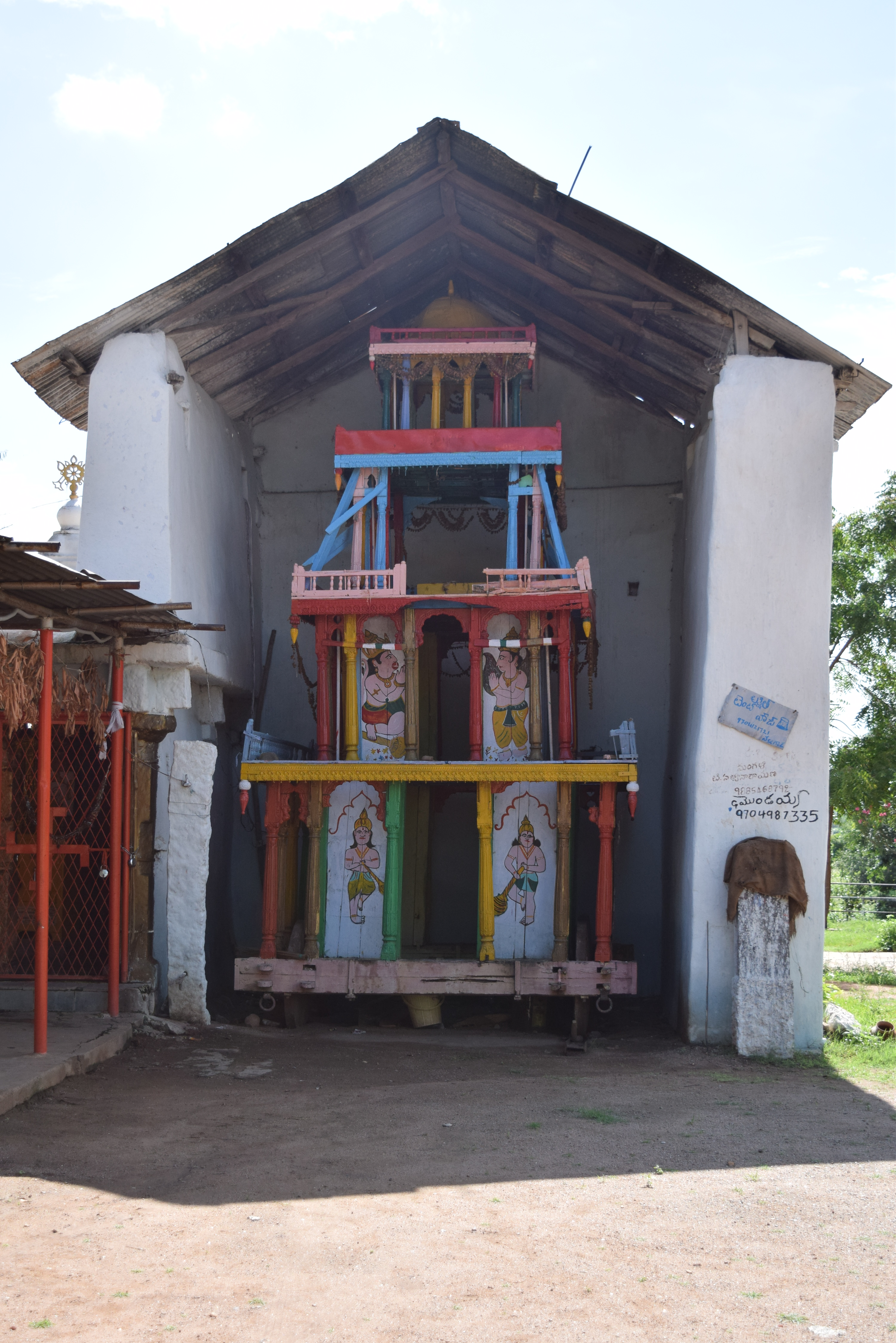
Ratham of Lord Narasimha Swamy Temple
