= Ayachi Mishra Dih =

Historical site in Bihar

- Interactive map of Ayachi Mishra Dih

Monastery information
- Dedication: Nyaya school of Indian philosophy

People
- Founder: Ayachi Mishra
- Important associated figures: Ayachi Mishra, Shankar Mishra

Site
- Location: Sarisab Pahi village, Madhubani district, Mithila region, Bihar
- Country: India
- Visible remains: Mud mound
- Other information: Ancient Mithila University

Ayachi Mishra Dih is a historical site related to the Indian scholar Ayachi Mishra. It is located at Sarisab Pahi village of Madhubani district in Mithila region of Bihar, India. Ayachi Mishra was the scholar of Nyaya school of the Indian philosophy. Ayachi Mishra Dih was the part of the Ancient Mithila University. The historical site is presently maintained by a cultural and religious organisation known as Ayachi Dih Vikas Samiti.

== Description ==
Chief Minister Nitish Kumar of Bihar unveiled the statue of the famous scholar Ayachi Mishra at Ayachi Mishra Dih in 2017. Ayachi Mishra was 14th century AD scholar, teacher and philosopher in Mithila region. His original name was Mahamahopadhyay Pt. Bhavanath Mishra. His model of teaching is known as Ayachi Study Model.
