= Panchikarana =

Vedantic theory

Pancikarana (Sanskrit: पञ्चीकरण, romanized: Pañcīkaraṇa, lit. 'quintuplication') is a Vedantic theory of how matter came into existence, originating from the primordial five subtle elements.

== History ==
Adi Shankara wrote a treatise on this theory, titled – Pancikaranam, which was elaborated by his disciple Sureshvaracharya, and later on commented upon in 2400 slokas by Ramananda Saraswati, disciple of Ramabhadra, and in 160 slokas by Ananda Giri, disciple of Suddhananda Yati.

The Chandogya Upanishad teaches the doctrine of tripartition (trivṛtkaraṇa) from which developed the Vedantic theory of pancikarana with regard to the creation of the transformed evolutes of the original elements. This theory is also found narrated to Narada in the Srimad Devi Bhagavatam.

== Overview ==
Pancikarana is the creation of the elements (bhūtasarga) by a process in which subtle matter (or the prior stage of matter) transforms itself into gross matter. Intelligence is the subtle manifestation of consciousness and matter its gross manifestation.

Pancikarana is the "quintuplication" of the basic/primordial five subtle elements. The subtle elements stand alone (tanmātrā). During pancikarana, each is firstly divided into two halves, one part of which was further divided into four parts, equal to 1/8 parts of each subtle element, which then recombined with the undivided halves of each element. Thus, each of the five gross elements (pañcabhūta) consists of half of the corresponding subtle element and four fractions from each of the other four subtle elements. Accordingly, each gross element has a five fold composition. It was also assumed that this process of division and recombination goes on till the gross elements are produced as a continuous unending process, with the processes of Srishti ("creation"), Stithi ("sustenance"), and Samhara ("dissolution") continuing without change or interruption.

Pancikarana involves one half of the original subtle element to be mixed up with 1/8 part each of the other original subtle elements to produce the gross element of the subtle element contributing its own one half. When gross elements are produced then consciousness enters into these elements as their presiding deities, then comes the feeling of egoism (I-ness) identifying with the body. Gross elements solidify and assume forms as per their fundamental qualities.

== See also ==
- Namarupa-vyakarana
