= Aditya Nath Jha =

Indian civil servant (1911–1972)

- Born: 18 August 1911; Ayachi Nagar, Sarisab Pahi, Madhubani District, Bihar
- Died: 1972
- Occupation: ICS Officer
- Awards: Padma Vibhushan

Aditya Nath Jha (18 August 1911 – 1972) of the Indian Civil Service (ICS) was the recipient of the Padma Vibhushan in 1972 in the civil services category. He belonged to the 1936 batch of the ICS.

Jha was the son of Sir Ganganath Jha, and the brother of Shri Amarnath Jha, a scholar of English and Sanskrit and former vice-chancellor of Allahabad University. Educated at Allahabad University, he entered the ICS on 16 September 1936, completing his ICS probationary training at Jesus College, Oxford. He served in the United Provinces as an assistant magistrate and collector before transferring to the Indian Political Service in November 1939. At the time of independence, he was secretary to the Resident for the Eastern Princely States.

Post-independence, Jha served as Chief Secretary of Uttar Pradesh, as the first director of the LBSNAA ie the then National Academy of Administration, Mussoorie, Secretary to the Government of India and first Lieutenant Governor of Delhi.

Jha was known for his administrative acumen and his wide-ranging knowledge of cultures and languages. Descended from a family of Sanskrit scholars, Jha was a fluent Sanskrit speaker. While serving as Chief Secretary of Uttar Pradesh he was also concurrently Vice Chancellor of the Sanskrit University in Varanasi.

== Early life and education ==
Jha was son of Ganganath Jha and brother of Amarnath Jha who had been the Vice Chancellor of the Allahabad University, and then the Chairman of the Bihar Civil Service Commission.

He was educated at Allahabad University and Jesus College, Oxford. He served as Vice Chancellor of the Sanskrit University, Benares. He wrote a book on Indian philosophy titled ‘'Bharatiya Darshanon ka Samanvay. He was an avid tennis player both in India and at Oxford University, where he was an ICS probationer. He joined as an Indian Civil Service (ICS) officer in 1936.

He served as Assistant Magistrate and Collector before transferring to the Indian Political Service in 1939. At the time of Independence, he was serving as secretary to the Resident for the Eastern Princely States.

There is a story about Jha’s (who was very tall but grossly overweight even in his youth) appearance before the interview board of the ICS. He was asked whether, because of his enormous bulk, it would be difficult for him to do horse riding, which was compulsory for ICS trainees. Jha, with his characteristic wit, asked if the interview board was worried about his ability to ride the horse or about the poor horse! Members of the board burst into laughter. Naturally, Jha was apprehensive about the result, but when they were announced, he was at the top of the merit list.

== Tenure as Director, National Academy of Administration ==
He was selected as the Director of Academy by former Home Secretary of India, Shri B. N. Jha. He contributed multiple books on philosophy and literature to the library (the famous Gandhi Smriti Library) at academy.

Aditya Nath Jha used to take only a few special classes with the probationers, and his lectures, on any subject — be it public administration or any other subject of general interest — were simply delightful to hear. One learnt a lot from his lectures and wished he could take more classes. One day, a fellow probationer asked him why he was not taking more classes, as he knew such a lot on a variety of subjects. Jha replied with his usual wit that he was the captain of the ship of the training academy, and if the captain of the ship was seen to be working vigorously when the ship was afloat on the high seas, obviously an impression would be created that the ship was in danger!

== External links and books ==
- pp. 30–31 Without Fear or Favour-An autobiography, Joginder Singh, Fusion Books, 2005.
- pp. 30–31 an excerpt from the book From Powerless Village to Union Power Secretary, an autobiography by P. Abraham, Concept Pub. Co., 2009
- pp. 30–31 Without Fear or Favour-An autobiography, Joginder Singh, Fusion Books, 2005
