= Anyonyābhāva =

Abhāva

Anyonyābhāva, is one of the four Abhāvas. According to Acharya Samant Bhadra, as related in Aptamimansa, the absence (non-existence) of the present modification of one particular matter substance in the present modification of any other matter substance is called Anyonyābhāva, e.g. the present bitter taste of lemon is not present in the present sweetness of sugar.
