= Paramanu =

Concept of ultimate atom in Indian philosophy

परमाणु
- Ultimate atom

Classification
- Indivisible, indestructible and eternal part of bhuta

Existence
- Gunas: Eternal
- Principle: Akāraṇavat

Concept
- Founder: Maharshi Kanada
- Text: Vaisheshika

Paramanu is a Sanskrit word used in the Vaisheshika school of thought in Indian philosophy to denote that part of a substance which is indivisible, indestructible and eternal. In other words, the eternal form of the four dravyas prithvi, jal, tejas and vayu is called Paramanu.

== Etymology ==
Paramanu is a Sanskrit compound word having two terms Parama and Anu. The literal meaning of the Sanskrit term Parama is ultimate. Similarly the literal meaning of the term Anu is smallest particle. Anu is the Sanskrit term used for denoting atom. Thus the literal meaning of the compound Sanskrit word paramanu is ultimate atom or "sub-atom".

== Description ==
In the Vaisheshika school, all the substances of the universe are categorised into seven padarthas. They are dravya, guna, karma, samanya, vishesha, samvaaya and abhava.

The synthesis of action is called dravya. There are nine dravyas. They are prithvi, jal, tejas, vayu, aakasha, kaal, dika, atman and manas. The gunas reside in dravya. The four dravyas prithvi, jal, tejas and vayu have two forms. These two forms are nitya (eternal) and anitya (non eternal). The nitya (eternal) form of these four dravyas is called as paramanu. The collective term used for these four dravyas along with aakasha is bhuta. Paramanu is that smallest part of these bhutas which is indivisible, indestructible and whose existence is eternal. Their eternal existence is Akāraṇavat.

The anitya (non eternal) form of these four bhutas is called as Karya.

== Jainism ==
In Jainism it is one of the two types of Pudgala (matter), the other being Skandha. It also helps to define smallest measure of space. All the Parmanus occupy exactly same amount of space. The measure of the space occupied by one Parmanu is called Pradesha.
