= Pancha Bhuta =

Five basic elements in Hinduism

Pancha Bhuta (Sanskrit: पञ्चभूत; pañca bhūta), five elements, is a group of five basic elements, which, in Hinduism, is the basis of all cosmic creation. These elements are: Prithvi (Sanskrit: पृथ्वी:, Earth), Ap (Sanskrit: आपः, Water), Agni (Sanskrit: अग्नि, Fire), Vayu (Sanskrit: वायु:, Air), Akasha (Sanskrit: आकाश, Aether). In Ayurveda and Indian philosophy, the human body is made of these five elements. However, the Chārvāka system of materialism did not accept Akasha as a basic element as it is not tangible and they accepted that there are only four basic elements. Hinduism influenced Buddhism, which accepts only four Mahābhūtas, viewing Akasha as a derived (upādā) element. These five elements of the Indian cosmological system are static or innate, in comparison to five elements, or phases, of the transformational theory used within China's Wuxing philosophy.

== Description ==
The Pancha Bhutas are the basic elements that make up all living organisms on Earth or anywhere else in the Universe. Below table gives a reference on what component of the human body is associated with these elements. Each of the five fingers in humans is also associated with a particular element, so this means the energy associated with the appropriate element can be channelized through various hand mudras.

Bhuta (Element)	Human Body Component	Associated Finger	Associated consort	Characteristic principle	Sense Organs
Agni (Fire)	Fire	Thumb	Svaha	Sight	Eyes
Vayu (Air)	Air	Index Finger	Bharati	Touch	Skin
Akasha (Aether)	Aether	Middle Finger	Akasha	Sound	Ears
Prithvi (Earth)	Earth	Ring Finger	Prithvi	Smell	Nose
Apas (Water)	Water	Little Finger	Varuni	Taste	Tongue

== Ayurveda ==
According to Ayurveda and Yoga, Pancha Bhuta are associated with overall health of human being. Any disorder in human body indicates imbalance of one or more of these elements. Yoga Tattva Mudra Vijnana relates these five elements to five fingers of human being. Different Mudra were developed to balance these in human body which form the Hasta Mudra in yogic tradition and are used in Naturopathy.

The three dosha- three intrinsic tendencies, which, according to Ayurveda are intrinsic in every human being, are representation of combination of these five elements in human body. The three dosha have subtle positive essences which control the mind and body function.

Dosha	Bhuta Composition	Characteristic
Vata	Vayu, Akasha	Prana
Pitta	Agni, Apas	Tejas
Kapha	Prithvi, Apas	Ojas

== Yogic view ==
According to Yoga, the aim of sadhana is to have mastery over oneself. This mastery can be achieved by mastering all the basic elements. The process of gaining mastery over these elements and purifying them is called Bhuta Shuddhi.

Pancha Bhuta Sthalam is representation of Pancha Bhuta for yogic practice. People used to move from one temple to another and do sadhana on particular basic element.

The seven Chakras in the human subtle body are associated with these five elements.

Chakra	Bhuta	Characteristic
Muladhara Chakra	Prithvi	Stability, Support
Svadhishthana Chakra	Apas	Joy, Well-being
Manipura Chakra	Agni	Wisdom, Power
Anahata Chakra	Vayu	Compassion
Vishuddha Chakra	Akasha	Trust, Creativity
Ajna Chakra	Akasha	Knowledge, Intuition, Dignity
Sahasrara Chakra	Akasha	Oneness

== Hasta Mudras ==
Hasta Mudra or hand posture is based on the panch Bhutas. The basic assumption is that all the five elements can be represented by five different fingers in human body as shown in the table below.

Finger Name	Bhuta
Kanishthika, Little Finger	Apas
Anamika, Ring Finger	Prithvi
Madhyama, Middle Finger	Akasha
Tarjani, Index Finger	Vayu
Angustha, Thumb	Agni

== Vastu ==
Vastu shastra emphasizes on the placement of five elements in specified direction and the balance of these elements determines the condition of the associated structure.

Bhuta	Associated Direction	Characteristics
Akasha	East	Expansion, enhancement
Vayu	West	Movements, joy, happiness
Agni	South	Power, confidence, fame
Apas	North	Spirituality, ideas, thoughts, healing
Prithvi	Center, Diagonal	Stability, peace and harmony

These correlations are used to define an ideal home: The house itself is placed so that maximum load and weight is in the southwest area of the plot. Thus, there is maximum open space in the north and east sides of the plot, satisfying Vayu/air and Akasha/aether. The main gate, the verandah and the main door are in the northeast of the house; south of the verandah the main living room, and south of that one or two bedrooms. The kitchen is placed in the southeast corner of the house, to balance Akasha and Agni.

== Taste ==
Pancha Bhuta is associated with six human tastes/rasas as below.

Taste/Rasa	Associated Bhuta
Madhura/Sweet	Jala, Prithvi (Earth and Water)
Amla/Sour	Prithvi, Agni (Earth and Fire)
Lavana/Salty	Jala, Agni (Water and Fire)
Katu/Bitter	Akasha, Agni (Aether and Fire)
Tikta/Pungent	Agni, Vayu (Fire and Air)
Kashaya/Astringent	Vayu, Prithvi (Air and Earth)

== See also ==
- Pancha Bhuta Sthalam
- Classical element
- Mahābhūta
- Tanmatras
- Mudra
- Mahat-tattva
