= Vaisheshika =

Ancient Indian philosophy

Vaisheshika (IAST: Vaiśeṣika; /vaɪˈʃɛʂɪkə/; Sanskrit: वैशेषिक) is one of the six schools of Hindu philosophy from ancient India. In its early stages, Vaiśeṣika was an independent philosophy with its own metaphysics, epistemology, logic, ethics, and soteriology. Over time, the Vaiśeṣika system became similar in its philosophical procedures, ethical conclusions and soteriology to the Nyāya school of Hinduism, but retained its difference in epistemology and metaphysics.

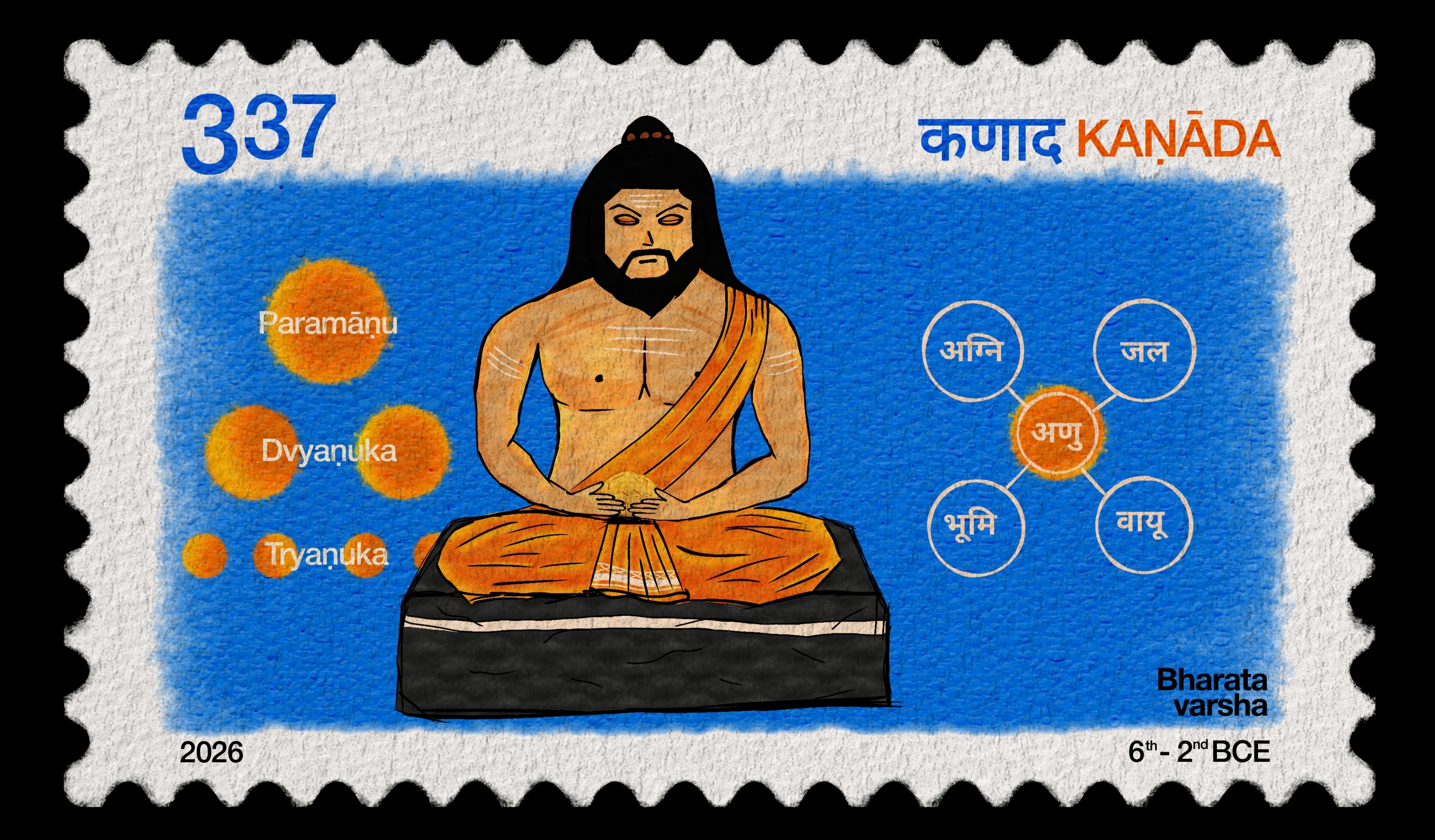
Illustration of the atomic theory of Acharya Kanada showing Paramāṇu, Dvyaṇuka, and Tryaṇuka concepts from the Vaisheshika philosophy.

The epistemology of the Vaiśeṣika school of Hinduism, like Buddhism, accepted only two reliable means to knowledge: direct observation and inference. The Vaiśeṣika school and Buddhism both consider their respective scriptures as indisputable and valid means to knowledge, the difference being that the scriptures held to be a valid and reliable source by Vaiśeṣikas were the Vedas.

The Vaiśeṣika school is known for its insights in naturalism, a form of atomism in natural philosophy. It postulated that all objects in the physical universe are reducible to paramāṇu (atoms), and one's experiences are derived from the interplay of substance (a function of atoms, their number and their spatial arrangements), quality, activity, commonness, particularity and inherence. Everything was composed of atoms, qualities emerged from aggregates of atoms, but the aggregation and nature of these atoms was predetermined by cosmic forces. The Ājīvika and Trairāśika schools of Jainism also included a concept of atoms; however, their ideas were similar to each other but different from and less developed than that of the Vaisheshika school.

According to the Vaiśeṣika school, knowledge and liberation were achievable by a complete understanding of the world of experience.

Vaiśeṣika darshana was founded by Kaṇāda Kashyapa around the 6th to 2nd century BC.

== Overview ==
The name Vaiśeṣika derives from viśeṣa, the category that represents the individuality of innumerable existing objects.

Although the Vaiśeṣika system developed independently from the Nyāya philosophy of Hinduism, the two became similar and are often studied together. However, in its classical form, the Vaiśeṣika school differed from Nyāya in a significant way: where Nyāya accepted four sources of valid knowledge, the Vaiśeṣika accepted only two.

The epistemology of Vaiśeṣika school of Hinduism accepted only two reliable means to knowledge – perception and inference.

Vaiśeṣika espouses a form of atomism, that the reality is composed of five substances (examples are earth, water, air, fire, and space). Each of these five are of two types, explains Ganeri: paramāṇu and composite. A paramāṇu is that which is indestructible, indivisible, and has a special kind of dimension, called "small" (aṇu). A composite is that which is divisible into paramāṇu. Whatever human beings perceive is composite, and even the smallest perceptible thing, namely, a fleck of dust, has parts, which are therefore invisible. The Vaiśeṣikas visualized the smallest composite thing as a "triad" (tryaṇuka) with three parts, each part with a "dyad" (dyaṇuka). Vaiśeṣikas believed that a dyad has two parts, each of which is an atom. Size, form, truths and everything that human beings experience as a whole is a function of parmanus, their number and their spatial arrangements.

Parama means "most distant, remotest, extreme, last" and aṇu means "atom, very small particle", hence paramāṇu is essentially "the most distant or last small (i.e. smallest) particle".

Vaiśeṣika postulated that what one experiences is derived from dravya (substance: a function of atoms, their number and their spatial arrangements), guna (quality), karma (activity), samanya (commonness), vishesha (particularity) and samavaya (inherence, inseparable connectedness of everything).

The followers of this philosophy are mostly Shaivas. Haribhadra Suri, in his work Ṣaḍdarśanasamuccaya describes the followers of Vaiśeṣika as worshippers of Pashupati or Shiva.

== Development ==
=== Foundational text ===
The earliest systematic exposition of the Vaiśeṣika is found in the Vaiśeṣika Sūtra of Kaṇāda (or Kaṇabhakṣa). Kaṇāda is also referred to as Ulūka by Ci-tsan, a Chinese Buddhist commentator. This treatise is divided into ten books.

=== Commentaries ===
The two commentaries on the Vaiśeṣika Sūtra, Rāvaṇabhāṣya and Bhāradvājavṛtti are no more extant. Praśastapāda’s Padārthadharmasaṁgraha (c. 4th century) is the next important work of this school. Though commonly known as bhāṣya of Vaiśeṣika Sūtra, this treatise is basically an independent work on the subject. The next Vaisheshika treatise, Candra's Daśapadārthaśāstra (648) based on Praśastapāda’s treatise is available only in Chinese translation. The earliest commentary available on Praśastapāda’s treatise is Vyomaśiva’s Vyomavatī (8th century). The other three commentaries are Śridhara’s Nyāyakandalī (991), Udayana's Kiranāvali (10th century) and Śrivatsa’s Līlāvatī (11th century). Śivāditya’s Saptapadārthī which also belongs to the same period, presents the Nyāya and the Vaiśeṣika principles as a part of one whole. Śaṁkara Miśra’s Upaskara on Vaiśeṣika Sūtra is also an important work.

== Metaphysics ==
=== Categories or Padārtha ===
According to the Vaisheshika school, all things that exist, that can be cognized and named are padārthas (literal meaning: the meaning of a word), the objects of experience. All objects of experience can be classified into six categories, dravya (substance), guṇa (quality), karma (activity), sāmānya (generality), viśeṣa (particularity) and samavāya (inherence). Later Vaiśeṣikas (Śrīdhara and Udayana and Śivāditya) added one more category abhava (non-existence). The first three categories are defined as artha (which can perceived) and they have real objective existence. The last three categories are defined as budhyapekṣam (product of intellectual discrimination) and they are logical categories.

1. Dravya (substance): There are nine substances. They are, pṛthvī (earth), ap (water), tejas (fire), vāyu (air), ākaśa (ether), kāla (time), dik (space), ātman (self or soul) and manas (mind). The first five are called bhūtas, the substances having some specific qualities so that they could be perceived by one or the other external senses.
2. Guṇa (quality): The Vaiśeṣika Sūtra mentions 17 guṇas (qualities), to which Praśastapāda added another 7. While a substance is capable of existing independently by itself, a guṇa (quality) cannot exist so. The original 17 guṇas (qualities) are, rūpa (colour), rasa (taste), gandha (smell), sparśa (touch), saṁkhyā (number), parimāṇa (size/dimension/quantity), pṛthaktva (individuality), saṁyoga (conjunction/accompaniments), vibhāga (disjunction), paratva (priority), aparatva (posteriority), buddhi (knowledge), sukha (pleasure), duḥkha (pain), icchā (desire), dveṣa (aversion) and prayatna (effort). To these Praśastapāda added gurutva (heaviness), dravatva (fluidity), sneha (viscosity), dharma (merit), adharma (demerit), śabda (sound) and saṁskāra (faculty).
3. Karma (activity): The karmas (activities) like guṇas (qualities) have no separate existence, they belong to the substances. But while a quality is a permanent feature of a substance, an activity is a transient one. Ākāśa (ether), kāla (time), dik (space) and ātman (self), though substances, are devoid of karma (activity).
4. Sāmānya (generality): Since there are plurality of substances, there will be relations among them. When a property is found common to many substances, it is called sāmānya.
5. Viśeṣa (particularity): By means of viśeṣa, we are able to perceive substances as different from one another. As the ultimate atoms are innumerable so are the viśeṣas.
6. Samavāya (inherence): Kaṇāda defined samavāya as the relation between the cause and the effect. Praśastapāda defined it as the relationship existing between the substances that are inseparable, standing to one another in the relation of the container and the contained. The relation of samavāya is not perceivable but only inferable from the inseparable connection of the substances.
7. Abhava (non-existence)

=== Atomism ===
According to the Vaiśeṣika school, a paramanu (atom) is an indestructible particle of matter. The atom is indivisible because it is a state at which no measurement can be attributed. They used invariance arguments to determine properties of the atoms. It also stated that anu can have two states—absolute rest and a state of motion.

They postulated four different kinds of atoms: two with mass, and two without. Each substance is supposed to consist of all four kinds of atoms. Atoms can be combined into tryaṇukas (triads) and dvyaṇuka (dyad)before they aggregate into bodies of a kind that can be perceived. Each paramāṇu (atom) possesses its own distinct viśeṣa (individuality)

The measure of the partless atoms is known as parimaṇḍala parimāṇa. It is eternal and it cannot generate the measure of any other substance. Its measure is its own absolutely.

== Epistemology ==
Six pramāṇas (epistemically reliable means to accurate knowledge and to truths) are noted within different Indian philosophical schools: Pratyakṣa (perception), Anumāna (inference), Śabda or āgama "(word, testimony of past or present reliable experts), Upamāna (comparison and analogy), Arthāpatti (postulation, derivation from circumstances), and Anupalabdhi (non-perception, negative/cognitive proof). Of these Vaiśeṣika epistemology considered only pratyakṣa (perception) and anumāna (inference) as reliable means of valid knowledge. Yoga accepts the first three of these six as pramāṇa; and the Nyaya school, related to Vaiśeṣika, accepts the first four out of these six.

- Pratyakṣa (प्रत्यक्ष) means perception. It is of two types: external and internal. External perception is described as that arising from the interaction of five senses and worldly objects, while internal perception is described by this school as that of inner sense, the mind. The ancient and medieval texts of Hinduism identify four requirements for correct perception: Indriyarthasannikarsa (direct experience by one's sensory organ(s) with the object, whatever is being studied), Avyapadesya (non-verbal; correct perception is not through hearsay, according to ancient Indian scholars, where one's sensory organ relies on accepting or rejecting someone else's perception), Avyabhicara (does not wander; correct perception does not change, nor is it the result of deception because one's sensory organ or means of observation is drifting, defective, suspect) and Vyavasayatmaka (definite; correct perception excludes judgments of doubt, either because of one's failure to observe all the details, or because one is mixing inference with observation and observing what one wants to observe, or not observing what one does not want to observe). Some ancient scholars proposed "unusual perception" as pramāṇa and called it internal perception, a proposal contested by other Indian scholars. The internal perception concepts included pratibha (intuition), samanyalaksanapratyaksa (a form of induction from perceived specifics to a universal), and jnanalaksanapratyaksa (a form of perception of prior processes and previous states of a 'topic of study' by observing its current state). Further, the texts considered and refined rules of accepting uncertain knowledge from Pratyakṣa-pranama, so as to contrast nirnaya (definite judgment, conclusion) from anadhyavasaya (indefinite judgment).
- Anumāna (अनुमान) means inference. It is described as reaching a new conclusion and truth from one or more observations and previous truths by applying reason. Observing smoke and inferring fire is an example of Anumana. In all except one Hindu philosophies, this is a valid and useful means to knowledge. The method of inference is explained by Indian texts as consisting of three parts: pratijna (hypothesis), hetu (a reason), and drshtanta (examples). The hypothesis must further be broken down into two parts, state the ancient Indian scholars: sadhya (that idea which needs to proven or disproven) and paksha (the object on which the sadhya is predicated). The inference is conditionally true if sapaksha (positive examples as evidence) are present, and if vipaksha (negative examples as counter-evidence) are absent. For rigor, the Indian philosophies also state further epistemic steps. For example, they demand Vyapti - the requirement that the hetu (reason) must necessarily and separately account for the inference in "all" cases, in both sapaksha and vipaksha. A conditionally proven hypothesis is called a nigamana (conclusion).

=== Syllogism ===
The syllogism of the Vaiśeṣika school was similar to that of the Nyāya school of Hinduism, but the names given by Praśastapāda to the 5 members of syllogism are different.

== See also ==
- Darshanas
- Hindu philosophy
- Hinduism
- Nyaya (philosophy)
- Padārtha
- Tarka-Sangraha
- Kaṇāda
- Vaiśeṣika Sūtra
- Atomism
- Padārtha
- Nyaya#Sixteen categories (padārthas)
- Categories (Aristotle)

== Sources ==
- Basham, Arthur Llewellyn (1951). History and Doctrines of the Ajivikas, a Vanished Indian Religion. Motilal Banarsidass. ISBN 978-81-208-1204-8.
- Chattopadhyaya, D. (1986), Indian Philosophy: A Popular Introduction, People's Publishing House, New Delhi, ISBN 81-7007-023-6.
- Dasgupta, Surendranath (1975), A History of Indian Philosophy, Vol. I, Motilal Banarsidass, Delhi, ISBN 978-81-208-0412-8.
- Fowler, Jeaneane D. (2002). Perspectives of Reality: An Introduction to the Philosophy of Hinduism. Sussex Academic Press. ISBN 978-1-898723-93-6.
- Radhakrishnan, S. (2006), Indian Philosophy, Vol. II, Oxford University Press, New Delhi, ISBN 0-19-563820-4.
