= Ayachi Mishra =

Indian Philosopher

Mahamahopadhyaya Ayachi Mishra
- अयाची मिश्र

Personal life
- Born: Bhavanatha Ayachi Mishra Dih, Sarisab Pahi village, Madhubani district
- Children: Sankara Mishra
- Era: 14th century CE
- Region: Mithila region
- Education: Ancient Mithila University
- Other name: Bhavanatha Mishra

Religious life
- Religion: Hinduism
- Creed: Nyaya Shastra

Ayachi Mishra (Sanskrit: अयाची मिश्र) was an Indian Vedic scholar during the 14th century in Mithila. His real name was Bhavanatha Mishra. He was an eminent scholar of the Nyaya Shastra in the Indian philosophy. The Nyaya Shastra also known as Indian Logic is one of the six schools of thought in the Indian philosophy.

== Etymology ==
Ayachi is a Sanskrit adjective word. The Hindi word of Ayachi is Ayachaka having literal meanings non-asking, prosperous or rich. According to legend, it is said that the scholar Bhavanatha Mishra never asked anything with anyone in his life. He was very committed to his words and promises given to anyone. It is said that due to his ideal qualities of renunciation and commitment to his words, he was later called as Ayachi and became famous with his new name Ayachi Mishra.

== Early life ==
Ayachi Mishra was born in a Maithil Brahmin family at Sarisab Pahi village of the Madhubani district in the Mithila region of Bihar, India.

== Later life ==
Bhavanatha Mishra later became the eminent scholar of the Nyaya Shastra in the Indian philosophy. He spent his entire life on only one and a half katthas of land at Sarisab Pahi village in the Madhubani district of the Mithila region in Bihar, India. The place where he lived in the village is presently called as Ayachi Mishra Dih which has been recognised and preserved as a historical place by the Government of Bihar. He taught his disciples without taking an fees. According to legend, it is said that in Gurudakshina, he only asked his disciples to teach at least ten students. He also taught his own son Sankara Mishra who wrote nineteen books based on his teaching.
