= Amarnath Jha =

Vice-Chancellor of Banaras Hindu University

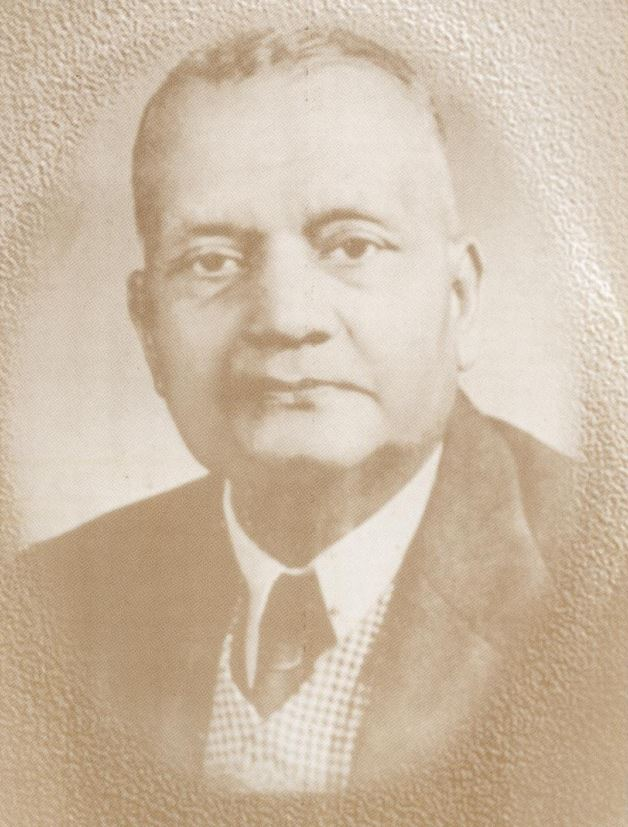

5th Vice-Chancellor of Banaras Hindu University
- In office 27 February 1948 – 5 December 1948
- Appointed by: Lord Mountbatten
- Preceded by: Sir Sarvepalli Radhakrishnan
- Succeeded by: Pandit Govind Malaviya

Personal details
- Awards: Padma Bhushan

Amaranath Jha (25 February 1897 – 2 September 1955) was the Vice Chancellor (VC) of the University of Allahabad and the Banaras Hindu University. He was the son of Mahamahopadhyay Dr. Sir Ganganath Jha, a great scholar of Sanskrit Amaranath Jha was reputed as the ablest professor of English literature in India of his time. He was Head of the Department of English at the University of Allahabad for a long time, being appointed to the post at the young age of thirty-two. In 1938 he became Vice-Chancellor of the Allahabad University ie six years after his father relinquished the office of Vice Chancellor of University of Allahabad and then became Vice Chancellor of the Banaras Hindu University in succession to Dr. Radhakrishnan. He worked as Vice Chairman of the committee for the project leading to the establishment of the National Defence Academy. He was one amongst eminent dignitaries associated with the Rashtriya Sanskrit Sanstahan, Allahabad. He became Chairman of Uttar Pradesh Public Service Commission and thereafter he became Chairman of the Bihar Public Service Commission (1 April 1953 – 1 September 1955).

== Honours ==
In 1910-11 the Muir Hostel was constructed. Allahabad University renamed it as "Amarnath Jha Hostel" to pay him regards. hostels' history say that Dr. Amarnath Jha as Vice-Chancellor of the University of Allahabad was himself also the warden of the Muir Hostel. He was among the first recipients of the civilian honour of Padma Bhushan (1954).

== Personal life ==
Dr. Amarnath Jha was born in a Maithil Shrotriya Brahmin family of Mithila ( Sarisab-Pahi ) in Bihar. He died at an early age of fifty nine on 2 September 1955 at Patna. Dr. Amarnath Jha was a great scholar, a good orator and an academic administrator par excellence. In 1920, he edited the 15th century's famous Sanskrit literature text "Rasarnava" written by the eminent Sanskrit scholar Sankara Mishra.
