= Vaiśeṣika Sūtra =

Foundational text of the Vaisheshika school of Hindu philosophy

Vaiśeṣika Sūtra (Sanskrit: वैशेषिक सूत्र), also called Kaṇāda Sūtra (कणाद सूत्र), is an ancient Sanskrit text at the foundation of the Vaisheshika school of Hindu philosophy. The sutra was authored by the Hindu sage Kanada, also known as Kashyapa.

Statue of Maharshi Kanada (Composer of the Vaiśeṣika Sūtra) at the entrance of the Uchchaith Bhagwati Mandir in Mithila.

According to some scholars, he flourished before the advent of Buddhism because the Vaiśeṣika Sūtra makes no mention of Buddhism or Buddhist doctrines; however, the details of Kanada's life are uncertain, and the Vaiśeṣika Sūtra was likely compiled sometime between 6th and 2nd century BCE, and finalized in the currently existing version before the start of the common era.

A number of scholars have commented on it since the beginning of common era; the earliest commentary known is the Padartha Dharma Sangraha of Prashastapada. Another important secondary work on Vaiśeṣika Sūtra is Maticandra's Dasha padartha sastra which exists both in Sanskrit and its Chinese translation in 648 CE by Yuanzhuang.

The Vaiśeṣika Sūtra is written in aphoristic sutras style, and presents its theories on the creation and existence of the universe using naturalistic atomism, applying logic and realism, and is one of the earliest known systematic realist ontology in human history. The text discusses motions of different kind and laws that govern it, the meaning of dharma, a theory of epistemology, the basis of Atman (self, soul), and the nature of yoga and moksha. The explicit mention of motion as the cause of all phenomena in the world and several propositions about it make it one of the earliest texts on physics.

== Etymology ==
The name Vaiśeṣika Sūtra (Sanskrit: वैशेषिक सूत्र) is derived from viśeṣa, विशेष, which means "particularity", that is to be contrasted from "universality". The classes particularity and universality belong to different categories of experience.

== Manuscripts ==
Till the 1950s, only one manuscript of Vaiseshika sutra was known and this manuscript called as Upaskara was part of a bhasya by the 15th century philosopher Sankara Mishra from the Mithila region. Scholars had doubted its authenticity, given the inconsistencies in this manuscript and the quotes in other Hindu, Jaina and Buddhist literature claiming to be from the Vaisheshika Sutra. In the 1950s and early 1960s, new manuscripts of Vaiśeṣika Sūtra were discovered in distant parts of India, which were later identified as this Sutra. These newer manuscripts are quite different, more consistent with the historical literature, and suggests that, like other major texts and scriptures of Hinduism, Vaiśeṣika Sūtra too suffered interpolations, errors in transmission and distortion over time. A critical edition of the Vaiśeṣika Sūtra is now available.

== Date ==
The Vaisheshika Sutras mention the doctrines of competing schools of Indian philosophy such as Samkhya and Mimamsa, but make no mention of Buddhism, which has led scholars in more recent publications to posit estimates of 6th to 2nd century BCE.

The critical edition studies of Vaisheshika Sutras manuscripts discovered after 1950, suggest that the text attributed to Kanada existed in a finalized form sometime between 200 BCE and the start of the common era, with the possibility that its key doctrines are much older. Multiple Hindu texts dated to the 1st and 2nd century CE, such as the Mahavibhasa and Jnanaprasthana from the Kushan Empire, quote and comment on Kanada's doctrines. Although the Vaisheshika Sutras makes no mention of the doctrines of Jainism and Buddhism, their ancient texts mention Vaisheshika Sutras doctrines and use its terminology, particularly Buddhism's Sarvastivada tradition, as well as the works of Nagarjuna.

== Physics and philosophy ==
Physics is central to Kaṇāda's assertion that all that is knowable is based on motion. His ascribing centrality to physics in the understanding of the universe also follows from his invariance principles. For example, he says that the atom must be spherical since it should be the same in all dimensions. He asserts that all substances are composed of atoms, two of which have mass and two are massless.

The opening sutras

Now an explanation of dharma,
the means to prosperity and salvation is dharma.

— Vaisheshika Sutra, Transl: Klaus Klostermaier

The philosophy in Vaiseshika sutra is atomistic pluralism, states Jayatilleke. Its ideas are known for its contributions to "inductive inference", and often coupled with the "deductive logic" of the sister school of Hinduism called the Nyaya. James Thrower and others call Vaiśeṣika philosophy to be naturalism.

The text states:

- There are nine constituents of realities: four classes of atoms (earth, water, fire and air), space (akasha), time (kāla), direction (disha), infinity of souls (Atman), mind (manas).
- Every object of creation is made of atoms (parmanu). Atoms are eternal, and their combinations constitute the empirical material world.
- Individual souls are eternal and pervade material body for a time.
- There are six categories (padārtha) of experience — substance, quality, activity, generality, particularity, and inherence.

Several traits of substances (dravya) are given as color, taste, smell, touch, number, size, the separate, coupling and uncoupling, priority and posterity, comprehension, pleasure and pain, attraction and revulsion, and wishes. Like many foundational texts of classical schools of Hindu philosophy, God is not mentioned in the sutra, and the text is non-theistic.

== Content ==
Epistemology (pramana) in Vaisheshika.

The critical edition of the Vaisheshika Sutras are divided into ten chapters, each subdivided into two sections called āhnikas: (Note: The later texts of the Vaisesika school expanded and revised some of these ideas, categories and theories, as did scholars of Jainism, Buddhism and other Hinduism schools.)

=== Chapter 1 ===
Kanada opens his Sutra with definitions of Dharma, the importance of the Vedas and his goals. The text, states Matilal, then defines and describes three categories and their causal aspects: substance, quality and action. He explains their differences, similarities and relationships between these three. The second part of first chapter defines and explains a universal, a particular (viśeṣa,) and their hierarchical relationship. Kanada states that it is from combination of particulars that some universals emerge.

=== Chapter 2 ===
The second chapter of the Vaisheshika Sutras presents five substances (earth, air, water, fire, space) each with a distinct quality. Kanada argues that all except "air and space" is verifiable by perception, while existence of invisible air is established by inference (air blows, and that there must be a substance that affects the touch sensation to the skin; space, he argues, is inferred from one's ability to move from one point to another unhindered - a point he revises in later part of the text by asserting that sound is perceived and proves space).

=== Chapter 3 ===
Kanada states his premises about the atman (self, soul) and its validity.

=== Chapter 4 ===
Discussion the body and its adjuncts. In this chapter the concept of Akāraṇavat is introduced.

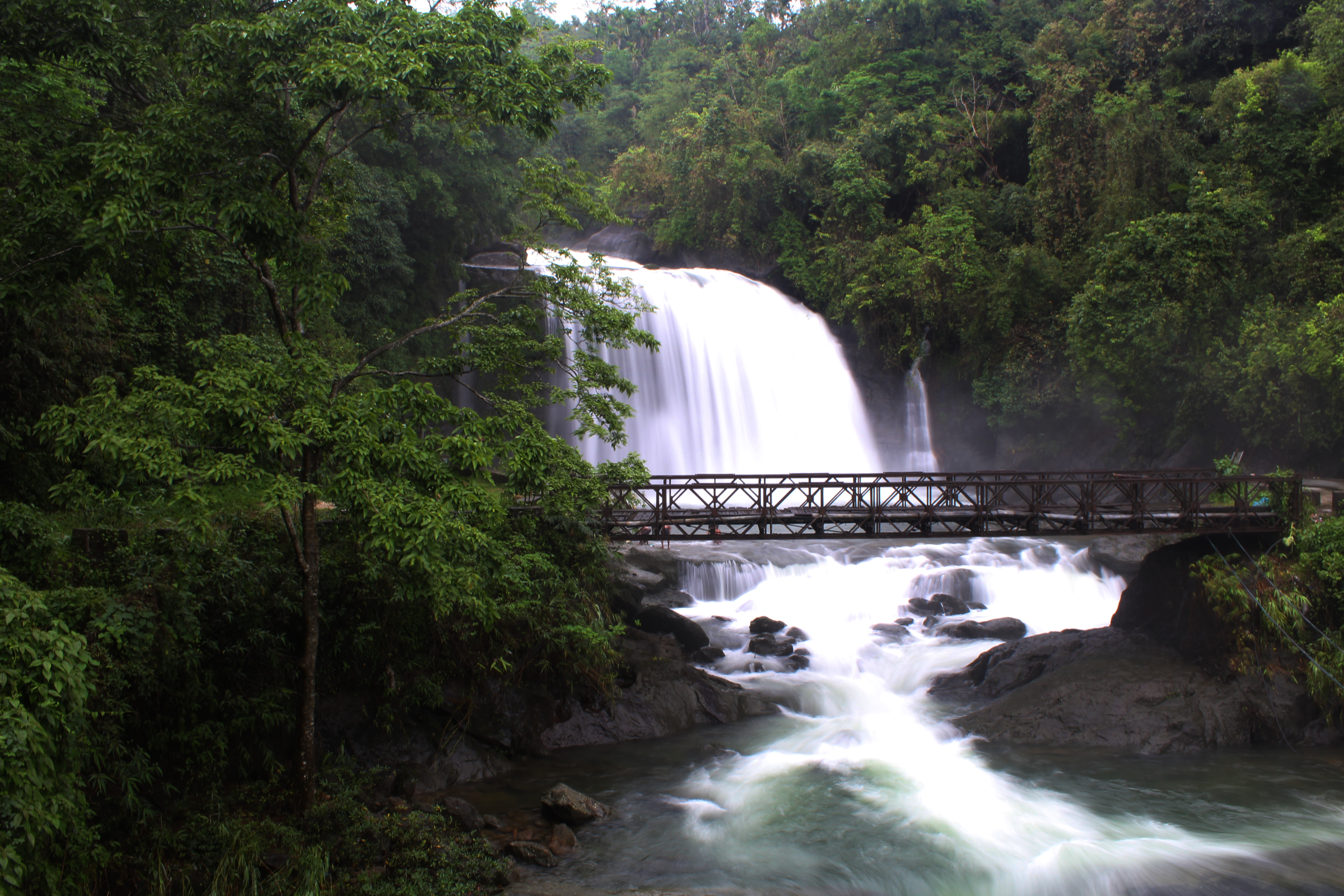
The Vaiśeṣika Sūtra mentions many empirical observations and natural phenomenon such as flow of fluids and motion of magnets, then attempts to explain them with naturalistic theories.

=== Chapter 5 ===
In the fifth chapter action connected with the body and action connected with the mind are investigated. The text defines and discusses Yoga and Moksha, asserting that self-knowledge (atma-saksatkara) is the means to spiritual liberation. In this chapter, Kanada mentions various natural phenomena such as the falling of objects to ground, rising of fire upwards, the growth of grass upwards, the nature of rainfall and thunderstorms, the flow of liquids, the movement towards a magnet among many others; he then attempts to integrate his observations with his theories, and classifies phenomenon into two: those caused by volition, and those caused by subject-object conjunctions.

=== Chapter 6 ===
In the sixth chapter puṇya (virtue) and pāpa (sin) are examined both as moral precepts and as discussed in the Vedas and Upanishads.

=== Chapter 7 ===
In the seventh chapter discusses qualities such as color and taste as a function of heat, time, object and subject. Kanada dedicates a significant number of Sutras to his theory and importance of measurement.

=== Chapter 8 ===
In the eighth chapter, Kanada dwells on nature of cognition and reality, arguing that cognition is a function of the object (substance) and subject. Some sutras are unclear, such as one on Artha, which Kanada states is applicable only to "substance, quality and action" per his chapter one.

=== Chapter 9 ===
Kanada discusses epistemology, particularly the nature of perception, inference and human reasoning process.

=== Chapter 10 ===
The final chapter focuses on the soul, its attributes and its threefold causes. Kanada asserts that human happiness and suffering is linked to ignorance, confusion and knowledge of the soul. He develops his theories of efficient cause, karma, body, mind, cognition and memory to present his thesis. He mentions meditation as a means of soul knowledge.

== Bibliography ==
- Cowell, E. B.; Gough, A. E. (1882). The Sarva-Darsana-Samgraha by Madhvacharya: Trubner's Oriental Series. Taylor & Francis (2001 Reprint). ISBN 978-0-415-24517-3.
- Jeaneane D. Fowler (2002). Perspectives of Reality: An Introduction to the Philosophy of Hinduism. Sussex Academic Press. ISBN 978-1-898723-93-6.
- Subhash Kak (2016), Matter and Mind: The Vaiśeṣika Sūtra of Kaṇāda ISBN 9781988207148
- H. Margenau (2012). Physics and Philosophy: Selected Essays. Springer Science. ISBN 978-94-009-9845-2.
- Bimal Krishna Matilal (1977). Nyāya-Vaiśeṣika. Otto Harrassowitz Verlag. ISBN 978-3-447-01807-4.
- Bart Labuschagne; Timo Slootweg (2012). Hegel's Philosophy of the Historical Religions. BRILL Academic. ISBN 978-90-04-22618-0.
- O'Flaherty, Wendy Doniger. Textual Sources for the Study of Hinduism (Textual Sources for the Study of Religion). ISBN 0226618471.
