= Upaskara =

Commentary on Vaisheshika Sutra

- Author: Sankara Mishra
- Original title: उपस्कर
- Language: Sanskrit
- Subject: Vaisheshika Sutra
- Genre: Commentary on Vaisheshika Sutra
- Published: 15th Century CE
- Publication place: India
- Preceded by: Ayachi Mishra

Upaskara (Sanskrit: उपस्कर) (Romanised: Upaskāra) is a commentary on the Kanada's Vaisheshika Sutra of the Indian philosophy. It was written in the Sanskrit language by the Indian philosopher Sankara Mishra of Mithila.

== Background ==
Sankara Mishra learnt the Vaisheshika Sutra from his father Bhavanatha Mishra also known as Ayachi Mishra orally. Then he composed a Sanskrit commentary text on the Vaisheshika Sutra of the ancient Vedic sage Kanada. This commentary text is known as Upaskara.

== Description ==
The Sanskrit commentary text Upaskara was composed in the 15th century CE. It is said that the text Upaskara might had been composed before 1462 AD by the Indian philosopher Sankara Mishra. The expressions of Navya Nyaya scholars could be traced in the commentary Upaskara, so it said that without the adequate knowledge of Navya Nyaya Shastra, it is very difficult to understand the text Upaskara.
