= Padārtha =

Ontological categories in Indian philosophy

- Samkhya: Kapila
- Yoga: Patanjali
- Vaisheshika: Kaṇāda, Prashastapada
- Secular: Valluvar

Padārtha is a Sanskrit word for "categories" in Vaisheshika and Nyaya schools of Indian philosophy.

== Etymology ==
The term padārtha is a portmanteau of pada, "word" and artha, "meaning" or "referent", and so the term padārtha indicates "the meaning or referent of words".

== Philosophical significance ==
Almost all of India's philosophical systems accept liberation as life's ultimate goal; it is the summum bonum. Each philosophy prescribes the means to that end independently. According to Aksapada Gautama, liberation can be attained by true knowledge of the categories or padārthas. According to the Vaisheshika school, all things that exist, which can be conceptualized, and that can be named are padārthas, the objects of experience.

== Types ==
=== Vaisheshika ===
According to Vaisheshika, padārtha or objects of experience can be divided as bhāva (real existence) and abhāva (non-existence). The bhāva padārthas are of six types, while abhāva was added later. These are:

- Dravya (substance), an entity having guna and karma
- Guṇa (quality), the substrate of substance, devoid of action
- Karma (activity), transient and dynamic, i.e., upward movement, downward movement, contraction, expansion, and locomotion
- Sāmānya (generality), the classicism of the substances i.e. papa, apara, parapara
- Viśeṣa (particularity)
- Samavāya (inherence)
- abhāva (non-existence), add by later Vaiśeṣikas scholars such as Śrīdhara, Udayana and Śivāditya.

=== Nyaya ===
Nyāya metaphysics recognizes sixteen padārthas, the second of which, called prameya, includes the six (or seven) categories of the Vaiśeṣika school. They are:

1. Pramāṇa (valid means of knowledge)
2. Prameya (objects of valid knowledge)
3. Saṃśaya (doubt)
4. Prayojana (aim)
5. Dṛṣṭānta (example)
6. Siddhānta (conclusion)
7. Avayava (members of syllogism)
8. Tarka (hypothetical reasoning)
9. Nirṇaya (settlement)
10. Vāda (discussion)
11. Jalpa (wrangling)
12. Vitaṇḍā (cavilling)
13. Hetvābhāsa (fallacy)
14. Chala (quibbling)
15. Jāti (sophisticated refutation)
16. Nigrahasthāna (point of defeat)

=== Western philosophy ===
Padārthas are distinct from the categories of Aristotle, Kant, and Hegel. According to Aristotle, categories are logical classification of predicates; Kant states that categories are only patterns of understanding, while Hegel’s categories are dynamic stages in the development of thought. The Vaiśeṣika categories are a metaphysical classification of all knowable objects.

Aristotle accepts ten categories:

- Substance
- Quality
- Quantity
- Relation
- Place
- Time
- Posture
- Property
- Activity
- Passivity

The Vaiśeṣikas instead place the concepts of time and place under substance; relation under quality; inherence, quantity and property under quality. Passivity is considered the opposite of activity. Akṣapāda Gautama enumerates sixteen padārthas.

== See also ==
- Vaisheshika#The Categories or Padārtha
- Nyaya#Sixteen categories (padārthas)
- Categories_(Aristotle)
- Kanada
