= Shankara Mishra =

15th century Indian Vedic Philosopher

Mahamahopadhyaya Sankara Mishra
- शंकर मिश्र

Personal life
- Parent: Bhavanatha Mishra (Ayachi Mishra)
- Era: 15th Century CE
- Region: Mithila region
- Main interest(s): Vaisheshika Sutra, Nyaya Shastra
- Education: Ancient Mithila University
- Known for: Upaskara ( Commentary on Vaisheshika Sutra)
- Other name: Shankara Mishra
- Occupation: Philosopher, Teacher

Religious life
- Religion: Hinduism
- School: Vaisheshika

Sankara Mishra (Sanskrit: शंकर मिश्र), also known as Shankara Mishra, was an Indian Vedic scholar during the 15th century in Mithila. He was a scholar of Vaisheshika school of thought in the Indian philosophy. Vaisheshika philosophy is one of the six schools of the Indian Philosophy.

== Early life ==
Sankara Mishra was born in a Maithil Brahmin family at Sarisab Pahi village of the Madhubani district in the Mithila region of Bihar, India. He was the son of the scholar Ayachi Mishra ( Bhavanatha Mishra) of the Nyaya Shastra. According to legend, it is said that Lord Shiva himself was incarnated as the son of the scholar Ayachi Mishra in the form of Sankara Mishra. It is said that Sankara Mishra introduced his self in Sanskrit Shloka at the court of the king Bhairavasimha of Mithila, when he was only five years old by age.

The Sanskrit Shloka was,

बालोऽहं जगदानन्द नमे बाला सरस्वती।
अपूर्णे पञ्चमे वर्षे वर्णयामि जगत्त्रयम् ।।

The king was influenced by the prodigious poetic talent of the little boy. Then the king imparted a gold necklace to the little boy Sankara Mishra as a reward. After that Ayachi Mishra, the father of the little boy, gifted the gold necklace to the nurse-maid also called as Chamain who helped the mother of the boy during the birth of the boy. It is said that during the birth of Sankara Mishra, his father and mother had no money to gift a reward to the nurse-maid, so they promised the nurse-maid that they would gift their son's first earning as a reward for her service of the maternity. It is also said that the nurse-maid excavated a pond in the village with the cost of the gift of the gold necklace.

== Academic life and scholarship ==
Sankara Mishra in his texts had mentioned that his father Ayachi Mishra had given all the knowledge under the Kantha Vidya tradition. The Kantha Vidya means knowledge through oral recitation. He had mentioned that all texts written by him is the knowledge of his father. He had written the texts by listening the oral recitation from his father's mouth. He had written nineteen books.

Sankara Mishra is well known for his commentary Upaskara on the Vaisheshika Sutra of the Vedic sage Maharshi Kanaada. It is said that he might had composed the commentary text Upaskara before 1462 CE.

Similarly he composed a Sanskrit text known as Rasarnava which is a very famous text in the Sanskrit literature. It was later edited by the scholar Amaranatha Jha in 1920.

Sankara Mishra was awarded with the honorific title Mahamahopadhyaya for his contribution to the Sanskrit literature and the Indian philosophy.
