= Prashastapada =

Ancient Indian philosopher

Praśastapāda (Sanskrit: प्रशस्तपाद) was an ancient Indian philosopher. He wrote the Padārtha-dharma-saṅgraha (Collection of Properties of Matter) and a commentary, titled Praśastapāda Bhāṣya, on the Vaisheshika Sutras of Kanada (circa 2nd century BCE); both texts are comprehensive books in physics. In these texts Prashastapada discusses the properties of motion. Ganganath Jha had translated Praśastapāda Bhāṣya which was published in 1916. Prashasta or Praśasta (Sanskrit: प्रशस्त) means praised or praiseworthy, lauded or laudable, commended or commendable or eulogized.

Dayananda Saraswati writes that the Sutras of Kanāda and Padārthadharmasaṅgraha of Praśastapāda do not show much influence of the Nyaya System. Praśastapāda Bhāṣya is actually not a commentary but an independent compendium of the tenets of the Vaisheshika School. Udayanacharya of the Navya-Nyāya School, the author of Lakṣaṇāvalī which gives the definitions of Vaiśeṣika terms, and Nyāya Kusumanjali which is a systematic account of Nyaya Theism, who also belonged to Mithila, had written Kiranavali which is a commentary on Praśastapāda Bhāṣya.

Praśastapāda can be tentatively dated to the second half of the 6th century C.E. The Vaiśeṣika philosophy recognizes twenty-four gunas or qualities that are inherent in substances; these include seventeen gunas listed by Kanada and seven gunas – gurutva (heaviness), dravatva (fluidity), sneha (viscidity), dharma (merit), adharma (demerit), shabda (sound) and samskara (faculty) - added by Praśastapāda. Vyomavati of Vyomaśekhara, Nyayakandali of Shridhara, Kiranavali of Udayana and Lilavati of Śrīvatsa are well known commentaries on his works.

Praśastapāda refers to a type of perception that is the simple intuition (alochana) of the proper form (svarupa) of an entity, which is the apprehension of an undifferentiated (avibhktam) whole arising from cognition of its specific universals. This is the preliminary stage. He differs from Dignāga for whom the determinates of cognitions are subjective constructs imposed upon the given, and constructive cognition is not a perception; Praśastapāda, who was a realist, avers that the determinates are objective constituents of reality and their conceptual co-relates are not inter-subjective fictions. Praśastapāda by redefining substance as per se a possessor of attributes opened new turf by separating the cosmological from the logical dimensions of concepts. His commentary overshadowed the Vaisheshika Sutras and became the main vehicle for later commentaries. Praśastapāda describes the dissolution of the earth, water, air and fire in terms of their atomic constituents but excludes space because space is non-atomic. With regard to the conjoining and disjoining of atoms he includes a higher will or order as the guiding principle of universal dissolution which over-rides the natural karma of atoms.

Kaṇāda does not directly refer to Ishvara (God) but Praśastapāda sees Ishvara as the cause of the universe but does not explain how God creates.
