= Kaṇāda =

Vedic sage and founder of Vaisheshika school of Hindu philosophy

- Statue of Mahāṛṣi Kaṇāda at the entrance of the Uchchaith Bhagwati Mandir in the Mithila region of Bihar.
- Born: Unclear, 6th – 2nd century BCE
- Relatives: Kaśyapa, Sulakśada (parents)

Philosophical work
- Region: Indian philosophy
- School: Vaiśeṣika
- Main interests: Metaphysics Ethics Physics
- Notable ideas: Atomism

Kaṇāda (Sanskrit: कणाद, IAST: Kaṇāda), also known as Kaṇabhaksha, Kaṇabhuj was an ancient Indian natural scientist and philosopher who founded the Vaisheshika school of Indian philosophy that also represents the earliest Indian physics.

Estimated to have lived sometime between 6th century to 2nd century BCE, little is known about his life. His traditional name Kaṇāda means "eater of atoms", and he is known for developing the foundations of an atomistic approach to philosophy in the Sanskrit text Vaiśeṣika Sūtra. His text is also known as Kaṇāda Sūtra, or "Aphorisms of Kaṇāda".

The school founded by Kaṇāda explains the creation and existence of the universe by proposing an atomistic theory, applying logic and realism, and is one of the earliest known systematic realist ontology in human history. Kaṇāda suggested that everything can be subdivided, but this subdivision cannot go on forever, and there must be smallest entities (paramāṇu) that cannot be divided, that are eternal, that aggregate in different ways to yield complex substances and bodies with unique identity, a process that involves heat, and this is the basis for all material existence. He used these ideas with the concept of Atman (soul, Self) to develop a non-theistic means to moksha. If viewed from the prism of physics, his ideas imply a clear role for the observer as independent of the system being studied. Kaṇāda's ideas were influential on other schools of Hinduism, and over its history became closely associated with the Nyaya school of Hindu philosophy.

Kaṇāda's system speaks of six properties (padārthas) that are nameable and knowable. He claims that these are sufficient to describe everything in the universe, including observers. These six categories are dravya (substance), guṇa (quality), karma (action/ motion), sāmānya (generality/ commonness), viśeṣa (particular), and samavāya (inherence). There are nine classes of substances (dravya), some of which are atomic, some non-atomic, and others that are all-pervasive.

The ideas of Kaṇāda span a wide range of fields, and they influenced not only philosophy, but possibly scholars in other fields such as Charaka who wrote a medical text named Charaka Samhita.

== Lifetime ==
The century in which Kaṇāda lived is unclear and has been a subject of a long debate. In his review of 1961, Riepe states Kaṇāda lived sometime before 300 CE, but convincing evidence to firmly put him in a certain century remains elusive.

The Vaiśeṣika Sūtras mention competing schools of Indian philosophy such as Sāṃkhya and Mīmāṃsā, but make no mention of Buddhism, which has led scholars in more recent publications to posit estimates of 6th century BCE. The Vaiśeṣika Sūtra manuscript has survived into the modern era in multiple versions and the discovery of newer manuscripts in different parts of India by Thakur in 1957 and Jambuvijayaji in 1961, followed by critical edition studies, suggest that the text attributed to Kaṇāda was systematized and finalized sometime between 200 BCE and the start of the common era, with the possibility that its key doctrines may be much older. Multiple Hindu texts dated to the 1st and 2nd century CE, such as the Mahāvibhāṣa and Jñānaprasthana from the Kushan Empire, quote and comment on Kaṇāda's doctrines. His ideas are also mentioned in Buddhist texts attributed to Aśvaghoṣa of the same period.

In Jainism literature, he is referred as Sad-uluka, which means "the Uluka who propounded the doctrine of six categories". His Vaiśeṣika philosophy similarly appears with alternate names, such as "Aulukya philosophy" (derived from his nickname Uluka "owl"). (Note: A legend in the Hindu tradition states that ascetic scholar Kanada would spend all day in his studies and in meditation, eat only once every night like an owl.)

Kaṇāda was influential in Indian philosophies appearing in various texts by dictators, philosophers, and more, such as Kashyapa, Uluka, Kananda, Kanabhuk among others.

== Ideas ==
Physics is central to Kaṇāda's assertion that all that is knowable is based on motion. His ascribing centrality to physics in the understanding of the universe also follows from his invariance principles. For example, he says that the atom must be spherical since it should be the same in all dimensions. He asserts that all substances are composed of four types of atoms, two of which have mass and two are massless.

Kaṇāda presents his work within a larger moral framework by defining Dharma as that which brings about material progress and highest good. He follows this sūtra with another that asserts that the Vedas have gained respect because they teach such Dharma, and something is not Dharma simply because it is in the Vedas.

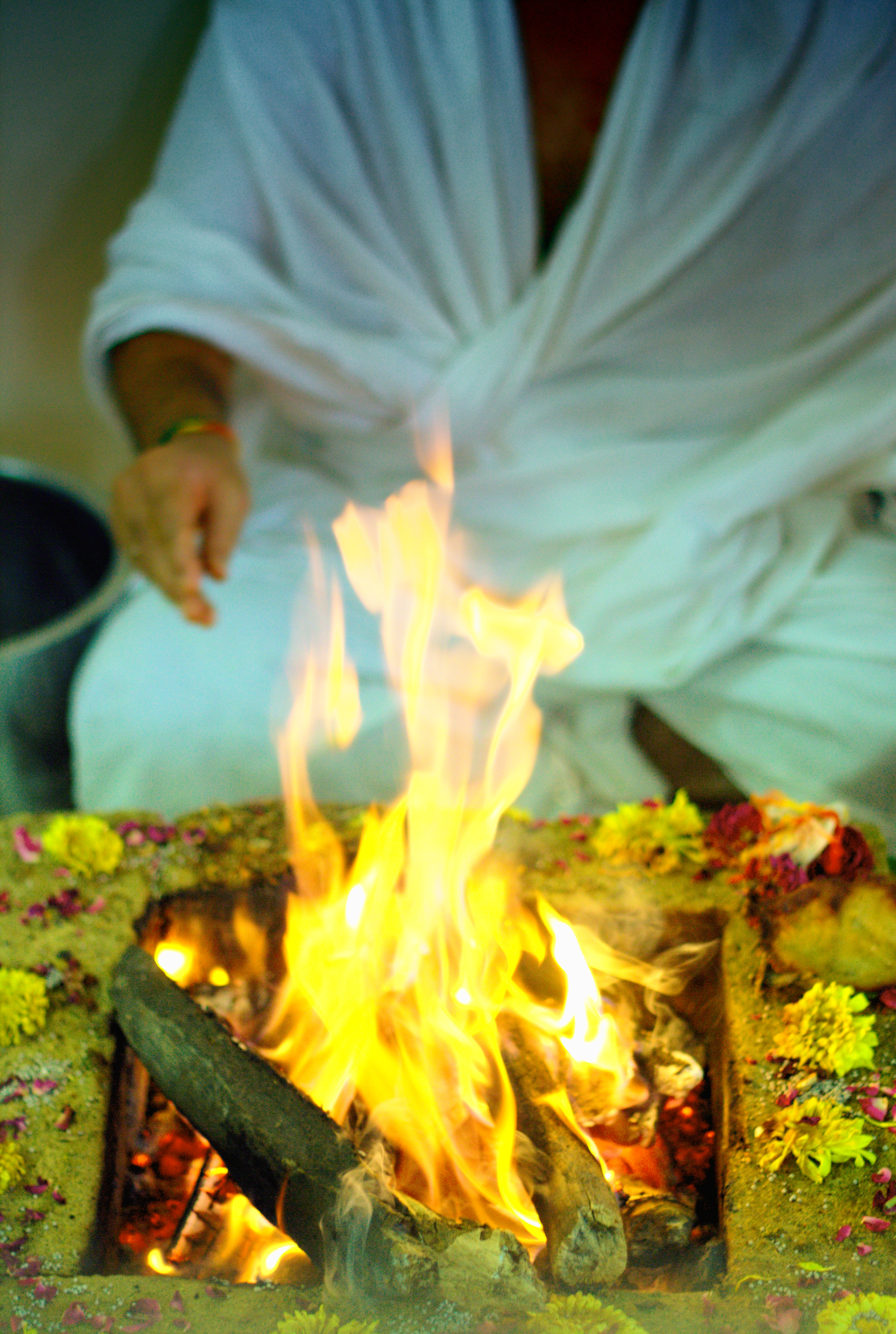
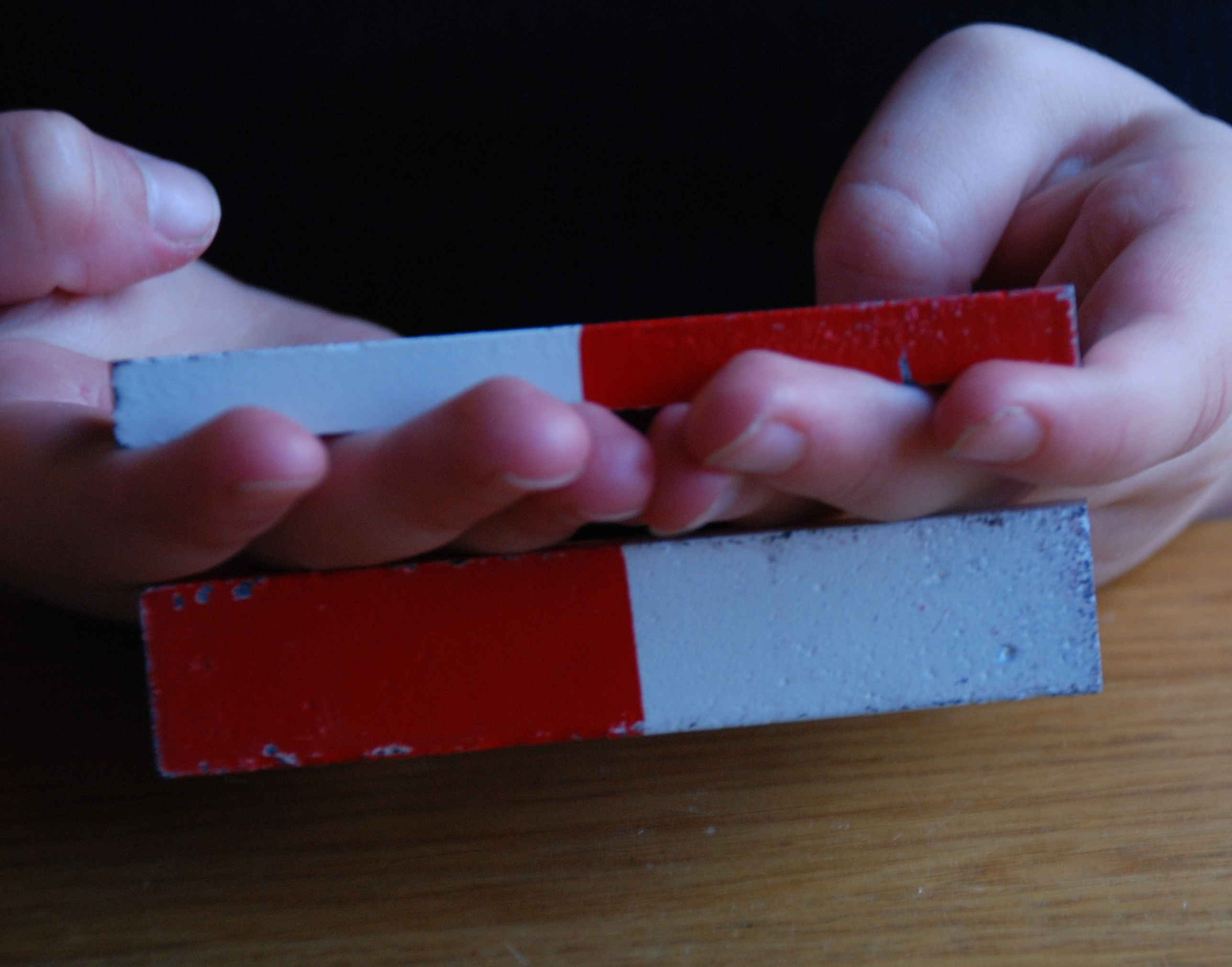
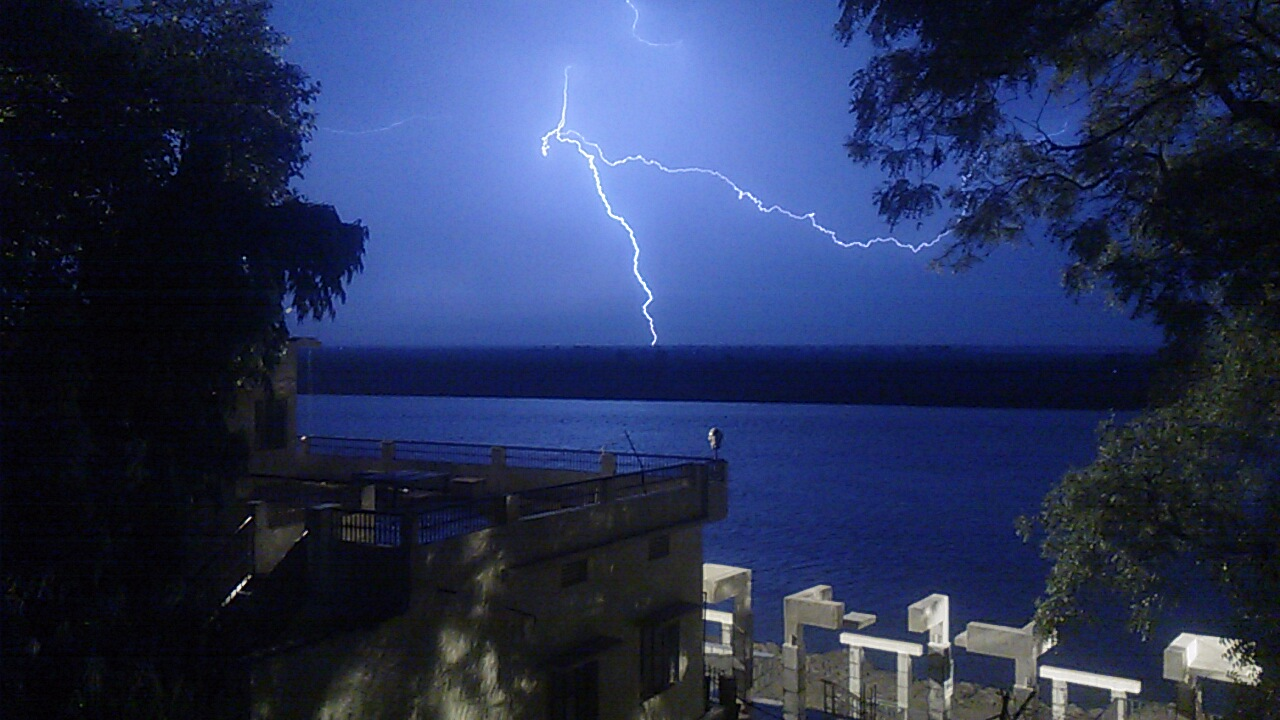
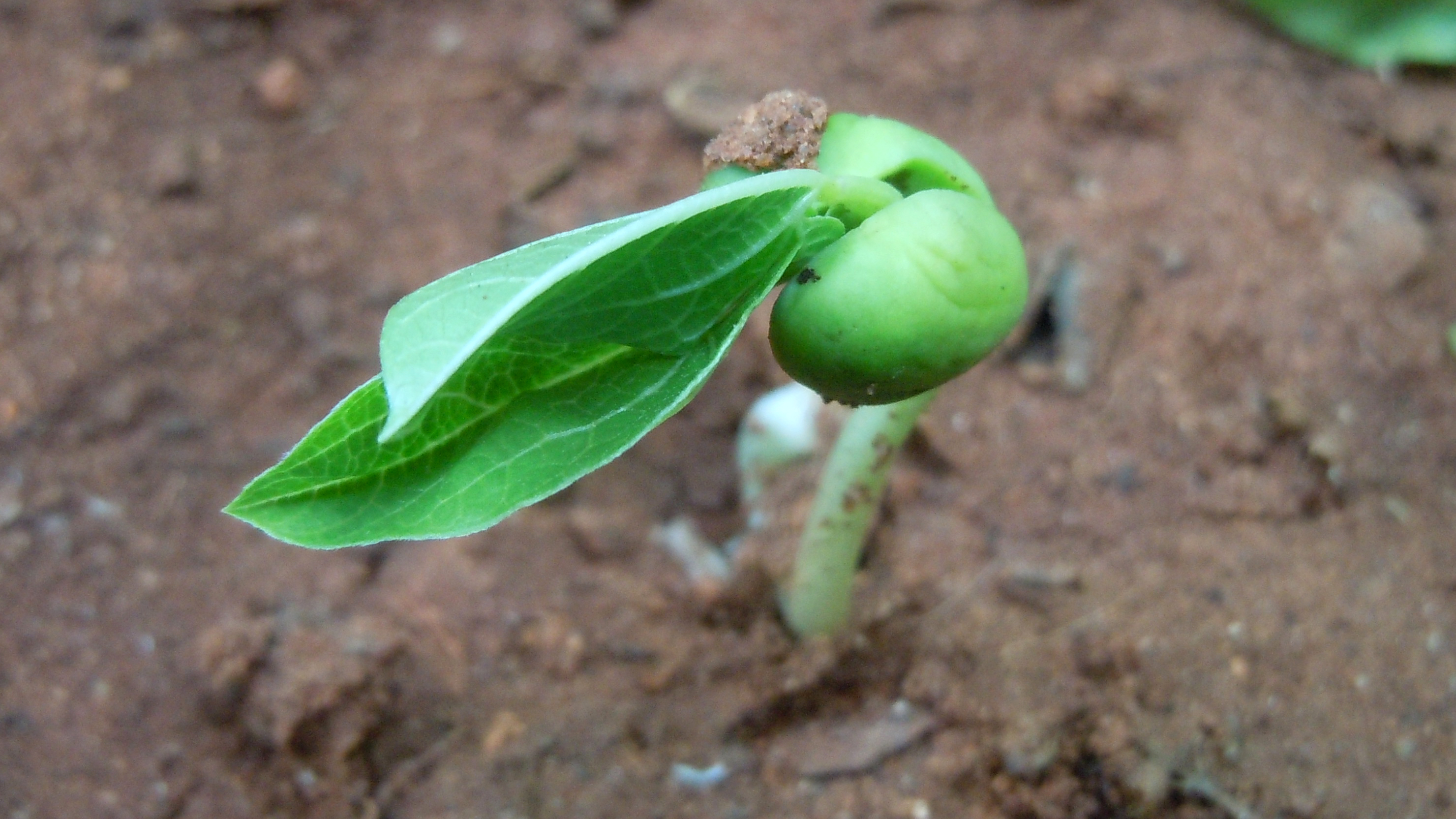
Kanada makes empirical observations such as the rising upwards of fire, magnetic movement, rain and thunder, the growth of grass, and offers naturalistic explanations to them in his text Vaisheshika Sutra.

Kaṇāda and early Vaisheshika scholars focused on the evolution of the universe by law. However, this was not unusual for his times since several major early versions of Hindu philosophies such as Sāṃkhya, Nyāya, Mīmāṃsā along with sub-schools of Yoga and Vedanta, as well as non-Vedic schools such as Jainism and Buddhism, were similarly non-theistic. Kaṇāda was among the sages of India who believed in man's potential to understand existence and reach moksha on his own, without God, a notion of ancient Indians summarized by Nietzsche as the belief that "with piety and knowledge of the Veda, nothing is impossible".

The text states:

- There are nine constituents of realities: four classes of atoms (earth, water, light and air), space (akāṣa), time (kāla), direction (diśa), infinity of souls (Ātman), mind (manas).
- Every object of creation is made of atoms (paramāṇu) Atoms are eternal, and their combinations constitute the empirical material world.
- Individual souls are eternal and pervade material bodies for a time.
- There are six categories (padārtha) of experience—substance, quality, activity, generality, particularity, and inherence.

Several traits of substances (dravya) are given as colour, taste, smell, touch, number, size, the separate, coupling and uncoupling, priority and posterity, comprehension, pleasure and pain, attraction and revulsion, and wishes.

Thus the idea of the subdivision is carried further to analytical categories as well, which explains its affinity with Nyaya.

=== Observations and theories ===
In the fifth chapter of Vaiśeṣika Sūtra, Kaṇāda mentions various empirical observations and natural phenomena such as the falling of objects to the ground, rising of fire and heat upwards, the growth of grass upwards, the nature of rainfall and thunderstorms, the flow of liquids, the movement towards a magnet among many others, asks why these things happen, then attempts to integrate his observations with his theories on atoms, molecules, and their interaction. He classifies observed events into two: those caused by volition, and those caused by subject-object conjunctions.

His idea of the observer, that is the subject, being different from objective reality is completely consistent with Vedanta, which speaks of the difference between "Apara" and "Para" knowledge, where "Apara" represents normal associational knowledge whereas "Para" represents deeper subjective knowledge.

=== The concept of paramanu (atom) ===
Vaiśeṣika Darśana
Dharma is that through which there is the accomplishment of rising to the unsurpassed good. Because it is an exposition of that, it has the authority of Veda. – Vaiśeṣika Sūtras 1.1-2

(...) That there is only one individual (soul) is known from the absence of particularity when it comes to the emergence of an understanding of happiness and suffering, (whereas) a multiplicity of individuals is inferred from their perseverance in dharma, and from the strength of their teaching. – Vaiśeṣika Sūtras 3.16-18

The true being is eternal, having no cause. Its indicator is its effect. The presence of the effect arises from the presence of its cause. – Vaiśeṣika Sūtras 4.1-3

— Kaṇāda, Translated by John Wells

Kaṇāda proposes that paramāṇu (atom) is an indestructible particle of matter. The atom is indivisible because it is a state at which no measurement can be attributed. He used invariance arguments to determine properties of the atoms. He also stated that anu can have two states—absolute rest and a state of motion.

Kaṇāda postulated four different kinds of atoms: two with mass, and two without. Each substance is supposed to consist of all four kinds of atoms.

Kaṇāda's conception of the atom was likely independent from the similar concept among the ancient Greeks, because of the differences between the theories. For example, Kaṇāda suggested that atoms as building blocks differ both qualitatively and quantitatively, while Greeks suggested that atoms differed only quantitatively but not qualitatively.

== See also ==
- Timeline of atomic and subatomic physics
- List of Indian inventions and discoveries
- Leucippus
- Democritus
- Vedanta
- Vaiśeṣika Sūtra
