= Minima naturalia =

Minima naturalia ("natural minima") (Note: Minima naturalia is the conventional Latin translation of Greek ἐλάχιστα ("elachista," singular ἐλάχιστον, "elachiston"), which means "minima.") were theorized by Aristotle as the smallest parts into which a homogeneous natural substance (e.g., flesh, bone, or wood) could be divided and still retain its essential character. In this context, "nature" means formal nature. Thus, "natural minimum" may be taken to mean "formal minimum": the minimum amount of matter necessary to instantiate a certain form.

Speculation on minima naturalia in late Antiquity, in the Islamic world, and by Scholastic and Renaissance thinkers in Europe provided a conceptual bridge between the atomism of ancient Greece and the mechanistic philosophy of early modern thinkers like René Descartes, which in turn provided a background for the rigorously mathematical and experimental atomic theory of modern science.

== Aristotle's initial suggestion ==
According to Aristotle, the Pre-Socratic Greek philosopher Anaxagoras had taught that every thing, and every portion of a thing, contains within itself an infinite number of like and unlike parts. For example, Anaxagoras maintained that there must be blackness as well as whiteness in snow; how, otherwise, could it be turned into dark water? Aristotle criticized Anaxagoras' theory on multiple grounds, among them the following:

- Animals and plants cannot be infinitely small according to Aristotle; thus the relatively homogeneous substances of which they are composed (e.g., bone and flesh in animals, or wood in plants) could not be infinitely small, either, but must have a smallest determinate size—i.e., a natural minimum.
- On Anaxagoras' argument in which all things contain all others infinitely, water could be drawn from flesh, then flesh from that water, and water from that flesh, and so on. However, as above, because there is a smallest determinate size beyond which a further divided substance would no longer be flesh, any further cycle of such drawings out would be impossible.
- Moreover, "[s]ince every body must diminish in size when something is taken from it, and flesh is quantitatively definite in respect both of greatness and smallness, it is clear that from the minimum quantity of flesh no body can be separated out; for the flesh left would be less than the minimum of flesh."

Unlike the atomism of Leucippus, Democritus, and Epicurus, and also unlike the later atomic theory of John Dalton, the Aristotelian natural minimum was not conceptualized as physically indivisible--"atomic" in the contemporary sense. Instead, the concept was rooted in Aristotle's hylomorphic worldview, which held that every physical thing is a compound of matter (Greek hyle) and a substantial form (Greek morphe) that imparts its essential nature and structure. For instance, a rubber ball for a hylomorphist like Aristotle would be rubber (matter) structured by spherical shape (form).

Aristotle's intuition was that there is some smallest size beyond which matter could no longer be structured as flesh, or bone, or wood, or some other such organic substance that (for Aristotle, living before the microscope) could be considered homogeneous. For instance, if flesh were divided beyond its natural minimum, what would remain might be some elemental water, and smaller amounts of the other elements (e.g., earth) with which water was thought to mix to form flesh. But whatever was left, the water (or earth, etc.), would no longer have the formal "nature" of flesh in particular – the remaining matter would have the form of water (or earth, etc.) rather than the substantial form of flesh.

This is suggestive of modern chemistry, in which, e.g., a bar of gold can be continually divided until one has a single atom of gold, but further division of that atom of gold yields only subatomic particles (electrons, quarks, etc.) which are no longer the chemical element gold. Just as water alone is not flesh, electrons alone are not gold.

== Scholastic elaboration ==
Aristotle's brief comments on minima naturalia in the Physics and Meteorology prompted further speculations by later philosophers. The idea was taken up by John Philoponus and Simplicius of Cilicia in late Antiquity and by the Islamic Aristotelian Averroes (Ibn Rushd).

Minima naturalia were discussed by Scholastic and Renaissance thinkers including Roger Bacon, Albertus Magnus, Thomas Aquinas, Giles of Rome, Siger of Brabant, Boethius of Dacia, Richard of Middleton, Duns Scotus, John of Jandun, William of Ockham, William Alnwick, Walter Bury, Adam de Wodeham, Jean Buridan, Gregory of Rimini, John Dumbleton, Nicole Oresme, John Marsilius Inguen, (Note: Not to be confused with Marsilius of Inghen) John Wycliffe, Albert of Saxony, Facinus de Ast, Peter Alboinis of Mantua, Paul of Venice, Gaetano of Thiene, Alessandro Achillini, Luis Coronel, Juan de Celaya, Domingo de Soto, Didacus de Astudillo, Ludovicus Buccaferrea, Francisco de Toledo, and Benedict Pereira. Of this list, the most influential Scholastic thinkers on minima naturalia were Duns Scotus and Gregory of Rimini.

A chief theme in later commentary is reconciling minima naturalia with the general Aristotelian principle of infinite divisibility. Commentators like Philoponus and Aquinas reconciled these aspects of Aristotle's thought by distinguishing between mathematical and "natural" divisibility. For example, in his commentary on Aristotle's Physics, Aquinas writes of natural minima that, "although a body, considered mathematically, is divisible to infinity, the natural body is not divisible to infinity. For in a mathematical body nothing but quantity is considered. And in this there is nothing repugnant to division to infinity. But in a natural body the form also is considered, which form requires a determinate quantity and also other accidents. Whence it is not possible for quantity to be found in the species of flesh except as determined within some termini."

== Influence on corpuscularianism ==
In the early modern period, Aristotelian hylomorphism fell out of favor with the rise of the "mechanical philosophy" of thinkers like Descartes and John Locke, who were more sympathetic to the ancient Greek atomism of Democritus than to the natural minima of Aristotle. However, the concept of minima naturalia continued to shape philosophical thinking even among these mechanistic philosophers in the transitional centuries between the Aristotelianism of the medieval Scholastics and the worked-out atomic theory of modern scientists like Dalton.

The mechanist Pierre Gassendi discussed minima naturalia in the course of expounding his opposition to Scholastic Aristotelianism, and his own attempted reconciliation between the atomism of Epicurus and the Catholic faith. Aristotle's mininima naturalia became "corpuscles" in the alchemical works of Geber and Daniel Sennert, who in turn influenced the corpuscularian alchemist Robert Boyle, one of the founders of modern chemistry. Boyle occasionally referred to his postulated corpuscles as minima naturalia.
