= Physis =

Greek philosophical and theological term

Physis (/ˈfaɪsɪs/; Ancient Greek: φύσις [pʰýsis]; pl. physeis, φύσεις) is a Greek philosophical, theological, and scientific term, usually translated into English—according to its Latin translation "natura"—as "nature". The term originated in ancient Greek philosophy, and was later used in Christian theology and Western philosophy. In pre-Socratic usage, physis was contrasted with νόμος, nomos, "law, human convention". Another opposition, particularly well-known from the works of Aristotle, is that of physis and techne – in this case, what is produced and what is artificial are distinguished from beings that arise spontaneously from their own essence, as do agents such as humans. Further, since Aristotle the physical (the subject matter of physics, properly τὰ φυσικά "natural things") has been juxtaposed to the metaphysical.

== Linguistics ==
The Greek word physis can be considered the equivalent of the Latin natura. The abstract term physis is derived from the verb phyesthai/phynai, which means “to grow”, “to develop”, “to become” (Frisk 2006: 1052; Caspers 2010b: 1068). In ancient philosophy one also finds the noun "physis" referring to the growth expressed in the verb phyesthai/phynai and to the origin of development (Plato, Menexenos 237a; Aristotle, Metaphysics 1014b16–17). In terms of linguistic history, this verb is related to forms such as the English “be”, German sein or Latin esse (Lohmann 1960: 174; Pfeifer 1993: 1273; Beekes 2010: 1598). In Greek itself, the aorist (a verbal aspect) of “to be” can be expressed with forms of phynai. With regard to its kinship with “being” and the basic meaning of the verb stem phy- or bhu- (“growing”), there has long been criticism of the conventional translation of the word "physis" with “nature”. With the Latin natura, which for its part goes back to the verb nasci (“to be born”), one transfers the basic word "physis" into a different sphere of association. In this way, the emerging growth (of plants, for instance) is transferred into the realm of being born.

== Greek philosophy ==
=== Pre-Socratic usage ===
The word φύσις is a verbal noun based on φύειν "to grow, to appear" (cognate with English "to be"). In Homeric Greek it is used quite literally, of the manner of growth of a particular species of plant.

In pre-Socratic philosophy, beginning with Heraclitus, physis in keeping with its etymology of "growing, becoming" is always used in the sense of the "natural" development, although the focus might lie either with the origin, or the process, or the end result of the process. There is some evidence that by the 6th century BC, beginning with the Ionian School, the word could also be used in the comprehensive sense, as referring to "all things", as it were "Nature" in the sense of "Universe".

In the Sophist tradition, the term stood in opposition to nomos (νόμος), "law" or "custom", in the debate on which parts of human existence are natural, and which are due to convention. The contrast of physis vs. nomos could be applied to any subject, much like the modern contrast of "nature vs. nurture".

=== In Plato's Laws ===
In book 10 of Laws, Plato criticizes those who write works peri physeōs. The criticism is that such authors tend to focus on a purely "naturalistic" explanation of the world, ignoring the role of "intention" or technē, and thus becoming prone to the error of naive atheism. Plato accuses even Hesiod of this, for the reason that the gods in Hesiod "grow" out of primordial entities after the physical universe had been established.

Because those who use the term mean to say that nature is the first creative power; but if the soul turns out to be the primeval element, and not fire or air, then in the truest sense and beyond other things the soul may be said to exist by nature; and this would be true if you proved that the soul is older than the body, but not otherwise.

— Plato's Laws, Book 10(892c) – translation by Benjamin Jowett

=== Aristotle ===
According to Aristotle, "physis" (nature) is dependent on "techne" (art).

Aristotle sought out the definition of "physis" to prove that there was more than one definition of "physis", and more than one way to interpret nature. "Though Aristotle retains the ancient sense of "physis" as growth, he insists that an adequate definition of "physis" requires the different perspectives of the four causes (aitia): material, efficient, formal, and final." Aristotle believed that nature itself contained its own source of matter (material), power/motion (efficiency), form, and end (final). A unique feature about Aristotle's definition of "physis" was his relationship between art and nature. Aristotle said that "physis" (nature) is dependent on techne (art). "The critical distinction between art and nature concerns their different efficient causes: nature is its own source of motion, whereas techne always requires a source of motion outside itself." What Aristotle was trying to bring to light, was that art does not contain within itself its form or source of motion. Consider the process of an acorn becoming an oak tree. This is a natural process that has its own driving force behind it. There is no external force pushing this acorn to its final state, rather it is progressively developing towards one specific end (telos).

=== Atomists ===
Quite different conceptions of "physis" are to be found in other Greek traditions of thought, e.g. the so-called Atomists, whose thinking found a continuation in the writings of Epicurus. For them, the world that appears is the result of an interplay between the void and the eternal movement of the “indivisible”, the atoms. This doctrine, most often associated with the names Democritus and Leucippus, is known mainly from the critical reactions to it in Aristotelian writings. It was supplemented by Epicurus in the light of developments in philosophy, in order to explain phenomena such as freedom of will. This was done by means of the theory of atoms’ “ability to deviate”, the parenklisis.

== Christian theology ==
Though φύσις was often used in Hellenistic philosophy, it is used only 14 times in the New Testament (10 of those in the writings of Paul). Its meaning varies throughout Paul's writings. One usage refers to the established or natural order of things, as in Romans 2:14 where Paul writes "For when Gentiles, who do not have the law, by nature do what the law requires, they are a law to themselves, even though they do not have the law." Another use of φύσις in the sense of "natural order" is Romans 1:26 where he writes "the men likewise gave up natural relations with women and were consumed with passion for one another". In 1 Corinthians 11:14, Paul asks "Does not nature itself teach you that if a man wears long hair it is a disgrace for him?"

This use of φύσις as referring to a "natural order" in Romans 1:26 and 1 Corinthians 11:14 may have been influenced by Stoicism. The Greek philosophers, including Aristotle and the Stoics are credited with distinguishing between man-made laws and a natural law of universal validity, but Gerhard Kittel states that the Stoic philosophers were not able to combine the concepts of νόμος (law) and φύσις (nature) to produce the concept of "natural law" in the sense that was made possible by Judeo-Christian theology.

As part of the Pauline theology of salvation by grace, Paul writes in Ephesians 2:3 that "we all once lived in the passions of our flesh, carrying out the desires of the body and the mind, and were by nature children of wrath, like the rest of mankind. In the next verse he writes, "by grace you have been saved."

=== In patristic theology ===
Theologians of the early Christian period differed in the usage of this term. In Antiochene circles, it connoted the humanity or divinity of Christ conceived as a concrete set of characteristics or attributes. In Alexandrine thinking, it meant a concrete individual or independent existent and approximated to hypostasis without being a synonym. While it refers to much the same thing as ousia it is more empirical and descriptive focussing on function while ousia is metaphysical and focuses more on reality. Although found in the context of the Trinitarian debate, it is chiefly important in the Christology of Cyril of Alexandria.

== In modern usage ==
The Greek adjective physikos is represented in various forms in modern English: As physics "the study of nature", as physical (via Middle Latin physicalis) referring both to physics (the study of nature, the material universe) and to the human body. The term physiology (physiologia) is of 16th-century coinage (Jean Fernel). The term physique, for "the bodily constitution of a person", is a 19th-century loan from French.

In medicine the suffix -physis occurs in such compounds as symphysis, epiphysis, and a few others, in the sense of "a growth". The physis also refers to the "growth plate", or site of growth at the end of long bones.

== See also ==
- Ontology
- Substance theory
