= Atomism =

Natural philosophy holding that the world comprises fundamental indivisible components

Atomism (from Ancient Greek ἄτομον (atomon) 'uncuttable, indivisible') is a natural philosophy proposing that the physical universe is composed of fundamental indivisible components known as atoms.

The concept of atomism appeared in both ancient Greek and ancient Indian philosophical traditions. Atomism in multiple different forms originated in ancient Greece. The word atom is derived from the term atomos ("uncuttable") used by the Greek philosophers Leucippus and his pupil Democritus, who developed this idea in the 5th century BC. Leucippus, Democritus, and other ancient Greek atomists argued that nature consists of two fundamental principles: atoms and void. Clusters of different shapes, arrangements, and positions give rise to the various macroscopic substances in the world.A similar idea was developed by Kanāda of the Vaiśeṣika school, who proposed indivisible particles (paramāṇu). Indian Buddhists, such as Dharmakirti (fl. c. 6th or 7th century) and others, developed distinctive theories of atomism, for example, involving momentary (instantaneous) atoms (kalapas) that flash in and out of existence.

The particles of chemical matter for which chemists and other natural philosophers of the early 19th century found experimental evidence were thought to be indivisible, and therefore were given by John Dalton the name "atom", long used by the atomist philosophy. Although the connection to historical atomism is at best tenuous, elementary particles have become a modern analogue of philosophical atoms.

== Antiquity ==
=== Greek atomism ===
==== Leucippus and Democritus ====
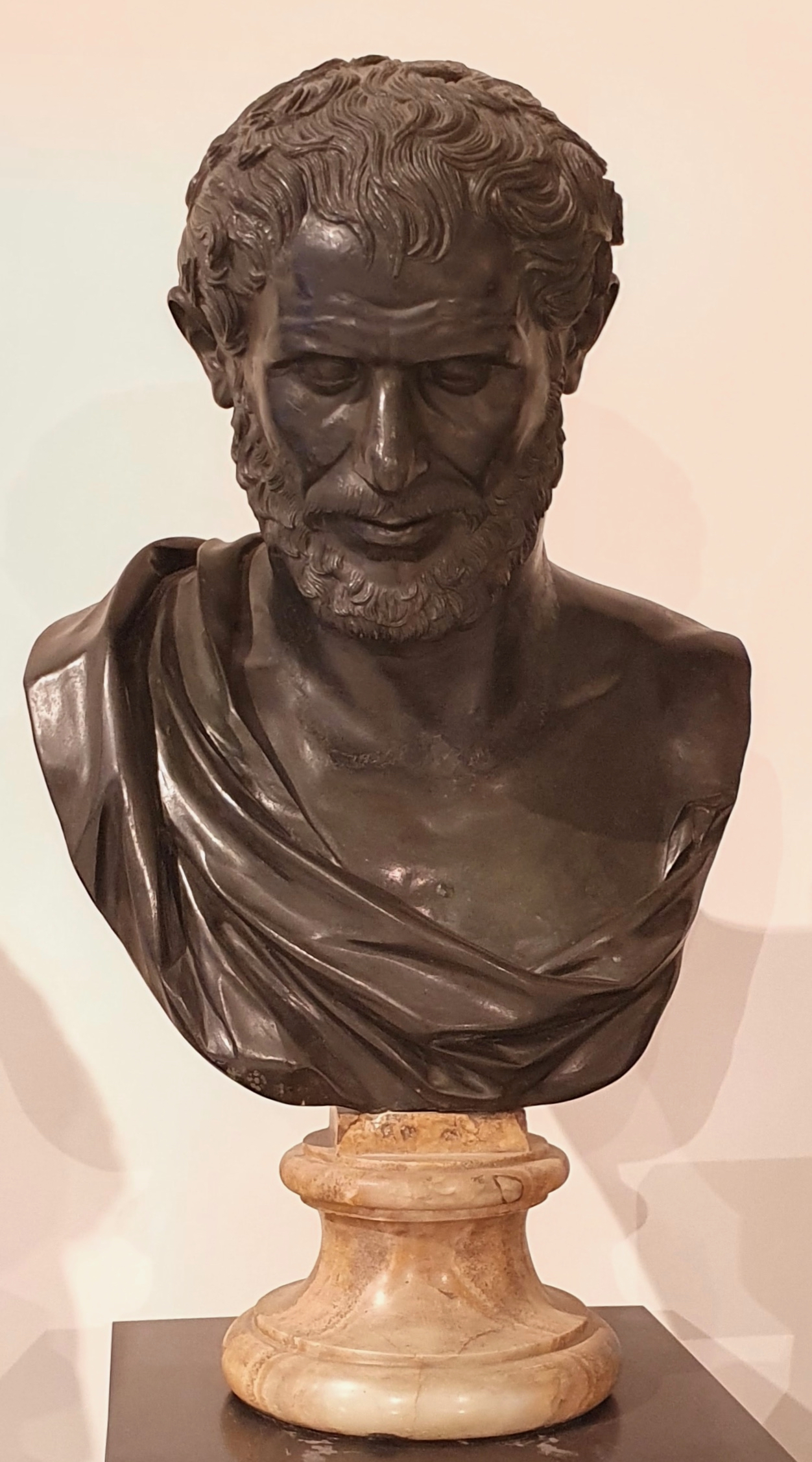
Democritus

In the 5th century BC, Leucippus and his pupil Democritus proposed that all matter was composed of small indivisible particles which they called "atoms". Nothing whatsoever is known about Leucippus except that he was the teacher of Democritus. Democritus, by contrast, wrote prolifically, producing over eighty known treatises, none of which have survived to the present day complete. However, a massive number of fragments and quotations of his writings have survived. These are the main source of information on his teachings about atoms. Democritus's argument for the existence of atoms hinged on the idea that it is impossible to keep dividing matter infinitely - and that matter must therefore be made up of extremely tiny particles. The atomistic theory aimed to remove the "distinction which the Eleatic school drew between the Absolute, or the only real existence, and the world of change around us."

The views of Democritus began as a response to the work of Parmenides who had given logical arguments against the existence of change, arguing that change is a illusion. Democritus rejected Parmenides' belief that change is an illusion. He believed change was real, and if it was not then at least the illusion had to be explained. He thus supported the concept of void, and stated that the universe is made up of many entities that move around in the void. The void is infinite and provides the space in which the atoms can pack or scatter differently. The different possible packings and scatterings within the void make up the shifting outlines and bulk of the objects that organisms feel, see, eat, hear, smell, and taste. While organisms may feel hot or cold, hot and cold actually have no real existence. They are simply sensations produced in organisms by the different packings and scatterings of the atoms in the void that compose the object that organisms sense as being "hot" or "cold". As Democritus puts it:

By convention sweet is sweet, by convention bitter is bitter, by convention hot is hot, by convention cold is cold, by convention color is color. But in reality there are atoms and the void.

Democritus believed that atoms are too small for human senses to detect, that they are infinitely many, that they come in infinitely many varieties, and that they have always existed. They float in a vacuum, which Democritus called the "void", and they vary in form, order, and posture. Some atoms, he maintained, are convex, others concave, some shaped like hooks, and others like eyes. They are constantly moving and colliding into each other. Democritus wrote that atoms and void are the only things that exist and that all other things are merely said to exist by social convention. The objects humans see in everyday life are composed of many atoms united by random collisions and their forms and materials are determined by what kinds of atom make them up. Likewise, human perceptions are caused by atoms as well. Bitterness is caused by small, angular, jagged atoms passing across the tongue; whereas sweetness is caused by larger, smoother, more rounded atoms passing across the tongue.

The work of Democritus survives only in secondhand reports, some of which are unreliable or conflicting. Much of the best evidence of Democritus' theory of atomism is reported by Aristotle (384–322 BCE) in his discussions of Democritus' and Plato's contrasting views on the types of indivisibles composing the natural world.

==== Plato ====
Plato, as expressed by Timaeus, described solids as composed of indivisible triangles. Different arrangements of these triangles lead to four simple bodies of fire, air, water, and earth; rearrangements of the triangles were possible, accounting for the possible transformation of these elements.

Geometrical simple bodies according to Plato
Element	Polyhedron		Number of faces	Number of triangles
Fire	Tetrahedron	Tetrahedron	4	24
Air	Octahedron	Octahedron	8	48
Water	Icosahedron	Icosahedron	20	120
Earth	Cube	Hexahedron (cube)	6	24

Plato postulated the geometric structure of the simple bodies of the four elements as summarized in the adjacent table. The cube, with its flat base and stability, was assigned to earth; the tetrahedron was assigned to fire because its penetrating points and sharp edges made it mobile. The points and edges of the octahedron and icosahedron were blunter and so these less mobile bodies were assigned to air and water. Since the simple bodies could be decomposed into triangles, and the triangles reassembled into atoms of different elements, Plato's model offered a plausible account of changes among the primary substances.

==== Rejection in Aristotelianism ====
Sometime before 330 BC Aristotle asserted that the elements of fire, air, earth, and water were not made of atoms, but were continuous. Aristotle considered the existence of a void, which was required by atomic theories, to violate physical principles. Change took place not by the rearrangement of atoms to make new structures, but by transformation of matter from what it was in potential to a new actuality. A piece of wet clay, when acted upon by a potter, takes on its potential to be an actual drinking mug. Aristotle may have appeared to be rejecting atomism, but in ancient Greece the atomic theories of Democritus remained "pure speculations, incapable of being put to any experimental test". On the other hand, Aristotle's qualitative model provided hypotheses which could be tested.

Aristotle theorized minima naturalia as the smallest parts into which a homogeneous natural substance (e.g., flesh, bone, or wood) could be divided and still retain its essential character. Unlike the atomism of Democritus, these Aristotelian "natural minima" were not conceptualized as physically indivisible. Instead, Aristotle's concept was rooted in his hylomorphic worldview, which held that every physical thing is a compound of matter (Greek hyle) and of an immaterial substantial form (Greek morphe) that imparts its essential nature and structure. To use an analogy we could pose a rubber ball: we could imagine the rubber to be the matter that gives the ball the ability to take on another form, and the spherical shape to be the form that gives it its identity of "ball". Using this analogy, though, we should keep in mind that in fact rubber itself would already be considered a composite of form and matter, as it has identity and determinacy to a certain extent, pure or primary matter is completely unformed, unintelligible and with infinite potential to undergo change.

==== Epicurus ====
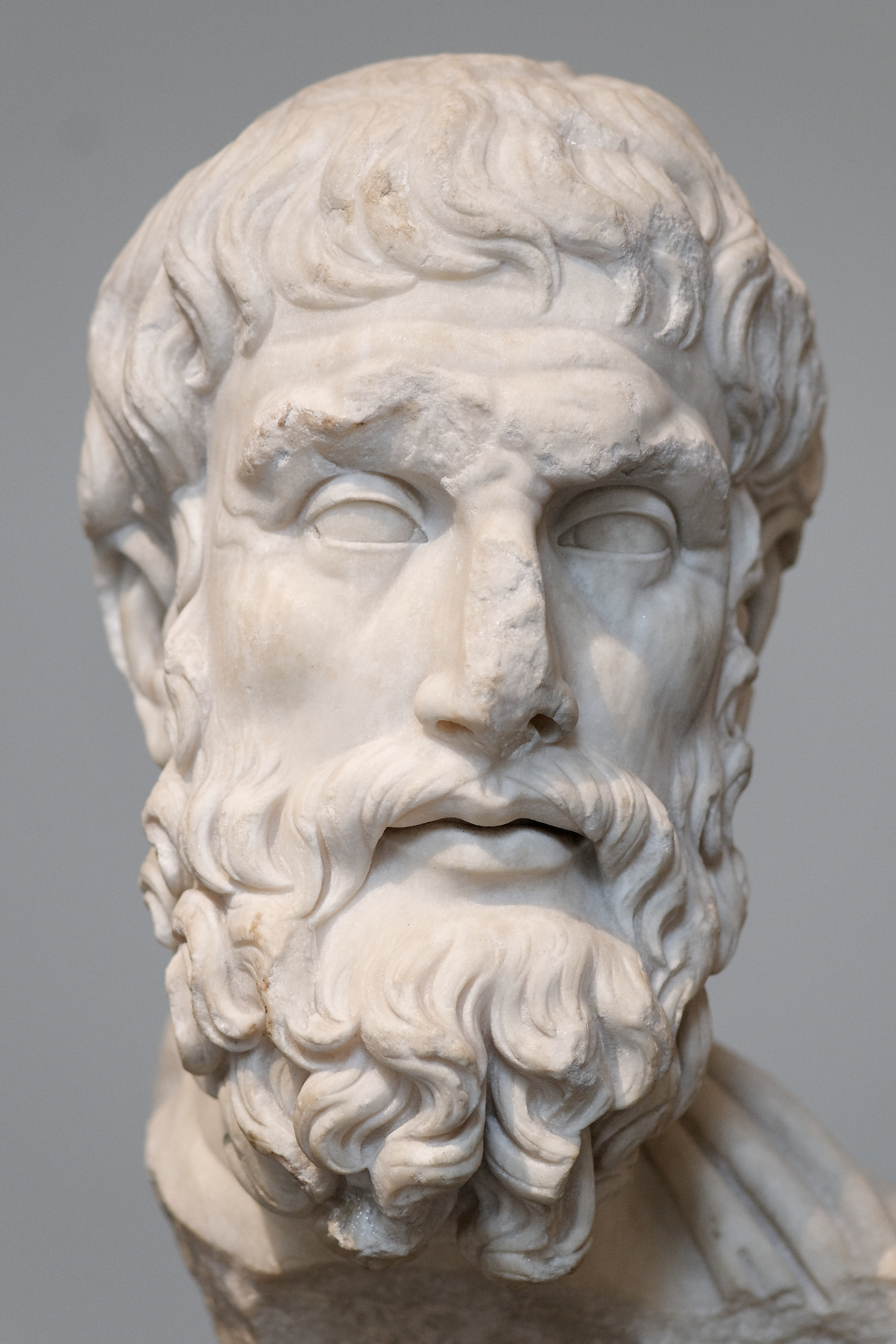
Epicurus

Epicurus (341–270 BCE) studied atomism with Nausiphanes who had been a student of Democritus. Although Epicurus was certain of the existence of atoms and the void, he was less sure we could adequately explain specific natural phenomena such as earthquakes, lightning, comets, or the phases of the Moon. Few of Epicurus' writings survive, and those that do reflect his interest in applying Democritus' theories to assist people in taking responsibility for themselves and for their own happiness—since he held there are no gods around that can help them. (Epicurus regarded the role of gods as exemplifying moral ideals.)

=== Indian atomism ===
Preliminary instances of atomism are found in the works of Vedic sage Aruni, who lived in the 8th century BCE, especially his proposition that "particles too small to be seen mass together into the substances and objects of experience" known as kaṇa. Although kana refers to "particles" not atoms (paramanu). Some scholars such as Hermann Jacobi and Randall Collins have compared Aruni to Thales of Miletus in their scientific methodology, calling them both as "primitive physicists" or "proto-materialist thinkers". Later, the Charvaka, and Ajivika schools of atomism originated as early as the 7th century BCE. Bhattacharya posits that Charvaka may have been one of several atheistic, materialist schools that existed in ancient India.

Kaṇāda, the founder of the Vaiśeṣika school of Indian philosophy, described atoms (paramāṇu) as eternal, indivisible, and imperceptible entities that combine to form all material substances. He proposed four classes of atoms (earth, water, light, and air). Kaṇāda's conception of the atom was likely independent from the similar concept among the ancient Greeks, because of the differences between the theories. For example, Kaṇāda suggested that atoms as building blocks differ both qualitatively and quantitatively, while Greeks suggested that atoms differed only quantitatively but not qualitatively, and Kaṇāda claimed that the combination of three double atoms would be visible, an idea with no parallel in the Greek models.

The Nyaya–Vaisesika school developed theories on how kaṇas combined into more complex objects.; scholars date the Nyaya and Vaisesika texts from the 9th to 4th centuries BCE. Vaisesika atomists posited the four elemental atom types, but in Vaisesika physics atoms had 25 different possible qualities, divided between general extensive properties and specific (intensive) properties. The Nyaya–Vaisesika atomists had elaborate theories of how atoms combine. In Vaisesika atomism, atoms first combine into tryaṇukas (triads) and Dvyaṇuka (dyad) before they aggregate into bodies of a kind that can be perceived.

Several of these doctrines of atomism are, in some respects, "suggestively similar" to that of Democritus. McEvilley (2002) assumes that such similarities are due to extensive cultural contact and diffusion, probably in both directions.

=== Late Roman Republic ===
==== Lucretius revives Epicurus ====
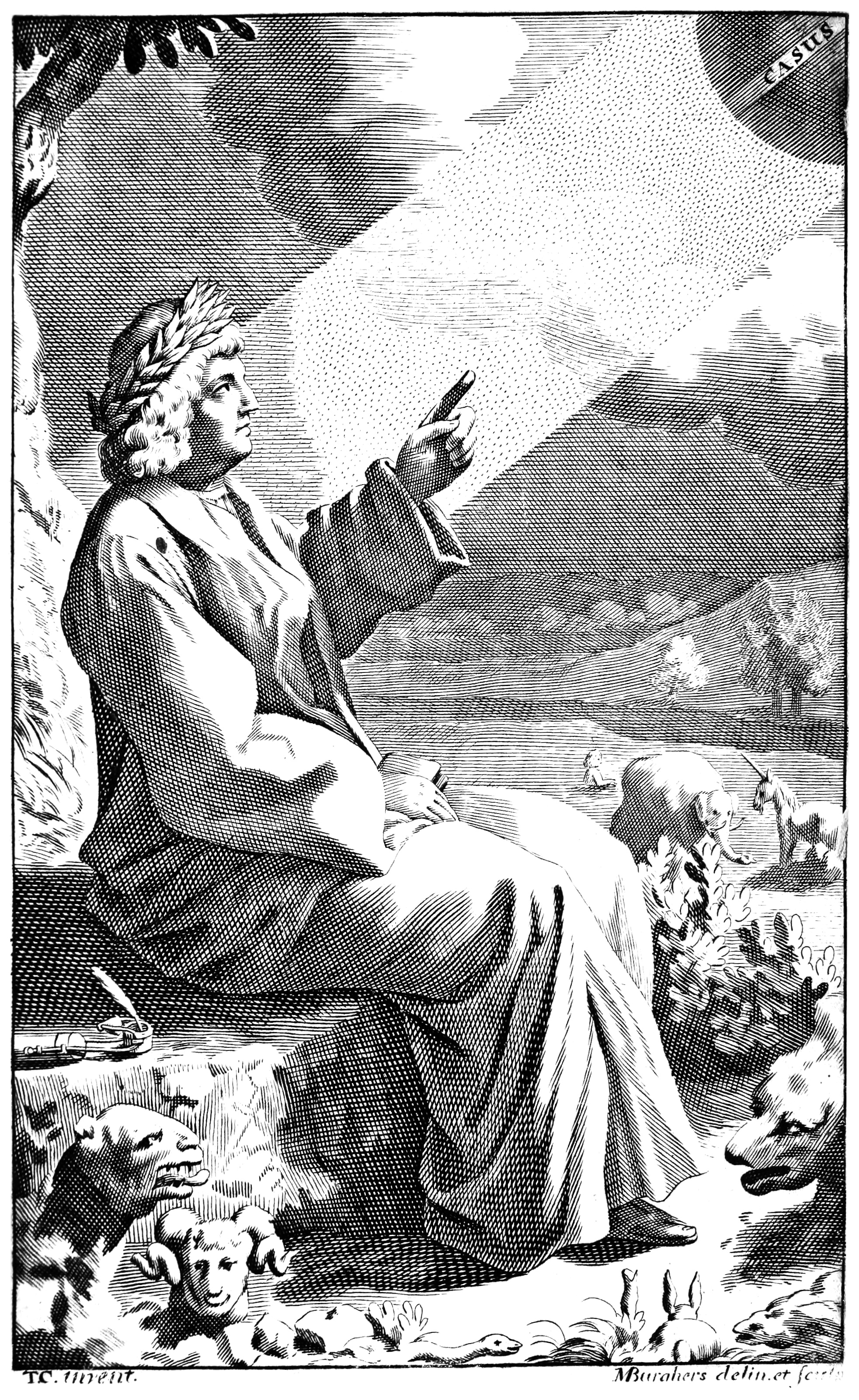
Lucretius

Epicurus' ideas re-appear in the works of his Roman follower Lucretius (c. 99 BC – c. 55 BC), who wrote On the Nature of Things. This Classical Latin scientific work in poetic form illustrates several segments of Epicurean theory on how the universe came into its current stage; it shows that the phenomena we perceive are actually composite forms. The atoms and the void are eternal and in constant motion. Atomic collisions create objects, which are still composed of the same eternal atoms whose motion for a while is incorporated into the created entity. Lucretius also explains human sensations and meteorological phenomena in terms of atomic motion.

===== "Atoms" and "vacuum" vs. religion =====
In his epic poem On the Nature of Things, Lucretius depicts Epicurus as the hero who crushed the monster Religion through educating the people in what was possible in atoms and what was not possible in atoms. However, Epicurus expressed a non-aggressive attitude characterized by his statement:

The man who best knows how to meet external threats makes into one family all the creatures he can; and those he can not, he at any rate does not treat as aliens; and where he finds even this impossible, he avoids all dealings, and, so far as is advantageous, excludes them from his life.

However, according to science historian Charles Coulston Gillispie:

Encased in the Epicurean philosophy, the atomic doctrine could never be welcome to moral authority. ... Epicurean gods neither created the world nor paid it ... attention. "Nature," says Lucretius, "is free and uncontrolled by proud masters and runs the universe by herself without the aid of gods." Only the atomists among ... Greek science ... was the one view of nature quite incompatible with theology. Like a pair of eighteenth-century philosophers, Epicurus and Lucretius introduced atomism as a vehicle of enlightenment. They meant to refute the pretensions of religion ... and release men from superstition and the undignified fear of capricious gods. Consequently, a hint of Epicureanism came to seem the mark of the beast in Christian Europe. No thinker, unless it is Machiavelli, has been more maligned by misrepresentation.

The possibility of a vacuum was accepted—or rejected—together with atoms and atomism, for the vacuum was part of that same theory.

Democritus and Lucretius denied the impossibility of a vacuum, being of the opinion that there must be a vacuum between the discrete particles (atoms) of which, they thought, all matter is composed. In general, however, the belief that a vacuum is impossible was almost universally held until the end of the sixteenth century. ... The time was certainly ripe for the revival of the belief in the possibility of a vacuum, but to the clerics the very name of the vacuum was anathema, being associated with the atomistic theories of Epicurus and Lucretius, which were felt to be heretical.

=== Roman Empire ===
==== Galen ====
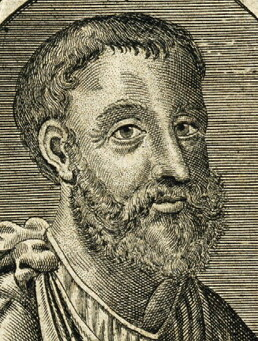
Galen

While Aristotelian philosophy eclipsed the importance of the atomists in late Roman and medieval Europe, their work was still preserved and exposited through commentaries on the works of Aristotle. In the 2nd century, Galen (AD 129–216) presented extensive discussions of the Greek atomists, especially Epicurus, in his Aristotle commentaries.

== Middle Ages ==
=== Medieval Hinduism ===
Ajivika is a "Nastika" school of thought whose metaphysics included a theory of atoms or atomism which was later adapted in the Vaiśeṣika school, which postulated that all objects in the physical universe are reducible to paramāṇu (atoms), and one's experiences are derived from the interplay of substance (a function of atoms, their number and their spatial arrangements), quality, activity, commonness, particularity and inherence. Everything was composed of atoms, qualities emerged from aggregates of atoms, but the aggregation and nature of these atoms was predetermined by cosmic forces. The school founder's traditional name Kanada means 'atom eater', and he is known for developing the foundations of an atomistic approach to physics and philosophy in the Sanskrit text Vaiśeṣika Sūtra. His text is also known as Kanada Sutras, or Aphorisms of Kanada.

=== Medieval Buddhism ===
Medieval Buddhist atomism, flourishing around the 7th century, was very different from the atomist doctrines taught in early Buddhism. Medieval Buddhist philosophers Dharmakirti and Dignāga considered atoms to be point-sized, durationless, and made of energy. In discussing the two systems, Fyodor Shcherbatskoy (1930) stresses their commonality, the postulate of "absolute qualities" (guna-dharma) underlying all empirical phenomena.

Still later, the Abhidhammattha-sangaha, a text dated to the 11th or 12th century, postulates the existence of rupa-kalapa, imagined as the smallest units of the physical world, of varying elementary composition. Invisible under normal circumstances, the rupa-kalapa are said to become visible as a result of meditative samadhi.

=== Medieval Islam ===
Atomistic philosophies are found very early in Islamic philosophy and were influenced originally by earlier Greek and, to some extent, Indian philosophy. Islamic speculative theology in general approached issues in physics from an atomistic framework.

==== Mu'tazilite atomism ====
Atomism in Mu'tazilism as an early Islamic theology is a cosmological concept that emphasizes that the universe consists of discrete (juz’ lā yatajazzā) or undivided parts created by God. This concept is also the basis for Mu'tazila's rejection of determinism. With an atomized nature, humans are considered capable of creating actions independently (mubasharah), so they deserve rewards or punishments according to their actions. This is in line with the principle that good and bad are rational and inherent in the essence of the action itself, not just the result of God's decision. The Mu'tazilah theologians and philosophers who are famous for their atomism concepts are Abu al-Hudhayl Al-'Allaf and Al-Jubba'i. While there are also Mu'tazilah theologians who are skeptical of atomism such as Ibrahim al-Nazzam.

==== Al-Ghazali and Asharite atomism ====
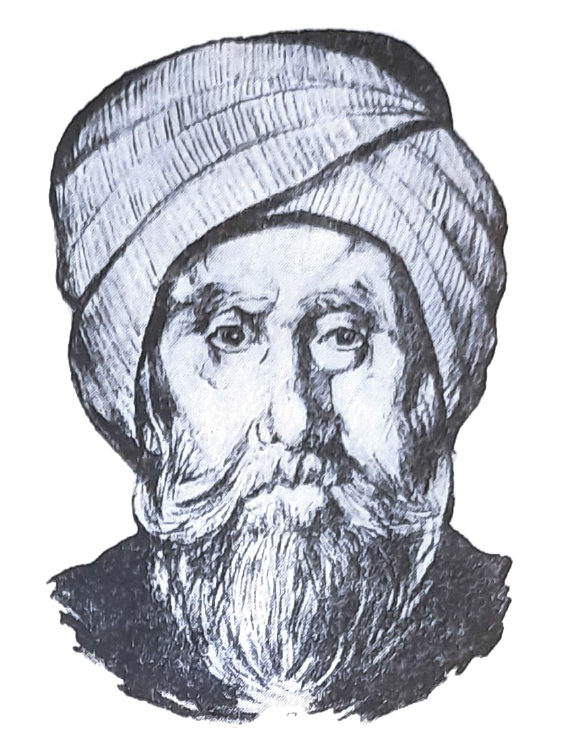
Al-Ghazali

The most successful form of Islamic atomism was in the Asharite school of Islamic theology, most notably in the work of the theologian al-Ghazali (1058–1111). In Asharite atomism, atoms are the only perpetual, material things in existence, and all else in the world is "accidental" meaning something that lasts for only an instant. Nothing accidental can be the cause of anything else, except perception, as it exists for a moment. Contingent events are not subject to natural physical causes, but are the direct result of God's constant intervention, without which nothing could happen. Thus nature is completely dependent on God, which meshes with other Asharite Islamic ideas on causation, or the lack thereof. Al-Ghazali also used the theory to support his theory of occasionalism. In a sense, the Asharite theory of atomism has far more in common with Indian atomism than it does with Greek atomism.

==== Averroes rejects atomism ====
Other traditions in Islam rejected the atomism of the Asharites and expounded on many Greek texts, especially those of Aristotle. An active school of philosophers in Al-Andalus, including the noted commentator Averroes (1126–1198 CE) explicitly rejected the thought of al-Ghazali and turned to an extensive evaluation of the thought of Aristotle. Averroes commented in detail on most of the works of Aristotle and his commentaries became very influential in Jewish and Christian scholastic thought.

=== Medieval Christendom ===
According to historian of atomism Joshua Gregory, no serious work was done with atomism from the time of Galen until Isaac Beeckman, Gassendi and Descartes resurrected it in the 17th century; "the gap between these two 'modern naturalists' and the ancient Atomists marked "the exile of the atom" and "it is universally admitted that the Middle Ages had abandoned Atomism, and virtually lost it."

==== Scholasticism ====
Although the ancient atomists' works were unavailable, scholastic thinkers gradually became aware of Aristotle's critiques of atomism as Averroes's commentaries were translated into Latin. Although the atomism of Epicurus had fallen out of favor in the centuries of Scholasticism, the minima naturalia of Aristotelianism received extensive consideration. Speculation on minima naturalia provided philosophical background for the mechanistic philosophy of early modern thinkers such as Descartes, and for the alchemical works of Geber and Daniel Sennert, who in turn influenced the corpuscularian alchemist Robert Boyle, one of the founders of modern chemistry.

A chief theme in late Roman and Scholastic commentary on this concept was reconciling minima naturalia with the general Aristotelian principle of infinite divisibility. Commentators like John Philoponus and Thomas Aquinas reconciled these aspects of Aristotle's thought by distinguishing between mathematical and "natural" divisibility. With few exceptions, much of the curriculum in the universities of Europe was based on such Aristotelianism for most of the Middle Ages.

==== Nicholas of Autrecourt ====
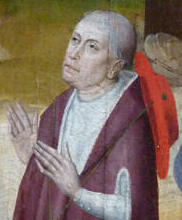
Nicholas of Autrecourt

In medieval universities there were, however, expressions of atomism. For example, in the 14th century Nicholas of Autrecourt considered that matter, space, and time were all made up of indivisible atoms, points, and instants and that all generation and corruption took place by the rearrangement of material atoms. The similarities of his ideas with those of al-Ghazali suggest that Nicholas may have been familiar with Ghazali's work, perhaps through Averroes' refutation of it.

== Atomist renaissance ==
=== 17th century ===
In the 17th century, a renewed interest arose in Epicurean atomism and corpuscularianism as a hybrid or an alternative to Aristotelian physics. The main figures in the rebirth of atomism were Isaac Beeckman, René Descartes, Pierre Gassendi, and Robert Boyle, as well as other notable figures.

==== Northumberland circle ====
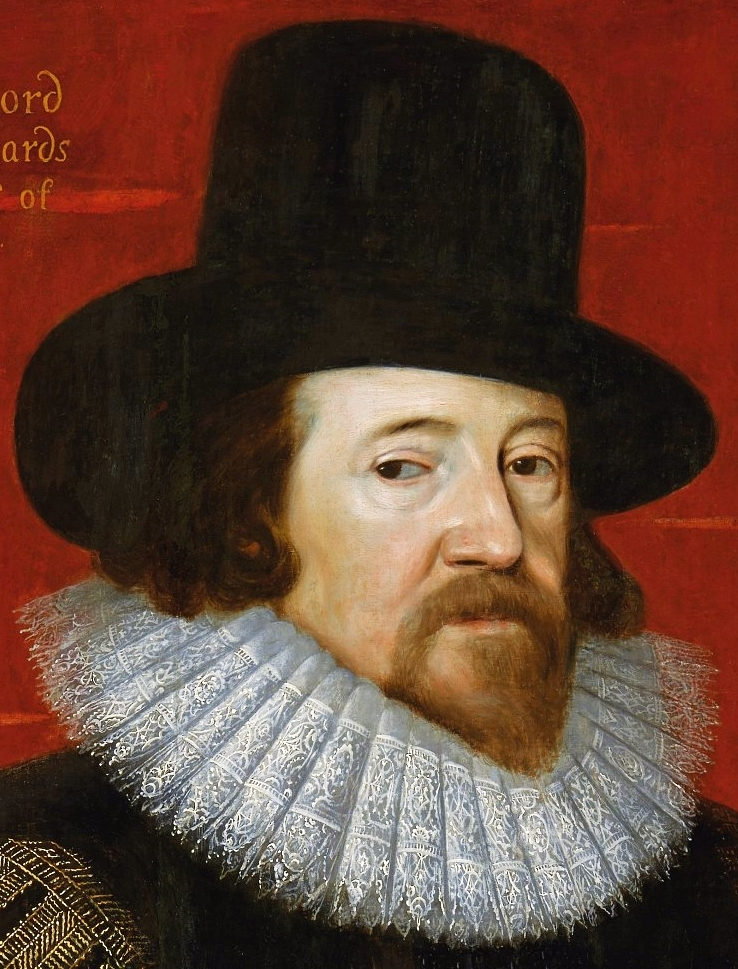
Francis Bacon

One of the first groups of atomists in England was a cadre of amateur scientists known as the Northumberland circle, led by Henry Percy, 9th Earl of Northumberland (1564–1632). Although they published little of account, they helped to disseminate atomistic ideas among the burgeoning scientific culture of England, and may have been particularly influential to Francis Bacon, who became an atomist around 1605, though he later rejected some of the claims of atomism. Though they revived the classical form of atomism, this group was among the scientific avant-garde: the Northumberland circle contained nearly half of the confirmed Copernicans prior to 1610 (the year of Galileo's The Starry Messenger). Other influential atomists of late 16th and early 17th centuries include Giordano Bruno, Thomas Hobbes (who also changed his stance on atomism late in his career), and Thomas Hariot. A number of different atomistic theories were blossoming in France at this time, as well.

==== Galileo Galilei ====
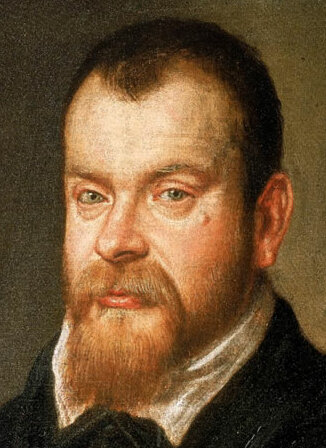
Galileo Galilei

Galileo Galilei (1564–1642) was an advocate of atomism in his 1612 Discourse on Floating Bodies (Redondi 1969). In The Assayer, Galileo offered a more complete physical system based on a corpuscular theory of matter, in which all phenomena—with the exception of sound—are produced by "matter in motion".

===== Perceived vs. real properties =====
Atomism was associated by its leading proponents with the idea that some of the apparent properties of objects are artifacts of the perceiving mind, that is, "secondary" qualities as distinguished from "primary" qualities. Galileo identified some basic problems with Aristotelian physics through his experiments. He utilized a theory of atomism as a partial replacement, but he was never unequivocally committed to it. For example, his experiments with falling bodies and inclined planes led him to the concepts of circular inertial motion and accelerating free-fall. The current Aristotelian theories of impetus and terrestrial motion were inadequate to explain these. While atomism did not explain the law of fall either, it was a more promising framework in which to develop an explanation because motion was conserved in ancient atomism (unlike Aristotelian physics).

==== René Descartes ====
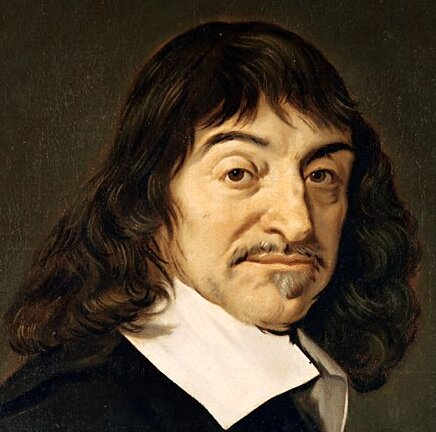
René Descartes

René Descartes' (1596–1650) "mechanical" philosophy of corpuscularism had much in common with atomism, and is considered, in some senses, to be a different version of it. Descartes thought everything physical in the universe to be made of tiny vortices of matter. Like the ancient atomists, Descartes claimed that sensations, such as taste or temperature, are caused by the shape and size of tiny pieces of matter. In Principles of Philosophy (1644) he writes: "The nature of body consists just in extension—not in weight, hardness, colour or the like." The main difference between atomism and Descartes' concept was the existence of the void. For him, there could be no vacuum, and all matter was constantly swirling to prevent a void as corpuscles moved through other matter. Another key distinction between Descartes' view and classical atomism is the mind/body duality of Descartes, which allowed for an independent realm of existence for thought, soul, and most importantly, God.

==== Pierre Gassendi ====
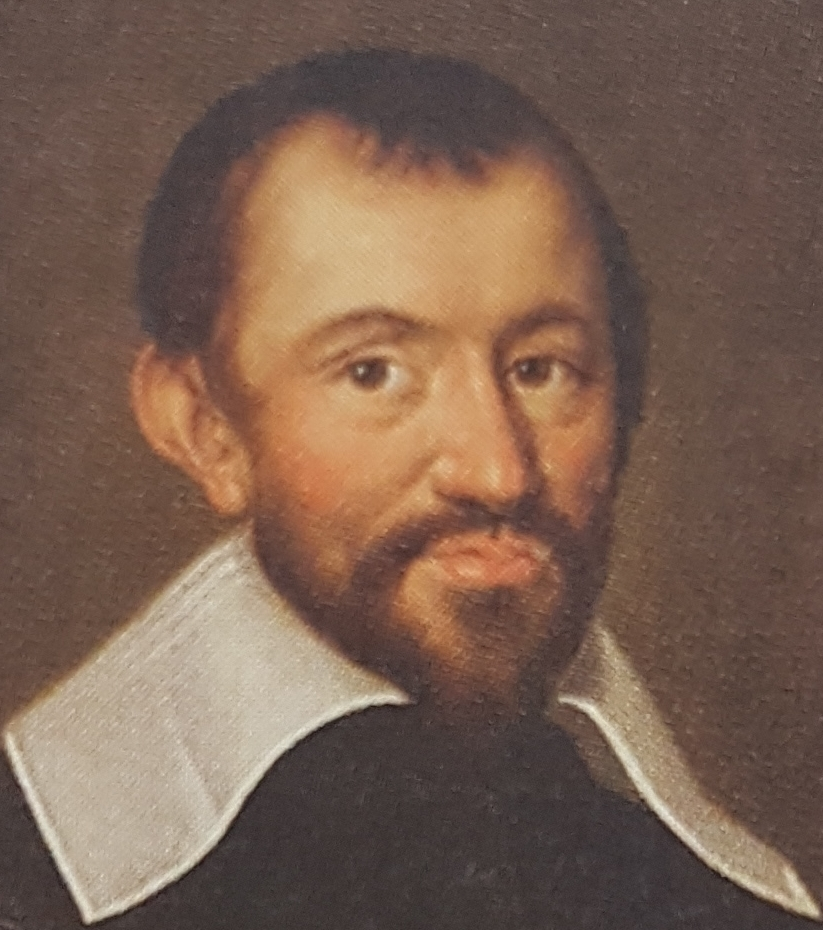
Pierre Gassendi

Pierre Gassendi (1592–1655) was a Catholic priest from France who was also an avid natural philosopher. Gassendi's concept of atomism was closer to classical atomism, but with no atheistic overtone. He was particularly intrigued by the Greek atomists, so he set out to "purify" atomism from its heretical and atheistic philosophical conclusions (Dijksterhius 1969). Gassendi formulated his atomistic conception of mechanical philosophy partly in response to Descartes; he particularly opposed Descartes' reductionist view that only purely mechanical explanations of physics are valid, as well as the application of geometry to the whole of physics.

==== Johann Chrysostom Magnenus ====
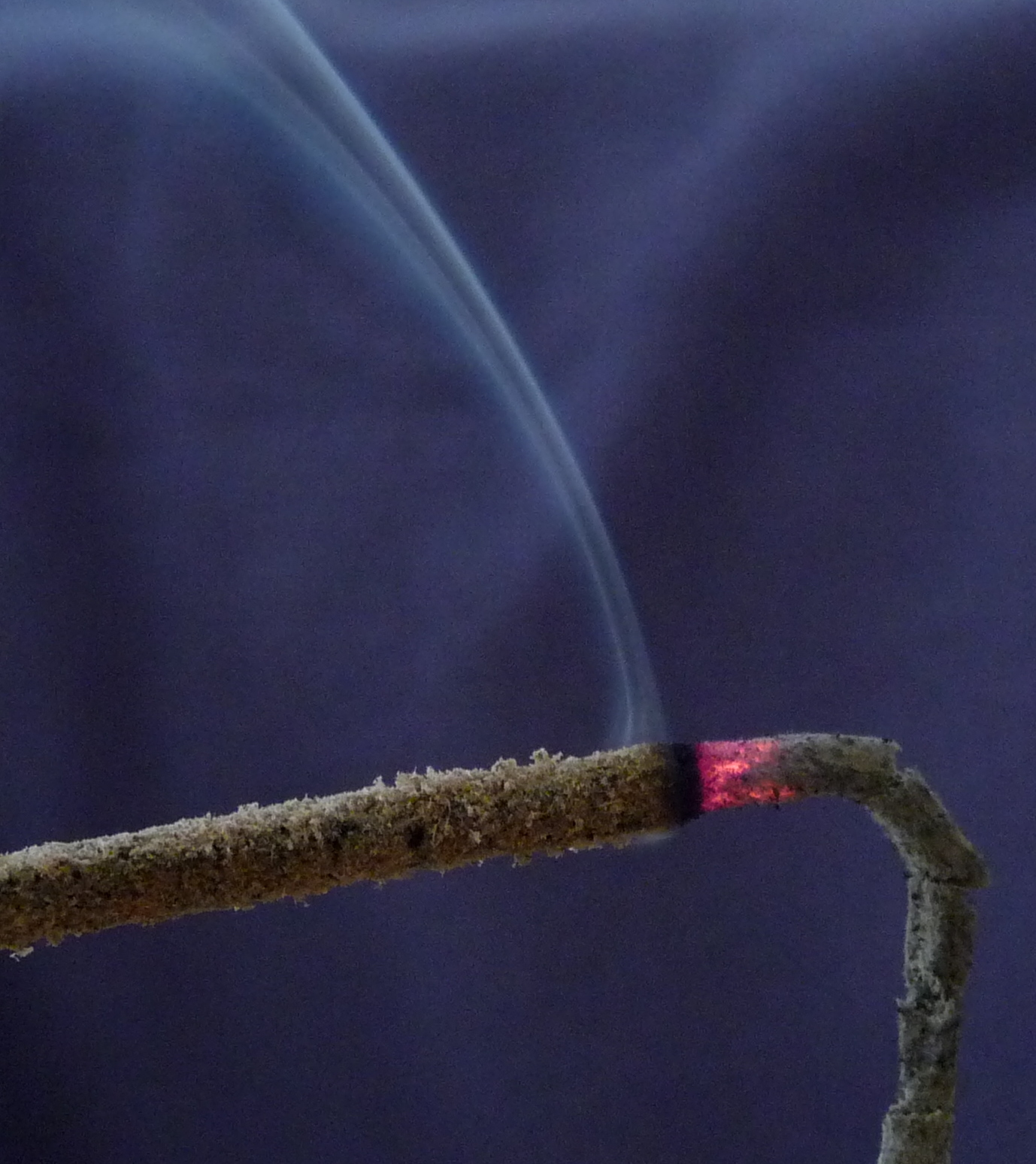
Burning incense

Johann Chrysostom Magnenus (c. 1590 – c. 1679) published his Democritus reviviscens in 1646. Magnenus was the first to arrive at a scientific estimate of the size of an "atom" (i.e. of what would today be called a molecule). Measuring how much incense had to be burned before it could be smelled everywhere in a large church, he calculated the number of molecules in a grain of incense to be of the order 10^{18}, only about one order of magnitude below the actual figure.

=== Atomism and corpuscularianism ===
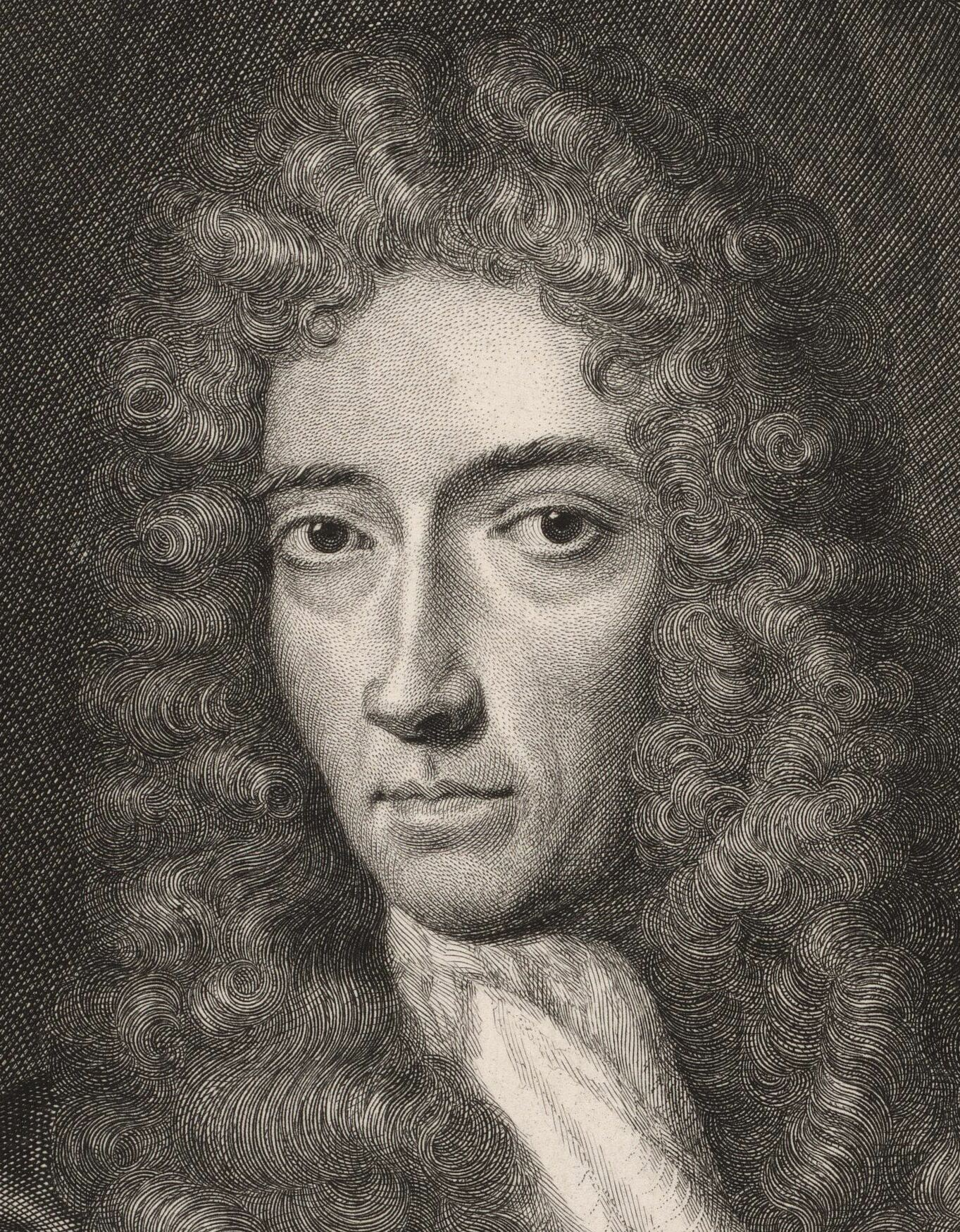
Robert Boyle

Corpuscularianism is similar to atomism, except that where atoms were supposed to be indivisible, corpuscles could in principle be divided. In this manner, for example, it was theorized that mercury could penetrate into metals and modify their inner structure, a step on the way towards transmutative production of gold. Corpuscularianism was associated by its leading proponents with the idea that some of the properties that objects appear to have are artifacts of the perceiving mind: 'secondary' qualities as distinguished from 'primary' qualities. Not all corpuscularianism made use of the primary-secondary quality distinction, however. An influential tradition in medieval and early modern alchemy argued that chemical analysis revealed the existence of robust corpuscles that retained their identity in chemical compounds (to use the modern term). William R. Newman has dubbed this approach to matter theory "chymical atomism," and has argued for its significance to both the mechanical philosophy and to the chemical atomism that emerged in the early 19th century.

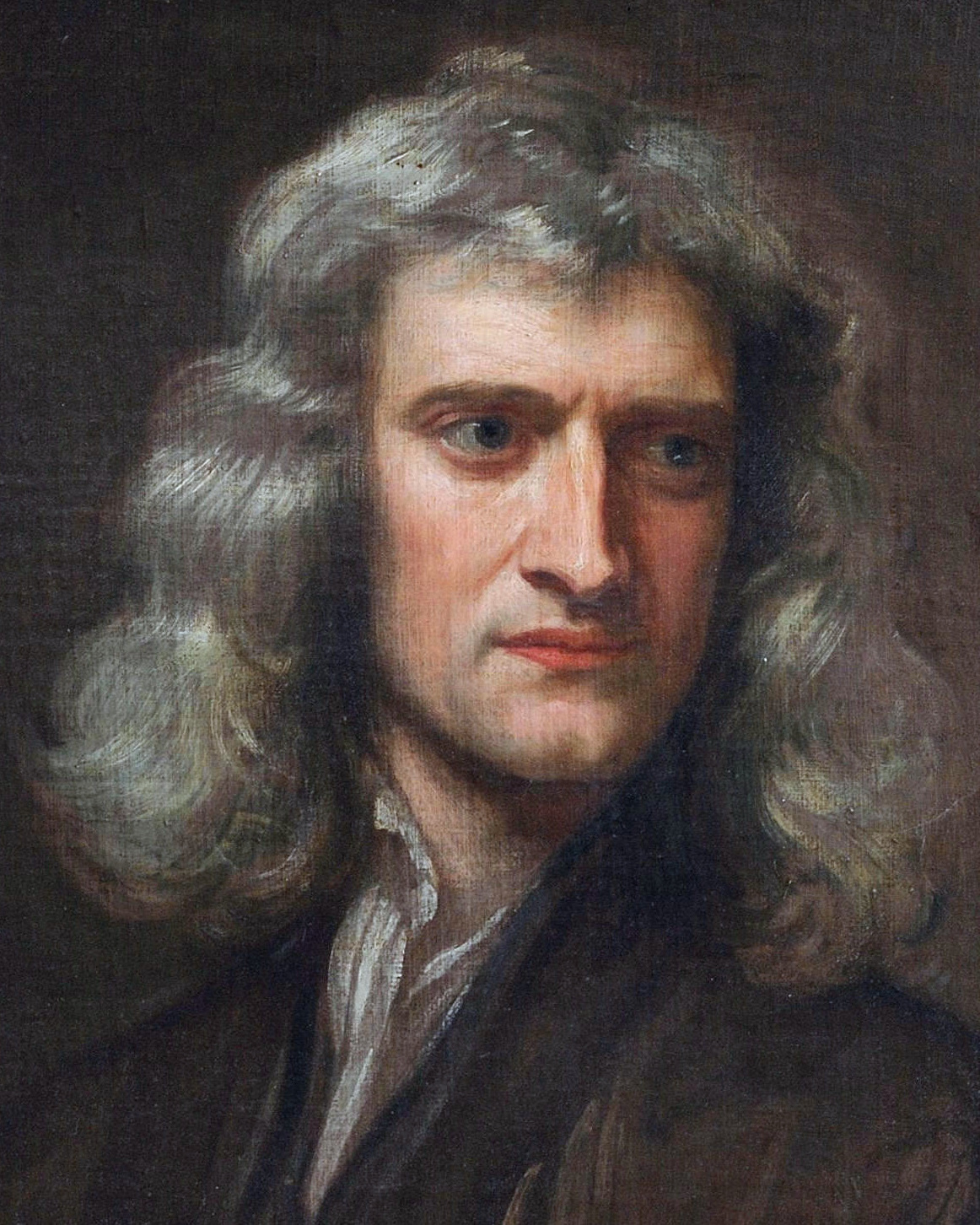
Isaac Newton

Corpuscularianism stayed a dominant theory over the next several hundred years and retained its links with alchemy in the work of scientists such as Robert Boyle (1627–1692) and Isaac Newton in the 17th century. It was used by Newton, for instance, in his development of the corpuscular theory of light. The form that came to be accepted by most English scientists after Robert Boyle was an amalgam of the systems of Descartes and Gassendi. In The Sceptical Chymist (1661), Boyle demonstrates problems that arise from chemistry, and offers up atomism as a possible explanation. The unifying principle that would eventually lead to the acceptance of a hybrid corpuscular–atomism was mechanical philosophy, which became widely accepted by physical sciences. Boyle referred to indivisible particles as minima naturalia or prima naturalia, and only very rarely used the term "atom".

==== Mikhail Lomonosov ====
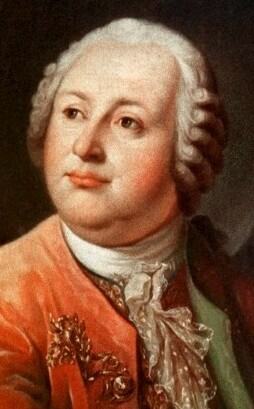
Mikhail Lomonosov

In his 1744 paper Meditations on the Cause of Heat and Cold, Russian polymath Mikhail Lomonosov specifically defined corpuscles as composite particles: "An element is part of a body which is not composed of any other smaller body ... A corpuscle is a collection of elements which constitute one small mass.." In a later study (1748), he uses the term "atom" instead of "element", and "particula" (particle) or "molecule" instead of "corpuscle."

== Modern atomic theory ==
=== Late 18th century ===
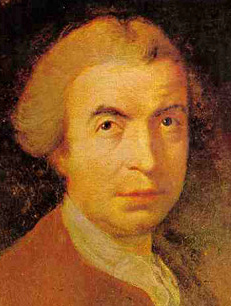
Roger Boscovich

By the late 18th century, the useful practices of engineering and technology began to influence philosophical explanations of the composition of matter. Those who speculated on the ultimate nature of matter began to verify their "thought experiments" with some repeatable demonstrations, when they could.

Ragusan polymath Roger Boscovich (1711–1787) provided the first general mathematical theory of atomism based on the ideas of Newton and Leibniz, but transforming them so as to provide a programme for atomic physics.

=== 19th century ===
==== John Dalton ====
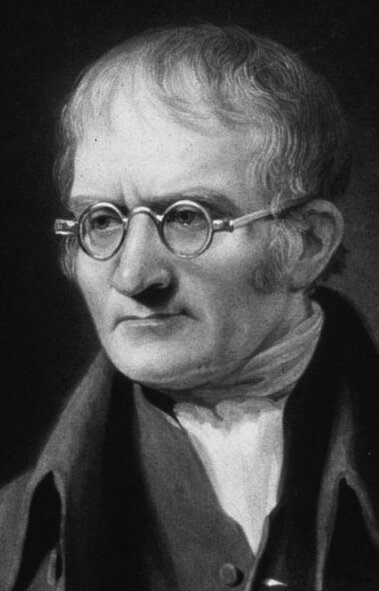
John Dalton

In 1808, English physicist John Dalton (1766–1844) assimilated the known experimental work of many people to summarize the empirical evidence on the composition of matter. He noticed that distilled water everywhere analyzed to the same elements, hydrogen and oxygen. Similarly, other purified substances decomposed to the same elements in the same proportions by weight.

Therefore we may conclude that the ultimate particles of all homogeneous bodies are perfectly alike in weight, figure, etc. In other words, every particle of water is like every other particle of water; every particle of hydrogen is like every other particle of hydrogen, etc.

Furthermore, he concluded that there was a unique atom for each element, using Lavoisier's definition of an element as a substance that could not be analyzed into something simpler. Thus, Dalton concluded the following.

Chemical analysis and synthesis go no farther than to the separation of particles one from another, and to their reunion. No new creation or destruction of matter is within the reach of chemical agency. We might as well attempt to introduce a new planet into the solar system, or to annihilate one already in existence, as to create or destroy a particle of hydrogen. All the changes we can produce, consist in separating particles that are in a state of cohesion or combination, and joining those that were previously at a distance.

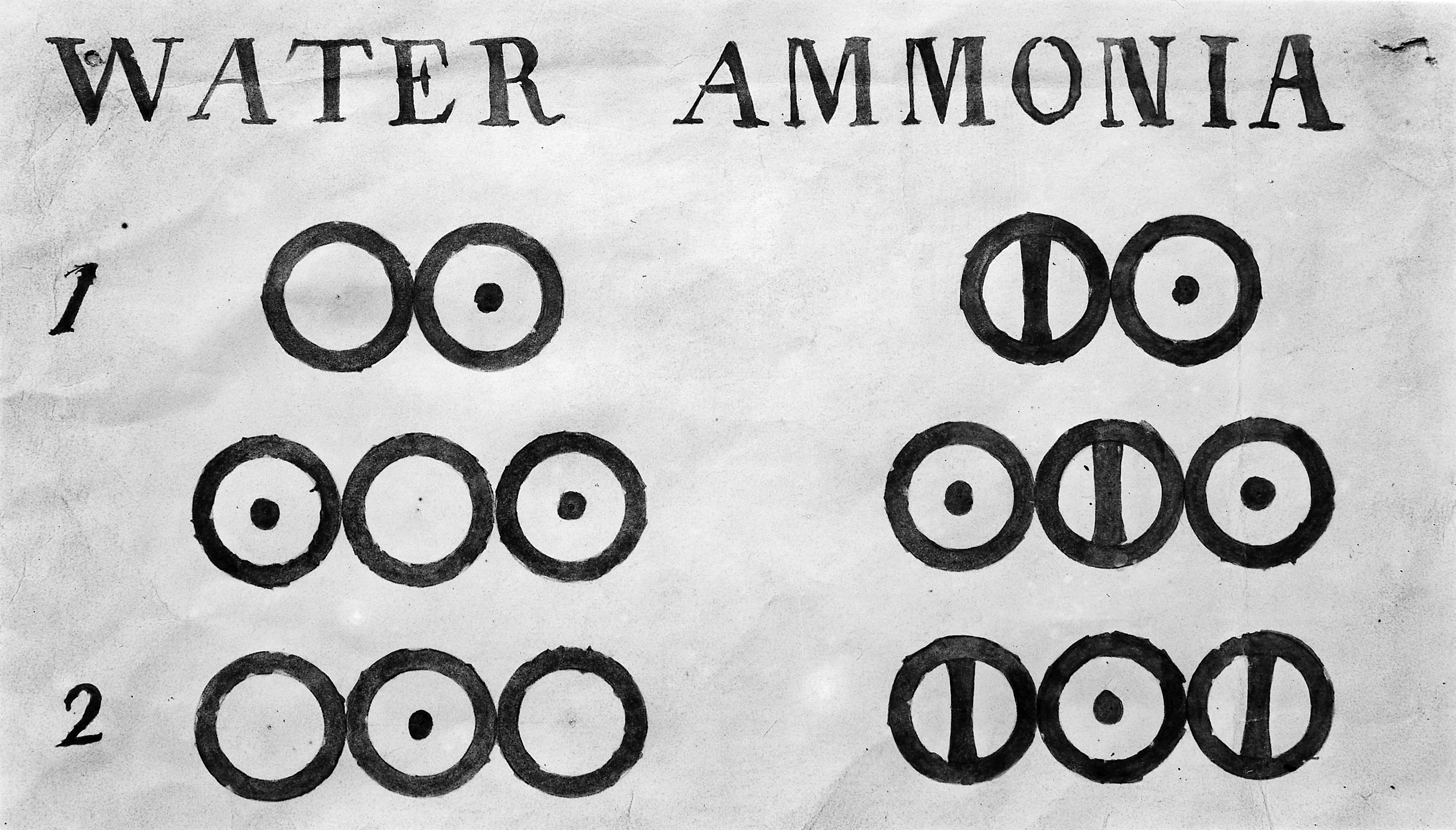
John Dalton's alternative formulae for water and ammonia

And then he proceeded to give a list of relative weights in the compositions of several common compounds, summarizing:

1st. That water is a binary compound of hydrogen and oxygen, and the relative weights of the two elementary atoms are as 1:7, nearly;

2nd. That ammonia is a binary compound of hydrogen and azote nitrogen, and the relative weights of the two atoms are as 1:5, nearly...

Dalton concluded that the fixed proportions of elements by weight suggested that the atoms of one element combined with only a limited number of atoms of the other elements to form the substances that he listed.

==== Atomic theory debate ====
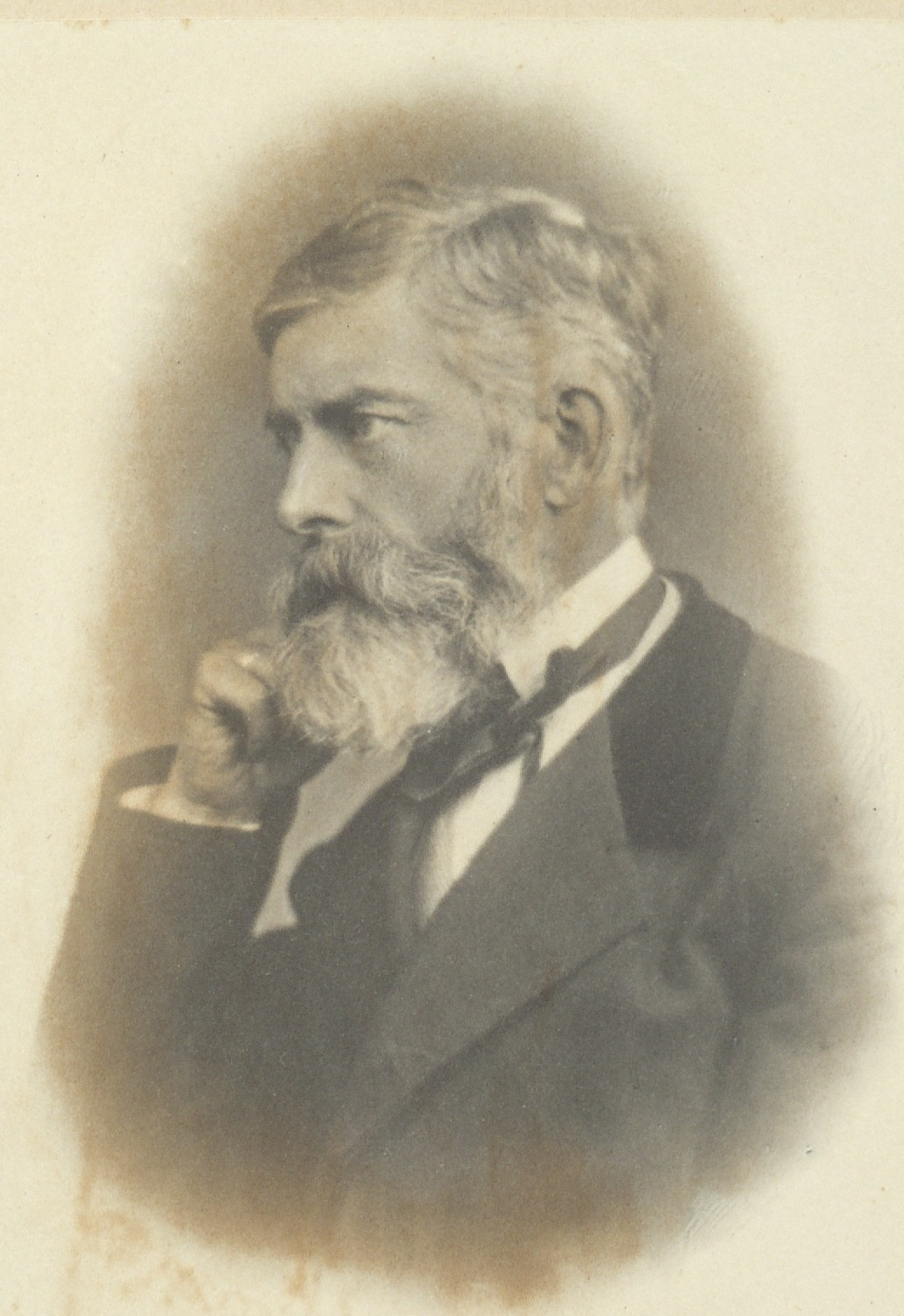
Alexander William Williamson

Dalton's atomic theory remained controversial throughout the 19th century. Whilst the Law of definite proportion was accepted, the hypothesis that this was due to atoms was not so widely accepted. For example, in 1826 when Sir Humphry Davy presented Dalton the Royal Medal from the Royal Society, Davy said that the theory only became useful when the atomic conjecture was ignored. English chemist Sir Benjamin Collins Brodie in 1866 published the first part of his Calculus of Chemical Operations as a non-atomic alternative to the atomic theory. He described atomic theory as a 'Thoroughly materialistic bit of joiners work'. English chemist Alexander Williamson used his Presidential Address to the London Chemical Society in 1869 to defend the atomic theory against its critics and doubters. This in turn led to further meetings at which the positivists again attacked the supposition that there were atoms. The matter was finally resolved in Dalton's favour in the early 20th century with the rise of atomic physics.

==== Vortex theory ====
From the 1860s to around 1890 a theory originally proposed by William Thomson and expanded by and JJ Thomson viewed atoms as vortices in a pervasive continuous fluid medium. The idea was to view matter as stable rotations in the frictionless fluid akin to smoke rings which were used to visually illustrate the concept. Descartes' earlier vortex theory envisioned swirling tiny particles, but in the Thomson's model the vortices existing in a continuous medium. The theory overlapped the rise of the theory of luminiferous aether in concept and in time frame but the two theories were not identical. While the theory had a significant impact on mathematics, inspiring the theory of knots for example, its own advocates eventually concluded that the vortices were not stable and furthermore the theory offered no account of phenomena such as magnetism and gravitation.

=== 20th century ===
==== Experimental verification ====
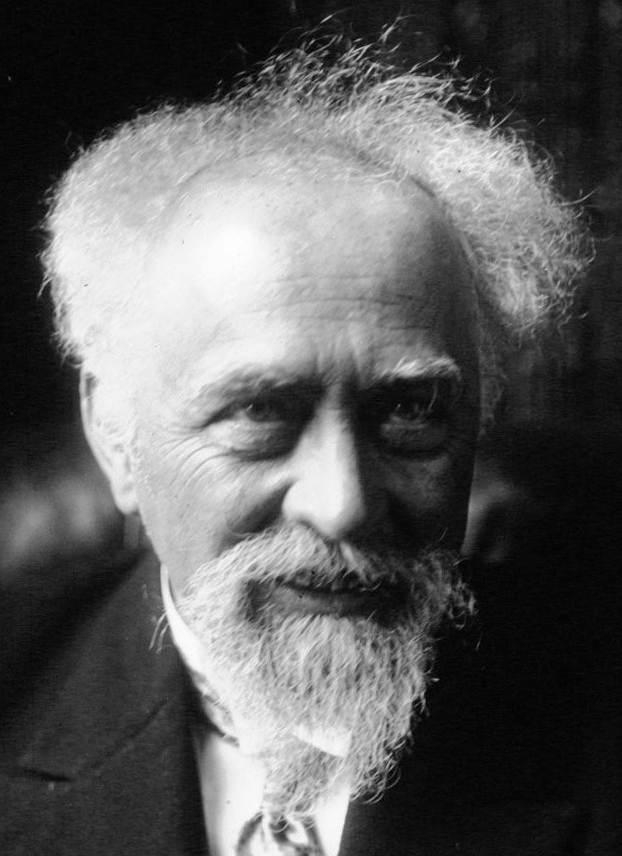
Jean Perrin

Atoms and molecules had long been theorized as the constituents of matter, and Albert Einstein published a paper in 1905 that explained how the motion that Scottish botanist Robert Brown had observed was a result of the pollen being moved by individual water molecules, making one of his first contributions to science. This explanation of Brownian motion served as convincing evidence that atoms and molecules exist, and was further verified experimentally by French physicist Jean Perrin (1870–1942) in 1908. Perrin was awarded the Nobel Prize in Physics in 1926 "for his work on the discontinuous structure of matter". The direction of the force of atomic bombardment is constantly changing, and at different times the particle is hit more on one side than another, leading to the seemingly random nature of the motion.

== See also ==
- Eliminative materialism
- First principle
- History of chemistry
- Mereological nihilism
- Montonen–Olive duality#Philosophical implications
- Ontological pluralism
- Physicalism
- Prima materia
- Process philosophy
