= Johann Chrysostom Magnenus =

French philosopher

Johann Chrysostom Magnenus (French Jean Chrysostôme Magnen, c. 1590 – c. 1679) was a physician and advocate of atomism.

He was born at Luxeuil in Burgundy. He took a medical degree at the University of Dôle.

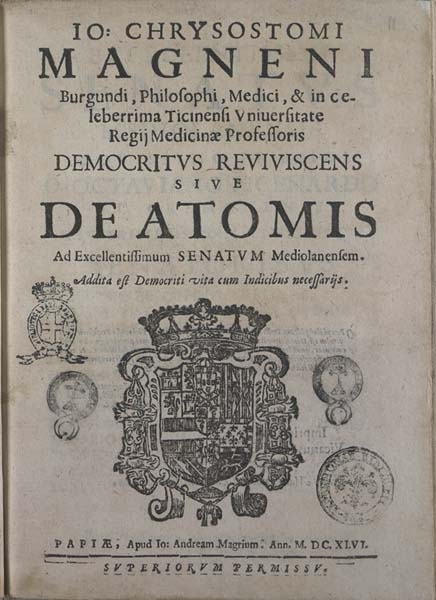
Title page of Democritus reviviscens (1646)

He joined the medical faculty at the University of Pavia, where he published his scientific work Democritus reviviscens sive de atomis in 1646. He cited Daniel Sennert, but his ideas were distinct from Sennert's and those of Democritus. He considered that atoms were the indivisible parts of three of the classical elements: earth, water and fire.

In 1646, Magnenus estimated the number of atoms in a piece of incense from an argument based on the sense of smell (if a fraction of the grain is burned, the number of particles can be estimated from the volume within which the scent is still perceptible). His estimate for the number of particles in a piece of incense "not larger than a pea" was of the order of 10^{18}. This estimate is remarkably accurate, within about three orders of magnitude of the true value (based on the number of molecules in the unburned incense) and thus only one order of magnitude off in linear dimension of the molecule. Magnenus was by far the earliest scholar to give a reasonable estimate for the size of a molecule; the first "modern" estimate was given more than 200 years later, in 1865, by Josef Loschmidt.

His other writings include De tabaco (1648), on the medical usage and effects of tobacco, and De manna liber singularis (1648). He apparently prescribed tobacco syrup as a standard remedy for his patients.
