= Buddhist atomism =

School of Buddhist philosophy

Buddhist atomism is a school of atomistic Buddhist philosophy that flourished on the Indian subcontinent during two major periods. During the first phase, which began to develop prior to the 6th century CE, Buddhist atomism had a very qualitative, Aristotelian-style atomic theory. This form of atomism identifies four kinds of atoms, corresponding to the standard elements. Each of these elements has a specific property, such as solidity or motion, and performs a specific function in mixtures, such as providing support or causing growth. Like the Hindus and Jains, the Buddhists were able to integrate a theory of atomism with their logical presuppositions.

According to Noa Ronkin, this kind of atomism was developed in the Sarvastivada and Sautrantika schools for whom material reality can be:

reduced to discrete momentary atoms, namely, the four primary elements. These momentary atoms, through their spatial arrangement and by their concatenation with prior and posterior atoms of the same type, create the illusion of persisting things as they appear in our everyday experience. Atomic reality is thus understood first and foremost as change, though not in the sense of a thing x transforming into y. That is, change itself is the very nature of atomic reality rather than its being made of enduring substances the qualities of which undergo change. Atoms that appear to endure are, in fact, a series of momentary events that ascend and fall in rapid succession and in accordance with causal relations. Unlike the atoms of the Vaishesika, the atoms of the Sarvastivada-Vaibhasika and the Sautrantika are not permanent: they come into being and cease from one moment to the next going through a process of birth, continuance, decay and destruction. Yet the material compounds that consist of these atoms are real, if only in the minimal, phenomenological sense.

The second phase of Buddhist atomism, which flourished in the 7th century CE, was very different from the first. Indian Buddhist philosophers, including Dharmakirti and Dignāga, considered atoms to be point-sized, durationless, and made of energy. In discussing Buddhist atomism, Stcherbatsky writes:

... The Buddhists denied the existence of substantial matter altogether. Movement consists for them of moments, it is a staccato movement, momentary flashes of a stream of energy... "Everything is evanescent," ... says the Buddhist, because there is no stuff ... Both systems [Sānkhya and later Indian Buddhism] share in common a tendency to push the analysis of Existence up to its minutest, last elements which are imagined as absolute qualities, or things possessing only one unique quality. They are called "qualities" (guna-dharma) in both systems in the sense of absolute qualities, a kind of atomic, or intra-atomic, energies of which the empirical things are composed. Both systems, therefore, agree in denying the objective reality of the categories of Substance and Quality, ... and of the relation of Inference uniting them. There is in Sānkhya philosophy no separate existence of qualities. What we call quality is but a particular manifestation of a subtle entity. To every new unit of quality corresponds a subtle quantum of matter which is called guna "quality", but represents a subtle substantive entity. The same applies to early Buddhism where all qualities are substantive ... or, more precisely, dynamic entities, although they are also called dharmas ("qualities").

== See also ==
- Impermanence (Buddhism) and Mindstream
- Atomism
- Dharmakirti
- Dignaga
- Kalapas
- Mereological nihilism
