= Kalapa (atomism) =

Kalapa or rupa-kalapa (from Sanskrit rūpa "form, phenomenon" and kalāpa "bundle") is a term in Theravada Buddhist phenomenology for the smallest units of physical matter, said to be about 1/46,656th the size of a particle of dust from a wheel of chariot. Kalapas are not mentioned in the earliest Buddhists texts, such as the Tripitaka, but only in the Abhidhammattha-sangaha, an Abhidhamma commentary dated to the 11th or 12th century, and as such not part of common Theravada doctrine.

According to the description found in the Abhidhammattha-sangaha, Kalapas are said to be invisible under normal circumstances but visible as a result of meditative samadhi. Kalapas are composed of eight inseparable elements of material essence in varying amounts which are: Pathavi (earth), Apo (water), Tejo (fire), Vayo (air), Vanna (color), Gandha (smell), Rasa (taste), and Oja (nutrition). The first four elements are called primary qualities, and are predominant in kalapas. The other four are secondary properties that derive from the primaries. The primary qualities are akin to the system of classical elements in Ancient Greece. Certain kalapas are said to also include additional elements, including sound, sex, body, mind-base and life.

In contemporary Buddhist meditation practice, the observation and analysis of kalapas is a type of vipassana practice that aims to allow direct observation of impermanence and non-self. Contemporary adherents of practices related to the observation and analysis of kalapas include U Ba Khin, S.N. Goenka and the Pa Auk Sayadaw. Mahasi Sayadaw in the 1980s expressed a belief that kalapas played a role in aging, death and rebirth.

== See also ==
- Buddhist atomism
