= Leucippus =

5th-century BCE Greek philosopher

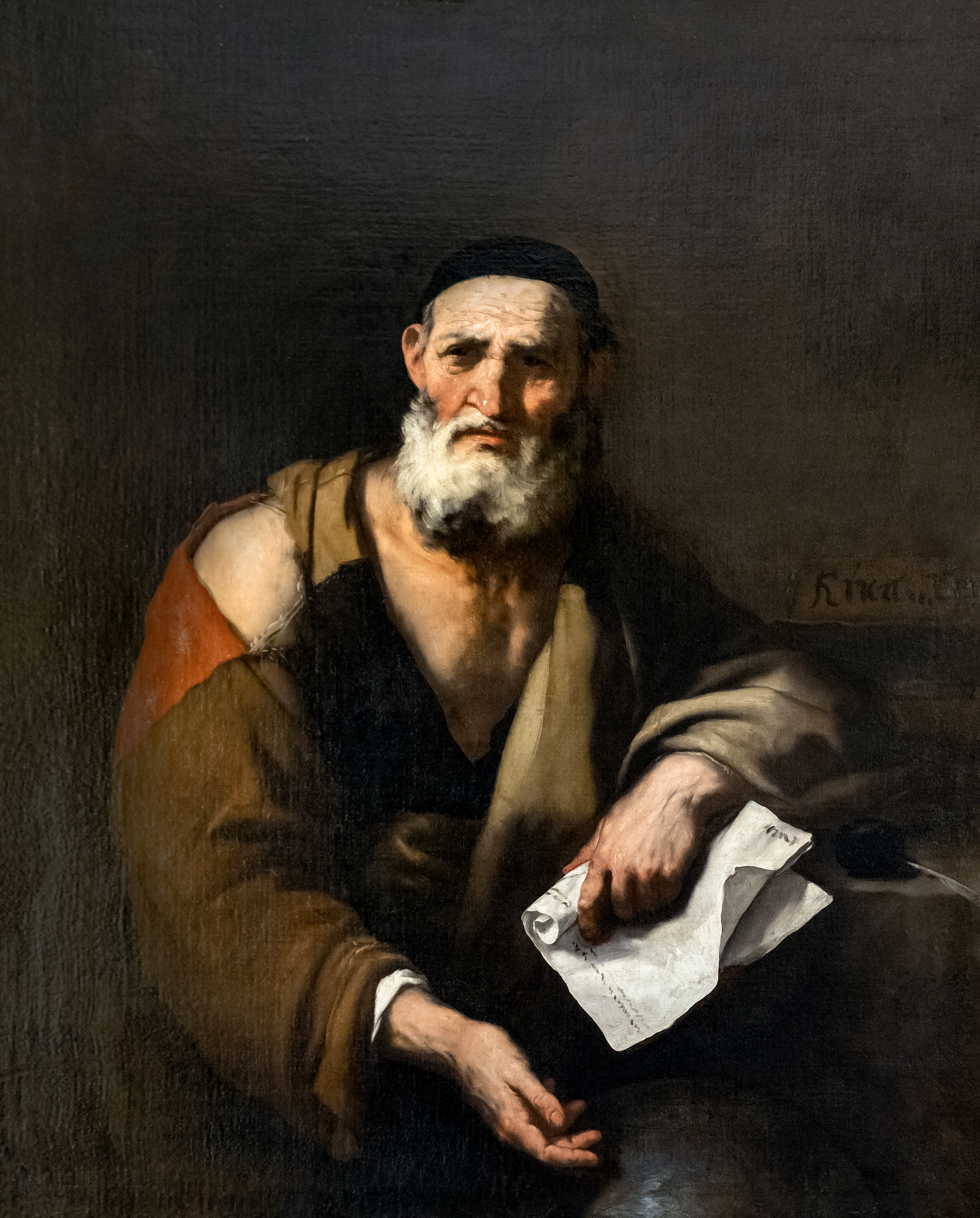
- Leucippus, as imagined by the 17th-century painter Luca Giordano
- Born: 5th century BCE; Abdera or Elea or Miletus

Philosophical work
- Era: Pre-Socratic philosophy
- Region: Western philosophy
- School: Atomism
- Notable students: Democritus
- Main interests: Metaphysics, cosmology
- Notable ideas: The concept of atoms

Leucippus (/luːˈsɪpəs/; Λεύκιππος, Leúkippos; fl. 5th century BCE) was a pre-Socratic Greek philosopher. He is traditionally credited as the founder of atomism, which he developed with his student Democritus. Leucippus divided the world into two entities: atoms, indivisible particles that make up all things, and the void, the nothingness that exists between the atoms. He developed his philosophy as a response to the Eleatics, who believed that all things are one and the void does not exist. Leucippus's ideas were influential in ancient and Renaissance philosophy. Leucippus was the first Western philosopher to develop the concept of atoms, but his ideas only bear a superficial resemblance to modern atomic theory.

Leucippus's atoms come in infinitely many forms and exist in constant motion, creating a deterministic world in which everything is caused by the collisions of atoms. Leucippus described the beginning of the cosmos as a vortex of atoms that formed the Earth, the Sun, the stars, and other celestial bodies. As Leucippus considered both atoms and the void to be infinite, he presumed that other worlds must exist as cosmoses are formed elsewhere. Leucippus and Democritus described the soul as an arrangement of spherical atoms, which are cycled through the body through respiration and create thought and sensory input.

The only records of Leucippus come from Aristotle and Theophrastus, ancient philosophers who lived after him, and little is known of his life. Most scholars agree that Leucippus existed, but some have questioned this, instead attributing his ideas purely to Democritus. Contemporary philosophers rarely distinguish their respective ideas. Two works are attributed to Leucippus (The Great World System and On Mind), but all of his writing has been lost with the exception of one sentence.

== Life ==
Almost nothing is known about the life of Leucippus. He was born in the first half of the 5th century BCE, and he presumably developed the philosophy of atomism during the 430s BCE, but the exact dates are unknown. Though he was a contemporary of the philosopher Socrates, Leucippus is categorized as a pre-Socratic philosopher because he continued the pre-Socratic tradition of physical inquiry that began with the Milesian philosophers. Leucippus is traditionally understood to have been a student of Zeno of Elea, though various ancient records have suggested Melissus of Samos, Parmenides, and Pythagoras as possible instructors of Leucippus. No students of Leucippus have been confirmed other than Democritus. Epicurus has been described as a student of Leucippus, but Epicurus has also been said to have denied the existence of Leucippus.

Abdera, Elea, and Miletus have all been suggested as places where Leucippus lived, but these are most likely described as his home city because of their associations with other philosophers: Miletus was associated with the Ionian School that influenced Leucippus, Elea was associated with the Eleatic philosophers whom Leucippus challenged, and Abdera was the home of his student Democritus. Some 20th-century classicists such as Walther Kranz and John Burnet have suggested that he lived in all three cities—that he was born in Miletus before studying under Zeno in Elea and then settling in Abdera.

== Philosophy ==
=== Atoms ===
Leucippus is credited with developing the philosophical school of atomism. He proposed that all things are made up of microscopic, indivisible particles that interact and combine to produce all the things of the world. The atoms postulated by Leucippus come in infinitely many shapes and sizes, although the size and shape of each atom is fixed and unchanging. They are in a state of constant motion and continuously change arrangements with one another. He reasoned that there must be infinite types of atoms because there is no reason why there should not be.

According to the 4th-century BCE philosopher Aristotle, Leucippus argued that logically there must be indivisible points in everything. His reasoning was that if an object was made entirely of divisible points, then it would not have any structure and it would be intangible. Leucippus developed atomism along with his student, Democritus; while Leucippus is credited with the philosophy's creation, Democritus is understood to have elaborated upon it and applied it to natural phenomena.

Two works are attributed to Leucippus: The Great World System and On Mind. The former may have originally been titled The World System and then later renamed to avoid confusion with Democritus's The Little World System. Leucippus's The Great World System has sometimes been attributed to Democritus. Only one extant fragment is attributed to Leucippus, taken from On Mind: "Nothing happens at random, but everything for a reason and by necessity". Leucippus believed that all things must happen deterministically, as the positions and motions of the atoms guarantee that they will collide in a certain way, invoking the principle of causality. This was reminiscent of the 6th-century BCE philosopher Anaximander's argument that movement is created by differences, and it was later codified by the 17th-century philosopher Gottfried Wilhelm Leibniz with the principle of sufficient reason. Leucippus rejected the idea that there was an intelligent force governing the universe.

=== Eleatics and the void ===
Leucippus's atomism was a direct response to Eleatic philosophy. The Eleatics believed that nothingness, or the void, cannot exist in its own right. They concluded that if there is no void, then there is no motion and all things must be one. Leucippus agreed with their logic, but he said that the void did exist, and he was therefore able to accept the existence of motion and plurality. Like the Eleatics, Leucippus believed that everything exists in an eternal state and nothing can come into or out of existence, applying this to both atoms and the void. Aristotle described Leucippus as saying that atoms are not an addition to the void, but that atoms and the void are two opposites that exist beside one another. The 6th-century CE philosopher Simplicius of Cilicia also wrote about this idea, but he attributed it to Democritus. According to the Christian author Lactantius, Leucippus compared atoms to the particles of floating dust that are visible in sunlight.

Leucippus's atomism kept the concepts of reality developed by the Eleatics, but it applied them to a physical explanation of the world. By moving away from the abstract points and units of geometry, he formed a possible solution to the paradoxes of motion created by Zeno of Elea, which held that indivisibility made motion impossible. Leucippus also contested the Eleatic argument against divisibility: that any divider between two objects can also be divided. He argued that the void is a divider that does not have being and therefore cannot be divided. Though Leucippus described atoms as being able to touch one another, Aristotle understood this to mean atoms being near one another, as Leucippus maintained that the void must exist between all atoms.

=== Soul and perception ===
Leucippus and Democritus proposed that heat, fire, and the soul are made of spherical atoms, as this shape would let them move past one another and cause the others to move more efficiently. They believed in a physical soul that drives motion in living things, and they described respiration as the process of expelling soul atoms and absorbing new ones. Death then coincides with the last breath, as soul atoms are no longer being replenished. Sleep is a similar state in which a reduced number of soul atoms are in the body.

Leucippus was the first philosopher to describe a theory of thought and perception. He described sensory input as a transfer between atoms, created when external atoms come into contact with the atoms of the soul. Leucippus said that sight is caused by a film of atoms emitted from an object, maintaining the shapes of its atoms and creating a reflection of the object in the viewer's eye. His description of vision was inspired by Empedocles, who formed a similar concept of objects emitting films of themselves. Leucippus posited that concepts such as color and texture are created by different arrangements of atoms, and that abstract concepts such as justice and wisdom are produced through the arrangement of soul atoms.

According to Epiphanius, Leucippus said that reasoned knowledge is impossible to obtain and only unreasoned belief exists. The 20th-century writer Constantine Vamvacas said that Leucippus rejected this belief, and that it was the Eleatic philosopher Parmenides who held it. According to Vamvacas, Leucippus and Democritus "believe that sense experience, however limited, constitutes objective knowledge of the physical world". The 20th-century scholar C. C. W. Taylor said that "we have no evidence to suggest that Leucippus was concerned with epistemological questions".

=== Cosmology ===
Leucippus said that the void extends infinitely, expanding across the entire universe. He also said that there is an infinite number of atoms, spread across the void. The Earth and the cosmos—including the Sun, the Moon, the stars, and anything else visible in the night sky—exist together in the void.

Leucippus said that the cosmos was created when a large group of atoms came together and swirled as a vortex. They shifted around each other until they were sorted "like to like". The larger atoms gathered in the center while the smaller ones were pushed to the edge. The smaller atoms became the celestial bodies of the cosmos. The larger atoms in the center came together as a membrane from which the Earth was formed. Ancient writers disagreed about what Leucippus meant when he described the membrane: Aetius said that the smaller atoms were part of the membrane, encasing the larger atoms, but Diogenes Laertius said that the larger atoms formed a membrane themselves and the smaller ones were excluded. Leucippus also believed that there were distant cosmoses in other parts of the void; this makes him the first known philosopher to propose the existence of other worlds besides Earth, though some ancient doxographers have attributed these ideas to the earlier Ionian philosophers.

Like other pre-Socratic philosophers, Leucippus believed that the Earth was in the center of the cosmos. He said that the other celestial bodies orbited around the Earth, with the Moon being the closest to the Earth and the Sun being the farthest. He described the stars as orbiting the fastest. While initially "moist and muddy", the stars dried and then ignited.

Leucippus adopted the idea of the Ionian philosophers that the Earth is flat. According to Aetius, Leucippus thought of the Earth as "drum-shaped", with a flat surface and some degree of depth. He said that the flat Earth is tilted on its horizontal axis so that the south is lower than the north, explaining that the northern region is colder than the southern region, and the cold compacted air of the north can better support the Earth's weight than the warm rarefied air of the south. Aetius also tells of Leucippus's explanation for thunder: that it is caused by fire being compressed in clouds and then bursting out.

Many early philosophers were confused by the fact that earthly objects fell downward while celestial objects moved in a curved trajectory. This prompted many of them to believe in a non-earthly substance that composes the celestial bodies. With his model of the cosmos, Leucippus was able to justify why these entities move differently even though they are made of the same substance. Leucippus gave no explanation for how motion began, for which he was criticized by Aristotle. It is unclear whether Leucippus considered vorticies to arise by chance or as a deterministic outcome.

== Legacy ==
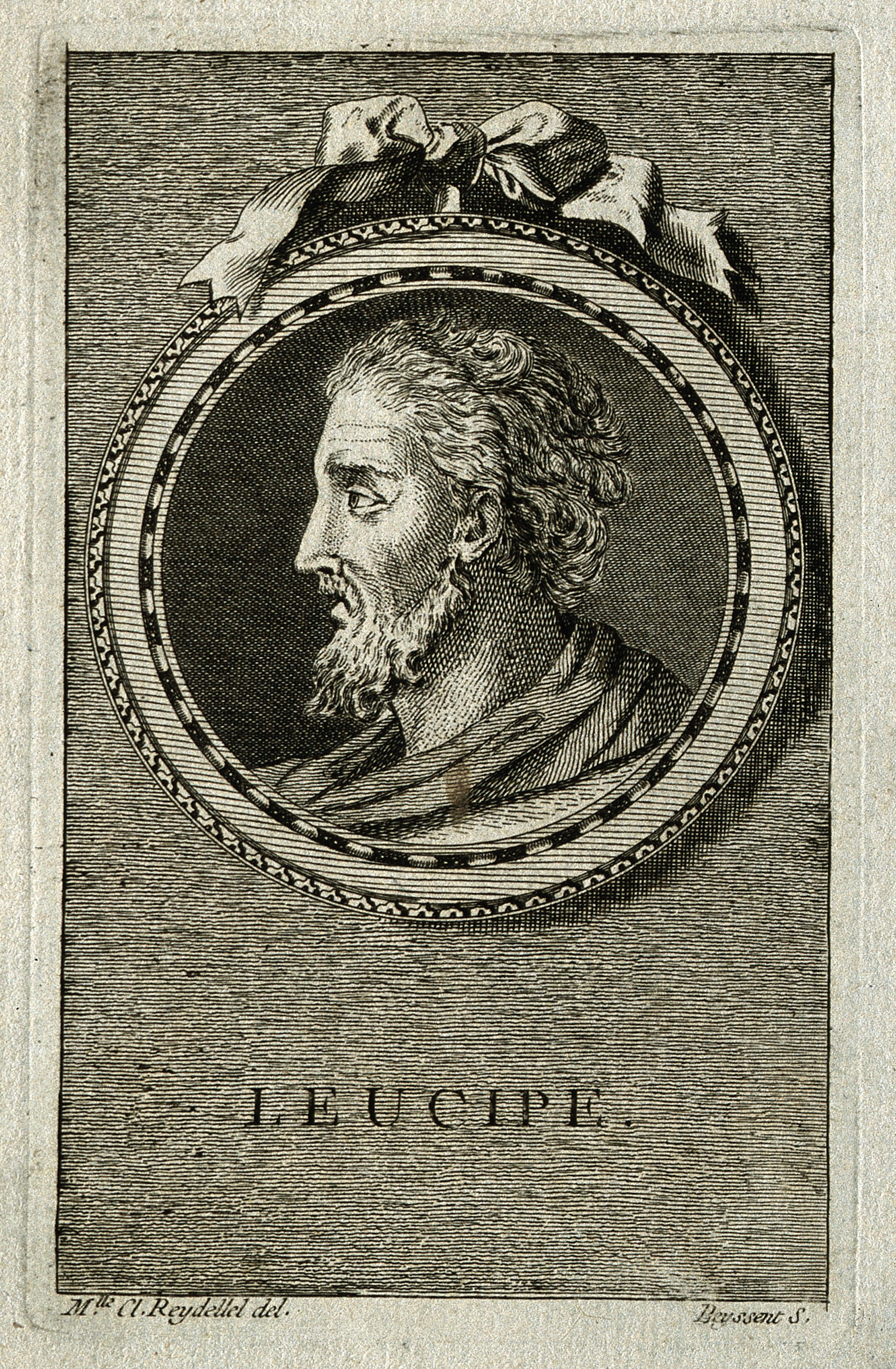
A 1773 line engraving of Leucippus

=== Ancient Greece ===
Modern understanding of Leucippus's role in the development of atomism comes from the writings of the ancient Greek philosophers Aristotle and Theophrastus. Aristotle's 4th-century BCE record of Leucippus and Democritus's philosophy is the oldest surviving source on the subject, though he did not distinguish who developed which atomist ideas. Aetius also wrote about Leucippus, but it was well after Leucippus's own time and derivative of previous writings on the subject. Some later histories of philosophy omitted Leucippus entirely. Since ancient times, Leucippus has languished in obscurity compared to Democritus, and since the earliest records of atomist thought, it has been common practice to consider the ideas of Leucippus and Democritus collectively rather than attempting to distinguish them.

The atomist philosophy of Leucippus and Democritus influenced Greek philosophy for centuries, particularly in the work of Aristotle and Epicurus. Aristotle was critical of atomism. He questioned why stone should fall but fire should rise if they are both made of the same material. According to Diogenes Laertius, Diogenes of Apollonia's interpretation of the void may have been inspired by Leucippus. Plato explored cosmological ideas similar to those of Leucippus in the dialogue Timaeus.

=== Modern era ===
Ancient atomism was revived in the 16th and 17th centuries, especially by proponents of the mechanical philosophy such as Pierre Gassendi (1592–1655) and Robert Boyle (1627–1691). Nevertheless, in practice experimental chemists such as Boyle rather relied on the tradition of corpuscularianism which had developed in medieval alchemy and ultimately goes back to works such as Aristotle's Meteorology IV. Throughout the 18th century chemists worked independently from philosophical atomism, which only changed when John Dalton (1766–1844) proposed a form of atomism that was rooted in chemical experiment.

Although Leucippus' ideas form an important historical precedent for the concept of atoms in general, they only bear a superficial resemblance to modern atomic theory. Leucippus's philosophy was conjecture based on a priori evidence, while modern atomic theory is supported by empirical evidence found through the scientific method. The main practical difference between Leucippus's atomism and modern atomic theory is the introduction of non-tangible phenomena such as mass–energy equivalence and fundamental forces. Instead of the purely material atoms of Leucippus, modern atomic theory shows that fundamental forces combine subatomic particles into atoms and link atoms together into molecules. The 20th-century physicist Werner Heisenberg argued that Plato's theory of forms was closer to the 20th-century understanding of physics than Leucippus's conception of atoms, saying that modern atoms are more like the intangible Platonic forms than the discrete material units of Leucippus.

==== Scholarship on Leucippus ====
Modern philosophy generally takes more interest in Leucippus's concept of atoms than his cosmology. Two major systems have been created to distinguish Leucippus and Democritus. The 20th-century philosopher Adolf Dyroff developed a set of distinctions between Leucippus and Democritus: he proposed that Leucippus was responsible for the atomist response to the Eleatics while Democritus responded to the Sophists and that Leucippus was a cosmologist while Democritus was a polymath. The 20th-century classicist Cyril Bailey proposed another system to differentiate the two philosophers, attributing atomism and belief in the void to Leucippus while attributing The Great Cosmology to Democritus as an application of Leucippus's philosophy. Unlike Democritus, Leucippus is only known to have studied cosmology and physics.

=== Historicity ===
According to Diogenes Laertius, Epicurus alleged that Leucippus never existed—an allegation that triggered extensive philosophical debate. Most modern philosophers agree that Leucippus existed, but there is disagreement on whether his work can be meaningfully distinguished from that of Democritus. In 2008, the philosopher Daniel Graham wrote that no significant work on the historicity of Leucippus has been produced since the early 20th century, arguing that "recent scholarship tends to avoid the question as much as possible".

Scholars who maintain that Leucippus existed argue that he only taught orally or that any written works he produced were never meant for publication. The 20th-century classicist John Burnet proposed an alternate reading of Epicurus's claims, according to which Epicurus may have been saying that Leucippus was not worth discussing as a philosopher, not that he literally did not exist. Supporting this argument is that Epicurus considered ethics to be foundational to philosophy, and Leucippus had no teachings on that subject. Among scholars who argue against Leucippus's existence, alternate ideas have been proposed: Leucippus may have been a pseudonym of Democritus, or he may have been a character in a dialogue. Modern scholars who have rejected the existence of Leucippus include Erwin Rohde, Paul Natorp, Paul Tannery, P. Bokownew, Ernst Howald, Herman De Ley, Adolf Brieger, and Wilhelm Nestle.

The existence of Leucippus was an issue in 19th-century German philosophy, where it spawned a debate between Rohde, Natorp, and Hermann Alexander Diels. Rhode believed that even in the time of Epicurus there was no evidence of Leucippus's existence, and there was therefore no purpose in attributing the atomism of Democritus to an unknown figure such as Leucippus, rejecting Theophrastus's account. Natorp likewise rejected that Diogenes of Apollonia was preceded by Leucippus. Diels affirmed the account of Theophrastus and produced writings criticizing Rhode and Natorp. The problem was significant enough that it was given its own name in German: die Leukipp-frage (transl. the Leucippus problem).

== Works ==
Two works are attributed to Leucippus.

- Μέγας διάκοσμος (Megas Diakosmos; translated as The Great World System, The Great Cosmology, or The Great World Order)
- Περί Νού (Peri Nou; translated as On Mind) – This work includes the only surviving fragment written by Leucippus: "οὐδὲν χρῆμα μάτην γίνεται, ἀλλὰ πάντα ἐκ λόγου τε καὶ ὑπ’ ἀνάγκης" (transl. "Nothing happens at random, but everything for a reason and by necessity.")

== See also ==
- Kanada – An ancient Indian philosopher who also developed an early atomist philosophy
