= Daniel Sennert =

German physician and academic writer (1572–1637)

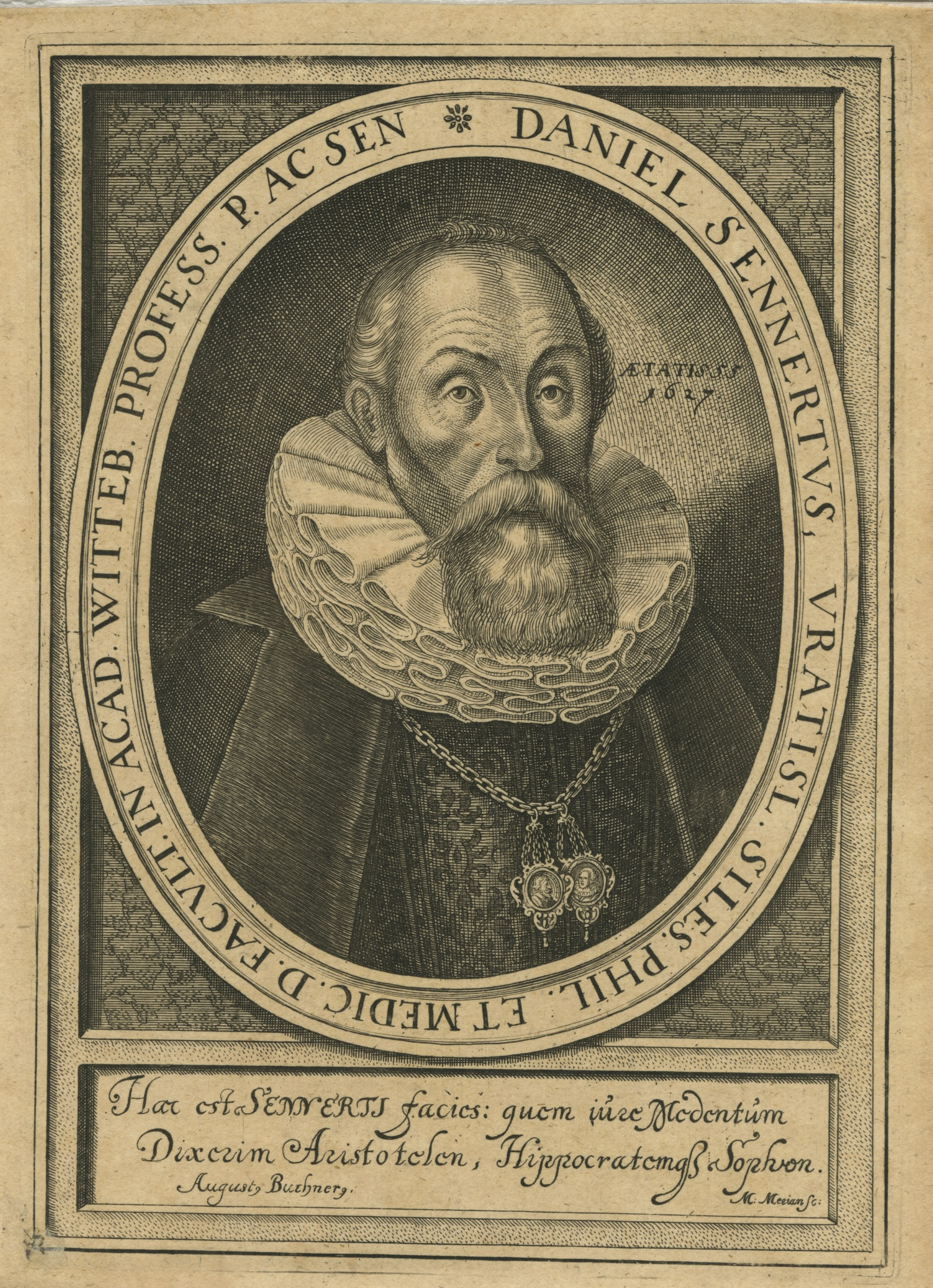
- Born: 25 November 1572; Breslau, Habsburg monarchy
- Died: 21 July 1637 (aged 64); Wittenberg
- Education: University of Wittenberg
- Scientific career
- Fields: Medicine
- Workplaces: University of Wittenberg
- Academic advisors: Jan Jesenius
- Notable students: Werner Rolfinck

Daniel Sennert (25 November 1572 – 21 July 1637) was a German physician and a prolific academic writer, especially in the field of alchemy or chemistry. He held the position of professor of medicine at the University of Wittenberg for many years.

== Biographical information ==
Daniel Sennert was born in 1572 in the city of Breslau (now Wrocław, Poland), at the time part of the Habsburg monarchy. His father, Nicolaus Sennert, was a shoemaker from Laehn, Silesia.

Sennert attended the University of Wittenberg and received his master's degree in 1598 and his medical degree in 1601. In his early work, he demonstrated an avoidance of alchemical theory and an acceptance of Aristotelian theory. However, within a decade of receiving his medical degree he had changed to accepting alchemical transmutation and experimentation as valid. He published a number of popular books on alchemy and chemistry, several of which received a number of reprintings and translations. He served on the faculty at the University of Wittenberg for the rest of his life, serving six times as the Dean of the medical faculty at Wittenberg, and also served as the physician to many aristocrats and rulers, including John George I, Elector of Saxony. He died of the plague in 1637 in Wittenberg.

== Scientific contributions ==
Sennert is notable for his contributions to the development of an early version of atomic theory. Specifically, he forms an intermediate bridge between the works of Geber and the more recognized Corpuscularianists such as Robert Boyle. Corpuscularianism differs from modern atomic theory in a number of significant ways, most noticeably a lack of a mathematical argument for its existence, something Sennert specifically rejected. Sennert is an intermediate step between corpuscular particle theory and Aristotelian forms. The same works that are often cited as demonstrating his early atomist views also emphasize the importance of substantial forms. Sennert's theories were based on an experiential and experimental evidence that he gathered both from eyewitness accounts and his own laboratory experience. "Besides giving one of the earliest accounts of scarlatina, Sennert added to the knowledge of scurvy, dysentery and alcoholism. He was an able clinician but a believer in witchcraft."

One of Sennert's most notable experiments was a variation on the "reduction to the pristine state." Taking an alloy of gold and silver, the silver was dissolved from the alloy in aqua fortis. In the classic "reduction to the pristine state," the silver was then precipitated out of the aqua fortis by the addition of salt of tartar and then heated in a crucible to return it to its recognizable metallic form. Sennert's innovation on this experiment was the addition of pouring the silver-aqua fortis solution through a paper filter before precipitating the silver from the solution. This experiment was used as evidence that the silver remained in the mixture in the form of minuscule particles, rather than dissolving into its Aristotelian components. It appears to have inspired similar experiments on the part of Robert Boyle and others used to establish acceptance of Corpuscularianism.

== Publications ==
- Institutiones medicinae (Wittenberg, 1611)
- Epitome scientiae naturalis (1618)
- De chymicorum cum Aristotelicis et Galenicis consensu ac dissensu (Wittenberg, 1619)
- Practicae medicinae (Wittenberg, 1635) in 6 vols.
- Hypomnemata physicae (Frankfurt, 1636)
