= The Void (philosophy) =

Philosophical concept of emptiness

The concept of "The Void" in philosophy encompasses the ideas of nothingness and emptiness, a notion that has been interpreted and debated across various schools of metaphysics. In ancient Greek philosophy, the Void was discussed by thinkers like Democritus, who saw it as a necessary space for atoms to move, thereby enabling the existence of matter. Contrasting this, Aristotle famously denied the existence of a true Void, arguing that nature inherently avoids a vacuum.

In Eastern philosophical traditions, the Void takes on significant spiritual and metaphysical meanings. In Buddhism, Śūnyatā refers to the emptiness inherent in all things, a fundamental concept in understanding the nature of reality. In Taoism, the Void is represented by Wuji, the undifferentiated state from which all existence emerges, embodying both the potential for creation and the absence of form.

Throughout the history of Western thought, the Void has also been explored in the context of existentialism and nihilism, where it often symbolizes the absence of intrinsic meaning in life and the human condition's confrontation with nothingness. Modern scientific discussions have further engaged with the concept of the Void, particularly in the study of quantum mechanics and cosmology, where it is linked to ideas such as the quantum vacuum and the structure of the universe.

In Western esotericism, aphairesis ("clearing aside"), or the via negativa, is a method used to approach the transcendent 'Ground of Being' by systematically negating all finite concepts and attributes associated with the divine. This process allows mystics to move beyond the limitations of human understanding and language, ultimately seeking a direct experience of the divine as the ineffable source of all existence, beyond any specific attributes or definitions.

== History ==
The concept of the Void has its origins in ancient Greek philosophy, where it was central to discussions on the nature of the cosmos and space. Parmenides suggested it did not exist and used this to argue for the non-existence of change, motion, and differentiation, among other things. In response to Parmenides, Democritus, one of the early proponents of atomism, posited that the universe was composed of atoms moving through the Void. According to Democritus, the Void was a necessary empty space that allowed for the movement and interaction of atoms, making it essential for the existence of matter itself. This view framed the Void as a real and foundational component of the universe, contrasting with the notion of it being mere nothingness.

Aristotle, in contrast, rejected the existence of a true Void, arguing that nature abhors a vacuum (horror vacui). In Book IV of Physics, Aristotle contended that the Void (Greek: κενόν), understood as an absolute absence of matter, could not exist because it would contradict the natural laws governing movement and change. He believed that movement required a medium through which it could occur, and a completely empty space would prevent such movement. This Aristotelian view became highly influential, shaping medieval and Renaissance perspectives on the nature of space and matter.

Stoic philosophers admitted the subsistence of four incorporeals among which they included void. Diogenes wrote that "Outside of the world is diffused the infinite void, which is incorporeal. By incorporeal is meant that which, though capable of being occupied by body, is not so occupied. The world has no empty space within it, but forms one united whole. This is a necessary result of the sympathy and tension which binds together things in heaven and earth." Chrysippus discusses the Void in his work On Void and in the first book of his Physical Sciences; so too Apollophanes in his Physics, Apollodorus, and Posidonius in his Physical Discourse, book ii."

During the medieval period, Christian theologians engaged with the concept of the Void from a metaphysical and theological perspective. Classical theologians like Thomas Aquinas integrated Aristotelian philosophy with Christian theology, arguing that God's omnipresence precluded the existence of a Void. For Aquinas, the idea of a Void was incompatible with the belief in a God who is present everywhere, thus reinforcing the rejection of any absolute emptiness in creation.

Despite Aristotle's rejection, the concept of the Void reemerged during the Renaissance and early modern period, particularly in the context of scientific inquiry. The development of vacuum experiments by scientists like Evangelista Torricelli in the 17th century challenged Aristotelian physics by demonstrating the possibility of creating a vacuum, thereby reigniting philosophical discussions about the nature of the Void and its place in the physical world. These experiments laid the groundwork for later scientific advancements, including the study of space and the vacuum in modern physics. There were questions as to whether the Void was truly nothing, or if it was in fact filled with something, with theories of aether being suggested in the 18th century to fill the Void.

== In Eastern philosophy ==
The concept of the Void holds significant spiritual and metaphysical importance in Eastern philosophy, particularly in Buddhism and Taoism. While each tradition interprets the Void differently, both see it as central to understanding the nature of reality and existence.

=== Buddhism: Śūnyatā ===
In Buddhism, the concept of the Void is most closely associated with Śūnyatā, often translated as "emptiness". This idea is central to Mahayana Buddhist philosophy and is most elaborately discussed in the works of Nagarjuna, a foundational figure in the Madhyamaka school. Śūnyatā refers to the absence of inherent existence in all phenomena; nothing possesses an independent, permanent self-nature. Instead, everything exists interdependently, arising and ceasing due to a web of causes and conditions. This understanding is meant to free practitioners from attachment and the delusion of a permanent self, leading to enlightenment.

Nagarjuna's analysis in the Mūlamadhyamakakārikā (Fundamental Verses on the Middle Way) elaborates on Śūnyatā by deconstructing various concepts and phenomena to show that they lack intrinsic essence. This deconstruction is not nihilistic; rather, it opens the way to seeing reality as a dynamic interplay of conditions, without clinging to any fixed viewpoints. Śūnyatā, therefore, is both a philosophical insight and a meditative realization that leads to the understanding of the true nature of reality.

=== Taoism: Wuji and Taiji ===
In Taoism, the concept of the Void is represented by Wuji (無極), which denotes a state of undifferentiated emptiness or non-being. Wuji is the source of all existence, preceding the dualistic manifestation of Taiji (太極), the Supreme Ultimate, which gives rise to the interplay of yin and yang. This cosmological framework is central to Taoist metaphysics, where Wuji symbolizes the limitless potential and the unmanifest state from which all things emerge and to which they ultimately return.

The Tao Te Ching, attributed to Laozi, discusses the concept of the Tao (道) as the ultimate source and underlying principle of the universe, which can be understood as synonymous with Wuji. The Tao is described as something that cannot be named or defined, embodying the qualities of the Void—emptiness, potentiality, and the origin of all phenomena. This understanding of the Void as the root of existence reflects a non-dualistic view, where the apparent multiplicity of the world is ultimately grounded in an ineffable, empty source.

Zhou Dunyi, a Song dynasty philosopher, synthesized Taoist and Confucian ideas in his Taijitu shuo (Explanation of the Diagram of the Supreme Ultimate), where he describes Wuji and Taiji as interconnected aspects of the same reality. Wuji represents the boundless void from which the dynamism of Taiji emerges, leading to the generation of the yin-yang duality and, consequently, the entire cosmos.

== In modern philosophy ==
The concept of the Void takes on new dimensions in modern philosophy, particularly in the realms of existentialism and nihilism. These philosophical movements, emerging primarily in the 19th and 20th centuries, grapple with the implications of the Void for human existence, meaning, and morality.

=== Nihilism ===
Nihilism, particularly as articulated by Friedrich Nietzsche, presents a more radical confrontation with the Void, often characterized by the rejection of all moral, religious, and metaphysical beliefs. Nietzsche famously declared the "death of God" in The Gay Science (1882), a metaphor for the collapse of traditional values and the rise of the Void as a central concern in modernity. With the death of God, Nietzsche argues, humanity faces a profound Void—an absence of any external source of meaning or value. This leads to what Nietzsche calls "nihilism", where the previous foundations of meaning are exposed as baseless, leaving individuals in a state of existential crisis.

However, Nietzsche does not view the Void purely negatively. Instead, he sees it as an opportunity for the Übermensch (lit. 'Overman') to create new values and meanings. In this way, the Void becomes a space of potential, where the destruction of old beliefs clears the way for the creation of new ones. Nietzsche's vision of the Void is thus both a challenge and an invitation to re-evaluate and re-create meaning in a world devoid of inherent purpose.

=== Existentialism ===
In existentialist thought, the Void often symbolizes the absurd in the universe and the individual's confrontation with this emptiness. Philosophers such as Albert Camus and Jean-Paul Sartre explore the Void as a fundamental aspect of the human condition, where individuals must create their own meaning in a world that offers none.

==== Albert Camus ====
Camus, in The Myth of Sisyphus (1942), elaborates on this existential dilemma by discussing the concept of the absurd—the conflict between humans' desire to find meaning and the universe's indifferent silence. For Camus, the Void is the backdrop against which the absurd plays out, as individuals grapple with the realization that life is inherently meaningless. However, rather than succumbing to despair, Camus advocates for a defiant embrace of the absurd, where one finds freedom and meaning through personal choice and action, even in the face of the Void.

==== Jean-Paul Sartre ====
Sartre, in his seminal work Being and Nothingness (1943), describes human existence as being "condemned to be free", where the Void represents the nothingness at the core of existence that individuals must confront when they realize that life has no preordained purpose. Jean-Paul Sartre's exploration of the Void is central to his existentialist philosophy. Sartre argues that consciousness itself is a form of nothingness, or néant, that introduces a fundamental gap between the self and the world. This gap creates a sense of the Void, as consciousness is constantly aware of what it is not—what it lacks or desires. Sartre describes this as a perpetual state of "lack" or "nothingness", where human beings are always confronted with their own freedom to choose, yet burdened by the responsibility that this freedom entails.

For Sartre, the Void is not just an abstract concept but an experiential reality. It manifests in moments of existential anxiety, where individuals confront the absence of any inherent meaning or purpose in life. This confrontation with the Void reveals the radical freedom that defines human existence: we are not bound by any predetermined essence or external authority, but are free to define ourselves through our choices. However, this freedom is accompanied by a sense of vertigo or anguish, as it exposes the individual to the vast, empty space of potential that they must navigate without any guarantees.

Sartre's famous statement that "existence precedes essence" encapsulates this idea. It implies that there is no pre-existing blueprint for what it means to be human; instead, individuals must create their own essence through their actions. This creation, however, occurs against the backdrop of the Void—an absence of inherent meaning that forces individuals to take full responsibility for their choices and the meanings they create.

Moreover, Sartre discusses the Void in the context of interpersonal relationships, particularly in his analysis of "the look" (le regard). When one person gazes at another, it objectifies the other, reducing them to an object within the world. This objectification creates a sense of the Void, as it strips away the subject's freedom and exposes the emptiness at the core of their being. Sartre uses this concept to illustrate how the Void operates not only on an individual level but also in social interactions, where the awareness of others' perceptions can lead to feelings of alienation and nothingness.

== In science and cosmology ==
The scientific understanding of the Void has evolved dramatically, particularly from the 17th century onward. Evangelista Torricelli's vacuum experiments in the 1640s demonstrated the possibility of an empty space devoid of matter, challenging the longstanding Aristotelian belief that nature abhors a vacuum (horror vacui). These experiments laid the groundwork for a new understanding of the Void as a physical reality rather than a mere conceptual possibility.

The concept of the Void underwent further transformation with the rejection of the aether theories in the late 19th and early 20th centuries. Aether was once believed to be a subtle, invisible medium that filled all of space and carried light waves. However, the Michelson-Morley experiment in 1887 failed to detect any evidence of aether, leading to the theory's eventual abandonment. This shift was further reinforced by Albert Einstein's theory of relativity, which revolutionized the understanding of space itself. According to relativity, space is not a passive backdrop but a dynamic field influenced by mass and energy, fundamentally altering the traditional notion of the Void.

In the context of quantum mechanics, the Void is no longer seen as a simple vacuum but as a quantum vacuum—a field filled with fluctuating energy. As Lawrence Krauss describes it in A Universe from Nothing (2012), even "empty" space is not truly empty but contains a seething field of virtual particles that continuously pop in and out of existence. This quantum vacuum is a foundational aspect of modern physics, underlying the particles and forces that constitute the universe.

== In art and media ==
The concept of the Void is often used to explore themes of emptiness, the unknown, and the boundaries of human experience, and as a metaphor for existential questions, psychological states, and the nature of reality itself.

=== Literature ===
In literature, the Void often serves as a metaphor for existential despair, the search for meaning, or the confrontation with the unknown. Samuel Beckett's Waiting for Godot (1953) is a quintessential example, where the Void is both literal and metaphorical. The play's setting is a barren, empty landscape, and the characters are caught in an endless wait for something that never arrives. The Void here represents the absence of meaning, purpose, and resolution, reflecting the existentialist idea that life is fundamentally devoid of intrinsic meaning.

Franz Kafka's works also engage deeply with the concept of the Void. In The Trial (1925), the protagonist, Josef K., finds himself entangled in a nightmarish legal system where the rules are arbitrary and the authority figures remain unseen. The Void in Kafka's work often symbolizes the oppressive and incomprehensible nature of modern life, where individuals struggle against forces that they cannot understand or control.

In more contemporary literature, the Void is explored in works like Don DeLillo's White Noise (1985), where the pervasive sense of emptiness and alienation in modern society is a central theme. The characters in White Noise are constantly bombarded by the noise of consumer culture and media, creating a metaphorical Void that reflects the absence of authentic human connection and meaning in their lives.

=== Art ===
In the visual arts, the Void is frequently represented as an absence, a space that invites contemplation or evokes a sense of the infinite. One of the most notable artists who explored the Void is Yves Klein, a French artist known for his monochrome works and his exploration of immateriality. Klein's Le Vide (The Void) exhibition in 1958 featured an empty gallery space, painted white, intended to focus the viewer's attention on the emptiness and the absence of material objects. This work challenges traditional notions of art by making the Void itself the subject of the experience.

Alberto Giacometti frequently engaged with the concept of the Void in his sculptures. His elongated figures, such as Walking Man (1960), evoke a sense of isolation and alienation, with the surrounding space emphasizing the emptiness and solitude of the figures. Giacometti's work reflects existential themes, where the Void becomes a metaphor for the human condition and the pervasive sense of nothingness that can accompany it.

Japanese artist Yayoi Kusama explores the Void through her immersive installations, such as the Infinity Mirror Rooms. These rooms use mirrors and lights to create an illusion of infinite space, allowing viewers to experience the disorienting and transcendent qualities of the Void. Kusama's work often reflects her own struggles with mental illness, using the Void as both a personal and universal symbol of the unknown and the infinite.

==== Film ====
The Void is a recurring motif in cinema, often used to symbolize existential dread, the unknown, or the metaphysical boundaries between life and death. Stanley Kubrick's 2001: A Space Odyssey (1968) is one of the most iconic examples, where the vast emptiness of space represents both the awe-inspiring and terrifying aspects of the Void. The film's minimal dialogue and expansive visual sequences emphasize the isolation and mystery of space, which serves as a metaphor for the human condition and the search for meaning in an indifferent universe.

''Enter the Void'' is a 2009 surrealist psychedelic film directed by Gaspar Noé and draws inspiration from the Tibetan Book of the Dead.

Another film that delves into the concept of the Void is The Void (2016), a Canadian horror film directed by Steven Kostanski and Jeremy Gillespie. The film blends Lovecraftian horror with surreal imagery, depicting a hospital that becomes a gateway to a nightmarish otherworld. The Void in this film is not just a physical space but also a symbolic representation of terror and the unknown, drawing on cosmic horror traditions to explore the fear of the incomprehensible.

== Scholarly perspectives and criticism ==
In analytical philosophy, the Void has often been a subject of scrutiny, particularly regarding the treatment of "nothingness" as a substantive concept. Bertrand Russell, a prominent figure in analytical philosophy, expressed skepticism about metaphysical discussions that involve the Void, arguing that such concepts often arise from linguistic and conceptual confusions. Russell posited that the idea of the Void or nothingness can be misleading, as it seems to ascribe existence to a non-existent entity, thereby generating paradoxes rather than resolving philosophical problems.

This critique of the Void extends into contemporary discussions, particularly in the context of scientific theories. Lawrence Krauss's book A Universe from Nothing presents a scientific perspective on the Void, arguing that the quantum vacuum—an apparently empty space filled with fluctuating energy and virtual particles—requires a rethinking of what "nothing" truly means. While Krauss's approach attempts to bridge the gap between physics and metaphysics, it has drawn criticism from philosophers like David Albert, who argue that Krauss conflates scientific and philosophical concepts, leading to oversimplified conclusions about the nature of existence and the origins of the universe.

In his book, The Void (2007), particle physicist Frank Close discusses the concept of 'empty space' and its history from Aristotle through Newton, Mach, Einstein and beyond (including the idea of an 'aether' and current examinations of the Higgs field).

== See also ==
- Emptiness
- Chaos – Void state preceding creation
- Ginnungagap – Primordial void mentioned in the Gylfaginning
- Kenoma – Concept in Gnosticism
- Ma – Japanese artistic concept
- Nuit – Deity in Thelema
- Zhi – Primordial state in Tibetan Buddhism
- Aether (classical element) – Classical element
