= Corpuscularianism =

Physical theory that supposes all matter to be composed of minute particles

Corpuscularianism, also known as corpuscularism (from Latin corpusculum 'little body' and -ism), is a set of theories that explain natural transformations as a result of the interaction of particles (minima naturalia, partes exiles, partes parvae, particulae, and semina). It differs from atomism in that corpuscles are usually endowed with a property of their own and are further divisible, while atoms are neither. Although often associated with the emergence of early modern mechanical philosophy, and especially with the names of Thomas Hobbes, René Descartes, Pierre Gassendi, Robert Boyle, Isaac Newton, and John Locke, corpuscularian theories can be found throughout the history of Western philosophy.

== Matter corpuscles ==
Corpuscularianism is similar to the theory of atomism, except that where atoms were supposed to be indivisible, corpuscles could in principle be divided. In this manner, for example, it was theorized that mercury could penetrate into metals and modify their inner structure, a step on the way towards the production of gold by transmutation.

Corpuscularianism was associated by its leading proponents with the idea that some of the apparent properties of objects are artifacts of the perceiving mind, that is, "secondary" qualities as distinguished from "primary" qualities. Corpuscles were thought to be unobservable and having a very limited number of basic properties, such as size, shape, and motion.

William R. Newman traces the origins from the fourth book of Aristotle, Meteorology. The "dry" and "moist" exhalations of Aristotle became the alchemical 'sulfur' and 'mercury' of the eighth-century Islamic alchemist, Jābir ibn Hayyān (died c. 806–816). Pseudo-Geber's Summa perfectionis contains an alchemical theory in which unified sulfur and mercury corpuscles, differing in purity, size, and relative proportions, form the basis of a much more complicated process.

Corpuscularianism remained a dominant theory for centuries and was blended with alchemy by early scientists such as Robert Boyle and Isaac Newton in the 17th century. In his work The Sceptical Chymist (1661), Boyle abandoned the Aristotelian ideas of the classical elements—earth, water, air, and fire—in favor of corpuscularianism. In his later work, The Origin of Forms and Qualities (1666), Boyle used corpuscularianism to explain all of the major Aristotelian concepts, marking a departure from traditional Aristotelianism. Boyle used it to develop his mechanical corpuscular philosophy, which laid the foundations for the chemical revolution.

== Light corpuscules ==
Isaac Newton’s corpuscular theory of light proposed that light consists of tiny particles, or corpuscles, traveling in straight lines. In contrast, Christiaan Huygens proposed that light was wave. Until the 18th century, the corpuscular theory successfully explained reflection and refraction but struggled with diffraction. By the early 19th century, experiments by Thomas Young and Augustin-Jean Fresnel conclusively demonstrated the wave nature of light. However, the concept of light as particles resurfaced in the 20th century with the concept of photons, leading to the modern wave-particle duality of light.

== Gravitational corpuscles ==
In antiquity, the idea of gravitational corpuscles was invoked to explain the influence of the Moon over the tides.

When Newton introduced his law of universal gravitation, he considered that it was problematic as it behave as action at a distance. Alternative theories to Newtonian gravity also expanded the use of corpuscles, Le Sage's theory of gravitation of 1748, considered that corpuscles exerted pressure over objects. Also aether theories were suggested to explain gravitation until the development of general relativity in 1915.

== Magnetic effluences ==
Ancient philosopher Empedocles introduced the idea of effluences to explain magnetic forces as seen in lodestones. René Descartes further developed this theory.

== Sociology ==
The philosopher Thomas Hobbes used corpuscularianism to justify his political theories in Leviathan.

== Particle Model of Matter ==
The Particle Model of Matter (also known as the Particle Theory or the Kinetic Molecular Theory) is a set of 4 or 5 scientific principles how particles behave to create the physical properties we view in solids, liquids, and gases.

The 4 (or 5) principles are:

1. All matter is made of tiny particles
2. There is space between all particles
3. The higher the temperature, the more energy the particles have
4. All particles are attracted to one another
5. All particles in a pure substance are the same (Sometimes listed as a principle, sometimes not)

== See also ==
- Atomic theory
- Atomism
- Classical element
- History of chemistry
- Imponderable fluids

== Bibliography ==
- Bigotti, Fabrizio (2017). "A Previously Unknown Path to Corpuscularism in the Seventeenth Century: Santorio's Marginalia to the Commentaria in Primam Fen Primi Libri Canonis Avicennae (1625)". Ambix. 64 (1): 29–42. doi:10.1080/00026980.2017.1287550. PMC 5470109. PMID 28350287.
- Clericuzio, Antonio (2000). Elements, Principles and Corpuscles: A Study of Atomism and Chemistry in the Seventeenth Century. Dordrecht: Kluwer. ISBN 978-0-7923-6782-6.
- Lasswitz, Kurd (1890). Geschichte der Atomistik vom Mittelalter bis Newton. Band 1: Die Erneuerung der Korpuskulartheorie. Band 2: Höhepunkt und Verfall der Korpuskulartheorie des siebzehnten Jahrhunderts. Hamburg-Leipzig: Voss. OCLC 2361346.
- Lüthy, Christoph; Murdoch, John E.; Newman, William R., eds. (2001). Late Medieval and Early Modern Corpuscular Matter Theories. Leiden: Brill. ISBN 978-90-04-11516-3.
- Newman, William R. (1993). "The Corpuscular Theory of J.B. Van Helmont and its Medieval Sources". Vivarium. 31 (1): 161–191. doi:10.1163/156853493X00132.
- Newman, William R. (1994). "Robert Boyle's Debt to Corpuscular Alchemy". In Hunter, Michael (ed.). Robert Boyle Reconsidered. Cambridge: Cambridge University Press. pp. 107–118.
- Newman, William R. (1996). "The Alchemical Sources of Robert Boyle's Corpuscular Philosophy". Annals of Science. 53 (6): 567–585. doi:10.1080/00033799600200401.
- Newman, William R. (2001). "Corpuscular Alchemy and the Tradition of Aristotle's Meteorology, with Special Reference to Daniel Sennert". International Studies in the Philosophy of Science. 15 (2): 145–153. doi:10.1080/02698590120059013.
- Newman, William R. (2006). Atoms and Alchemy: Chymistry and the Experimental Origins of the Scientific Revolution. Chicago: University of Chicago Press. ISBN 978-0-226-57697-8.
- Newman, William R. (2014). "Mercury and Sulphur among the High Medieval Alchemists: From Razi and Avicenna to Albertus Magnus and Pseudo-Roger Bacon". Ambix. 62 (4): 327–344. doi:10.1179/1745823414Y.0000000004. PMID 25509633.
- Norris, John A. (2006). "The Mineral Exhalation Theory of Metallogenesis in Pre-Modern Mineral Science". Ambix. 53: 43–65. doi:10.1179/174582306X93183.
- Pabst, Bernhard (1994). Atomtheorien des lateinischen Mittelalters. Darmstadt: Wissenschaftliche Buchgesellschaft.
