= Brute fact =

Fact which cannot be explained

In contemporary philosophy, a brute fact is a fact that cannot be explained in terms of a deeper, more "fundamental" fact. There are two main ways to explain something: say what "brought it about", or describe it at a more "fundamental" level. For example, a cat displayed on a computer screen can be explained, more "fundamentally", in terms of certain voltages in bits of metal in the screen, which in turn can be explained, more "fundamentally", in terms of certain subatomic particles moving in a certain manner. If one were to keep explaining the world in this way and reach a point at which no more "deeper" explanations can be given, then one would have found some facts which are brute or inexplicable, in the sense that we cannot give them an ontological explanation. As it might be put, there may exist some things that just are.

To reject the existence of brute facts is to think that everything can be explained ("Everything can be explained" is sometimes called the principle of sufficient reason).

== Brute/scientific fact ==
Henri Poincaré distinguished between brute facts and their scientific descriptions, pointing to how the conventional nature of the latter always remained constrained by the brute fact in question.

Pierre Duhem argued that just as there may be several scientific descriptions of the same brute fact, so too there may be many brute facts with the same scientific description.

== Anscombe ==
G. E. M. Anscombe wrote about how facts can be brute relative to other facts. Simply put, some facts cannot be reducible to other facts, such that if some set of facts holds true, it does not entail the fact brute relative to it. The example she uses is that of someone owing a grocer money for supplying them with potatoes. In such a case, the set of facts, e.g. that the customer asked for the potatoes, that the grocer supplied them with the potatoes, etc., does not necessarily entail that the customer owes the grocer money. After all, this could all have transpired on the set of a film as a bit of acting, in which case the customer would not actually owe anything.

One might object that if the institutional context is taken into account, putatively brute facts can be reduced to constituent facts. That is, in the context of something like the institution of a market, a customer ordering potatoes, etc. would entail that they owe the grocer compensation equal to the service that was provided. While Anscombe does acknowledge that an institutional context is necessary for a particular description to make sense, it does not necessarily follow that a particular set of facts holding true in an institutional context entails the fact brute relative to it. To wit, if the example is indeed considered in the institutional context necessary for descriptions of 'owing', it could still be the case that the customer does not owe the grocer, per the counterexample of a film production. This fundamental ambiguity is essentially what makes a fact brute relative to other facts.

Nonetheless, Anscombe does argue that under normal circumstances, such a fact is actually entailed. That is, if it is true that a customer requested potatoes, etc., then under normal circumstances the customer would indeed owe the grocer money. However, because such entailment is conditional on such a set of facts holding true under a particular set of circumstances, the fact entailed is still fundamentally brute relative to such facts, just that in such a case the leap in inference occurs at the level of the circumstances, not that of the facts themselves.

Finally, if a fact brute relative to other facts holds true, it follows that some set of facts it is brute relative to is also true, e.g. if the customer owes the grocer money, then it follows that the grocer supplied them with potatoes. After all, had they not done so, then the customer would not owe them money. As such, given some fact brute relative to other facts, there is a range of facts, such that a set of them will hold if the fact brute relative to them also holds. That being said, Anscombe argues that the full range of facts that some fact can be brute relative to cannot be known exhaustively. The rough range can be sketched out with relevant, paradigmatic examples, but the full range of such facts cannot be known, as one can theoretically always suppose a new special context that changes the range.

== Searle ==
John Searle developed Anscombe's concept of brute facts into what he called brute physical facts—such as that snow is on Mt. Everest—as opposed to social or institutional facts, dependent for their existence on human agreement. Thus, he considered money to be an institutional fact, which nevertheless rested ultimately on a brute physical fact, whether a piece of paper or only an electronic record.

Searle thought that the pervasiveness of social facts could disguise their social construction and ultimate reliance upon the brute fact: thus, we are for example trained from infancy (in his words) to see "cellulose fibres with green and gray stains, or enamel-covered iron concavities containing water...[as] dollar bills, and full bathtubs".

== Vintiadis ==
In 2018 Elly Vintiadis edited a collection of papers on brute facts that is the first systematic exploration of bruteness and which includes original papers by a number of philosophers and scientists. The collection focuses on physical, emergent and modal brute facts rather than social facts. Vintiadis argues that a properly understood naturalistic attitude requires that we accept the existence of ontological brute facts and also, possibly, emergent brute facts.

Beyond the initial definition given above of brute facts as facts that do not have explanations, there is a distinction drawn by Eric Barnes (1994) between epistemically brute facts and ontologically brute facts. The former are for which we do not have an explanation, they are brute for us (e.g., Vintiadis cites the fact that gases behave in a manner described by the Boyle-Charles law was an epistemologically brute fact until its explanation in terms of the kinetic theory of gases). The latter, ontologically brute facts are facts for which there is no explanation in virtue of the way the world is (e.g., the fundamental laws of physics). Which facts we accept as ontologically brute though depends on what kind of theory of explanation we accept (e.g. the properties of fundamental particles will be brute facts under a mereological view of explanation, but a fundamental law will be brute under a covering law model of explanation).

== Infinitism ==
According to explanatory infinitism, the chain of explanations goes on infinitely and there is no fundamental explanation. This, then, is another way of objecting to the existence of explanatory brute facts, but also metaphysical brute facts, if bruteness is understood in terms of ontological independence.

On the question of why there is anything at all, some have suggested the possibility of an infinite regress, where, if an entity can't come from nothing and this concept is mutually exclusive from something, there must have always been something that caused the previous effect, with this causal chain (either deterministic or probabilistic) extending infinitely back in time.

== Examples ==
Bertrand Russell took a brute fact position when he said, "I should say that the universe is just there, and that's all." Sean Carroll similarly concluded that "any attempt to account for the existence of something rather than nothing must ultimately bottom out in a set of brute facts; the universe simply is, without ultimate cause or explanation."

== See also ==
- First principle
- Four causes
- Is–ought problem – the distinction between factual claims and value or normative claims
- Münchhausen trilemma
- Question of law
