= Entity =

Something that exists

An entity is something that exists. In its broadest sense, the concept is the most general category of being and encompasses anything that is identifiable, including living beings, inanimate objects, places, events, ideas, numbers, properties, and relations. It is controversial whether empty space and absences, such as holes or shadows, are also entities or should be regarded as nonentities. The words object, thing, and being are often treated as synonyms for entity, but they have distinct connotations and are not always interchangeable.

Various fundamental types of entities have been proposed, but it is disputed whether they are all part of reality. Particulars are individual, nonrepeatable entities, such as a specific apple. They contrast with universals, which are general entities that can express repeatable features of particulars, such as the color red. Concrete entities exist in space and time and causally interact, such as a cat, which is not the case for abstract entities, such as the number 7. Independent entities exist on their own, whereas dependent entities require or are grounded in other entities. Other suggested types include possible, actual, and necessary entities; observable and unobservable entities; and fictional and intentional entities. Entities are typically treated as having an identity, which relates each entity to itself and distinguishes it from all other entities. Questions of identity are closely connected to composition and boundaries: some entities are composed of smaller entities, such as a table made up of a tabletop and legs, while boundaries separate entities from each other, marking where one thing ends, and another begins.

The concept entity is relevant to many fields. Metaphysics and ontology study what an entity is, which entities exist, and how they may be divided into categories of being. Philosophy of language, philosophy of mind, and epistemology discuss how linguistic representations or mental processes refer to entities. Information science and computer science are interested in how information about entities is stored in knowledge bases. More specific uses of the term entity are found in the fields of law, economics, accounting, politics, chemistry, and medicine.

Philosophical discussions of the nature of entities and related concepts originated in antiquity, particularly in ancient Greek and Indian thought. The existence of universal entities was a central topic in medieval philosophy, while later discussions addressed the relation between mental and physical entities, the problem of non-existing entities, and general principles that apply to all entities.

== Definition ==
In the broadest sense, entities encompass anything that is identifiable, including inanimate objects, living organisms, ideas, and numbers.
Philosophers discuss whether absences or negative entities, such as a shadow of a person or a hole in a cheese, are genuine entities or nonentities.

An entity is something that exists, such as a material object or living being. Entities are often regarded as having separate or independent existence, each with its own identity, distinct from other entities. In its broadest sense, the concept encompasses all identifiable items. This can include inanimate everyday objects, people, events, places, ideas, relations, facts, universal entities, abstract objects, and collective entities such as sets. Accordingly, the concept entity is often treated as the broadest category of being, covering everything that is or could be. Some definitions provide narrower characterizations that require additional conditions, for example, that entities are stable, have clear boundaries, are indivisible, or serve as distinct objects that can be counted.

Entities contrast with nonentities, although it is controversial to what this concept applies. Suggested examples of nonentities include voids, emptiness, nothingness, and absences, such as holes or shadows. Similarly, philosophers debate whether nonexistent objects, such as the winged horse Pegasus, should be regarded as entities. Another set of challenges comes from parts or aspects of reality that are not clearly identifiable, for example because they lack exact boundaries or cannot be precisely distinguished from other entities. The terms reification and hypostatization can denote the practice of treating a nonentity as if it were an entity. (Note: These terms are used when abstractions are regarded as material entities.)

The English word entity has its roots in the Latin term ens, meaning 'being'. It gave rise to the Latin word entitas and was subsequently adopted into French as the term entité. The French word was borrowed into English in the 16th century, with the earliest known use in 1596 in a work by Thomas Bell.

=== Related concepts ===
The terms object, thing, and being are commonly used as synonyms of entity. (Note: Other closely related terms include existent, substance, and stuff.) However, they carry distinct connotations and are sometimes used differently.

An object is something toward which thought, perception, or intention is directed. In a broad sense, objects encompass all items apprehended, imagined, or referred to, including not only physical objects but also fictional ones without real counterparts, such as unicorns. In a narrower sense, the term is sometimes limited to material entities that can be perceived by the senses. A common distinction contrasts objects with subjects. It holds that while objects are grasped in consciousness, they do not possess it: an object is an it that can appear in someone's consciousness, whereas a subject is a self that acts as a center of consciousness.

Understood broadly, a thing is any item whose existence is acknowledged, including but not limited to material bodies. In this regard, the word thing is the broadest countable noun. (Note: This is expressed in the saying "everything is a thing".) However, the term is also used in more restricted ways to denote an individual entity in contrast to the properties it has or the relations it bears to other things. In this sense, a car is a thing, whereas its shape, color, and weight are features or aspects rather than things in their own right. (Note: A similar contrast is also sometimes applied to the term object, regarding objects as individual entities that differ from the properties they instantiate.) Another contrast distinguishes things as individual, countable objects from stuff as an undifferentiated material, such as water or iron. In everyday discourse, the term thing is often used for inanimate objects, such as rocks or chairs, contrasting with living creatures, such as humans and other animals.

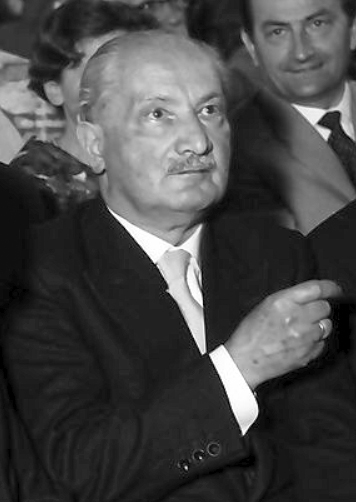
Martin Heidegger proposed the ontological difference, contrasting individual beings or entities with being.

When used as a countable noun, the expression a being overlaps with that of an entity, denoting something that exists. However, being is also used as an uncountable noun, referring to the fact that something is, to existence as such, or to the totality of reality. The distinction between being and beings played a central role in the philosophy of Martin Heidegger, who termed it the ontological difference. He argued that being constitutes the background context that makes all individual beings intelligible, insisting that being is not itself an individual being. Traditionally, being is contrasted with becoming. In this sense, being denotes stable or permanent aspects of reality, whereas becoming covers changes and processes.

== Types ==
Many types of entities are discussed in the academic discourse. Different classifications may overlap, and it is controversial whether all proposed categories represent genuine entities.

=== Particular and universal ===
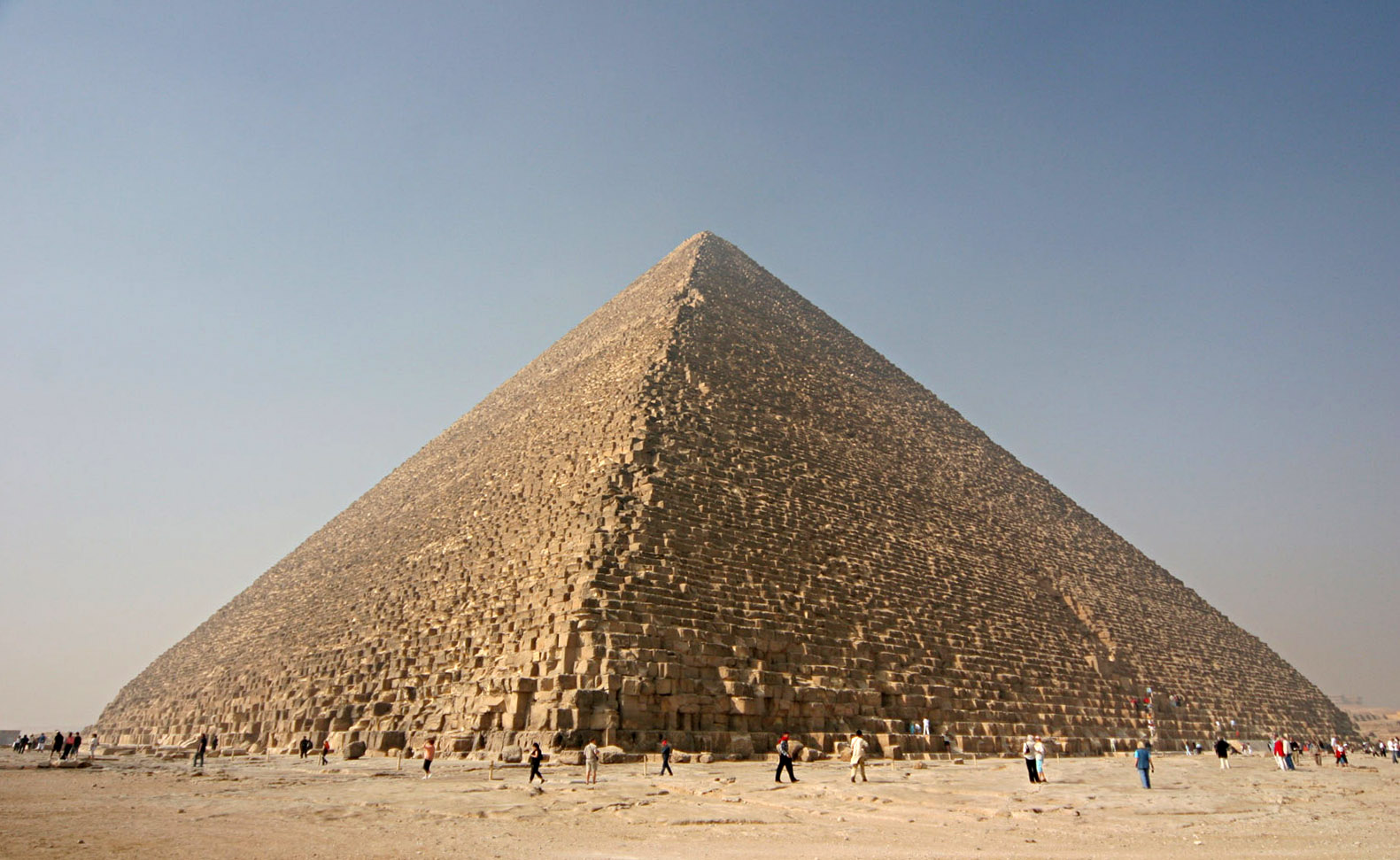
Particulars are individual, nonrepeatable entities, such as the Great Pyramid of Giza, whereas universals are general, repeatable entities, such as the color blue.

Particulars are individual entities: they are unique and non-repeatable. They contrast with universals, which are general and repeatable entities. For example, the philosopher Socrates, the Great Pyramid of Giza, and the planet Mars are particular entities, whereas the color blue, the shape of a square, and the property of being a flower are universal entities. A key difference is that each particular exists as an individual instance, whereas universals can have multiple instances and be present in several locations at the same time. Universals can express repeatable aspects of particulars. For example, the particulars Mars and Jupiter are both characterized by the universal of being a planet. According to a common view, particulars instantiate universals but are not themselves instantiated by anything else.

Universals are frequently understood in terms of properties and relations. A property is an entity that expresses a quality or feature of another entity. For example, the property being-tall is a feature of the Empire State Building. A relation is an entity that expresses how several things stand to each other. For instance, the relation being-taller-than is an entity that characterizes how the Empire State Building stands to the White House. Although properties are typically treated as universal entities that can have multiple instances, an alternative approach treats them as particulars, called tropes, regarding each individual instance as a separate entity.

Various metaphysical debates address the reality of universals, asking whether they exist as genuine entities. Platonic realists assert that universals can exist independently of particulars, while moderate realists hold that they exist only when instantiated by particulars. Conceptualists maintain that universals exist only in the minds of individuals as conceptual entities but not in mind-independent reality, whereas nominalists deny that universals in either form are real.

=== Concrete and abstract ===
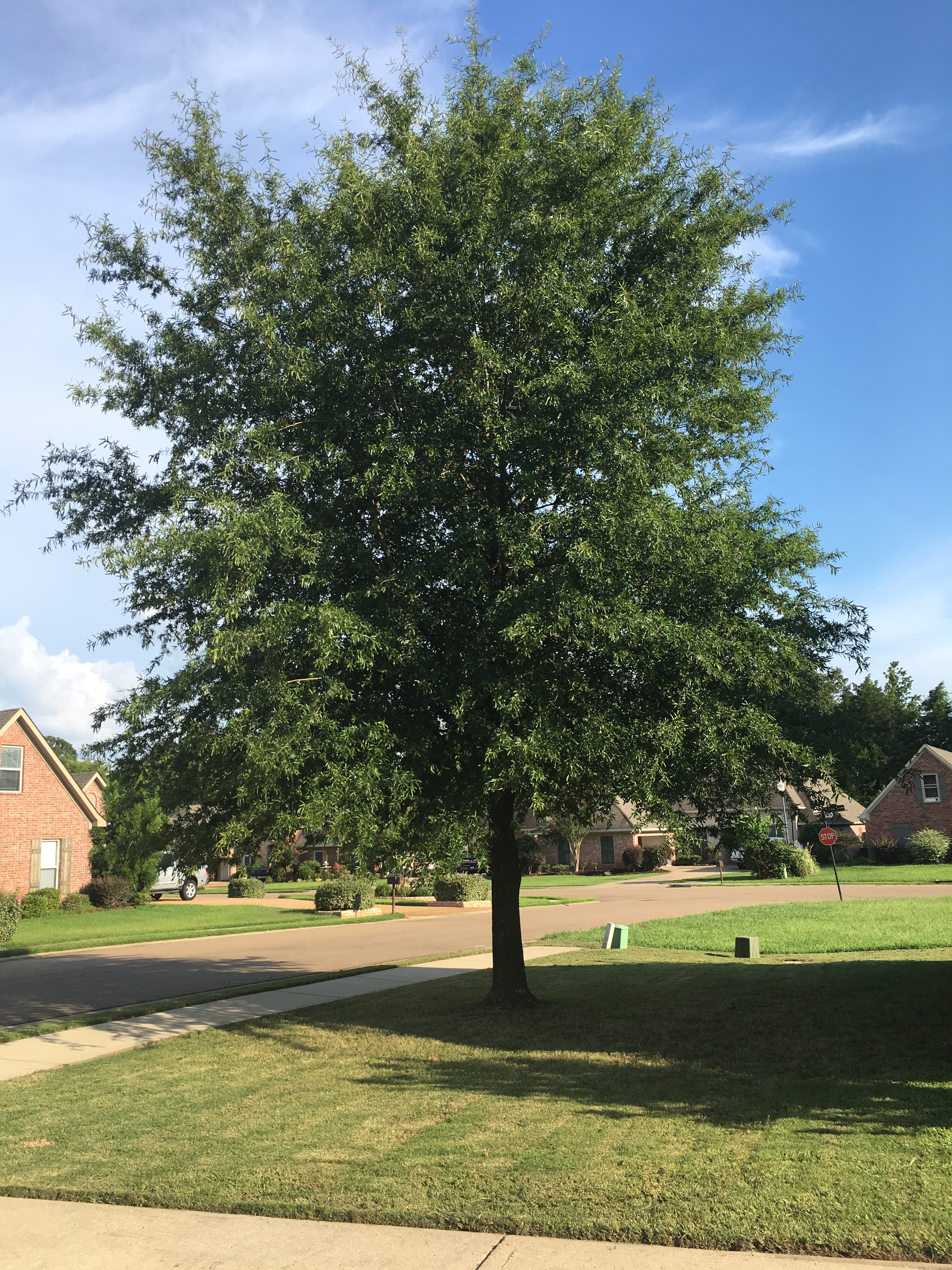
Concrete entities, such as a tree, contrast with abstract entities, such as the empty set.

Concrete entities are things that exist in space and time. They can undergo changes, causally interact with other entities, and be perceived or measured, either directly or indirectly. They contrast with abstract entities, which have no physical location or temporal duration. Accordingly, abstract entities do not undergo changes, do not causally interact with other entities, and are not accessible to sensory perception. (Note: The exact definition of abstract entities is disputed, and alternative characterizations have been suggested, such as the idea that abstract entities are the product of the psychological process of abstraction by mentally removing features from concrete objects.) For example, a tree, a house, and an earthquake are concrete entities, whereas the number 7, the empty set, and the proposition "snow is white" are abstract entities.

Concrete entities can be distinguished by the field of inquiry that studies them, including physical, biological, psychological, and social entities, such as a rock, a bird, an idea, and a financial institution, respectively. According to one view, the different domains belong to distinct levels of reality. This outlook suggests that higher-level entities emerge from lower-level entities, depend on them, and show new forms of organization, as in the claim that mental states emerge from physical brains.

While the existence of concrete entities is widely accepted, it is controversial whether abstract entities are genuine constituents of reality. Proponents argue that abstract entities are indispensable to scientific descriptions of the world and that many domains of discourse refer to them as if they were distinct entities. Opponents question in what sense entities outside spacetime and without causal relationships could exist, and how humans, who are themselves concrete entities, could know about them.

=== Independent and dependent ===
Independent entities exist on their own without relying on other entities. They contrast with dependent entities, which require other entities or are grounded in them. Philosophical discussions concern whether there are dependent entities in addition to independent ones, and which entities fall under each category. For example, one view identifies independent entities with substances, conceived as particulars that underlie and support properties and relations. On this view, substantial entities such as a tomato are independent, whereas their features are dependent, such as the idea that the redness of a tomato depends on the tomato because it inheres in the tomato. A different suggestion holds that macroscopic objects encountered in everyday life, such as chairs, are dependent on the microscopic objects, such as the elementary particles that constitute them.

The contrast between independent and dependent entities overlaps with that between major and minor entities. Major entities are regarded as having a more substantial or robust existence, such as material objects and events. They contrast with minor entities, which are considered subordinate in some sense, such as surfaces, holes, and shadows. For example, the surface of an apple has one spatial dimension less than the apple and cannot exist without the apple, making it less substantial. Similarly, a hole in a cheese or a shadow cast by a person is regarded as less robust since it involves an absence of matter or light rather than a positive physical presence. Absences are also called negative entities, and it is debated whether they should be regarded as genuine but dependent entities. (Note: A similar problem concerns the ontological status of omissions as negative events that did not occur, such as an action that someone failed to perform.)

=== Possible, actual, and necessary ===
Possible entities, or possibilia, are things that could exist. For example, Santa Claus, understood as a jolly, white-bearded inhabitant of the North Pole, is a possible entity. Actual entities are entities that actually exist, such as King Charles III. In the broadest sense, every actual entity is also a possible entity since actual existence implies possible existence. However, the term possible entity is often used more narrowly to refer to merely possible entities, which lack actual existence. Necessary entities are actual entities that not only exist but could not have failed to exist, making their existence inevitable. It is controversial whether there are any necessary entities and, if so, which entities qualify as necessary. Suggested examples include abstract entities and God. Actual entities that are not necessary are called contingent entities: they exist but could have failed to exist.

The distinction between possible, actual, and necessary entities is often discussed in terms of possible worlds—ways how things could have been. According to this view, an entity is possible if it exists in at least one possible world, actual if it exists in the actual world, and necessary if it exists in all possible worlds.

Various metaphysical theories address the reality of possible entities. Actualism is the view that only actual entities are genuine objects. According to this view, there are no non-actual possible entities, for example, because statements about possible entities are analyzed as claims about actual things, such as actual fictions or ideas. Possibilism, by contrast, regards non-actual possible entities as genuine entities, as real as actual ones. Some discussions also address the reality or non-reality of impossible entities, which are proposed entities that could not exist because they have contradictory features, such as a round square.

=== Other types ===
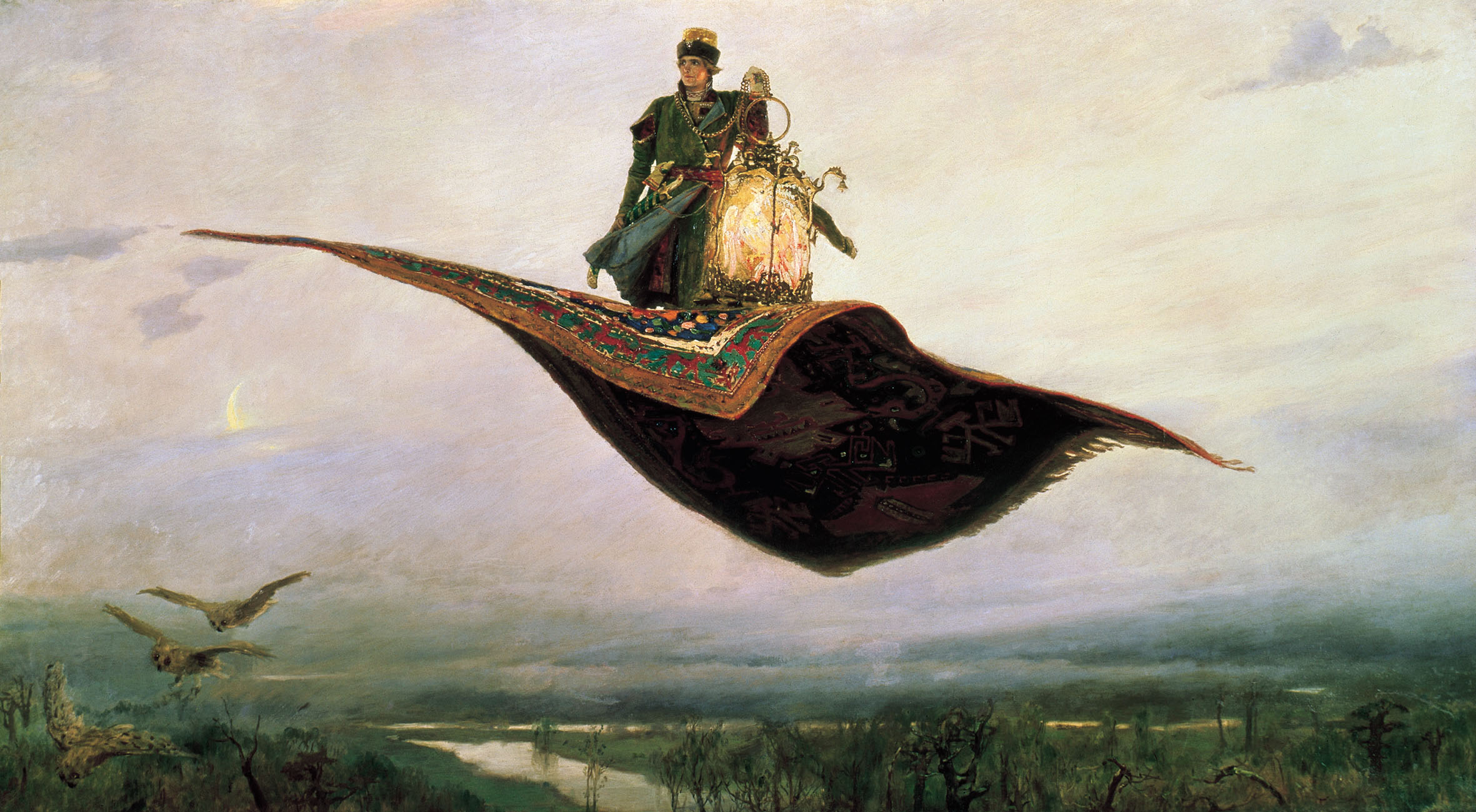
Fictional entities are things that are represented in works of fiction, such as a flying carpet.

The contrast between observable and unobservable entities pertains to the empirical sciences. Observable entities are things that humans can directly perceive under the right circumstances, such as cats and traffic lights. They contrast with unobservable or theoretical entities, such as electrons and wave functions, which cannot be directly perceived. Scientists often posit unobservable entities in their theories to explain why observable phenomena occur or how they behave. It is controversial whether unobservable entities should be regarded as genuine constituents of reality. Scientific realism holds that the best scientific theories provide an accurate description of reality and are either exactly or at least approximately true. Entity realism, a specific form of scientific realism, holds that only certain unobservable entities are real: those with which scientists can causally interact to produce effects through experimental manipulation. Instrumentalism is a different view that opposes scientific realism. It holds that scientific theories are tools for making predictions about observable reality without commitments to the existence of unobservable entities.

Fictional entities are things that are represented in works of fiction. For example, the hobbit Frodo is a fictional character in J. R. R. Tolkien's The Lord of the Rings; a flying carpet is a fictional object in the folktales One Thousand and One Nights; and Tatooine is a fictional place in the Star Wars saga. Fictional entities are closely related to intentional objects—entities towards which mental states, such as thoughts or perceptions, are directed. For instance, when a person thinks about Bigfoot then Bigfoot is the intentional object of the thought. Similarly, conceptual entities are mental constructions apprehended by reason and manipulated in cognitive processes, such as the mental representation of a total additional velocity introduced by a physicist to analyze how the motion of a body changes. (Note: A connected topic is intensional entities, such as concepts and propositions. Intensional entities violate the principle of extensionality: two intensional entities can differ even if they apply to the same things or have the same truth conditions. For example, the concept well-formed creature with a kidney differs from the concept well-formed creature with a heart, although both concepts apply to the same entities. Intensional entities contrast with extensional entities, such as mathematical sets, which obey extensionality.)

Facts are entities that express what is the case, often understood as correlates of true statements. They are typically analyzed as complex entities with an internal structure reflecting the objects, properties, and relations they involve. According to this view, the fact "the Moon is round" is made up of the object the Moon and the property roundness. Events are entities that occur in time, such as the first Moon landing.

== Principles and theories ==
=== Identity and quantification ===
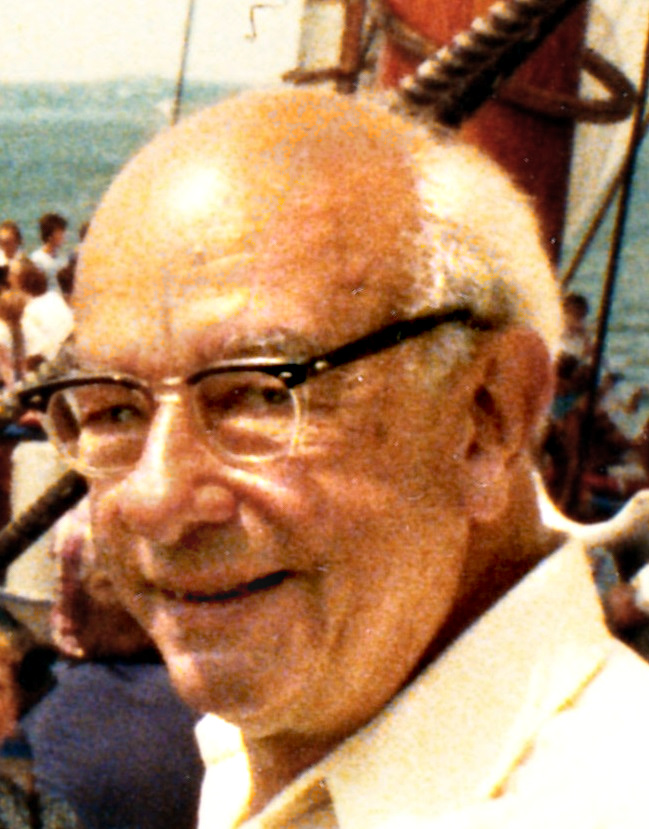
Willard Van Orman Quine proposed the principle "no entity without identity", suggesting that something is not an entity if there are no criteria for its identity to or difference from something else.

Identity expresses that two things are the same, either numerically or qualitatively. Numerical identity is a relation that every entity has only to itself and to no distinct entity. (Note: This is articulated in the law of identity, which asserts that every entity is identical to itself, stated formally as $a = a$.) For example, the morning star is numerically identical to the evening star since both terms refer to the same object: the planet Venus. Qualitative identity, or indiscernibility, is a relation between entities that have the same features and resemble each other in every respect, such as perfect identical twins. (Note: In a weaker sense, qualitative identity can also mean that only some features are shared. For example, a poodle and a bulldog are qualitatively identical to some extent because both have the property of being a dog.) The indiscernibility of identicals is a widely accepted principle stating that numerical identity implies the absence of qualitative differences. The converse principle, the identity of indiscernibles, is more controversial: it suggests that if entities have no qualitative differences, then they are numerically identical, implying that two distinct entities cannot have exactly the same properties.

Numerical identity is typically regarded as a central aspect of entities, reflected in the principle "no entity without identity". This proposed principle expresses the idea that something should not be treated as a genuine entity if there is in principle no way to determine whether it is identical to or distinct from something else. The way of determining this is called criterion of identity or principle of individuation. The ability to determine identity and difference is central for acquiring objective knowledge about the world, for example, when comparing observations made at different times, assessing whether statements by different people concern the same thing, and combining information from reports that describe the same object in different ways. Different types of entities can have different criteria of identity. For example, mathematical sets are identical if they have the same members, whereas one account of the identity conditions of events holds that events are identical if they have the same causes and effects. For various types of entities, it is controversial what their criteria of identity are, or whether they have determinate criteria of identity at all.

The problem of identity conditions includes diachronic identity, which is about the same entity at different times: it concerns the question of how, or under what conditions, entities persist through time while remaining the same. For example, the Ship of Theseus is a thought experiment about a ship whose parts are gradually replaced until no original component remains, raising the question of whether it is still the same ship. Diachronic identity contrasts with synchronic identity, which relates an entity to itself at the same time.

Identity plays a key role in quantification, which concerns how entities are counted to determine how many there are. Some quantifiers provide only general assessments, such as some and all, which indicate whether something exists at least once or applies to all entities within a domain. Others express more specific conditions, such as between four and seven or exactly eleven. Identity is often regarded as a requirement for quantification, reflecting the idea that entities can only be counted if it is possible to distinguish one individual from another. However, there may be cases where the two can come apart: one suggested case involves quantum systems, such as a helium atom with two electrons, where it may be impossible to distinguish one electron from the other, although one can determine that exactly two electrons are present.

=== Composition and constitution ===
Composition is a relation between a whole and its parts. Many entities encountered in everyday life are complex objects composed of several parts. For example, a table is made up of a tabletop and legs. Parts may themselves be composed of smaller parts, such as the molecules that comprise the tabletop.

Mereology is the field studying composition. It examines the theories and underlying principles of the part-whole relation, including the conditions under which a collection of parts may be considered a whole. According to mereological universalism, there are no limiting conditions: any collection of entities comprises a whole, such as a whole consisting of a rusty bicycle, a beaver, and a moon of Jupiter. This view is rejected by mereological moderatism, which holds that there are some limitations. For example, one suggested condition is that the parts of a whole need to be in physical contact with each other. Mereological nihilism denies that wholes exist as genuine entities. According to this view, there are no composite entities with proper parts. A related discussion addresses the existence of simple or indivisible material entities, which have no proper parts. Atomism asserts that such entities exist, whereas continuum theorists hold that everything is infinitely divisible, meaning that every entity, no matter how small, is itself composed of smaller parts.

Composition is closely related to material constitution, the relation between a material object and the matter of which it is composed. For example, if a lump of clay is formed into a statue then the lump constitutes the statue. According to one view, material constitution is the same as identity, meaning that the lump and the statue are the same entity. One difficulty for this view is that the lump existed before the statue and can survive the statue's destruction, suggesting that they are not identical because they have different properties. (Note: A different approach to composition is hylomorphism, which holds that each material entity is composed of two principles: matter and form.)

=== Boundaries ===
The boundary of an entity separates it from its environment. Boundaries mark where one thing ends and another begins: all parts of an entity lie within its boundaries, and none lie beyond them. Boundaries typically apply to concrete entities, such as the surface of a cherry acting as the fruit's spatial boundary and a person's birth and death dates acting as the temporal boundaries of their life. In the broadest sense, the concept has also been applied to abstract entities, such as the boundary of a set of points in geometry.

Philosophers debate whether boundaries are genuine entities, often construed as lower-dimensional objects. This view is opposed by eliminativism, which regards boundaries as mere abstractions or aspects of bounded entities rather than entities in their own right. A further philosophical challenge comes from vague boundaries, for which no sharp demarcation separating the inside of an entity from its outside can be identified, such as clouds, mountains, and historical events like the Industrial Revolution. According to one view, this difficulty is not limited to certain objects but concerns reality in general. This perspective holds that reality is a single integrated and continuous whole. It maintains that commonly accepted entities lack genuine existence since they result from arbitrarily imposed boundaries grounded in human cognition rather than in mind-independent divisions inherent in the structure of reality itself.

=== Realism and anti-realism ===
Realists and anti-realists debate the existence of mind-independent entities. In the broadest sense, realism holds that there is an external world and that the entities within it exist the way they do, regardless of how people perceive or think about them. Anti-realism, by contrast, maintains that reality depends on human consciousness or mental processes, for example, because it is shaped by conceptual schemes, linguistic practices, or the inborn cognitive structure of the mind.

Discussions between realists and anti-realists often focus on specific types of entities rather than on reality in general. For example, realism about universals holds that universals are genuine entities in their own right rather than mere conceptual constructions. Similar debates address the existence of abstract objects, moral facts, values, and unobservable entities.

=== Others ===
Discussions about the existence of entities often invoke the concept ontological commitment. An ontological commitment of a theory is an entity that exists according to that theory. For example, theism affirms God's existence, resulting in an ontological commitment to God. An influential but controversial way of analyzing ontological commitments was suggested by Willard Van Orman Quine. He proposed that by translating a theory into first-order logic, its ontological commitments are revealed by quantified statements that cannot be true unless the entities they describe exist.

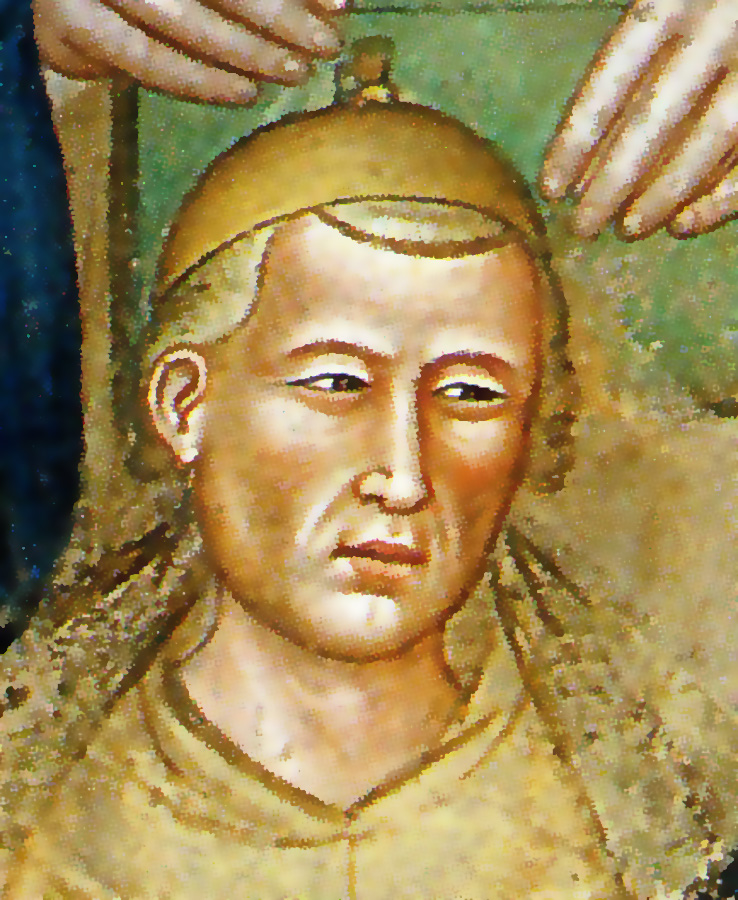
William of Ockham suggested that theories should posit no more entities than necessary for explanation, a principle known as Ockham's razor.

Ockham's razor is a methodological principle for constructing theories or choosing between alternative explanations by assessing their ontological commitments. It holds that theories with the fewest ontological commitments, positing the smallest number of entities, are preferable. It follows the idea that "entities should not be multiplied beyond necessity", resulting in a preference for simple theories that require few assumptions.

The discussion between existence pluralism, existence monism, and existence nihilism concerns the number of concrete entities that exist. Existence pluralism is the widely accepted view that reality is made up of multiple concrete entities. It aligns with the common-sense view of reality that the things people encounter in everyday life, such as cars and plants, are distinct entities. Existence monism challenges this perspective by contending that there is only a single concrete entity: the world as a whole. According to this outlook, the different items encountered in everyday life are not genuine entities but merely aspects or features of the single world object. Existence nihilism, another controversial view, argues that there are no concrete entities, neither everyday objects nor the world as a whole. One version holds that there is only undifferentiated stuff, while another argues that reality is composed of a multiplicity of features. On these accounts, neither stuff nor a multiplicity of features qualify as genuine entities.

The principle of sufficient reason is the view that nothing is without a reason. It holds that for every entity, there is a sufficient reason explaining why it exists. For example, if there is an explosion in a warehouse, the principle states that there must be an explanation for why the explosion occurred. There are disagreements about whether the principle is true and to which parts of reality it applies. In its broadest sense, it covers not only concrete entities but also abstract ones, such as explanations of mathematical truths. The principle is closely associated with rationalism and the idea that the world is thoroughly intelligible without brute or unexplainable facts.

== In various fields ==
=== Philosophy ===
The concept entity is relevant to many branches of philosophy. Metaphysics and ontology examine the fundamental structure of reality. They study what an entity is, which entities exist, and how they may be divided into categories of being. For example, they discuss the criteria that distinguish real entities from mere illusions and how distinct types of entities differ from each other, such as the contrast between particulars and universals. Other topics include composition and dependence as relations between entities as well as the roles of identity and boundaries in clarifying how entities are individuated.

Another area of philosophical research addresses the problem of reference, or how representations stand for entities. Philosophy of language and semantics examine linguistic reference: how words, such as names, relate to the entities they denote. For example, descriptivist theories of names assert that names refer to entities by implying an exhaustive description of the named entity, whereas direct-reference theories contend that names are directly linked to referents, denoting no descriptive content. A related topic in logic and formal semantics investigates the relation between expressions and entities in a domain of discourse, often formalized through an interpretation function that maps expressions, such as singular terms and predicates, to specific entities or sets of entities.

The problem of reference also concerns the philosophy of mind and the question of how mental states can refer to entities outside the mind. Another topic in this field addresses the existence of mental entities themselves and their relation to material entities. In the field of epistemology, philosophers examine how knowledge of entities in the world is possible. One question is whether perception establishes direct or indirect contact with the world by presenting worldly entities themselves or mere representations to the perceiver.

In some cases, different branches of philosophy conceive entity-related concepts differently, such as the concept criterion of identity: metaphysically, it concerns how the inherent structure of reality grounds identity and difference among entities; semantically, it concerns the meanings of expressions and the conditions under which they refer to the same entity; and epistemologically, it concerns how people identify, reidentify, and distinguish entities, or the evidence that makes this possible.

=== Information science and computer science ===
In information science and computer science, entities play a central role in knowledge representation and databases, which store information about a particular domain or universe of discourse. Entities are identifiable objects within a domain: they are the basic things represented by a knowledge base. A knowledge base can represent information about many types of entities, including inanimate things, living beings, events, and places. Represented entities often correspond to real-world entities, but this is not necessary since a universe of discourse can also include information about fictional, virtual, or hypothetical objects. (Note: If the represented entities have proper names or are identifiable individuals then the term named entity is often used in this context.)

Knowledge bases typically require that the represented entities are uniquely identifiable and thereby distinguishable from each other. For example, a knowledge base storing information about people should be able to distinguish individuals with identical names. A common way to achieve this is by assigning a unique identifier or primary key to each entity. The information stored on an entity can include attributes, such as age and profession in a database about people. Relational databases, like those following the entity–relationship model, also store information about relations between entities, such as an employment relationship in which one person works for another. A knowledge graph is a specific type of knowledge representation that focuses on relations between entities: it is made up of nodes, which represent entities, and edges, which represent relations between entities.

Information in knowledge bases is often stored in a form that both humans and computers can understand. A machine-readable structure can support the use of the information in automated reasoning to draw new inferences. Entity linking is a form of text analysis that aims to identify which entities in a knowledge base correspond to the entities discussed in a particular text. This type of natural language processing relies on contextual information to decide which of several possible candidates in a knowledge base is meant. For example, if the name Michael Jordan appears in a text and a knowledge base contains several people with that name, a computer program may use other contextual information, such as biographical facts in the text, to determine which Michael Jordan is meant.

Knowledge bases can be organized using domain ontologies, which are general frameworks that formalize the concepts, categories, and relations in a particular domain. Domain ontologies can ensure consistent representation of entities in a knowledge base and help promote interoperability between software systems by formatting data according to shared standards. A domain ontology can itself follow a more general set of standards associated with an upper ontology. Upper ontologies describe domain-independent types of entities, such as the distinction between concrete and abstract objects, and relations between entities, such as part-whole relations.

=== Other fields ===
In the field of law, a legal entity is a person or organization that has rights and responsibilities. These rights and responsibilities include the ability to enter into contracts, own property, and sue and be sued. Legal entities are typically divided into natural and artificial persons. A natural person is a human being, whereas an artificial or juridical person is a legally recognized non-human entity, such as an organization or institution.

In economics, an economic entity is a business unit engaged in economic activity. Economic entities are often legal entities, but the two concepts can come apart, for example, when several legal entities form a partnership that acts as a single economic entity. In accounting, the entity concept is the principle that a business is treated as a separate entity distinct from its owners. It implies, for example, that expenses incurred by the owners for private matters are not listed as business expenses. In politics, a political entity or polity is a political organization or unit, such as a state or a city. In social psychology, entitativity is the extent to which a group is perceived as a coherent and unified entity rather than as a mere aggregate of separate people.

In chemistry, a molecular entity is a chemical unit, such as an atom or molecule. In medicine, a disease entity is a recognizable pattern that corresponds to a disease, including signs and symptoms as well as the causal structure responsible for them.

== History ==
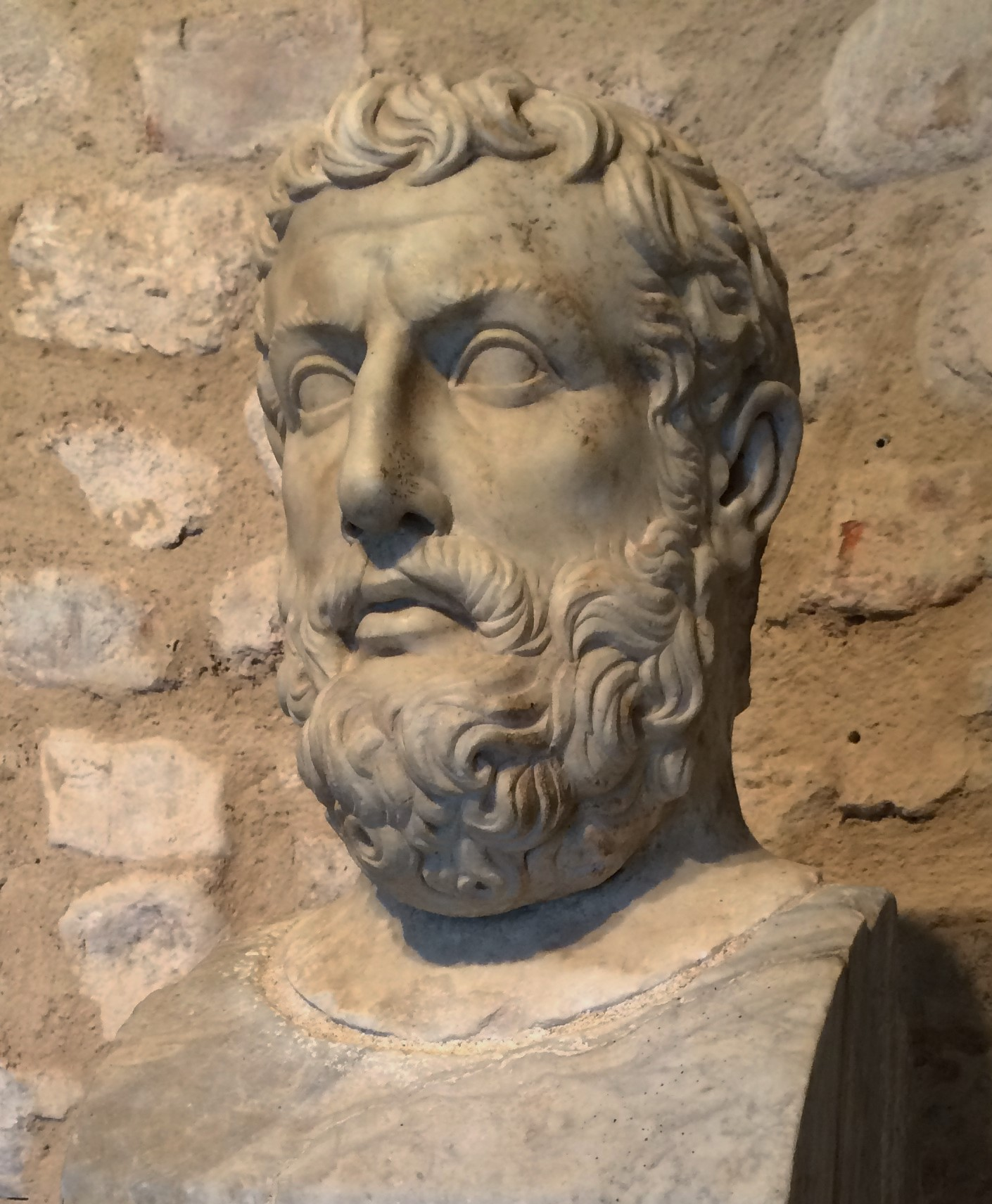
Heraclitus (left) held that all things are in constant flux, whereas Parmenides insisted that true being is stable and immutable.

Philosophical discussions of the nature of entities and related concepts, such as being, object, and substance, originated in antiquity. In ancient Greek thought, Heraclitus (c. 540 – c. 480 BCE) suggested that all things are in constant flux, whereas Parmenides (c. 515 – c. 450 BCE) contended that true being is unchanging. Parmenides also rejected the reality of negative entities or what is not, arguing that non-being neither exists nor can be thought of without contradiction. (Note: According to a common interpretation, Parmenides also accepted a form of monism according to which concrete reality consists of a single entity, not a multiplicity of entities.) Leucippus (fl. 5th century BCE) and his student Democritus (c. 460 – c. 370 BCE) proposed atomism, arguing that the material world is composed of indivisible entities called atoms.

Plato (c. 427 – c. 347 BCE) distinguished two realms of entities: the intelligible realm of unchanging forms apprehended by reason and the material realm of mutable entities apprehended by the senses. His student Aristotle (384–322 BCE) examined different categories of being. He held that substances have the most fundamental mode of existence, while other types of entities, such as qualities, are modifications of substances and depend on them. Aristotle also developed hylomorphism, describing material entities as composites of form and matter, and proposed the law of identity, stating that each entity is identical to itself. Plutarch (c. 45 – c. 125 CE) discussed the Ship of Theseus as a thought experiment to examine whether entities such as a ship can survive changes and remain identical as their parts are gradually replaced, a problem later also explored by Thomas Hobbes (1588–1679 CE).

The atomist idea of indivisible material entities was also proposed in Indian philosophy during the first millennium BCE by the schools of Jainism and, later, by Nyaya and Vaisheshika. Vaisheshika also developed a system of categories of being: the initial system contained six positive types of entities, such as substance and quality. Later, a seventh category for negative entities or non-existence was added to describe absences, such as the fact or awareness that something is missing. The school of Samkhya proposed a dualist ontology based on two types of entities: individual souls, which act as passive centers of pure consciousness, and matter, which is the source of activity and undergoes changes. In ancient China starting in the 5th century BCE, the School of Names examined the linguistic norms by which entities are considered to be the same or different. This tradition often relied on puzzles and paradoxes to challenge established standards of knowledge, such as Gongsun Long's (c. 320 – c. 250 BCE) White Horse Discourse suggesting that a white horse is not a horse. Starting in the third century CE, the school of xuanxue explored the relation between being and non-being, suggesting that non-being is the source from which all entities arise.

A central topic in medieval Western philosophy was the problem of universals: whether there are universal entities and, if so, whether they exist independently of the mind. This problem was discussed by philosophers such as Boethius (c. 480–524 CE), Peter Abelard (1079–1142 CE), and William of Ockham (c. 1287–1347 CE). Ockham also proposed the principle of Ockham's razor, according to which theories should posit as few entities as required for explanation. Avicenna (980–1037 CE) in Islamic philosophy and Thomas Aquinas (1225–1274 CE) in Christian philosophy held that some entities are contingent, while others, such as God, are necessary. Both distinguished between the essence and the existence of an entity, contrasting the intrinsic nature of a thing with the fact that it is. Addressing the problem of identity, Duns Scotus (c. 1265–1308 CE) suggested that each entity has a unique individual essence, called haecceity. An entity's haecceity distinguishes it from all other entities, acting as a pure thisness without any qualitative content.

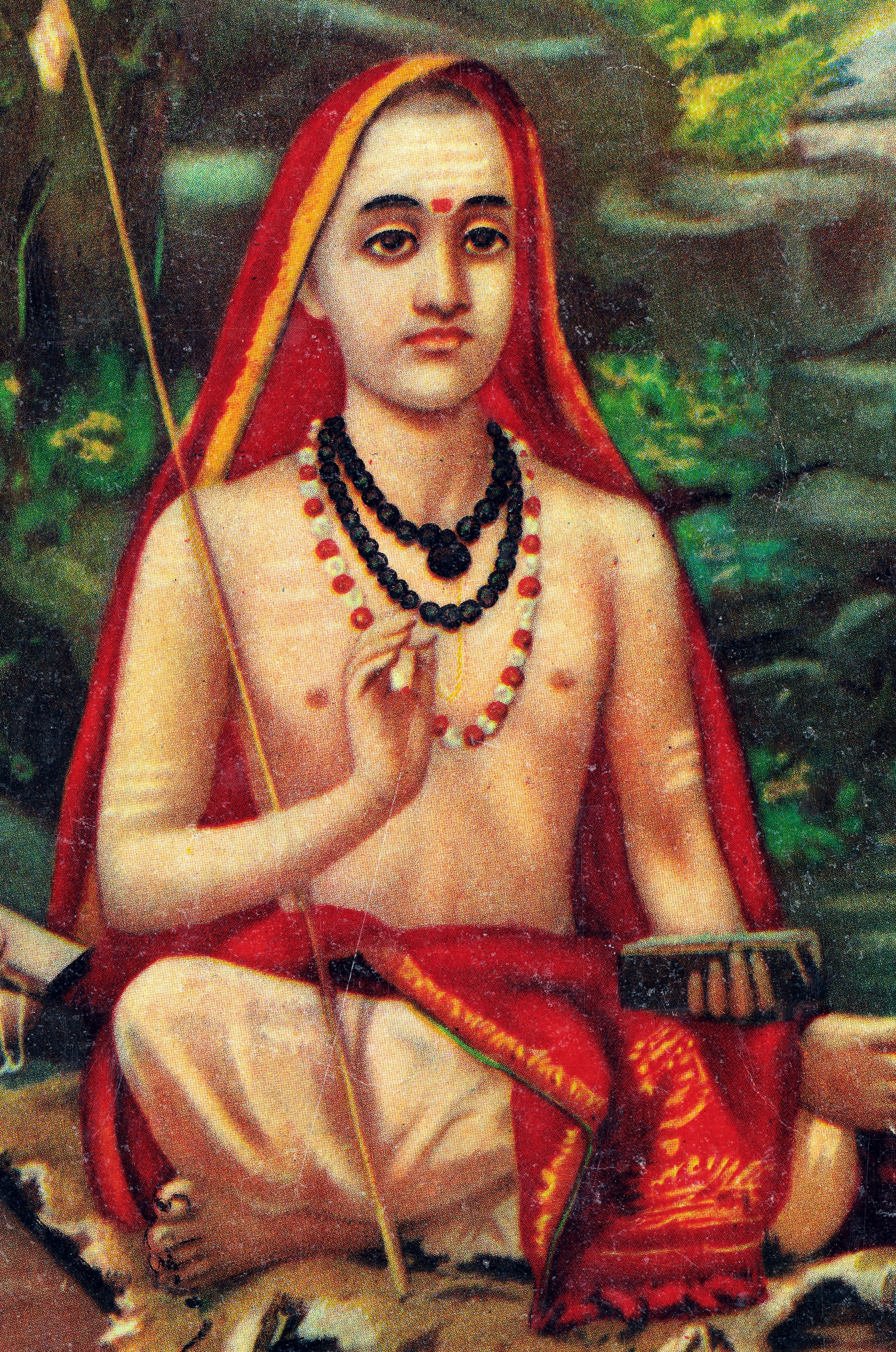
Adi Shankara rejected the experienced multiplicity of separate entities, regarding it as an illusion that obscures the fundamental unity of reality.

In medieval Indian philosophy, the school of Advaita Vedanta, founded by Adi Shankara in the 8th century CE, held that reality consists of a single unified entity and that the experienced multiplicity of separate entities is an illusion. This view was opposed by Dvaita Vedanta, which was conceived by Madhva in the 13th century CE. Dvaita Vedanta distinguished between God, who has independent existence, and other entities, which exist separately but depend on God.

In early modern philosophy, René Descartes (1596–1650) proposed substance dualism, asserting that mental entities, such as thoughts, are fundamentally different from material entities or bodies. Baruch Spinoza (1632–1677) rejected Descartes's mind–body dualism. Instead, he proposed a form of substance monism according to which only a single independent entity exists, which he termed God or Nature. John Locke (1632–1704) distinguished three types of entities: substances are independent entities, modes are dependent entities, and relations are connections between substances. Gottfried Wilhelm Leibniz (1646–1716) argued that the world consists of many simple substances, called monads, and proposed the identity of indiscernibles—the principle that no two distinct entities can have exactly the same properties. Leibniz also developed the principle of sufficient reason, which includes the idea that there is a sufficient reason for the existence of an entity, a theory later also explored by Arthur Schopenhauer (1788–1860). Immanuel Kant (1724–1804) examined the limits of knowledge of entities. He distinguished between appearances, which can be known, and things-in-themselves, which underlie those appearances but cannot be known.

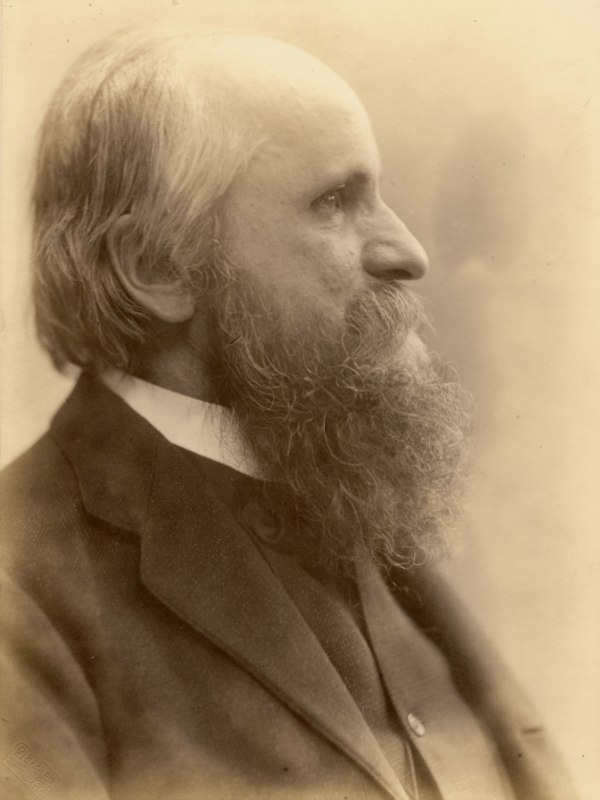
Alexius Meinong's theory of objects examines entities in the widest sense, including those that do not exist.

Franz Brentano (1838–1917) studied intentional objects as the entities toward which mental states are directed. His student Edmund Husserl (1859–1938) developed formal ontology to describe general features and fundamental categories relevant to entities in all domains, such as object, state of affairs, part, and whole. Martin Heidegger (1889–1976), who studied under Husserl, developed the idea of the ontological difference, distinguishing beings or individual entities from being as the fundamental condition that makes all individual entities intelligible.

Alexius Meinong (1853–1920) proposed a general theory of objects that describes entities in the widest sense, irrespective of whether they are existent, possible, or complete. Bertrand Russell (1872–1970) rejected Meinong's idea of non-existent objects. He proposed his theory of descriptions as an alternative approach to explain statements about fictional or impossible entities without assuming the existence of such entities. W. V. O. Quine (1908–2000) shared Russell's doubts about non-existent entities, arguing that they lack adequate criteria of identity. He proposed the principle "no entity without identity", according to which something does not qualify as an entity if there are no criteria for whether it is identical to or different from something else. Rejecting this requirement, E. J. Lowe (1950–2014) distinguished between what is identifiable and what is countable. He held that while typical entities are both identifiable and countable, some entities are only identifiable or only countable.

== See also ==
- Entity component system – Software architectural pattern mostly used in video game development
- Entity–control–boundary – Architectural concept used in software design
- Everything – All that exists
- Non-physical entity – Object that exists outside physical reality
