= Problem of the creator of God =

Philosophical problem

The problem of the creator of God is the controversy regarding the hypothetical cause responsible for the existence of God, assuming God exists. It contests the proposition that the universe cannot exist without a creator by asserting that the creator of the Universe must have the same restrictions. This, in turn, may lead to a problem of infinite regress wherein each new presumed creator of a creator is presumed to have its own creator. A common challenge to theistic propositions of a creator deity as a necessary first cause of the universe is the question: "Who created God?" Some faith traditions have such an element as part of their doctrines. Jainism posits that the universe is eternal and has always existed. Isma'ilism rejects the idea of God as the first cause due to the doctrine of God's incomparability and source of existence, including abstract objects.

== God as the "Unmoved Mover" ==
In philosophy, the concept of an "unmoved mover" is traditionally attributed to the works of Aristotle, and was popularized in Christianity by Thomas Aquinas. The most famous use of the argument for an unmoved mover within Christianity comes from Aquinas' Summa Theologica, where he gives five ways to prove the existence of God. Aquinas does not reference God as a "creator" in his arguments, and none of their general structures resemble the problem of the creator of God. The arguments which may appear similar function by employing a reductio ad absurdum, which intends to show that it is impossible for there to not be an unmoved mover, first cause, or a "per se" necessary being. As some philosophers and theologians have pointed out, Jews, Christians, and some Muslims have historically identified their God with the preexisting concept of the unmoved mover, believing that this entity is the God which revealed himself to them. Given the similarities and differences between the problem of the creator of God and the treatment of God as an unmoved mover, it is possible that the one arises from a misunderstanding or a strawman of the other, especially in instances where special pleading occurs.

== Perspectives ==
Osho writes:

No, don't ask that. That's what all the religions say – don't ask who created God. But this is strange – why not? If the question is valid about existence, why does it become invalid when it is applied to God? And once you ask who created God, you are falling into a regress absurdum.

John Humphrys writes:

... if someone were able to provide the explanation, we would be forced to embark upon what philosophers call an infinite regress. Having established who created God, we would then have to answer the question of who created God's creator.

Alan Lurie writes:

In response to one of my blogs about God's purpose in the creation of the universe, one person wrote, "All you've done is divert the question. If God created the Universe, who created God? That is a dilemma that religious folks desperately try to avoid." The question, "Who created God?", has been pondered by theologians for millennia, and the answer is both surprisingly obvious and philosophically subtle ... whatever one thinks about the beginnings of the Universe, there is "something" at the very origin that was not created. This is an inescapable given, a cosmic truth.

Joseph Smith stated in the King Follett discourse:

God himself was once as we are now, and is an exalted man, and sits enthroned in yonder heavens! That is the great secret. If the veil were rent today, and the great God who holds this world in its orbit, and who upholds all worlds and all things by His power, was to make himself visible—I say, if you were to see him today, you would see him like a man in form—like yourselves in all the person, image, and very form as a man ... it is necessary we should understand the character and being of God and how He came to be so; for I am going to tell you how God came to be God. We have imagined and supposed that God was God from all eternity. I will refute that idea, and take away the veil ... It is the first principle of the gospel to know for a certainty the character of God, and to know that we may converse with Him as one man converses with another, and that He was once a man like us; yea, that God himself, the Father of us all, dwelt on an earth, the same as Jesus Christ Himself did ... Is it logic to say that a spirit is immortal and yet has a beginning? Because if a spirit has a beginning, it will have an end. ... All the fools and learned and wise men from the beginning of creation who say that man had a beginning prove that he must have an end. If that were so, the doctrine of annihilation would be true. But if I am right, I might with boldness proclaim from the house tops that God never did have power to create the spirit of man at all. God himself could not create himself. Intelligence exists upon a self-existent principle; it is a spirit from age to age, and there is no creation about it. Moreover, all the spirits that God ever sent into the world are susceptible to enlargement.

== Responses ==
Defenders of religion have countered that, by definition, God is the first cause, and thus that the question is improper:

We ask, "If all things have a creator, then who created God?" Actually, only created things have a creator, so it's improper to lump God with his creation. God has revealed himself to us in the Bible as having always existed.

Ray Comfort, author and evangelist, writes:

No person or thing created God. He created "time," and because we dwell in the dimension of time, reason demands that all things have a beginning and an end. God, however, dwells outside of the dimension of time. He moves through time as we flip through a history book...He dwells in "eternity," having no beginning or end.

Tzvi Freeman, Canadaian rabbi, writes on the official Chabad website:

Ibn Sina, the preeminent Arabic philosopher, answered this question a thousand years ago, when he described G-d [sic] as non-contingent, absolute existence. If so, to ask "Why is there G-d?" is the equivalent of asking, "Why is there is-ness?"

Atheists counter that there is no reason to assume the universe was created. The question becomes irrelevant if the universe is presumed to have circular time instead of linear time, undergoing an infinite series of big bangs and big crunches on its own.

John Lennox, professor of mathematics at Oxford, writes:

Now Dawkins candidly tells us that he does not like people telling him that they also do not believe in the God in which he does not believe. But we cannot afford to base our arguments on his dislikes. For, whether he likes it or not, he openly invites the charge. After all, it is he who is arguing that God is a delusion. In order to weigh his argument we need first of all to know what he means by God. And his main argument is focused on a created God. Well, several billion of us would share his disbelief in such a god. He needn't have bothered. Most of us have long since been convinced of what he is trying to tell us. Certainly, no Christian would ever dream of suggesting that God was created. Nor, indeed, would Jews or Muslims. His argument, by his own admission, has nothing to say about an eternal God. It is entirely beside the point. Dawkins should shelve it on the shelf marked 'Celestial Teapots' where it belongs. For the God who created and upholds the universe was not created – he is eternal. He was not 'made' and therefore subject to the laws that science discovered; it was he who made the universe with its laws. Indeed, that fact constitutes the fundamental distinction between God and the universe. The universe came to be, God did not.

== See also ==
- Creation ex materia
- Creator in Buddhism
- Demiurge
- Ex nihilo
- King Follett discourse
- Theotokos
- Turtles all the way down
- Ultimate Boeing 747 gambit
- "Why is there anything at all?"
