= Something (concept) =

Concept of an existence; not nothing

Something and anything are concepts of existence in ontology, contrasting with the concept of nothing. Both are used to describe the understanding that what exists is not nothing without needing to address the existence of everything. The philosopher, David Lewis, has pointed out that these are necessarily vague terms, asserting that "ontological assertions of common sense are correct if the quantifiers—such words as "something" and "anything"—are restricted roughly to ordinary or familiar things."

The idea that "something" is the opposite of "nothing" has existed at least since it was proposed by the Neoplatonist philosopher Porphyry in the 3rd century. One of the most basic questions of both science and philosophy is: why is there something rather than nothing at all? A question that follows from this is whether it is ever actually possible for there to be nothing at all, or whether there must always be something.

Grammatically, "something and anything are commonly classified as pronouns, although they do not stand for another noun so clearly as does thing itself, a word always classified as a noun".

== In predicate logic ==
In predicate logic, what is described in layman's terms as "something" can more specifically be regarded as existential quantification, that is, the predication of a property or relation to at least one member of the domain. It is a type of quantifier, a logical constant which is interpreted as "there exists," "there is at least one," or "for some." It expresses that a propositional function can be satisfied by at least one member of a domain of discourse. In other terms, it is the predication of a property or relation to at least one member of the domain. It asserts that a predicate within the scope of an existential quantifier is true of at least one value of a predicate variable.
