= Creatio ex materia =

View that the universe originates from pre-existing matter

Creatio ex materia is the notion that the universe was formed out of eternal, pre-existing matter. This is in contrast to the notion of creatio ex nihilo, where the universe is created out of nothing. The idea of creatio ex materia is found in ancient near eastern cosmology, early Greek cosmology such as is in the works of Homer and Hesiod, and across the board in ancient Greek philosophy. It was also held by a few early Christians, although creatio ex nihilo was the dominant concept among such writers. After the King Follet discourse, creatio ex materia came to be accepted in Mormonism.

Greek philosophers came to widely frame the notion of creatio ex materia with the philosophical dictum "nothing comes from nothing" (Greek: οὐδὲν ἐξ οὐδενός; Latin: ex nihilo nihil fit). Although it is not clear whether the dictum originated with Parmenides (5th century BC) or predates him among the Milesian philosophers, a more common version of the expression was coined by Lucretius, who stated in his De rerum natura that "nothing can be created out of nothing".

Alternatives to creatio ex materia include creatio ex nihilo ("creation from nothing"); creatio ex deo ("creation from God"), referring to a derivation of the cosmos from the substance of God either partially (in panentheism) or completely (in pandeism), and creatio continua (ongoing divine creation).

== Greek philosophy ==
Greek philosophers widely accepted the notion that creation acted on eternally existing, uncreated matter. Parmenides' articulation of the dictum that "nothing comes from nothing" is first attested in Aristotle's Physics:

τί δ᾽ ἄν μιν καὶ χρέος ὦρσεν ὕστερον ἢ πρόσθεν, τοῦ μηδενὸς ἀρξάμενον, φῦν; οὕτως ἢ πάμπαν πελέναι χρεών ἐστιν ἢ οὐχί.

In English translation:

Yet why would it be created later rather than sooner, if it came from nothing? So, it must either be created altogether or not [created at all].

Though commonly credited to Parmenides, some historians believe that the dictum instead historically traces back to the Milesian philosophers. In any case, Parmenides believed that non-existence could not give rise to existence (genesis), since that which does not exist has no causal powers, nor could something that exists simply cease to exist (perishing).

A typical expression of it can be found in the writings of the Middle Platonist Plutarch, which conditions that the structured and formed things that exist now derive from earlier, unformed and unshaped matter. Therefore, the creation act was the process of ordering this unordered matter.

The Roman poet and Epicurean philosopher Lucretius expressed this principle in the first book of his De rerum natura (On the Nature of Things) (1.149–214). According to his argument, if something could come from nothing, it would be commonplace to observe something coming from nothing all the time, even to witness any animal emerge fully-made or to see trees at one point bearing an apple but later producing a pear. This is because there is no prerequisite for what would come out of nothing, as prior causes or matter would have no place in limiting what comes into existence. In short, Lucretius believed that creatio ex nihilo would lead to a lack of regularity in nature.

In their interaction with earlier Greek philosophers who accepted this argument or dictum, Christian authors who accepted creatio ex nihilo, like Origen, simply denied the essential premise that something cannot come from nothing, and viewed it as a presumption of a limitation of God's power; God was seen as in fact able to create something out of nothing.

== See also ==
- Antimetabole
- Creatio ex nihilo
- Empedocles
- Eternity of the world
- Jainism and non-creationism
- Melissus of Samos
- Nothing from Nothing (Billy Preston song)
- Principle of sufficient reason
- Problem of the creator of God
- Spontaneous symmetry breaking
- Vacuum energy
- Why is there anything at all?
