= Special pleading =

Informal fallacy

Special pleading is an informal fallacy wherein a person claims an exception to a general or universal principle, but the exception is unjustified. It applies a double standard.

In the classic distinction among material fallacies, cognitive fallacies, and formal fallacies, special pleading most likely falls within the category of cognitive fallacy, because it would seem to relate to "lip service", rationalization, and diversion (abandonment of discussion). Special pleading also often resembles the "appeal to" logical fallacies.

== Examples ==
A difficult case is when a possible criticism is made relatively immune to investigation. This immunity may take the forms of:

- Creation of an ad-hoc exception to prevent the rule from backfiring against the claim:
  - Example: Everyone has a duty to help the police do their job, no matter who the suspect is. That is why we must support investigations into corruption in the police department. No person is above the law. Of course, if the police come knocking on my door to ask about my neighbors and the robberies in our building, I know nothing. I’m not about to rat on anybody.
- "You aren't like me, so you do not even have a right to think about or hold opinions on my plight."
  - Example: Keep your advice to yourself. If you didn't grow up the way I did, then you can't understand.

== Statistical ==
This variation occurs when the interpretation of the relevant statistic is "massaged" by looking for ways to reclassify or requantify data from one portion of results, but not applying the same scrutiny to other categories.

== Misuses ==
Misuses may occur when it is not understood why something is an exception or when an incorrect exception is applied non-fallaciously or in ignorance.

- Misunderstanding; the exception is justified or necessary but the objector does not understand why:
  - Example: John is committing special pleading by saying that he only likes his own dog.
  - Another common example comes from the conflation of the Problem of the Creator of God with the concept of the Unmoved Mover.
- Incorrect Exception; the fallacy does not occur when the exception proposed is believed to be valid but is in actuality not. In these cases, the invalidity is due to the argument having an implied untrue premise. Special pleading only occurs when the invalid exception is deliberately or carelessly applied:
  - Example: This storm will ruin your lawn but not mine. That's because I'm crossing my fingers, which is lucky.

== See also ==
- Cherry picking (fallacy)
- Courtier's reply
- Exceptionalism
- Exception that proves the rule
- Hard cases make bad law
- Moving the goalposts
- No true Scotsman
- Problem of the creator of God
- Relativist fallacy
