= Nothing =

Complete absence of anything; the opposite of everything

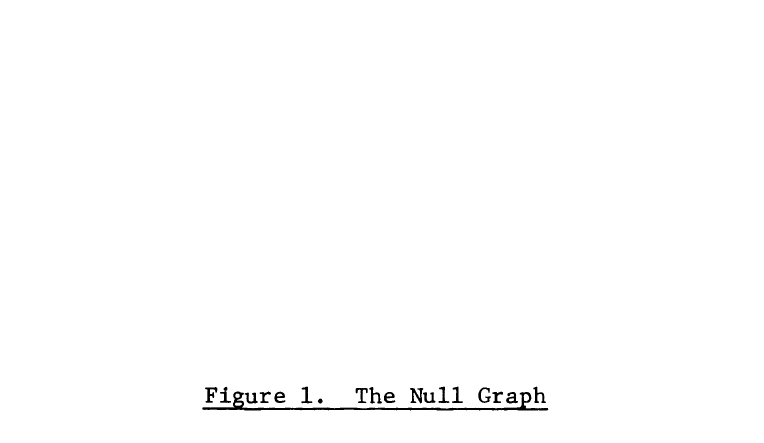
Illustration of a null graph, which is empty and edgeless

Nothing, no-thing, or no thing is the complete absence of anything, as the opposite of something and an antithesis of everything. The concept of nothing has been a matter of philosophical debate since at least the 5th century BCE. Early Greek philosophers argued that it was impossible for nothing to "exist". The atomists allowed nothing but only in the spaces between the invisibly small atoms. For them, all space was filled with atoms. Aristotle took the view that there exists matter and there exists space, a receptacle into which matter objects can be placed. This became the paradigm for classical scientists of the modern age, like Isaac Newton. Nevertheless, some philosophers, like René Descartes, continued to argue against the existence of empty space until the scientific discovery of a physical vacuum.

Existentialists like Jean-Paul Sartre and Martin Heidegger (as interpreted by Sartre) have associated nothing with consciousness. Some writers have made connections between Heidegger's concept of nothing and the nirvana of Eastern religions.

Modern science does not equate vacuum with nothing. The vacuum in quantum field theory is filled with virtual particles. The quantum vacuum is often viewed as a modern version of an aether theory.

== Philosophy ==
=== Western ===
Some would consider the study of "nothing" to be absurd. A typical response of this type is voiced by the Venetian Giacomo Casanova in conversation with his landlord, one Dr. Gozzi, who also happens to be a priest:

As everything, for him, was an article of faith, nothing, to his mind, was difficult to understand: the Great Flood had covered the entire world; before, men had the misfortune of living a thousand years; God conversed with them; Noah had taken one hundred years to build the ark; while the earth, suspended in air, stood firmly at the center of the universe that God had created out of nothingness. When I said to him, and proved to him, that the existence of nothingness was absurd, he cut me short, calling me silly.

"Nothingness" has been treated as a serious subject for a very long time. In philosophy, to avoid linguistic traps over the meaning of "nothing", a phrase such as not-being is often employed to make clear what is being discussed.

==== Parmenides ====
One of the earliest Western philosophers to consider nothing as a concept was Parmenides (5th century BCE), a Greek philosopher of the monist school. He argued that "nothing" cannot exist by the following line of reasoning: To speak of a thing, one has to speak of a thing that exists. If one can speak of a thing in the past, this thing must still exist (in some sense) now, and from this, he concluded that there is no such thing as change. As a corollary, there can be no such things as coming-into-being, passing-out-of-being, or not-being.

Other philosophers, for instance, Socrates and Plato largely agreed with Parmenides's reasoning on nothing. Aristotle differs with Parmenides's conception of nothing and says, "Although these opinions seem to follow logically in a dialectical discussion, yet to believe them seems next door to madness when one considers the facts."

In modern times, Albert Einstein's concept of spacetime has led many scientists, including Einstein himself, to adopt a position remarkably similar to Parmenides. On the death of his friend Michele Besso, Einstein consoled his widow with the words, "Now he has departed from this strange world a little ahead of me. That signifies nothing. For those of us that believe in physics, the distinction between past, present and future is only a stubbornly persistent illusion."

==== Leucippus ====
Leucippus (early 5th century BCE), one of the atomists, along with other philosophers of his time, made attempts to reconcile this monism with the everyday observation of motion and change. He accepted the monist position that there could be no motion without a void. The void is the opposite of being. It is not-being. On the other hand, there exists something known as an absolute plenum, a space filled with matter, and there can be no motion in a plenum because it is completely full. But, there is not just one monolithic plenum, for existence consists of a multiplicity of plenums. These are the invisibly small "atoms" of Greek atomist theory, later expanded by Democritus (c. 460–370 BCE), which allows the void to "exist" between them. In this scenario, macroscopic objects can come-into-being, move through space, and pass into not-being by means of the coming together and moving apart of their constituent atoms. The void must exist to allow this to happen, or else the "frozen world" of Parmenides must be accepted.

Bertrand Russell points out that this does not exactly defeat the argument of Parmenides but, rather, ignores it by taking the rather modern scientific position of starting with the observed data (motion, etc.) and constructing a theory based on the data, as opposed to Parmenides' attempts to work from pure logic. Russell also observes that both sides were mistaken in believing that there can be no motion in a plenum, but arguably motion cannot start in a plenum. Cyril Bailey notes that Leucippus is the first to say that a "thing" (the void) might be real without being a body and points out the irony that this comes from a materialistic atomist. Leucippus is therefore the first to say that "nothing" has a reality attached to it.

==== Aristotle, Newton, Descartes ====
Aristotle (384–322 BCE) provided the classic escape from the logical problem posed by Parmenides by distinguishing things that are matter and things that are space. In this scenario, space is not "nothing" but, rather, a receptacle in which objects of matter can be placed. The true void (as "nothing") is different from "space" and is removed from consideration. This characterization of space reached its pinnacle with Isaac Newton who asserted the existence of absolute space. René Descartes, on the other hand, returned to a Parmenides-like argument of denying the existence of space. For Descartes, there was matter, and there was extension of matter leaving no room for the existence of "nothing".

The idea that space can actually be empty was generally still not accepted by philosophers who invoked arguments similar to the plenum reasoning. Although Descartes' views on this were challenged by Blaise Pascal, he declined to overturn the traditional belief, horror vacui, commonly stated as "nature abhors a vacuum". This remained so until Evangelista Torricelli invented the barometer in 1643 and showed that an empty space appeared if the mercury tube was turned upside down. This phenomenon being known as the Torricelli vacuum and the unit of vacuum pressure, the torr, being named after him. Even Torricelli's teacher, Galileo Galilei, had previously been unable to adequately explain the sucking action of a pump.

==== John the Scot ====
John the Scot, or Johannes Scotus Eriugena (c. 815–877) held many surprisingly heretical beliefs for the time he lived in for which no action appears ever to have been taken against him. His ideas mostly stem from, or are based on his work of translating pseudo-Dionysius. His beliefs are essentially pantheist, and he classifies evil, amongst many other things, into not-being. This is done on the grounds that evil is the opposite of good, a quality of God, but God can have no opposite, since God is everything in the pantheist view of the world. Similarly, the idea that God created the world out of "nothing" is to be interpreted as meaning that the "nothing" here is synonymous with God.

==== G. W. F. Hegel ====
Georg Wilhelm Friedrich Hegel (1770–1831) is the philosopher who brought the dialectical method to a new pinnacle of development. According to Hegel in Science of Logic, the dialectical methods consists of three steps. First, a thesis is given, which can be any proposition in logic. Second, the antithesis of the thesis is formed and, finally, a synthesis incorporating both thesis and antithesis. Hegel believed that no proposition taken by itself can be completely true. Only the whole can be true, and the dialectical synthesis was the means by which the whole could be examined in relation to a specific proposition. Truth consists of the whole process. Separating out thesis, antithesis, or synthesis as a stand-alone statement results in something that is in some way or other untrue. The concept of "nothing" arises in Hegel right at the beginning of his Logic. The whole is called by Hegel the "Absolute" and is to be viewed as something spiritual. Hegel then has:

- Thesis: the absolute is pure being
- Antithesis: the absolute is nothing
- Synthesis: the absolute is becoming

==== Existentialists ====
The most prominent figure among the existentialists is Jean-Paul Sartre, whose ideas in his book Being and Nothingness (L'être et le néant) are heavily influenced by Being and Time (Sein und Zeit) of Martin Heidegger, although Heidegger later stated that he was misunderstood by Sartre. Sartre defines two kinds of "being" (être). One kind is être-en-soi, the brute existence of things such as a tree. The other kind is être-pour-soi which is consciousness. Sartre claims that this second kind of being is "nothing" since consciousness cannot be an object of consciousness and can possess no essence. Sartre, and even more so, Jaques Lacan, use this conception of nothing as the foundation of their atheist philosophy. Equating nothingness with being leads to creation from nothing and hence God is no longer needed for there to be existence.

=== Eastern ===
The understanding of "nothing" varies widely between cultures, especially between Western and Eastern cultures and philosophical traditions. For instance, śūnyatā (emptiness), unlike "nothingness", is considered to be a state of mind in some forms of Buddhism (see nirvana, mu, and bodhi). Achieving "nothing" as a state of mind in this tradition allows one to be totally focused on a thought or activity at a level of intensity that they would not be able to achieve if they were consciously thinking. A classic example of this is an archer attempting to erase the mind and clear the thoughts to better focus on the shot. Some authors have pointed to similarities between the Buddhist conception of nothingness and the ideas of Martin Heidegger and existentialists like Sartre, although this connection has not been explicitly made by the philosophers themselves.

In some Eastern philosophies, the concept of "nothingness" is characterized by an egoless state of being in which one fully realizes one's own small part in the cosmos. The Kyoto School handles the concept of nothingness as well.

==== Taoism ====
Laozi and Zhuangzi were both conscious that language is powerless in the face of the ultimate. In Taoist philosophy, however real this world is, its main characteristic is impermanence, whereas the Tao has a permanence that cannot be described, predetermined, or named. In this way the Tao is different from any thing that can be named. It is nonexistence, in other words, nothing.

Taoists also have the related concept of wu wei.

== Science ==
Despite the proven existence of vacuum, scientists through the 17th to 19th centuries thought there must be a medium pervading all space that allowed the transmission of light or gravity. Thus, in this period, it was not accepted that complete nothing was possible. Theories describing such a medium are collectively known as aether theories, so named as an evocation of the aether, the classical element from Greek philosophy. In particular, the medium that is supposed to allow the transmission of light is called the luminiferous aether. This became the centre of attention after James Clerk Maxwell proposed that light was an electromagnetic wave in 1865.

Early aether theories include those of Robert Hooke (1665) and Christiaan Huygens (1690). Newton also had an aether theory, but to Newton, it was not the medium of transmission since he theorised light was composed of "corpuscles" which moved by simple mechanical motion. He needed the aether instead to explain refraction. Early theories generally proposed a mechanical medium of some sort, allowing the possibility of the same medium supporting both light and gravity. Proof that light has a wave nature, rather than Newton's corpuscles, was provided by Thomas Young in his 1803 interference experiment, seemingly confirming the need for an aether. The most well known attempt to detect the existence of the aether was the Michelson–Morley experiment conducted by Albert A. Michelson in 1881, later repeated with Edward W. Morley in 1887 with more precision. This failed to show the desired effect, but reluctant to abandon the aether theory, various attempts were made to modify it to account for the Michelson-Morley result. Finally, Albert Einstein, building on the work of Hendrik Lorentz, published his theory of special relativity in 1905 which dispenses entirely with the need for a luminiferous aether to explain the transmission of light.

Although a physical medium was no longer required, the concept of aether still did not entirely vanish. It remained necessary to assign properties to the vacuum for various purposes. In some respects vacuum and aether are treated as synonyms by science. In modern quantum field theory, a completely empty vacuum is not at zero-point energy, the lowest possible energy state. First proposed by Paul Dirac in 1927, the lowest energy state has constant random vacuum fluctuations which bring into existence short-lived virtual particles. This is somewhat reminiscent of early philosophical plenum ideas, and means that vacuum and nothing are certainly not synonyms.

While studying Kaluza–Klein theory, Edward Witten proposed the possible formation of a bubble of nothing in 1982, a singularity with no interior, not even spacetime.

== Mathematics ==
A well-known usage of the term "nothing" in mathematics is the number 0, which is neither a positive number nor a negative number. It's sometimes included in the set of natural numbers, denoted by $N$, but it's always included in the set of real numbers, denoted by $R$. "Nothing" can also apply to empty sets, indicated by the symbol $\emptyset$, whose size or cardinality is 0. A much more abstract form of the term "nothing" in mathematics is the zero object in category theory.

== See also ==
- Absolute zero
- Affirmation and negation
- Big Bounce
- Creatio ex nihilo
- Dark matter
- Darkness
- Empty
- Eternal oblivion
- False vacuum
- Meontology
- Meaning of life
- Nihilism
- No
- Nobody
- Vacuous truth
- Void
- Why is there anything at all?
