= Everything =

All that exists

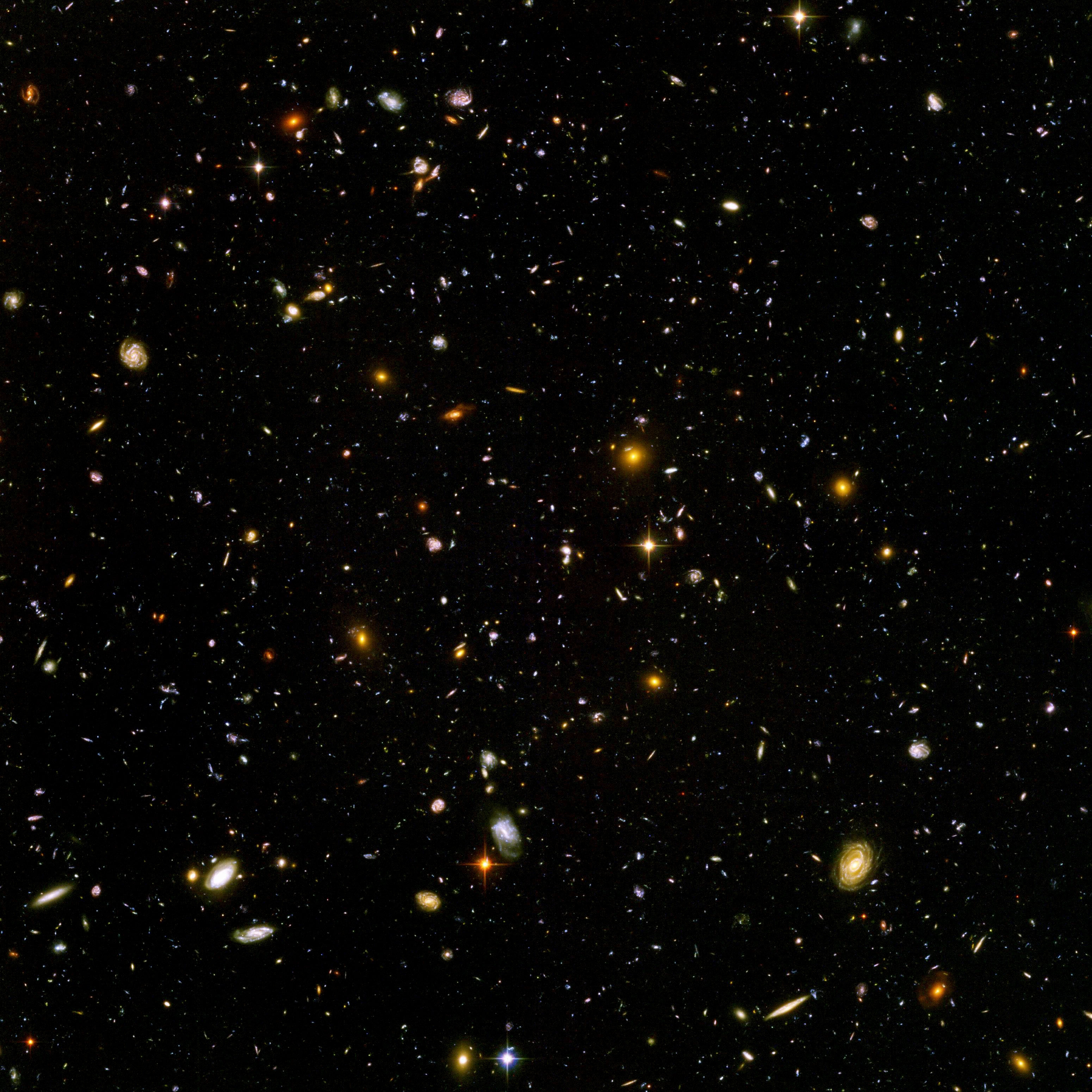
In theoretical physics, the universe (depending on its definition) and all it comprises, is everything. (Hubble Ultra-Deep Field image of distant galaxies pictured)

Everything, every-thing, or every thing, is all that exists. As this encompasses the totality of things relevant to some subject matter, it can be understood in many different ways.

In an anthropocentric worldview, it may be understood as the sum of human experience, history, and the human condition in general, or that of all living beings. Other worldviews may view every object and entity as part of everything, including all physical bodies and in some cases all abstract objects.

To describe or know of everything as a spatial consideration in a local environment, such as the world in which humans mostly live, is possible. The determination of all things in the universe is unknown because of the physics beyond the observed universe and the problem of knowing physics at the range infinite. To know everything universally as a temporal and spatial consideration isn't possible because of the unavailability of information at a certain time before the beginning of the universe and because of the problem of eternal causality.

== Scope ==
In ordinary conversation, everything usually refers only to the totality of things relevant to the subject matter. When there is no expressed limitation, everything may refer to the universe, or the world or all the things in a room.

The universe is most commonly defined as everything that physically exists: the entirety of time, all forms of matter, energy and momentum, and the physical laws and constants that govern them. However, the term "universe" may be used in slightly different contextual senses, denoting such concepts as the cosmos, the world, or nature. According to some speculations, this universe may be one of many disconnected universes collectively denoted as the multiverse. In the bubble universe theory, there are an infinite variety of universes, each with different physical constants. In the many-worlds hypothesis, new universes are spawned with every quantum measurement. By definition, these speculations cannot currently be tested experimentally, yet, if multiple universes do exist, they would still be part of everything.

Especially in a metaphysical context, World may refer to everything that constitutes reality and the universe: see World (philosophy). However, world may only refer to Earth envisioned from an anthropocentric or human worldview, as a place by human beings.

== In theoretical physics ==
In theoretical physics, a theory of everything (TOE) is a hypothetical theory that fully explains and links together all known physical phenomena. Initially, the term was used with an ironic connotation to refer to various overgeneralized theories. For example, a great-grandfather of Ijon Tichy—a character from a cycle of Stanisław Lem's science fiction stories of the 1960s—was known to work on the "General Theory of Everything". Over time, the term stuck in popularizations of quantum physics to describe a theory that would unify or explain through a single model the theories of all fundamental interactions in nature.

There have been many theories of everything proposed by theoretical physicists over the last century, but none have been confirmed experimentally. The primary problem in producing a TOE is that the accepted theories of quantum mechanics, general relativity, and special relativity are hard to combine. Theories exploring quantum mechanics and string theory are easier to combine.

Based on theoretical holographic principle arguments from the 1990s, many physicists believe that 11-dimensional M-theory, which is described in many sectors by matrix string theory, and in many other sectors by perturbative string theory, is the complete theory of everything. Other physicists disagree.

== In philosophy ==
In philosophy, a theory of everything or TOE is an ultimate, all-encompassing explanation of nature or reality. Adopting the term from physics, where the search for a theory of everything is ongoing, philosophers have discussed the viability of the concept and analyzed its properties and implications. Among the questions to be addressed by a philosophical theory of everything are: "Why is reality understandable?", "Why are the laws of nature as they are?", and "Why is there anything at all?".

== See also ==
- Alpha and Omega
- Modal collapse – Concept in modal logic
- Something (concept)
- Trivialism — The logical theory that every statement (or everything) is true
