= Entity concept =

Idea that a business has separate transactional existence from its owners

In accounting, a business or an organization and its owners are treated as two separate parties. This is called the entity concept. The business stands apart from other organizations as a separate economic unit. It is necessary to record the business's transactions separately, to distinguish them from the owners' personal transactions. This helps to give a correct determination of the true financial condition of the business. This concept can be extended to accounting separately for the various divisions of a business in order to ascertain the financial results for each division. Under the business entity concept, a business holds separate entity and distinct from its owners. "The entity view holds the business 'enterprise to be an institution in its own right separate and distinct from the parties who furnish the funds"

An example is a sole trader or proprietorship. The sole trader takes money from the business by way of 'drawings', money for their own personal use. Despite it being the sole trader's business and technically their money, there are still two aspects to the transaction: the business is 'giving' money and the individual is 'receiving' money. Even though there is no other legal distinction between the sole trader and the business, and the sole trader is liable for all of the debts of the business, business transactions may be taxed separately from personal transactions, and the proprietor of the business may also find it useful to see the financial results of the business. For these reasons, the affairs of the individuals behind a business are kept separate from the affairs of the business itself.

== In Anthropology ==
The term has been coined by British anthropologist Mark Lindley-Highfield of Ballumbie Castle to describe ideas, such as ‘the West’, which are given agentive status as though they are homogeneous real things, where this entity-concept can have different symbolic values attributed to it to those of the individuals making up the group, who on an individual basis can be perceived differently. Lindley-Highfield explains it thus: ‘the discourse flows at two levels: One at which ideological disembodied concepts are seen to compete and contest, that have an agency of their own and can have agency acted out against them; and another at which people are individuals and may be distinct from the concepts held about their broader society.’
