= Creatio ex nihilo =

Doctrine that matter was created from nothing

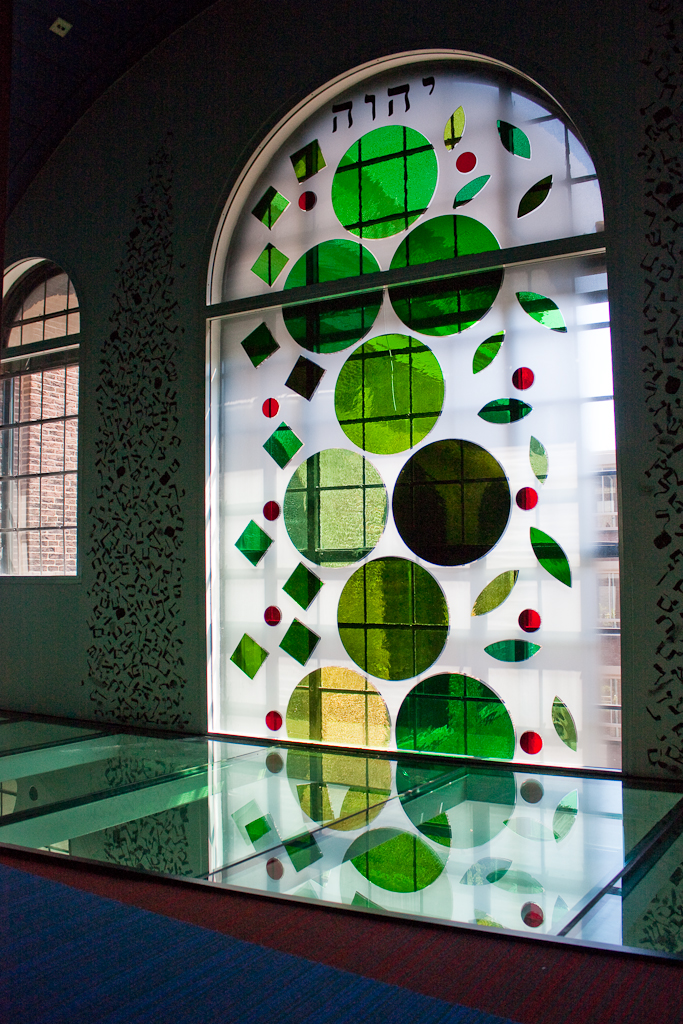
Tree of Life by Eli Content at the Joods Historisch Museum. The Tree of Life, or Etz haChayim (עץ החיים) in Hebrew, is a mystical symbol used in the Kabbalah of esoteric Judaism to describe the path to HaShem and the manner in which he created the world ex nihilo (out of nothing).

Creatio ex nihilo (Latin, 'creation out of nothing') or nihilogony is the doctrine that matter is not eternal but had to be created by some divine creative act. It is a theistic answer to the question of how the universe came to exist. It is in contrast to creatio ex materia and foundationalism (creation from matter resulting from logical aseity, also known as Resultante ex Aseitate Logica, but modern foundationalism is cosmological with improvements from the 17th-century viewpoint that are sometimes framed in terms of the dictum ex nihilo nihil fit or 'nothing comes from nothing', meaning all things were formed ex materia—that is, from pre-existing things).

== Creatio ex materia ==
Creatio ex materia refers to the idea that matter has always existed and that the modern cosmos is a reformation of pre-existing, primordial matter; it is sometimes articulated by the philosophical dictum that nothing can come from nothing.

In ancient Near Eastern cosmology, the universe is formed ex materia from eternal formless matter, namely the dark and still primordial ocean of chaos. In Sumerian myth, this cosmic ocean is personified as the goddess Nammu "who gave birth to heaven and earth" and had existed forever; in the Babylonian creation epic Enūma Eliš, pre-existent chaos is made up of freshwater Apsu and saltwater Tiamat, and from Tiamat, the god Marduk created Heaven and Earth; in Egyptian creation myths, a pre-existent watery chaos personified as the god Nun, and associated with darkness, gave birth to the primeval hill (or in some versions, a primeval lotus flower, or in others, a celestial cow); and in Greek traditions, the ultimate origin of the universe, depending on the source, is sometimes Oceanus (a river that circles the Earth), Night, or water.

== In Genesis ==
Similarly, the Genesis creation narrative opens with the Hebrew phrase bereshit bara elohim et hashamayim ve'et ha'aretz, which can be interpreted in at least three ways:

1. As a statement that the cosmos had an absolute beginning (In the beginning, God created the heavens and earth...)
2. As a statement describing the condition of the world when God began creating (When God began to create the heavens and the earth, the earth was formless...)
3. As background information (When, in the beginning, God created the heavens and the earth, the earth being formless... God said, "Let there be light!")

Though the first option is the traditional view, Rabbinical commentators and experts in Hebrew have suggested since the Middle Ages that it cannot be preferred over the second or third option based on purely linguistic and exegetical grounds. Whereas our modern societies see the origin of matter as a question of crucial importance, this may not have been the case for ancient cultures. Some scholars assert that the authors of Genesis could have been more concerned with another form of creation, such as God giving form and role to an purposeless and inoperative abyss, resembling other Ancient Near Eastern creation stories and mythological frameworks.

== Creatio ex nihilo in religion ==
Creatio ex nihilo is the doctrine that all matter was created out of nothing by God in an initializing act whereby the cosmos came into existence. The third-century founder of Neoplatonism, Plotinus, argued that the cosmos was instead an emanation of God. Emanationism was rejected by Jewish philosophers, as well as the Church Fathers and Muslim philosophers who followed.

=== African traditional religions ===
African traditional religions tend to favour creatio ex materia over creatio ex nihilo, and it is absent in Akan, Acholi, and Yoruba religions. Ghanaian philosopher Kwasi Wiredu has argued that some religions such as those of the Shona, Nuer, and Banyarwanda "affirm the notion of creatio ex nihilo".

=== Ancient Near East ===
Although ancient Near Eastern cosmology is read as invoking a process of creatio ex materia, occasional suggestions have been made that creatio ex nihilo can be found at least in some texts, including the Egyptian Memphite theology and the Hebrew Biblical Genesis creation narrative. Hilber rejected these interpretations, viewing both as consistent with creatio ex materia and instead suggesting that some passages in the Book of Isaiah, the Book of Proverbs, and the Psalms indicate a form of creatio ex nihilo. The cosmogonical doxologies of the Book of Amos also present a view of creation ex nihilo.

=== Bakongo spirituality ===
In Bakongo religion, the Bakongo people believe that "the world in its beginning was empty; it was an mbûngi, an empty thing, a cavity, without visible life." Mbûngi (also called mwasi and mpampa) was symbolized as a circle of emptiness. The creator god Nzambi, along with his female counterpart called Nzambici, is believed to have created a spark of fire, called kalûnga, and summoned it inside of mbûngi. Kalûnga grew and became a great force of energy inside of mbûngi, creating a mass of fusion. When the mass grew too hot, the heated force caused the mass to break apart and hurl projectiles outside of mbûngi. Those projectiles became individual masses that scattered about, and when the fires cooled, planets formed and life came to be. The Bakongo believe this was the process Nzambi used to create the universe, with the sun, stars, planets, etc. The Bakongo referred to this process as luku lwalamba Nzambi, or "God created and cooked dough." Because of this, kalûnga is seen as the origin of life, or moyo wawo mu nza, and the Bakongo believe that life requires constant change and perpetual motion. Thus, Nzambi is also referred to as Kalûnga, the god of change. Similarities between the Bakongo belief of kalûnga and the Big Bang Theory have been studied. Unlike many other traditional African spiritualities, the creation beliefs of the Bakongo are compatible with creatio ex nihilio.

=== Christianity ===
Nicene Christian theologies hold to creation ex nihilo. The doctrine has been defended in Christian circles since early in the religion's development, receiving its first explicit articulation in the late 2nd Century by Theophilus of Antioch in To Autolycus. In a chapter entitled "Absurd Opinions of the Philosophers Concerning God", he writes:

As, therefore, in all these respects God is more powerful than man, so also in this; that out of things that are not He creates and has created things that are.

Theophilus's statement is nearly identical to epistle to the Romans 4:17:

God...who quickeneth the dead; and calleth those things that are not, as those that are.

Thus, there is evidence that creation ex nihilo was being discussed in at least some Christian theological circles by the 3rd century. In late antiquity, John Philoponus was its most prominent defender.

Some theologians have proposed alternatives to creatio ex nihilo, like the idea of God creating the universe from Godself (ex ipse), which suggests the universe is similar to God. Others argue for creation from pre-existent matter (ex materia), implying the world does not rely on God for existence. The notion of creatio ex nihilo underlies some modern arguments for the existence of God among Christian and other theistic philosophers, especially as articulated in the cosmological argument, as well as its more particular manifestation in the Kalam cosmological argument.

Augustine of Hippo affirmed an allegorical interpretation of the six-day account of creation in the book of Genesis. He argues that the number 7 is significant and serves as a symbol of the perfection of God's creative work. He suggests that the first three days of creation cannot be considered perfect because the Sun was created on the fourth day. Additionally, he notes that the night of the sixth day is not mentioned in the biblical account. Augustine further contends that the notion of God resting on the seventh day is questionable, as God is characterized as possessing all forms of wealth and is eternally unchangeable; thus, a change in state between the sixth and seventh days is deemed illogical. He emphasizes the concept of divine immutability and asserts that nothing can be added to the divine essence at any point—in relation to the unity of the Triune God worshipped in Nicene Christianity—while recognizing the distinct persons within the Trinity.

According to Ambrose of Milan, God's rest follows the creation of humankind because God rests in the human being, which allows for a relationship of love to be established. In this context, God's rest is understood as a realization of love for his creatures, which is further connected to the concept of redemption in Christian theology. Ambrose distinguishes a link between the 'rest of God' and the 'rest' of Jesus on the cross.

==== The Church of Jesus Christ of Latter-day Saints ====
Adherents of the Church of Jesus Christ of Latter-day Saints do not believe, as Nicene Christians do, that God created the universe ex nihilo. Rather, to Latter-day Saints, God's act of creation is essentially an organization of pre-existing matter, or creatio ex materia.

=== Hinduism ===
The Chandogya Upanishad 6:2:1 declares that before the world was manifested, there was only "existence" itself, one and unparalleled (sat eva ekam eva advitīyam). Swami Lokeshwarananda commented on this passage, saying, "something out of nothing is an absurd idea".

=== Islam ===
Most scholars of Islam, like Judaism and Christianity, hold the belief that God is the unmoved mover and creator; he did not create the world from pre-existing matter.

=== Judaism ===
One of the earliest recorded articulations of the concept of creatio ex nihilo is in the non-canonical Jewish text 2 Maccabees. In 2 Maccabees 7:28, the author writes:

I implore you, my child, observe heaven and earth, consider all that is in them, and acknowledge that God made them out of what did not exist, and that mankind comes into being the same way.

Some have argued against interpreting 2 Maccabees this way, and none of the books of Maccabees are included in the Jewish canon.

In the first century CE, Philo of Alexandria, a Hellenized Jew, laid out the basic idea of ex nihilo creation, albeit inconsistently. Philo rejected the Greek notion of an eternal universe, maintaining that God created time itself. In other places, it has been argued that he postulated pre-existent matter alongside God. Later scholars, such as Harry Austryn Wolfson, interpreted Philo's cosmology differently, arguing that the so-called pre-existent matter was indeed created.

Saadia Gaon, a late 9th- and 10th-century Middle Egyptian-Palestinian rabbi, gaon, philosopher, and exegete, formally introduced ex nihilo creation into Jewish Tanakh interpretation with the Book of Beliefs and Opinions, the first systematic theology of Rabbinic Judaism. Today, religious Judaism asserts creation ex nihilo, although some Jewish scholars maintain that Genesis 1:1 allows for the pre-existence of matter to which God gives form.

==== Hasidism and Kabbalah ====
Jewish philosophers of the 9th and 10th centuries adopted the concept of "yesh me-Ayin" (something from nothing), contradicting Greek philosophers and the Aristotelian stance that the world was created out of primordial matter and/or was eternal.

=== Stoicism ===
Stoicism, founded by Zeno of Citium c. 300 BCE, holds the belief that creation out of nothing is impossible and that Zeus created the world out of his own being.

== In modern science ==
The Big Bang theory, in contrast to theology, is a scientific theory; it offers no explanation of cosmic existence but only a description of the first few moments of the existence of the current universe.

== See also ==
- Emergence – Unpredictable phenomenon in complex systems
- Emergent Universe – Cosmological models
- Infinite regress – Philosophical problem
- Language isolate – Language that has no demonstrable genetic relationship with other languages
- List of Latin phrases
- Estonian vocabulary § Ex nihilo lexical enrichment
- Mormon cosmology: Mormon metaphysics – View of the universe and nature of divinity in the Latter Day Saint movement
- Natural theology – Theology reliant on rational and empirical arguments
- No such thing as a free lunch – Adage of the impossibility of getting something for nothing
- Problem of the creator of God – Philosophical problem
- Turtles all the way down – Statement of infinite regress
- Why is there anything at all? – Metaphysical question
