= Why is there anything at all? =

Metaphysical question

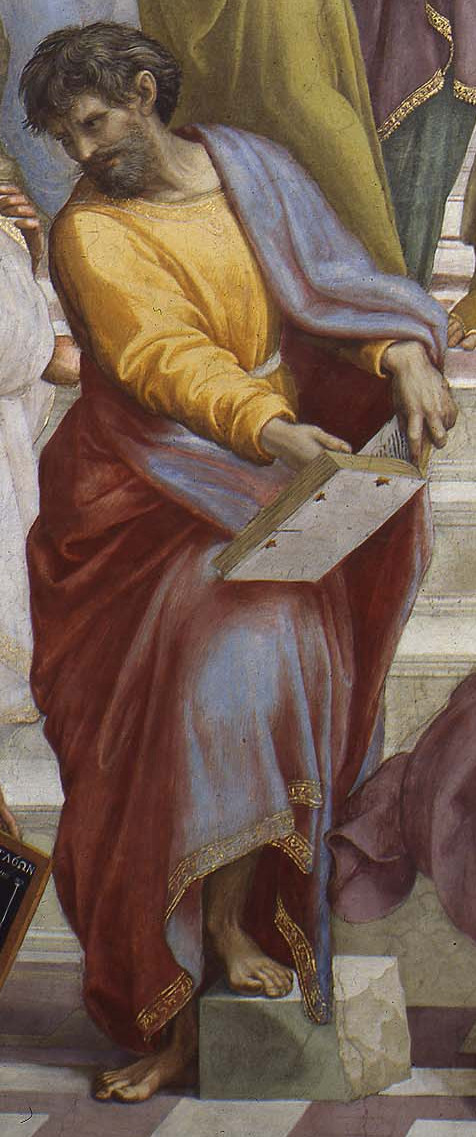
This question has been written about by philosophers since at least the ancient Parmenides (c. 515 BC).

"Why is there anything at all?" or "Why is there something rather than nothing?" is a question about the reason or explanation for basic existence which has been raised or commented on by a range of philosophers and physicists, including Gottfried Wilhelm Leibniz, Ludwig Wittgenstein, and Martin Heidegger, who called it "the fundamental question of metaphysics".

== Introductory points ==
The circled dot was used by the Pythagoreans and later Greeks to represent the first metaphysical being and the metaphysical life, the Monad or the Absolute.

=== There is something ===
No experiment could support the hypothesis "There is nothing" because any observation implies the existence of an observer.

=== Defining the question ===
The question is usually taken as concerning practical causality (rather than a moral reason for), and posed totally and comprehensively, rather than concerning the existence of anything specific, such as the universe or multiverse, the Big Bang, God, mathematical and physical laws, time or consciousness. It can be seen as an open metaphysical question, rather than a search for an exact answer.

=== On timescales ===
The question does not include the timing of when anything came to exist.

Some have suggested the possibility of an infinite regress, where, if an entity cannot come from nothing and this concept is mutually exclusive from something, there must have always been something that caused the previous effect, with this causal chain (either deterministic or probabilistic) extending infinitely back in time.

== Arguments against attempting to answer the question ==
=== The question is outside our experience ===
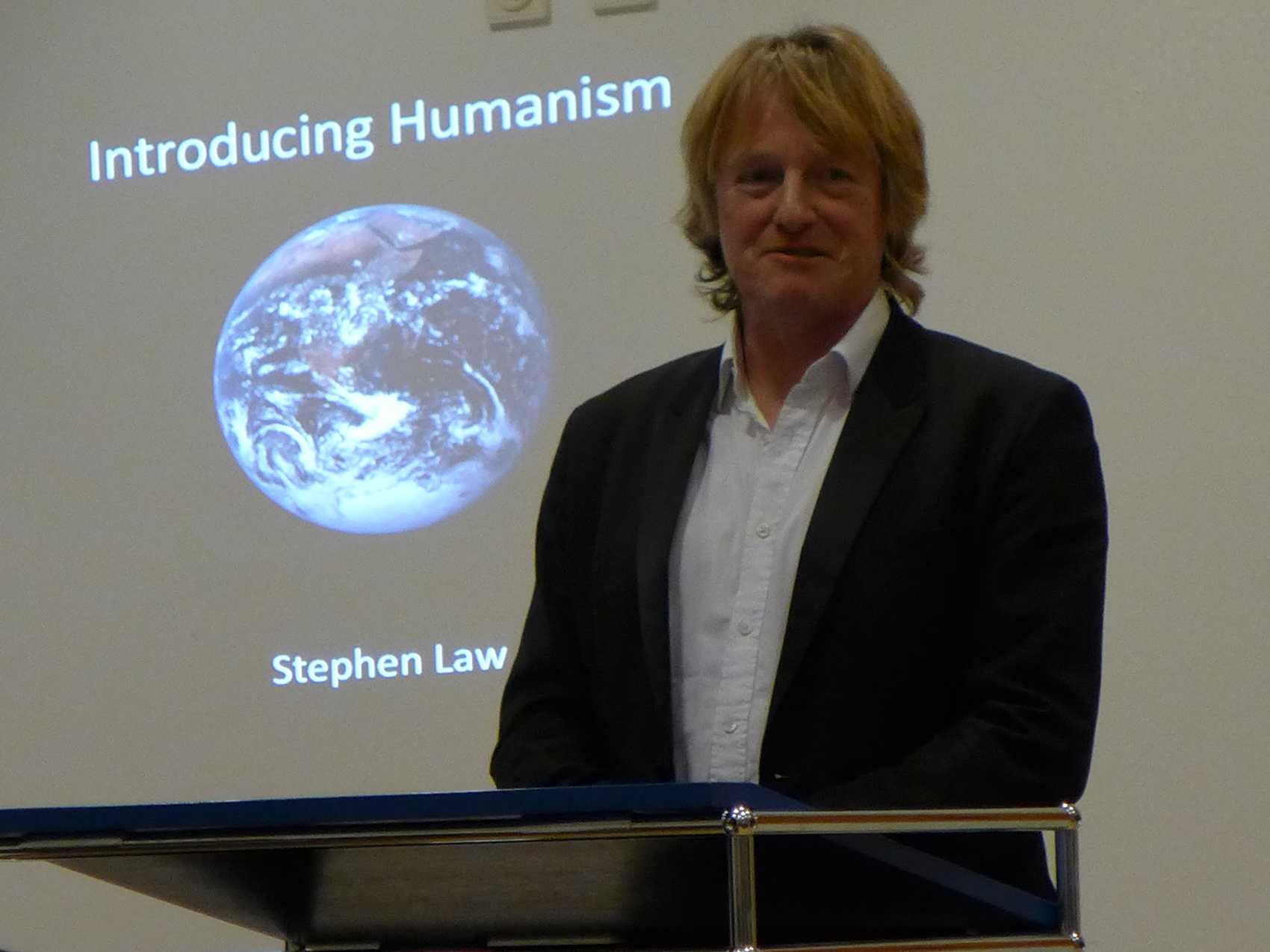
Stephen Law compared the question to asking "what is north of the North Pole?"

Philosopher Stephen Law has said the question may not need answering, as it is attempting to answer a question that is outside a spacetime setting while being within a spacetime setting. He compares the question to asking "what is north of the North Pole?"

=== Causation may not apply ===
The ancient Greek philosopher Aristotle argued that everything in the universe must have a cause, culminating in an ultimate uncaused cause. (See Four causes.)

However, David Hume argued that a cause may not be necessary in the case of the formation of the universe. Whilst we expect that everything has a cause because of our experience for the necessity of causation, the formation of the universe is outside our experience and may be subject to different rules. Kant supported and extended Hume's argument.

=== We may only say the question because of the nature of our minds ===
Kant argues that the nature of our mind may lead us to ask some questions (rather than asking because of the validity of those questions).

=== The brute fact approach ===
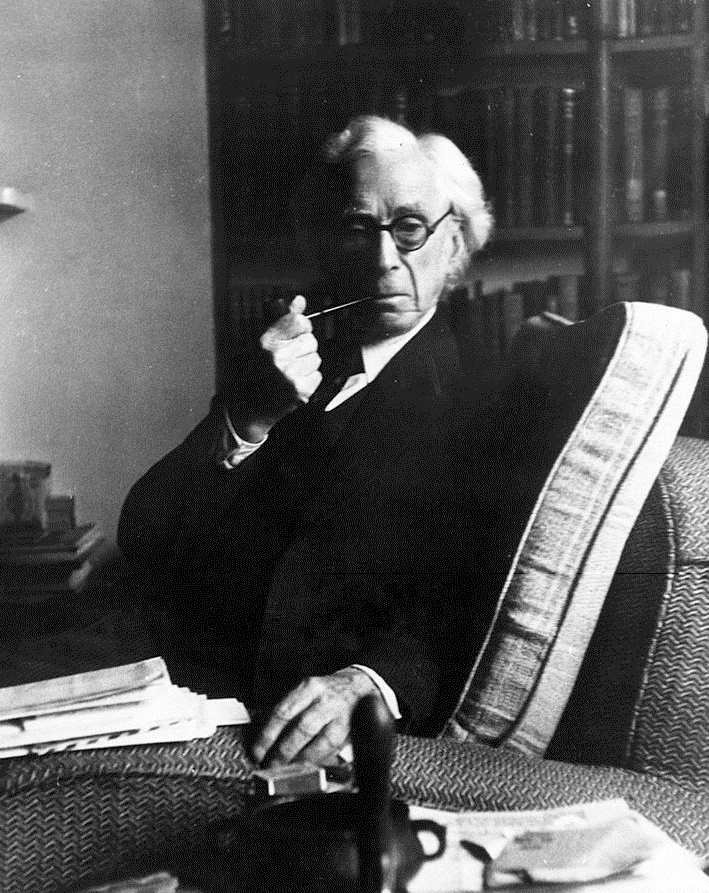
Bertrand Russell took the stance that existence was simply a brute fact.

In philosophy, the brute fact approach proposes that some facts cannot be explained in terms of a deeper, more "fundamental" fact. It is in opposition to the principle of sufficient reason approach.

On this question, Bertrand Russell took a brute fact position when he said, "I should say that the universe is just there, and that's all." Sean Carroll similarly concluded that "any attempt to account for the existence of something rather than nothing must ultimately bottom out in a set of brute facts; the universe simply is, without ultimate cause or explanation."

=== The question may be impossible to answer ===
Roy Sorensen has discussed that the question may have an impossible explanatory demand, if there are no existential premises.

== Explanations ==
=== Something may exist necessarily ===
Philosopher Brian Leftow has argued that the question cannot have a causal explanation (as any cause must itself have a cause) or a contingent explanation (as the factors giving the contingency must pre-exist), and that if there is an answer, it must be something that exists necessarily (i.e., something that just exists, rather than is caused).

==== Natural laws may necessarily exist, and may enable the emergence of matter ====
Philosopher of physics Dean Rickles has argued that numbers and mathematics (or their underlying laws) may necessarily exist. If we accept that mathematics is an extension of logic, as philosophers such as Bertrand Russell and Alfred North Whitehead did, then mathematical structures like numbers and shapes must be necessarily true propositions in all possible worlds.

Physicists, including popular physicists such as Stephen Hawking and Lawrence Krauss, have offered explanations (of at least the first particle coming into existence aspect of cosmogony) that rely on quantum mechanics, saying that in a quantum vacuum state, virtual particles and spacetime bubbles will spontaneously come into existence. The actual mathematical demonstration of quantum fluctuations of the hypothetical false vacuum state spontaneously causing an expanding bubble of true vacuum was done by quantum cosmologists in 2014 at the Chinese Academy of Sciences. Although some, like Edward Feser, argue that this doesn't answer the question of being.

==== A necessary being bearing the reason for its existence within itself ====
Gottfried Wilhelm Leibniz attributed to God as being the necessary sufficient reason for everything that exists (see: Cosmological argument). He wrote:

"Why is there something rather than nothing? The sufficient reason... is found in a substance which... is a necessary being bearing the reason for its existence within itself."

=== A state of nothing may be impossible ===
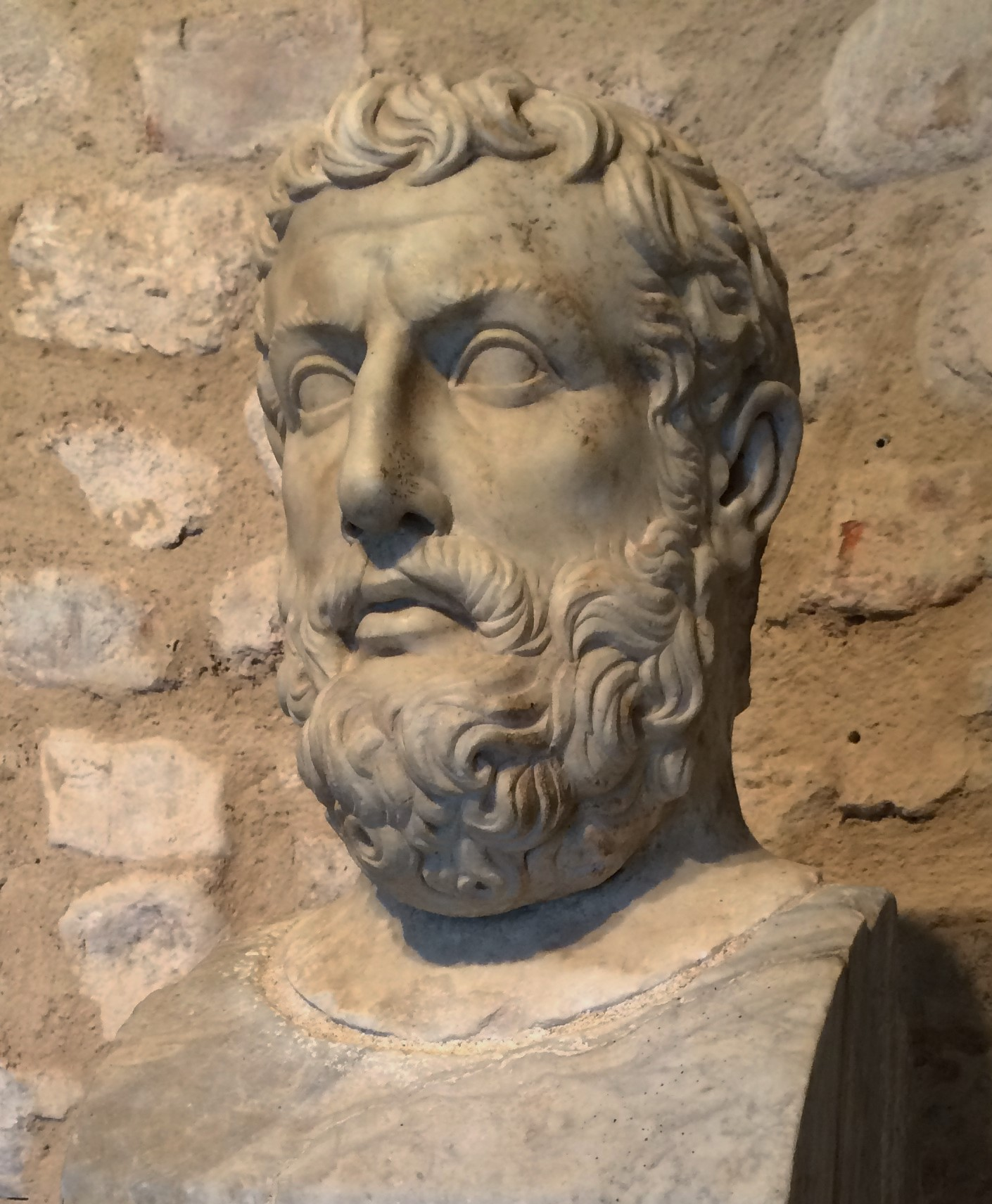
Parmenides questioned whether it was possible for there to be nothing.

The pre-Socratic philosopher Parmenides was one of the first Western thinkers to question the possibility of nothing, and commentary on this has continued.

=== A state of nothing may be unstable ===
Nobel Laureate Frank Wilczek is credited with the aphorism that "nothing is unstable." Physicist Sean Carroll argues that this accounts merely for the existence of matter, but not the existence of quantum states, space-time, or the universe as a whole.

=== It is possible for something to come from nothing ===
Some cosmologists believe it to be possible that something (e.g., the universe) may come to exist spontaneously from nothing. Some mathematical models support this idea, and it has been a more prevalent explanation among the scientific community for why the Big Bang occurred.

=== Other explanations ===
Robert Nozick proposed some possible explanations.

1. Self-Subsumption: "a law that applies to itself, and hence explains its own truth."
2. The Nothingness Force: "the nothingness force acts on itself, it sucks nothingness into nothingness and produces something..."

Mariusz Stanowski explained: "There must be both something and nothing, because separately neither can be distinguished".

== Humour ==
Philosophical wit Sidney Morgenbesser answered the question with an apothegm: "If there were nothing, you'd still be complaining!", or "Even if there was nothing, you still wouldn't be satisfied!"

== See also ==
- Fine-tuned universe
- Being
- Causality
- Cosmogony
- First Cause
- Creatio ex materia
- Creatio ex nihilo
- Existence of God
- Münchhausen trilemma
- Problem of universals
- Something (concept)
- Vertiginous question
