= Cosmological argument =

Argument for the existence of God

In philosophy of religion, a cosmological argument is an argument for the existence of God based on observational statements concerning the universe and its contents, examined metaphysically through the lenses of causation or motion (change). The universe is determined to be contingent or finite in a manner that substantiates an external foundation for its existence. By referring to reason and observation alone for its premises—and precluding revelation—this category of argument falls within the domain of natural theology. A cosmological argument can also be referred to as an argument from universal causation, a First Cause argument or prime mover argument.

The concept of causation, or causal principle, is a fundamental pillar of most cosmological arguments, especially in affirming the necessity for a First Cause. The latter is identified by philosophical analysis to be God as determined within classical or other specific conceptions of theism. Some formulations of the argument classify the universe as contingent in the metaphysical sense that it has the potential to not exist and lacks a reason for its existence within itself. Other variations expound its finitude in the impossibility of an infinite regress of causal interactions, kinetic interactions between objects in motion or past events, to specify the existence of a First Cause or an unmoved mover.

The origins of the argument date back at least to Aristotle, developed subsequently within the scholarly traditions of Neoplatonism and early Christianity, then under medieval Islamic scholasticism through the 9th to 12th centuries. It would eventually be re-introduced to Christian theology in the 13th century by Thomas Aquinas. In the 18th century, it would become associated with the principle of sufficient reason articulated by Gottfried Leibniz and Samuel Clarke, itself an exposition of the Parmenidean causal principle that "nothing comes from nothing". Contemporary defenders of cosmological arguments include William Lane Craig, Robert Koons, John Lennox, Stephen Meyer, and Alexander Pruss.

== History ==
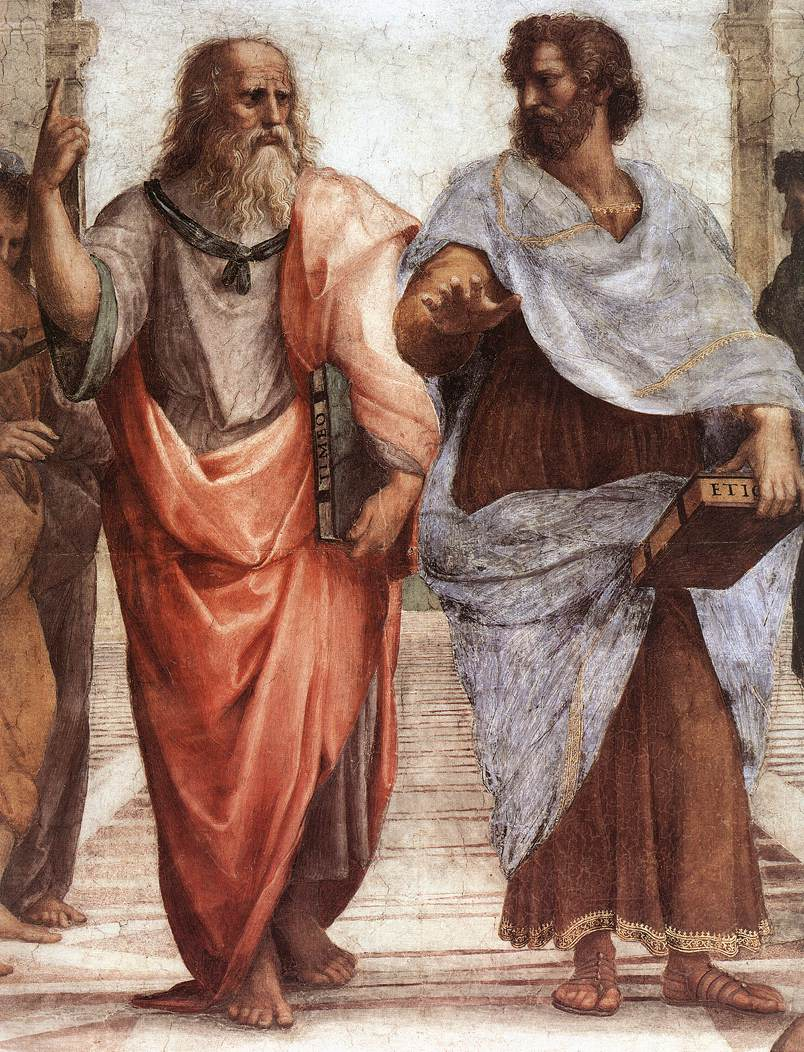
Plato and Aristotle, depicted here in Raphael's The School of Athens, both developed first cause arguments.

=== Classical philosophy ===
Plato (c. 427–347 BC) and Aristotle (c. 384–322 BC) both presented cosmological arguments, though each had notable caveats. In The Laws (Book X), Plato theorised that all movement in the world and cosmos was "imparted motion" that required a "self-originated motion" to set it in motion and to maintain it. In Timaeus, he posited a demiurge of supreme wisdom and intelligence as the creator of the cosmos.

Aristotle disputed the idea of an efficient First Cause, noting that it contradicts his doctrine of an eternal cosmos without a beginning in time. His conception of the unmoved mover describes a timeless being that sustains cosmic motion through an infinite duration, rather than an efficient cause that initiates motion from a cosmic beginning. He proposed the existence of multiple unmoved movers, each powering a celestial sphere, dwelling eternally beyond the sphere of fixed stars, subordinated to a Prime Mover (πρῶτον κινοῦν ἀκίνητον or primus motor) that serves as the ultimate source for all motion. In what he called "first philosophy", or metaphysics, Aristotle intended a theological correspondence between the Prime Mover and a deity. Practically, however, he had presented an explanation for the apparent motion of the fixed stars.

According to Aristotle's natural theology, his pantheon of eternal beings did not create the world, nor do they act on whims. He illustrated the unmoved movers as timeless, immutable beings of pure actuality and thought. Being immaterial, they are incapable of interacting with the cosmos and have no knowledge of what transpires therein. From an "aspiration or desire", the celestial spheres imitate this perfection by moving in the most perfect way possible, in a uniform circular motion. The unmoved movers are no different in kind from the Prime Mover, yet subordinated to it via a dependency of relation.

=== Late antiquity to the Islamic Golden Age ===
Plotinus, a third-century Platonist, taught that the One transcendent absolute caused the universe to exist simply as a consequence of its existence (creatio ex deo). His disciple Proclus stated, "The One is God". In the 6th century, Syriac Christian neo-Platonist John Philoponus (c. 490 – c. 570) examined the contradiction between Greek pagan conceptions of past eternity and Aristotle's rejection of the existence of actual infinities. He categorised arguments for the finitude of the past, which underpinned his arguments for the existence of God. Philoponus's ideas would later receive further articulation among Muslim and Jewish exponents of kalam, or medieval Islamic scholasticism.

In the 11th century, Islamic philosopher Avicenna (c. 980 – 1037) inquired into the question of being, in which he distinguished between essence (māhiyya) and existence (wuǧūd). He argued that the fact of existence could not be inferred from or accounted for by the essence of existing things, and that form and matter by themselves could not originate and interact with the movement of the universe or the progressive actualization of existing things. Thus, he reasoned that existence must be due to an agent cause that necessitates, imparts, gives, or adds existence to an essence. To do so, the cause must coexist with its effect and be an existing thing.

=== Medieval Christian theology ===
Thomas Aquinas (c. 1225 – 1274) adapted and enhanced the argument he found in his reading of Aristotle, Avicenna (the Proof of the Truthful) and Maimonides to formulate one of the most influential versions of the cosmological argument. His conception of the first cause was the idea that the universe must be caused by something that is itself uncaused, which he claimed is 'that which we call God':

The second way is from the nature of the efficient cause. In the world of sense we find there is an order of efficient causes. There is no case known (neither is it, indeed, possible) in which a thing is found to be the efficient cause of itself; for so it would be prior to itself, which is impossible. Now in efficient causes it is not possible to go on to infinity, because in all efficient causes following in order, the first is the cause of the intermediate cause, and the intermediate is the cause of the ultimate cause, whether the intermediate cause be several, or only one. Now to take away the cause is to take away the effect. Therefore, if there be no first cause among efficient causes, there will be no ultimate, nor any intermediate cause. But if in efficient causes it is possible to go on to infinity, there will be no first efficient cause, neither will there be an ultimate effect, nor any intermediate efficient causes; all of which is plainly false. Therefore it is necessary to admit a first efficient cause, to which everyone gives the name of God.

Notably, Aquinas's Five Ways, given the second question of his Summa Theologica, are not the entirety of Aquinas's demonstration that the Christian God exists. The Five Ways form only the beginning of Aquinas's Treatise on the Divine Nature.

== General principles ==
=== The infinite regress ===
A regress is a series of related elements, arranged in some type of sequence of succession, examined in backwards succession (regression) from a fixed point of reference. Depending on the type of regress, this retrograde examination may take the form of recursive analysis, in which the elements in a series are studied as products of prior, often simpler, elements. If there is no 'last member' in a regress (i.e. no 'first member' in the series) it becomes an infinite regress, continuing in perpetuity. In the context of the cosmological argument the term 'regress' usually refers to causal regress, in which the series is a chain of cause and effect, with each element in the series arising from causal activity of the prior member. Some variants of the argument may also refer to temporal regress, wherein the elements are past events (discrete units of time) arranged in a temporal sequence.

An infinite regress argument attempts to establish the falsity of a proposition by showing that it entails an infinite regress that is vicious. The cosmological argument is a type of positive infinite regress argument given that it defends a proposition (in this case, the existence of a first cause) by arguing that its negation would lead to a vicious regress. An infinite regress may be vicious due to various reasons:

- Impossibility: Thought experiments such as Hilbert's Hotel are cited to demonstrate the metaphysical impossibility of actual infinities existing in reality. Correspondingly, it may be argued that an infinite causal or temporal regress cannot occur in the real world.
- Implausibility: The regress contradicts empirical evidence (e.g. for the finitude of the past) or basic principles such as Occam's razor.
- Explanatory failure: A failure of explanatory goals resulting in an infinite regress of explanations. This may arise in the case of logical fallacies such as begging the question or when investigating causes concerning ultimate origins or fundamental principles.

=== Accidental and essential ordering of causes ===
Aquinas refers to the distinction found in Aristotle's Physics (8.5) that a series of causes may either be accidental or essential, though the designation of this terminology would follow later under John Duns Scotus at the turn of the 14th century.

In an accidentally ordered series of causes, earlier members need not continue exerting causal activity (having done so to propagate the chain) for the series to continue. For example, in a generational line, ancestors need no longer exist for their offspring to continue the sequence of descent. In an essential series, prior members must maintain causal interrelationship for the series to continue: If a hand grips a stick that moves a rock along the ground, the rock would stop motion once the hand or stick ceases to exist.

Based upon this distinction Frederick Copleston (1907–1994) characterises two types of causation: Causes in fieri, which cause an effect's becoming, or coming into existence, and causes in esse, which causally sustain an effect, in being, once it exists.

Two specific properties of an essentially ordered series have significance in the context of the cosmological argument:

- A first cause is essential: Later members exercise no independent causal power in continuing the series. In the example illustrated above, the rock derives its causal power essentially from the stick, which derives its causal power essentially from the hand.
- All members in the causal series must exist simultaneously in time, or timelessly.

Thomistic philosopher, R. P. Phillips comments on the characteristics of essential ordering:

"Each member of the series of causes possesses being solely by virtue of the actual present operation of a superior cause ... Life is dependent inter alia on a certain atmospheric pressure, this again on the continual operation of physical forces, whose being and operation depends on the position of the earth in the solar system, which itself must endure relatively unchanged, a state of being which can only be continuously produced by a definite—if unknown—constitution of the material universe. This constitution, however, cannot be its own cause ... We are thus irresistibly led to posit a first efficient cause which, while itself uncaused, shall impart causality to a whole series."

== Versions of the argument ==
=== Aquinas's argument from contingency ===
In the scholastic era, Aquinas formulated the "argument from contingency", following Aristotle in proposing that there must be an unmoved mover to explain the origin of the universe. Since the universe could, under different circumstances, conceivably not exist (i.e. it is contingent) its existence must have a cause. This cause cannot be embodied in another contingent thing, but something that exists by necessity, i.e. something that must exist for anything else to exist. Aquinas structures his argument as an appeal to universal causation, rendering it compatible with the conception of a beginningless universe. Even if the universe has always existed, it still owes its continuing existence to an uncaused cause, he states: "... and this we understand to be God."

The argument from contingency is formulated as the Third Way (Q2, A3) in the Summa Theologica. It may be expressed as follows:

1. There exist contingent things, for which non-existence is possible.
2. It is impossible for contingent things to always exist, so at some time they did not exist.
3. Therefore, if all things are contingent, then nothing would exist now.
4. There exists something rather than nothing.

He concludes that contingent beings are an insufficient explanation for the existence of other contingent beings. Furthermore, that a necessary being must exist, whose non-existence is impossible, to explain the origination of all contingent beings.

5. Therefore, there exists a necessary being.
6. It is possible that a necessary being has a cause of its necessity in another necessary being.
7. The derivation of necessity between beings cannot regress to infinity (being an essentially ordered causal series).
8. Therefore, there exists a being that is necessary of itself, from which all necessity derives.
9. That being is whom everyone calls God.

=== Leibnizian cosmological argument ===
In 1714, German philosopher Gottfried Leibniz presented a variation of the cosmological argument based upon the principle of sufficient reason. He writes: "There can be found no fact that is true or existent, or any true proposition, without there being a sufficient reason for its being so and not otherwise, although we cannot know these reasons in most cases." Stating his argument succinctly:

"Why is there something rather than nothing? The sufficient reason ... is found in a substance which ... is a necessary being bearing the reason for its existence within itself."

Alexander Pruss formulates the argument as follows:

1. Every contingent fact has an explanation.
2. There is a contingent fact that includes all other contingent facts.
3. Therefore, there is an explanation of this fact.
4. This explanation must involve a necessary being.
5. This necessary being is God.

Premise 1 expresses the principle of sufficient reason. Premise 2 proposes the existence of a logical conjunction of all contingent facts—representing the sum total of contingent reality—referred to in later literature as the Big Conjunctive Contingent Fact (BCCF). In premise 3, Pruss applies the principle of sufficient reason to the BCCF, given that it too, as a contingency, requires a sufficient explanation. It follows, in statement 4, that the explanation of the BCCF cannot be contingent, therefore necessary, given that the BCCF incorporates the totality of contingent facts.

Philosophers Joshua Rasmussen and T. Ryan Byerly have argued in defence of the inference from statement 4 to statement 5, which identifies as God the necessary being explaining all of contingent reality.

=== Duns Scotus's metaphysical argument ===
At the turn of the 14th century, medieval Christian theologian John Duns Scotus (1265/66–1308) formulated a metaphysical argument for the existence of God inspired by Aquinas's argument of the unmoved mover. Like other philosophers and theologians, Scotus believed that his statement for God's existence could be considered distinct to that of Aquinas. The form of the argument can be summarised as follows:

1. An effect cannot be produced by itself.
2. An effect cannot be produced by nothing.
3. A circle of causes is impossible.
4. Therefore, it is necessarily true that an effect is produced by something else.
5. An accidentally ordered causal series cannot exist without an essentially ordered series.
1. Each member in an accidentally ordered series (except a possible first) exists via causal activity of a prior member.
2. That causal activity is exercised by virtue of a certain form.
3. Therefore, that form is required by each member to effect causation.
4. The form itself is not a member of the series.
6. It is impossible for an essentially ordered causal series to regress to infinity.
7. Therefore [4,5,6], it is possible that a first agent exists.
8. Therefore [7], it is necessarily true that a first agent exists (by S5 modal logic).
1. If a first agent does not exist, then it is impossible that a first agent exists.
2. Therefore [a], if it is possible that a first agent exists, then it is necessarily true that a first agent exists (by contraposition).
3. necessarily true

Scotus reasons, in premise 5, that an accidentally ordered series of causes is impossible without higher-order laws and processes that govern the basic principles of accidental causation, which he characterises as essentially ordered causes. Premise 6 continues, in accordance with Aquinas's discourses on the Second Way and Third Way, that an essentially ordered series of causes cannot be an infinite regress.

Statement 7 evolves this framework to declare that it is possible for a being to exist that is causeless by virtue of ontological perfection. Scotus pronounces that, if it is possible that a first agent exists, then it is necessarily true that a first agent exists, given that the non-existence of a first agent entails the impossibility of its own existence (by virtue of being a first cause in the causal chain).

With the formulation of this argument, Scotus establishes the first component of his 'triple primacy': The characterisation of a being that is first in efficient causality, final causality and pre-eminence, or maximal excellence, which he ascribes to God.

=== Kalam cosmological argument ===
The Kalam cosmological argument's central thesis is the impossibility of an infinite temporal regress of events (or past-infinite universe). Though a modern formulation that defends the finitude of the past through philosophical and scientific arguments, many of the argument's ideas originate in the writings of early Christian theologian John Philoponus (490–570 AD), developed within the proceedings of medieval Islamic scholasticism through the 9th to 12th centuries, eventually returning to Christian theological scholarship in the 13th century.

These ideas were revitalised for modern discourse by philosopher and theologian William Lane Craig through publications such as The Kalām Cosmological Argument (1979) and the Blackwell Companion to Natural Theology (2009). The form of the argument popularised by Craig is expressed in two parts, as an initial deductive syllogism followed by further philosophical analysis.

==== Initial syllogism ====
1. Premise 1: Everything that begins to exist has a cause.
2. Premise 2: The universe began to exist.
3. Conclusion 1: Therefore, the universe has a cause.

For scientific confirmation of premise 2, Craig refers to the Borde–Guth–Vilenkin theorem, a kinematic theorem that determines a past boundary to cosmic inflation for any universe that has, on average, been expanding through its history. He emphasises the theorem's reach, noting its independence of any physical description of the early universe—such as the presence or absence of an initial singularity—and its applicability to almost any cosmological model, including oscillating and multiverse models. He affirms the past boundary it defines as either a cosmic beginning or a border with a nonclassical spacetime that itself must have a beginning on account of its quantum instability.

For philosophical evidence, Craig cites the Hilbert’s Hotel thought experiment, to demonstrate the metaphysical impossibility of actual infinites existing in reality. Considering past events to have been instantiated in reality, he deems an infinite past to be similarly impossible.

==== Conceptual analysis of the First Cause ====
Craig argues that the cause of the universe necessarily embodies specific properties, in being:

- Uncaused, otherwise an infinite regress of causes would arise.
- Timeless (therefore changeless), spaceless, immaterial and enormously powerful, in creating spacetime and its contents ex nihilo.
- Personal, possessing non-deterministic agency, in creating the universe from a timeless state (without prior determining conditions).
- Singular, per Occam's razor, in the absence of good reasons to believe in the existence of more than one uncaused cause.

Based upon this analysis, he appends a further premise and conclusion:

4. Premise 3: If the universe has a cause, then an uncaused, personal Creator of the universe exists who sans (without) the universe is beginningless, changeless, immaterial, timeless, spaceless and enormously powerful.
5. Conclusion 2: Therefore [3,4], an uncaused, personal Creator of the universe exists, who sans the universe is beginningless, changeless, immaterial, timeless, spaceless and enormously powerful.

Craig examines the theological implications that stem from the final conclusion of the argument:

"... our whole universe was caused to exist by something beyond it and greater than it. For it is no secret that one of the most important conceptions of what theists mean by 'God' is Creator of heaven and earth."

== Criticism and discourse ==
=== "What caused the first cause?" ===
Objections to the cosmological argument may question why a first cause is unique in that it does not require any causes. Critics contend that the concept of a first cause qualifies as special pleading, or that arguing for the first cause's exemption raises the question of why there should be a first cause at all. Defenders maintain that this question is addressed by various formulations of the cosmological argument, emphasizing that none of its major iterations rests on the premise that everything requires a cause.

Andrew Loke refers to the Kalam cosmological argument, in which the causal premise ("whatever begins to exist has a cause") stipulates that only things which begin to exist require a cause. William Lane Craig asserts that—even if one posits a plurality of causes for the existence of the universe—a first uncaused cause is necessary, otherwise an infinite regress of causes would arise, which he argues is impossible. Similarly, Edward Feser proposes, in accordance with Aquinas's discourses on the Second Way, that an essentially ordered series of causes cannot regress to infinity, even if it may be theoretically possible for accidentally ordered causes to do so.

Various arguments have been presented to demonstrate the metaphysical impossibility of an actually infinite regress occurring in the real world, referring to thought experiments such as Hilbert's Hotel, the tale of Tristram Shandy, and variations.

=== "Does the universe need a cause?" ===
Craig maintains that the causal principle is predicated in the metaphysical intuition that nothing comes from nothing. If such intuitions are false, he argues it would be inexplicable why anything and everything does not randomly come into existence without a cause. Yet, not all philosophers subscribe to the view of causality as a priori in justification. David Hume contends that the principle is rooted in experience, therefore within the category of a posteriori knowledge and subject to the problem of induction.

Whereas J. L. Mackie argues that cause and effect cannot be extrapolated to the origins of the universe based upon our inductive experiences and intellectual preferences, Craig proposes that causal laws are unrestricted metaphysical truths that are "not contingent upon the properties, causal powers, and dispositions of the natural kinds of substances which happen to exist".

=== Identifying the first cause ===
Secular philosophers such as Michael Martin argue that a cosmological argument may establish the existence of a first cause, but falls short of identifying that cause as personal, or as God as defined within classical or other specific conceptions of theism.

Defenders of the argument note that most formulations, such as by Aquinas, Duns Scotus and Craig, employ conceptual analysis to establish the identity of the cause. In Aquinas's Summa Theologica, the Prima Pars (First Part) is devoted predominantly to establishing the attributes of the cause, such as uniqueness, perfection and intelligence. In Scotus's Ordinatio, his metaphysical argument is the first component of the 'triple primacy' through which he characterises the first cause as a being with the attributes of maximal excellence.

=== Timeless origin of the universe ===
In the topic of cosmic origins and the standard model of cosmology, the initial singularity of the Big Bang is postulated to be the point at which space and time, as well as all matter and energy, came into existence. J. Richard Gott and James E. Gunn assert that the question of "What was there before the Universe?" makes no sense and that the concept of before becomes meaningless when considering a timeless state. They add that questioning what occurred before the Big Bang is akin to questioning what is north of the North Pole, a position also held in the Hartle-Hawking model.

Craig refers to Kant's postulate that a cause can be simultaneous with its effect, denoting that this is true of the moment of creation when time itself came into being. He affirms that the history of 20th century cosmology belies the proposition that researchers have no strong intuition to pursue a causal explanation of the origin of time and the universe. Accordingly, physicists have sought to examine the causal origins of the Big Bang by conjecturing such scenarios as the collision of membranes. Feser also notes that versions of the cosmological argument presented by classical philosophers do not require a commitment to the Big Bang, or even to a cosmic origin.

=== The Hume-Edwards principle ===
William L. Rowe characterises the Hume-Edwards principle, referring to arguments presented by David Hume, and later Paul Edwards, in their criticisms of the cosmological argument:

"If the existence of every member of a set is explained, the existence of that set is thereby explained."

The principle stipulates that a causal series—even one that regresses to infinity—requires no explanatory causes beyond those that are members within that series. If every member of a series has a causal explanation within the sequence, the series in itself is explanatorily complete. Thus, it rejects arguments, such as by Duns Scotus, for the existence of higher-order, efficient causes that govern the basic principles of material causation. Notably, it contradicts Hume's own Dialogues Concerning Natural Religion, in which the character Demea reflects that, even if a succession of causes is infinite, the very existence of the chain still requires a cause.

=== Causal loop arguments ===
Some objections to the cosmological argument refer to the possibility of loops in the structure of cause and effect that would avoid the need for a first cause. Gott and Li refer to the curvature of spacetime and closed timelike curves as possible mechanisms by which the universe may bring about its own existence. Richard Hanley contends that causal loops are neither logically nor physically impossible, remarking: "[In timed systems] the only possibly objectionable feature that all causal loops share is that coincidence is required to explain them."

Andrew Loke argues that there is insufficient evidence to postulate a causal loop of the type that would avoid a first cause. He proposes that such a mechanism would suffer from the problem of vicious circularity, rendering it metaphysically impossible.

== See also ==
- Creatio ex nihilo
- Ex nihilo nihil fit
- Argument
- Biblical cosmology
- Chaos
- Cosmogony
- Creation myth
- Dating Creation
- Determinism
- First Principle
- First cause
- Infinitism
- Logos
- Present
- Psychology
- Quinque viae
- Semantics
- Semiotics
- Temporal finitism
- Timeline of the Big Bang
- Transtheism
- Unmoved mover
