= Anthony of the Mother of God =

Spanish Carmelite friar, philosopher and theologian (1583–1637)

Anthony of the Mother of God, OCD, (Spanish: Antonio de la Madre de Dios), (1583 – 27 November 1637), was a Spanish Discalced Carmelite friar, who was notable as a professor of philosophy and theology, who initiated the compilation.

== Career and works ==
Born Antonio Oliva y Ordás, he entered the Discalced Carmelites around 1600. After completing his studies at their seminary, then part of the University of Salamanca, in 1609 he was ordained to priesthood. Anthony then taught Aristotle's dialectics and natural philosophy at another seminary of his Order, part of the Universidad Complutense, at that time located in Alcalá de Henares.

With the collaboration of his colleagues, Anthony undertook an encyclopaedia intended for students in arts and philosophy, as a guide to the Summa Theologica of St. Thomas Aquinas. This work, of which he is credited with the authorship of two volumes, was originally called the Collegium Complutense philosophicum (Philosophical Writings of the Complutense College) was highly esteemed by Thomists.

The work was at first a treatise on logic; but in the course of time, metaphysics and moral philosophy were added, and the work served as an introduction to the Curso Dogmático Salmanticense (Theological Curriculum of Salamanca), the first three volumes of which are also attributed to Anthony.
