= Classical theism =

Form of theism

Classical theism is a theological and philosophical form of theism that conceives of God as the ultimate reality, characterized by attributes such as omnibenevolence, omnipotence, and omniscience. Rooted in the ancient Greek philosophy of Plato and Aristotle, classical theism presents God as the simple infinite act of being that is immutable, impassible, transcendent, and entirely self-sufficient. This understanding of God emphasizes divine simplicity where God's essence and existence are identical—making him fundamentally distinct from all created entities.

Throughout history, classical theism has significantly shaped the doctrines of major religious traditions, particularly within Judaism, Christianity, and Islam. In Jewish thought, philosophers like Philo and Maimonides emphasized the unity and transcendence of God, aligning closely with classical theistic principles. The early Church Fathers, like Irenaeus, Clement of Alexandria and Augustine incorporated classical theistic ideas into Christian theology, establishing a framework that was later to be refined by medieval thinkers such as Thomas Aquinas and Anselm of Canterbury. Islamic philosophers such as Avicenna and Al-Farabi adopted classical theistic concepts to articulate a vision of God as utterly singular and beyond human comprehension.

Despite its profound influence, classical theism has been criticized on theological grounds. Proponents of process theology argue that the conception of God as an unchanging being fails to capture the dynamic and evolving nature of the world. Open theists interpret the classical doctrine of omnipotence as involving force and suggest a forbearance in divine power instead. Others argue that an omnipotent, omnibenevolent God cannot properly by called unlimited

== Historical development ==
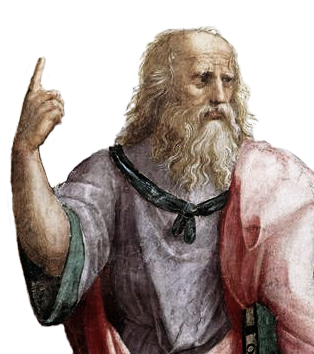
Plato laid the foundations for the development of classical theism.

Classical theism is related to ancient Greek philosophy, particularly in the works of Plato and Aristotle. Plato's concept of the Form of the Good in works like The Republic and Timaeus provided an early model of a transcendent, perfect reality that stands as the ultimate cause and source of all other forms. Aristotle further developed these ideas with his concept of the unmoved mover, as discussed in his Metaphysics. The unmoved mover is the ultimate cause of all motion in the universe, existing as a perfect, immaterial, and necessary being. These early philosophical developments laid the groundwork for the later formulation of classical theism, which would incorporate these concepts into a broader theological framework.

The influence of Neoplatonism, particularly through the works of Plotinus, was significant in shaping early Christian thought. Plotinus introduced the concept of "The One", an ineffable, transcendent source from which all reality emanates, which had a profound impact on early Christian theologians. Church Fathers such as Augustine of Hippo integrated these Neoplatonic ideas with Christian doctrine, emphasizing God's simplicity, immutability, and omnipotence. Augustine's synthesis of Christian teaching with Platonic and Neoplatonic philosophy helped establish the intellectual foundation of classical theism within the Christian tradition.

During the medieval period, classical theism was further refined by theologians such as Anselm of Canterbury and Thomas Aquinas. Anselm's ontological argument in works like Proslogion argues for God's existence as a necessary being, a concept that aligns with the classical theistic view of God as self-existent and fundamentally different from created beings. Aquinas, in his Summa Theologica, provided a comprehensive synthesis of Aristotelian philosophy with Christian theology, developing key doctrines such as divine simplicity, immutability, and eternity. Aquinas's Five Ways—five proofs for the existence of God—became central arguments in classical theistic philosophy. His work gave rise to the Thomist theological school for which God became known as Esse ipsum subsistens.

The Renaissance and Reformation periods saw continued engagement with classical theistic ideas, particularly as scholars revisited ancient texts and integrated them with contemporary religious debates. Despite the rise of scientific and philosophical challenges, classical theism remained a dominant perspective, particularly within the Catholic tradition. The work of these periods laid the groundwork for ongoing theological and philosophical discussions, ensuring the continued relevance of classical theism in both academic and religious contexts.

== Characteristics of God ==
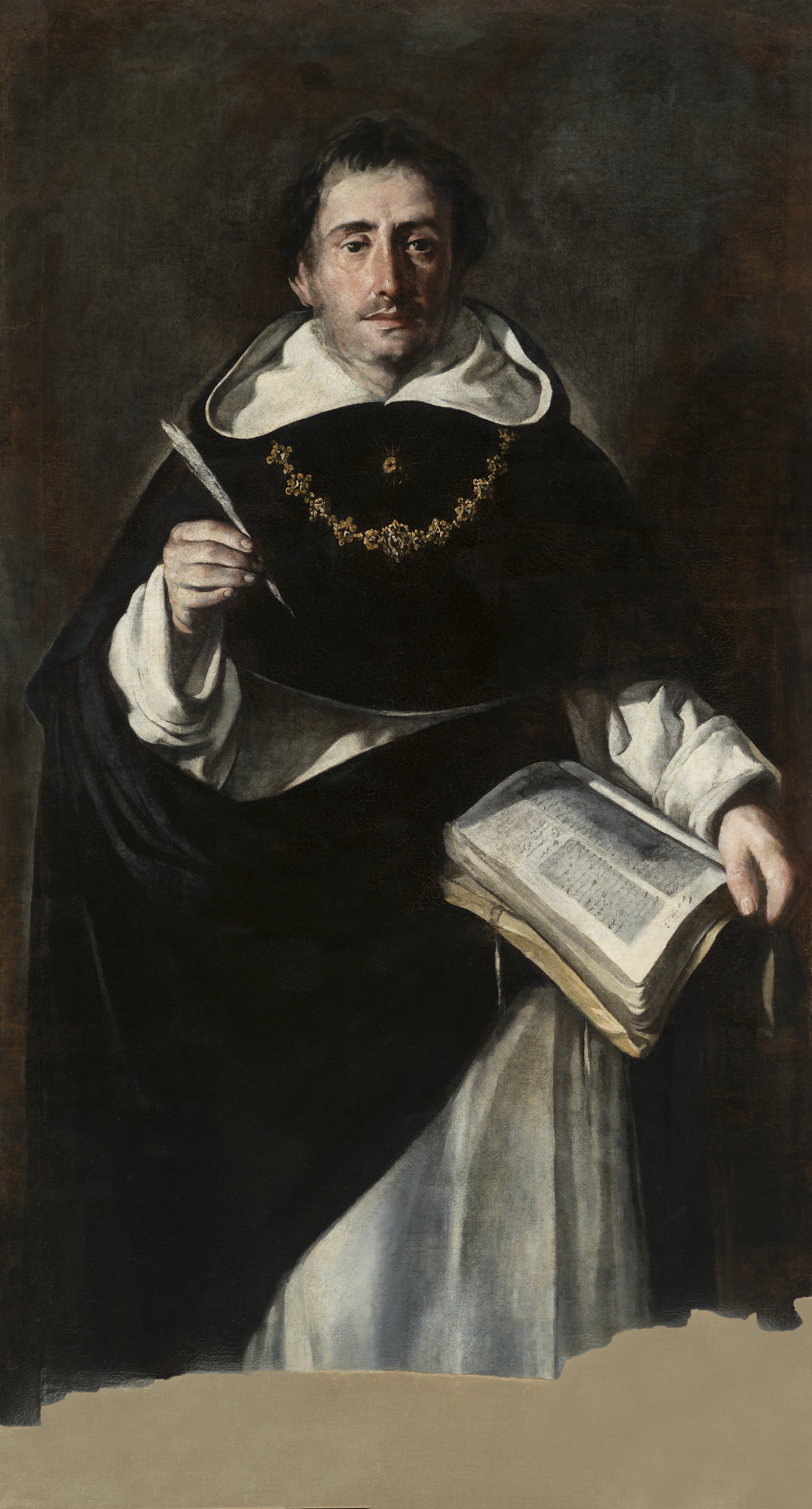
Thomas Aquinas refined the doctrine of aseity in his Summa Theologica.

Classical theism is characterized by a set of core attributes that define God as absolute, perfect, and transcendent. These attributes include aseity, divine simplicity, eternality, immutability, omnibenevolence, omnipotence, and omniscience, each of which has been developed and refined through centuries of philosophical and theological discourse.

=== Aseity ===
Aseity refers to God's self-existence and independence from anything else. God is the uncaused cause, existing by the necessity of his own nature, and does not depend on anything external for his existence. This attribute underscores God's absolute sovereignty and the idea that everything else in the universe is contingent upon him. Aseity also implies that God's will is entirely free and not constrained by anything outside of himself. This concept has been central to classical theism since the early Church Fathers and has been a key theme in the works of theologians like Augustine and Aquinas.

=== Divine simplicity ===
Divine simplicity is a foundational concept in classical theism, asserting that God is not composed of parts, whether physical or metaphysical. Unlike created beings, which are made up of various components and attributes, God's essence and existence are identical. This means that all of God's attributes—such as omnipotence, omniscience, and omnibenevolence—are not separate qualities but are unified in God's simple being. The doctrine of divine simplicity ensures that God is absolutely one, indivisible, and not subject to any form of composition or change. This concept is most famously articulated by Thomas Aquinas in the Summa Theologica.

=== Eternality ===
In classical theism, God is eternal, meaning that he exists outside of time and is not subject to temporal succession. God's eternality is often understood in two main ways: as timelessness (where God exists in an eternal "now" without before or after) or as everlastingness (where God exists through all time but is not limited by it). The timelessness view, propounded by thinkers like Boethius and Aquinas, posits that God's actions are not constrained by time, allowing him to fully know and interact with temporal events without being bound by them. This attribute emphasizes God's transcendence and his unique mode of existence compared to the created order.

=== Immutability ===
The immutability of God refers to the idea that God does not change over time or in response to anything. In classical theism, God is understood to be perfect, and any change would imply a movement away from or towards perfection, which is impossible for a being that is already absolutely perfect. This attribute is closely related to divine simplicity, as any change in God would imply that he is composed of parts that can be altered. The immutability of God is defended by classical theists as necessary for God's omniscience and omnipotence, ensuring that God is consistent and reliable in his actions and decrees.

=== Omnibenevolence ===
Omnibenevolence, or perfect goodness, is another essential attribute of God in classical theism. This attribute means that God is morally perfect, embodying the highest good and being the ultimate source of all goodness. Classical theism asserts that all of God's actions are directed toward the good and that his will is always aligned with what is morally right. God's omnibenevolence also implies that he cares for the universe that he created in a perfectly just and loving manner, providing a foundation for the moral order.

=== Omnipotence ===
Omnipotence refers to God's attribute of being all-powerful. In classical theism, this means that God can do anything that is both logically and metaphysically possible. Omnipotence is not understood as the power to do both the logically or metaphysically impossible, such as creating a square circle or making water not be H₂O, but rather the capacity to bring about any state of affairs that is both logically and metaphysically coherent. This attribute underscores God's supreme authority and ability to govern all of creation, acting according to his will without any limitations external to his nature.

=== Omniscience ===
Omniscience is the attribute of God's all-encompassing knowledge. Classical theism holds that God knows everything—past, present, and future—in a perfect and complete way. God's knowledge is not acquired through learning or observation; rather, it is inherent to his nature. This includes knowledge of all actual events, as well as all potential scenarios and outcomes. God's omniscience is closely tied to his other attributes, ensuring that his knowledge and actions are perfect and unchanging.

== In major religious traditions ==
Classical theism has profoundly influenced the theological frameworks of major religious traditions, particularly Christianity, Judaism, and Islam. Each tradition has adapted the core attributes of classical theism to fit its own doctrinal and philosophical context, resulting in a rich diversity of interpretations that nonetheless share common roots in ancient philosophical thought.

=== Christianity ===
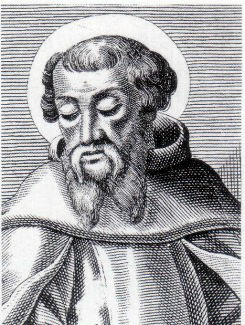
Irenaeus (c. 125–c. 202) was one of the first Christian theologians to write about classical theism within Christian theology along with Clement of Alexandria.

Classical theism has been a core belief within Christianity since it's inception. The first major Christian writers who spoke explicitly of classical theism within Christianity were Irenaeus and Clement of Alexandria. Augustine of Hippo's 4th-century autobiographical work, Confessions, contained influences of Platonism and is considered classically theist. Classical theism has always existed within Christianity, with it being further integrated into the Christian understanding of God through the work of theologians like Augustine and Thomas Aquinas.

Augustine, influenced by Neoplatonism, emphasized God's immutability, simplicity, and eternality, viewing these attributes as essential to understanding God's nature as the ultimate source of all being and goodness. Aquinas further developed these ideas, systematically incorporating them into Christian doctrine through his Summa Theologica. Aquinas's synthesis of Aristotelian philosophy with Christian theology became a cornerstone of Christian thought, particularly in Catholicism, and has continued to influence Christian theology to the present day.

In Protestant traditions, while classical theism remains influential, there has been some divergence, particularly in the emphasis on God's personal relationship with humanity and the role of divine revelation through Scripture. However, the core attributes of God, as defined in classical theism, still underpin much of Protestant theology, particularly in more traditional denominations such as Lutheranism, Anglicanism, and historically Presbyterianism.

=== Judaism ===
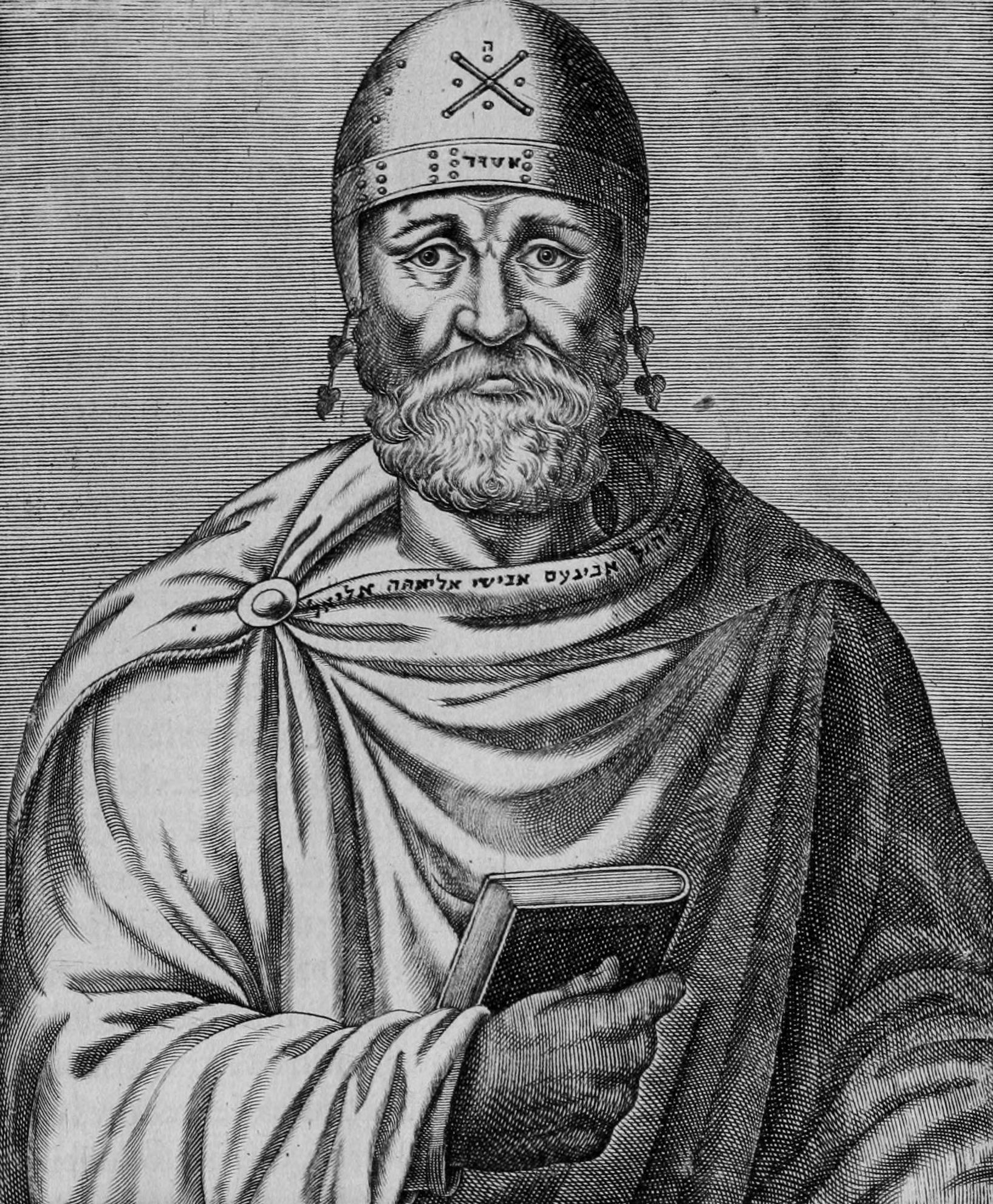
Philo of Alexandria (c. 20 BCE–c. 50 CE) introduced classical theism into Jewish theology.

Classical theism was introduced to Jewish theology before the start of Christianity by Philo of Alexandria. However, in Judaism, classical theism is most closely associated with the works of medieval Jewish philosophers such as Maimonides. In his Guide for the Perplexed, Maimonides argues for a conception of God that is fundamentally aligned with classical theistic principles, particularly divine simplicity, immutability, and omnipotence. Maimonides was deeply influenced by Aristotelian philosophy and sought to reconcile it with Jewish theology, leading to a vision of God that is transcendent, unknowable in his essence, and yet intimately involved in the governance of the universe.

Jewish classical theism emphasizes the unity and uniqueness of God, rejecting any form of division within the divine nature. This is consistent with the monotheistic foundations of Judaism, which stress the singularity and indivisibility of God. The influence of classical theism in Judaism is evident in the continued emphasis on God's absolute sovereignty and the rejection of anthropomorphic descriptions of the divine.

=== Islam ===
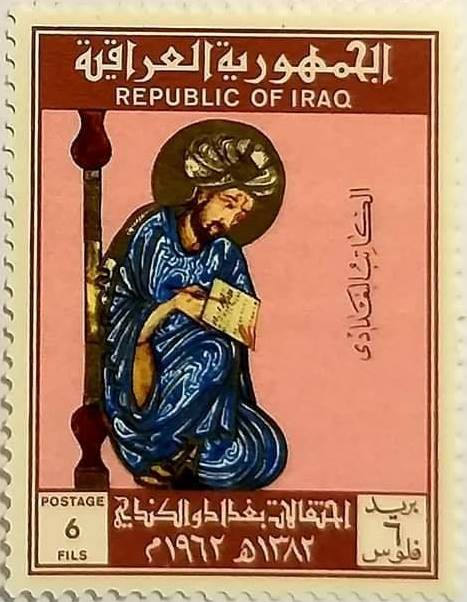
Al-Kindi (c. 801–c. 873) introduced classical theism into Islamic theology.

Islamic theology has also been shaped by classical theism, having been introduced to the Islamic tradition as early as the 9th century with al-Kindi. Avicenna's "Metaphysics" in The Book of Healing presents a conception of God as a necessary being, whose existence is identical to his essence, aligning closely with the principles of divine simplicity and aseity.

Avicenna's interpretation of God's nature had a profound influence on Islamic thought and was later integrated into the theological framework of Ash'arism, a dominant school of Islamic theology. Islamic classical theism, like its Jewish counterpart, emphasizes the absolute oneness and transcendence of God (tawḥīd), rejecting any form of multiplicity within the divine essence.

Avicenna's rationalist metaphysics, especially his distinction between essence and existence, marked a turning point in the Islamic engagement with classical theism. His formulation of God as the Necessary Existent (wājib al-wujūd) not only laid the groundwork for metaphysical arguments within Islamic philosophy but also had a lasting impact on Jewish and Christian medieval thinkers, including Maimonides and Aquinas. Yet, within Islam, this highly abstract and ontological view of the divine eventually clashed with more scripturally grounded traditions. The Ash'arite theologians, while borrowing from Avicennian metaphysics, resisted the idea that God's attributes could be reduced purely to necessity and logical deduction.

Al-Ghazali rejected classical theism, calling its followers "Islamic Aristotelians", but nonetheless upheld many classical theistic attributes in his understanding of God, particularly God's omnipotence and immutability. Classical theism within Islam was harmed by the reaction of Islamic orthodoxy. Despite his critique of the philosophers, al-Ghazali did not entirely abandon their terminology or their emphasis on divine transcendence. Instead, he reframed classical theistic ideas within a more epistemologically cautious and scripturally faithful framework. His contention in The Incoherence of the Philosophers was not with the transcendental conception of God per se, but with what he saw as the overreach of human reason in speculative metaphysics. Al-Ghazali's theological synthesis helped preserve certain classical theistic notions—particularly those relating to divine unity, will, and power—within the boundaries of orthodox Sunni thought, even as it rejected the rationalist foundations upon which they were initially built.

=== Hinduism ===
Several Hindu schools articulate a perfect and personal Supreme Being in ways that intersect with the attribute profile associated with classical theism (aseity, simplicity, immutability).

Within theistic Vedānta, Rāmānuja's Viśiṣṭādvaita identifies Viṣṇu with Para Brahman—explicitly personal and the Supreme Self (Paramātman)—and attributes omniscience, omnipotence, and omnibenovelence. Comparative work highlights strong affinities with Thomas Aquinas—especially perfect-being theism and a robust creator–creation asymmetry—alongside Rāmānuja’s softer stance on divine simplicity than in Thomistic classical theism.

By contrast, Dvaita stresses divine transcendence and sovereignty in ways close to classical theism, while Advaita treats nirguṇa Brahman as impersonal, diverging from a classical personal-God model. Beyond Vedānta, Nyāya–Vaiśeṣika developed rational proofs for an omniscient creator, paralleling classical-theist arguments.

== Arguments for classical theism ==
In the understanding of classical theism, God is conceived as the timeless absolute source and unconditional condition of all existence. The expression ho ou kinoúmenon kineî ("He who moves without being moved") used by Aristotle characterizes God in the classical theistic context, with the proposal that the movement of the entire universe depends on God. Since, within the classical theistic context, God is not only the source of all material entities but of existence overall, it is the singular being that is also the source of consciousness, personality, and self; it is itself conscious, self, and the absolute self.

=== The allegory of cup and integrity ===
The existence of a cup as a whole depends on the existence of the molecules that make up the said cup as a whole, and the existence of molecules as a whole depends on the integrity of the atoms that make up those molecules. In this context, no sum of existence can exist as a whole on its own, except for an absolute source, which is the ultimate condition of integrity, because the holistic existence of each is conditioned by a higher source that integrates itself.

It is necessary for there to be a source that is whole to itself and transmits existence to all other wholes; as all of the whole entities except the sourceless source or causeless cause are not the cause of wholeness. Therefore, only an ultimate source that is whole to itself can be responsible for the existence of the state of wholeness. This source must have absolute singularity because if it did not have simplicity and singularity, it could not have been the source of wholeness since it itself would have been the whole of different entities.

All of the higher conditions are the timeless source and condition of the lower conditions, for the integrity of the cup depends on the integrity of the molecules at every moment, and the cup cannot exist even for a second without the integrity of the molecules. In the context of a hierarchy that is independent of time, even if the being is beginningless, it would not have affected whether this existence has conditions and sources, as even if the cup is beginningless, it would have been based on the integrity of the molecules since eternity.

== Criticisms of classical theism ==
=== Theological critiques ===
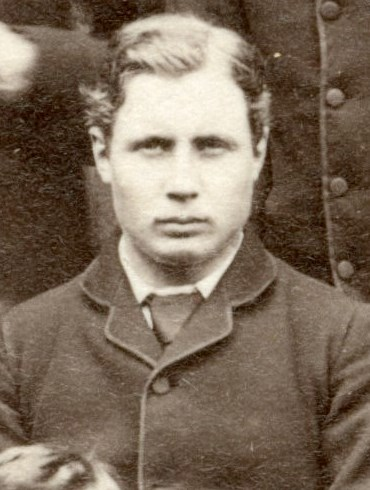
Alfred North Whitehead was one of the founders of process theology, which contrasts with classical theology.

Process theology, influenced by the philosophy of Alfred North Whitehead, rejects the classical theistic view of God as immutable and impassible. Instead, it posits a God who is in dynamic relationship with the world, changing and growing in response to the actions of creatures. Process theologians argue that this model is more consistent with the biblical portrayal of a God who interacts with creation in a meaningful way.

Open theism challenges the classical view of God's omniscience, particularly in relation to future events. Open theists argue that God knows all possibilities but does not have exhaustive knowledge of future free actions, which preserves human freedom and the genuine openness of the future. This view suggests that God can change his plans based on human actions, thus maintaining a dynamic relationship with creation. Critics of classical theism argue that open theism offers a more coherent and relational understanding of God, aligning more closely with the scriptural accounts of divine interaction.

=== Modern challenges ===
In modern philosophy and theology, classical theism has faced further challenges, particularly from those who argue that its attributes are incompatible with contemporary understandings of personhood and agency. Some modern philosophers contend that the attributes of divine simplicity and immutability make it difficult to conceive of God as a personal being who can engage in meaningful relationships with human beings. These critiques often emphasize the need for a more relational and dynamic conception of God, one that can better accommodate the complexities of modern existential and moral concerns.

== Scholars ==
Classical theism has been represented by various thinkers in various belief systems. Among the most influential of these are Plato and Aristotle in Ancient Greek philosophy; Irenaeus and Clement of Alexandria in Christianity; al-Kindi and al-Farabi in Islam; and Philo and Maimonides in Judaism.

=== Contemporary treatments ===
In contemporary philosophy and theology, classical theism remains a central topic of debate. The revival of interest in metaphysics and the philosophy of religion in the 20th and 21st centuries has brought renewed attention to the classical attributes of God. Philosophers such as Alvin Plantinga and William Lane Craig have challenged the coherence of classical theism whilst drawing on aspects of it to solve common objections, such as the problem of evil without committing to the full classical paradigm.

David Bentley Hart and Edward Feser are also contemporary philosophers who advocate for classical theism. Hart's book, The Experience of God: Being, Consciousness, Bliss, offers a robust defense of classical theism, articulating a conception of God as the fullness of being itself, upon which all else depends. Similarly, Feser has extensively written on classical theism, notably in his book Five Proofs of the Existence of God, where he explores and defends the classical understanding of God as an immutable, eternal, and simple being.
