= Alexander Pruss =

Canadian philosopher and mathematician (born 1973)

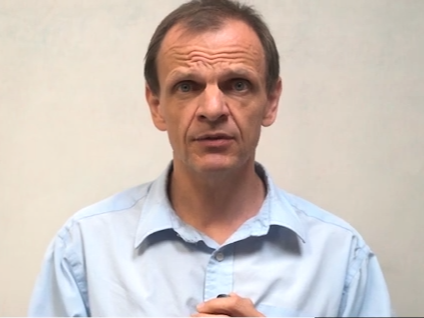
- Born: Alexander Robert Pruss; January 5, 1973 (age 53)

Education
- Education: University of Western Ontario (BSc); University of British Columbia (PhD); University of Pittsburgh (PhD)
- Theses: Possible Worlds: What They Are Good For and What They Are (2001); Symmetrization, Green’s Functions, Harmonic Measures and Difference Equations (1996)

Philosophical work
- Era: Contemporary philosophy
- Region: Western philosophy
- School: Analytic philosophy
- Institutions: Baylor University
- Main interests: Metaphysics, philosophy of religion, applied ethics
- Notable ideas: Gale–Pruss cosmological argument

Alexander Robert Pruss (/prʌs/; born January 5, 1973) is a Canadian philosopher and mathematician. He is currently a professor of philosophy and the co-director of graduate studies in philosophy at Baylor University in Waco, Texas.

His best known book is The Principle of Sufficient Reason: A Reassessment (2006). He is also the author of the books, Actuality, Possibility and Worlds (2011), and One Body: An Essay in Christian Sexual Ethics (2012), and a number of academic papers on religion and theology. He maintains his own philosophy blog and contributed to the Prosblogion philosophy of religion blog.

He is currently the Guinness World Record holder for the "greatest vertical distance climbed on a climbing wall in one hour (individual)" and the "fastest mile on climbing wall (male)."

== Biography ==
Alexander Pruss first lived in Poland, but emigrated to Canada. He went to the University of Western Ontario, studying physics and mathematics and graduating with a B.Sc. in these fields in 1991.

He earned a Ph.D. in mathematics at the University of British Columbia with a dissertation on Symmetrization, Green’s Functions, Harmonic Measures and Difference Equations, under John J. F. Fournier in 1996, and published several papers in Proceedings of the American Mathematical Society and other mathematical journals. Afterwards, he began graduate work in philosophy at the University of Pittsburgh. He completed his dissertation, Possible Worlds: What They Are and What They Are Good For, under Nicholas Rescher in 2001.

Pruss began teaching philosophy at Georgetown University in 2001, earning tenure in 2006. In 2007, he began to teach philosophy at Baylor University. He is now the director of graduate studies for the Baylor Philosophy Department. He has taught various courses, including graduate seminars on the philosophy of time, metaphysics, the cosmological and ontological arguments for the existence of God, modality, free will, and history of philosophy.

== Work ==
Pruss's philosophical thought reflects Christian orthodoxy. He is a Roman Catholic and a member of the Society of Christian Philosophers.

Pruss defends the principle of sufficient reason (PSR), claiming that it is self-evident, and arguing that the rejection of PSR creates problems in epistemology, modality, ethics, and evolutionary theory.

Pruss is a critic of David Lewis's "extreme modal realism," and instead gives "a combined account" of Leibnizian and Aristotelian modality, which integrates the "this-worldly capacities" of the Aristotelian view and Leibniz's account of possible worlds as thoughts in the mind of God.

== Bibliography ==
- The Principle of Sufficient Reason: A Reassessment. Cambridge Studies in Philosophy (Cambridge University Press, 2006)
- Actuality, Possibility and Worlds. Continuum Studies in Philosophy of Religion (Continuum, 2011)
- One Body: An Essay in Christian Sexual Ethics. Notre Dame Studies in Ethics and Culture (University of Notre Dame Press, 2012)
- Necessary Existence (with Joshua L. Rasmussen) (Oxford University Press, 2018)
- Infinity, Causation, and Paradox (Oxford University Press, 2018)

== See also ==
- Society of Christian Philosophers
- Possible worlds
