= Principle of sufficient reason =

Axiom that everything has a reason

The principle of sufficient reason (PSR) is often formulated as the claim that every contingent fact has a sufficient reason. It is sometimes interpreted as the stronger claim, that everything has a cause, for example within a deterministic system of universal causation. Necessary truths are generally regarded as not requiring a cause, since causation presupposes contingency, though they may still be said to have a sufficient reason or explanation in virtue of their necessity. Confusion may arise when using the words "reason" and "cause" interchangeably.

A sufficient reason is sometimes described as the coincidence of every single thing that is needed for the occurrence of an effect. The principle is relevant to Munchausen's trilemma, as it seems to suppose an infinite regress, rather than a foundational brute fact. The principle was articulated and made prominent by Gottfried Wilhelm Leibniz. Arthur Schopenhauer wrote On the Fourfold Root of the Principle of Sufficient Reason.

== History ==
The modern formulation of the principle is usually ascribed to the early Enlightenment philosopher Gottfried Leibniz, who formulated it, but was not its originator. The idea was conceived of and utilized by various philosophers who preceded him, including Anaximander, Parmenides, (Note: Some philosophers have associated the principle of sufficient reason with Ex nihilo nihil fit (Nothing comes from nothing).) Archimedes, Plato, Aristotle, Cicero, Avicenna, Thomas Aquinas, and Baruch Spinoza. One often pointed to is in Anselm of Canterbury: his phrase quia Deus nihil sine ratione facit (because God does nothing without reason) and the formulation of the ontological argument for the existence of God. A clearer connection is with the cosmological argument for the existence of God. The principle can be seen in both Aquinas and William of Ockham.

The post-Kantian philosopher Arthur Schopenhauer elaborated the principle, and used it as the foundation of his system, seeing it as the fourth "law of thought". William Hamilton also did so, and identified the rule of inference modus ponens with the "Law of Sufficient Reason, or of Reason and Consequent" and modus tollens with its contrapositive expression.

The principle was influential in the thinking of Leo Tolstoy, amongst others, in the elevated form that history could not be accepted as random.

In contemporary analytic philosophy, Peter Van Inwagen has questioned the principle of sufficient reason using the "big conjunctive contingent fact." Alexander Pruss defends the principle.

In the realm of epistemology, Lewis White Beck also emphasized the importance of assigning equal metaphysical importance to both the principle of sufficient reason and the principle of parsimony in the formulation of explanations within both the "social" and "physical" sciences. Simply stated,

"In the logic of science there is a principle as important as that of parsimony: it is that of sufficient reason. The former directs us to look for simplest causes, the later cautions us not to simplify so far that the explanation is inadequate to the facts to be explained.... Parsimony is not itself a simple criterion of a good methodology; we cannot simply count the factors of explanation and say that the theory containing the smallest number is the best. The ideal of parsimony cannot be expressed without the proviso that the conditions for which it is a norm shall themselves be adequate."

== Formulation ==
The principle has a variety of expressions, all of which are perhaps best summarized by the following:

- For every entity X, if X exists, then there is a sufficient explanation for why X exists.
- For every event E, if E occurs, then there is a sufficient explanation for why E occurs.
- For every proposition P, if P is true, then there is a sufficient explanation for why P is true.

$$\forall P (P \rightarrow \exist Q (Q \rightarrow P))$$

== Different views ==
=== Leibniz's view ===
Leibniz identified two kinds of truth, necessary and contingent truths. And he claimed that all truths are based upon two principles: (1) non-contradiction, and (2) sufficient reason. In the Monadology, he says,

Our reasonings are grounded upon two great principles, that of contradiction, in virtue of which we judge false that which involves a contradiction, and true that which is opposed or contradictory to the false; And that of sufficient reason, in virtue of which we hold that there can be no fact real or existing, no statement true, unless there be a sufficient reason, why it should be so and not otherwise, although these reasons usually cannot be known by us (paragraphs 31 and 32).

Necessary truths can be derived from the law of identity (and the principle of non-contradiction): "Necessary truths are those that can be demonstrated through an analysis of terms, so that in the end they become identities, just as in Algebra an equation expressing an identity ultimately results from the substitution of values [for variables]. That is, necessary truths depend upon the principle of contradiction." The sufficient reason for a necessary truth is that its negation is a contradiction.

Leibniz admitted contingent truths, that is, facts in the world that are not necessarily true, but that are nonetheless true. Even these contingent truths, according to Leibniz, can only exist on the basis of sufficient reasons. Since the sufficient reasons for contingent truths are largely unknown to humans, Leibniz made appeal to infinitary sufficient reasons, to which God uniquely has access:

In contingent truths, even though the predicate is in the subject, this can never be demonstrated, nor can a proposition ever be reduced to an equality or to an identity, but the resolution proceeds to infinity, God alone seeing, not the end of the resolution, of course, which does not exist, but the connection of the terms or the containment of the predicate in the subject, since he sees whatever is in the series.

Without this qualification, the principle can be seen as a description of a certain notion of closed system, in which there is no 'outside' to provide unexplained events with causes. It is also in tension with the paradox of Buridan's ass, because although the facts supposed in the paradox would present a counterexample to the claim that all contingent truths are determined by sufficient reasons, the key premise of the paradox must be rejected when one considers Leibniz's typical infinitary conception of the world.

In consequence of this, the case also of Buridan's ass between two meadows, impelled equally towards both of them, is a fiction that cannot occur in the universe....For the universe cannot be halved by a plane drawn through the middle of the ass, which is cut vertically through its length, so that all is equal and alike on both sides.....Neither the parts of the universe nor the viscera of the animal are alike nor are they evenly placed on both sides of this vertical plane. There will therefore always be many things in the ass and outside the ass, although they be not apparent to us, which will determine him to go on one side rather than the other. And although man is free, and the ass is not, nevertheless for the same reason it must be true that in man likewise the case of a perfect equipoise between two courses is impossible. (Theodicy, pg. 150)

Leibniz also used the principle of sufficient reason to refute the idea of absolute space:

I say then, that if space is an absolute being, there would be something for which it would be impossible there should be a sufficient reason. Which is against my axiom. And I prove it thus. Space is something absolutely uniform; and without the things placed in it, one point in space does not absolutely differ in any respect whatsoever from another point of space. Now from hence it follows, (supposing space to be something in itself, beside the order of bodies among themselves,) that 'tis impossible that there should be a reason why God, preserving the same situation of bodies among themselves, should have placed them in space after one particular manner, and not otherwise; why everything was not placed the quite contrary way, for instance, by changing East into West.

=== Hamilton's fourth law: "Infer nothing without ground or reason" ===
For Schopenhauer and Hamilton, the principle was one of the four laws of thought, a view found in the 18th and 19th centuries.

Here is how William Hamilton, circa 1837–1838, expressed his "fourth law" in his LECT. V. LOGIC. 60–61:

I now go on to the fourth law.

Par. XVII. Law of Sufficient Reason, or of Reason and Consequent:

XVII. The thinking of an object, as actually characterized by positive or by negative attributes, is not left to the caprice of Understanding – the faculty of thought; but that faculty must be necessitated to this or that determinate act of thinking by a knowledge of something different from, and independent of; the process of thinking itself. This condition of our understanding is expressed by the law, as it is called, of Sufficient Reason (principium Rationis Sufficientis); but it is more properly denominated the law of Reason and Consequent (principium Rationis et Consecutionis). That knowledge by which the mind is necessitated to affirm or posit something else, is called the logical reason ground, or antecedent; that something else which the mind is necessitated to affirm or posit, is called the logical consequent; and the relation between the reason and consequent, is called the logical connection or consequence. This law is expressed in the formula – Infer nothing without a ground or reason. (Note: See Schulze, Logik, §19, and Krug, Logik, §20, – ED.)

Relations between Reason and Consequent: The relations between Reason and Consequent, when comprehended in a pure thought, are the following:

1. When a reason is explicitly or implicitly given, then there must exist a consequent; and, vice versa, when a consequent is given, there must also exist a reason.
2. Where there is no reason there can be no consequent; and, vice versa, where there is no consequent (either implicitly or explicitly) there can be no reason. That is, the concepts of reason and of consequent, as reciprocally relative, involve and suppose each other.

The logical significance of this law: The logical significance of the law of Reason and Consequent lies in this, – That in virtue of it, thought is constituted into a series of acts all indissolubly connected; each necessarily inferring the other. Thus it is that the distinction and opposition of possible, actual and necessary matter, which has been introduced into Logic, is a doctrine wholly extraneous to this science."

=== Schopenhauer's Four Forms ===
According to Arthur Schopenhauer's On the Fourfold Root of the Principle of Sufficient Reason, there are four distinct forms of the principle.

First Form: The Principle of Sufficient Reason of Becoming (principium rationis sufficientis fiendi); appears as the law of causality in the understanding.

Second Form: The Principle of Sufficient Reason of Knowing (principium rationis sufficientis cognoscendi); asserts that if a judgment is to express a piece of knowledge, it must have a sufficient ground or reason, in which case it receives the predicate true.

Third Form: The Principle of Sufficient Reason of Being (principium rationis sufficientis essendi); the law whereby the parts of space and time determine one another as regards those relations. Example in arithmetic: Each number presupposes the preceding numbers as grounds or reasons of its being; "I can reach ten only by going through all the preceding numbers; and only by virtue of this insight into the ground of being, do I know that where there are ten, so are there eight, six, four."

"Now just as the subjective correlative to the first class of representations is the understanding, that to the second the faculty of reason, and that to the third pure sensibility, so is the subjective correlative to this fourth class found to be the inner sense, or generally self-consciousness."

Fourth Form: The Principle of Sufficient Reason of Acting (principium rationis sufficientis agendi); briefly known as the law of motivation. "Any judgment that does not follow its previously existing ground or reason" or any state that cannot be explained away as falling under the three previous headings "must be produced by an act of will which has a motive." As his proposition in 43 states, "Motivation is causality seen from within."

== See also ==
- Identity of indiscernibles
- Principle of insufficient reason
- Occam's razor
- Dependent origination
