= Jordan Howard Sobel =

Canadian-American philosopher (1929–2010)

- Born: September 22, 1929; Chicago, Illinois
- Died: March 26, 2010 (aged 80); Toronto, Ontario
- Spouse: Willa Sobel (nee Freeman)

Education
- Education: Hyde Park High School
- Alma mater: University of Illinois; University of Iowa; University of Michigan

Philosophical work
- School: Analytic philosophy
- Institutions: University of Toronto
- Main interests: Philosophy of Religion; Decision Theory; Value Theory
- Notable works: Logic and Theism
- Notable ideas: Reformulated Logical and Providential Problems of Evil

Jordan Howard Sobel (22 September 1929 – 26 March 2010) was a Canadian-American philosopher specializing in ethics, logic, and decision theory. He was a professor of philosophy at the University of Toronto, Canada. In addition to his areas of specialization, Sobel made notable contributions in the fields of philosophy of religion, and value theory. Before his death, Sobel was considered by Christian apologist William Lane Craig to be the leading philosophical defender of atheism prior to Graham Oppy.

== Life ==
Born and raised in Chicago, Illinois, Sobel was a graduate of Hyde Park High School in Chicago before going on to study at the University of Illinois, where he earned a B.S. in Commerce and Law in 1951. He went on to earn an M.A. in Philosophy at the University of Iowa, followed by a doctorate in Philosophy at the University of Michigan in 1961. His dissertation, titled "What if everyone did that?" was supervised by Richard Cartwright and William Frankena.

== Teaching ==
Sobel's teaching career starting at Monteith College, Wayne State University (1960–1961), before holding positions at Princeton University (1961–1963), UCLA (1963–1969), University of Massachusetts, Amherst (1968–1969). The same year he joined the University of Toronto, where he taught for 28 years until his retirement in 1997.

Sobel has enjoyed a close relationship with the University of Uppsala, Sweden, holding two visiting professorships in 1986, 1991, 1997–1998, and then onwards until 2004. Sobel has also been a Fellow at the Swedish Collegium for Advanced Study in Uppsala. In 2003, the University of Uppsala bestowed an honorary doctorate on Sobel. He also held visiting professorships at Dalhousie University in 1988, and the University of Umeå in 1995.

== Work ==
Sobel is the author of more than 75 refereed publications in philosophy, as well as four books. His early publications focused on ethics, most notably utilitarianism, and determinism. Later in his career, his interests turned to decision theory and philosophy of religion.

== Logic and Theism ==
In 2004, Sobel published what many consider to be his magnum opus: Logic and Theism: Arguments For and Against Beliefs in God. The work is a comprehensive overview of many of the arguments on both sides within analytic philosophy of religion. Sobel utilizes symbolic logic, inductive logic, set theory and other tools within analytic philosophy to critically analyze cosmological arguments, ontological arguments, teleological arguments and other arguments for God's existence. Sobel also reformulates a new version of the logical problem of evil, and reveals tension between God's divine attributes. The work was well-received by philosophers on both sides of the debate. Atheist philosopher Graham Oppy stated that the work is the "very best book on arguments about the existence of God that has yet appeared." Catholic philosopher Robert Koons described the work as the best book on philosophy of religion written from an atheistic point of view since J. L. Mackie’s The Miracle of Theism. Protestant philosopher William Lane Craig describes the work as an "acid bath for theism" and writes "I can think of no other treatment of theism, whether by theist or non-theist, comparable to it. Its combination of wide-ranging scope and penetrating analysis makes it a unique contribution to philosophical theology. The product of a lifetime of study, Logic and Theism is testimony to Howard Sobel’s remarkable mastery of this subject, for very few contemporary philosophers could have written so comprehensive and incisive a treatment."

== Books ==
- Taking Chances: Essays on Rational Choice, Cambridge University Press (1994)
- Puzzles for the Will, University of Toronto Press (1998)
- Logic and Theism: Arguments for and against Beliefs in God, Cambridge University Press (2004)
- Walls and Vaults: A Natural Science of Morals, Wiley (2011)

== Book manuscripts ==
At the time of his death, Sobel had been working on several book projects. With the exception of Walls and Vaults, which was published posthumously, all these books remain unpublished, but are available on the archived version of his website.

- No Light Matter: Socrates and Plato on Justice
- Ends and Means: Aristotle on Happiness and Virtue
- The Mystery and The Glory: Immanuel Kant’s Philosophy of Morals
- Good and Gold: a Judgmental History of Metaethics from G. E. Moore through J. L. Mackie
- Words and Symbols, Proofs and Invalidations
