= Five Ways (Aquinas) =

Aquinas's arguments that there is a real God

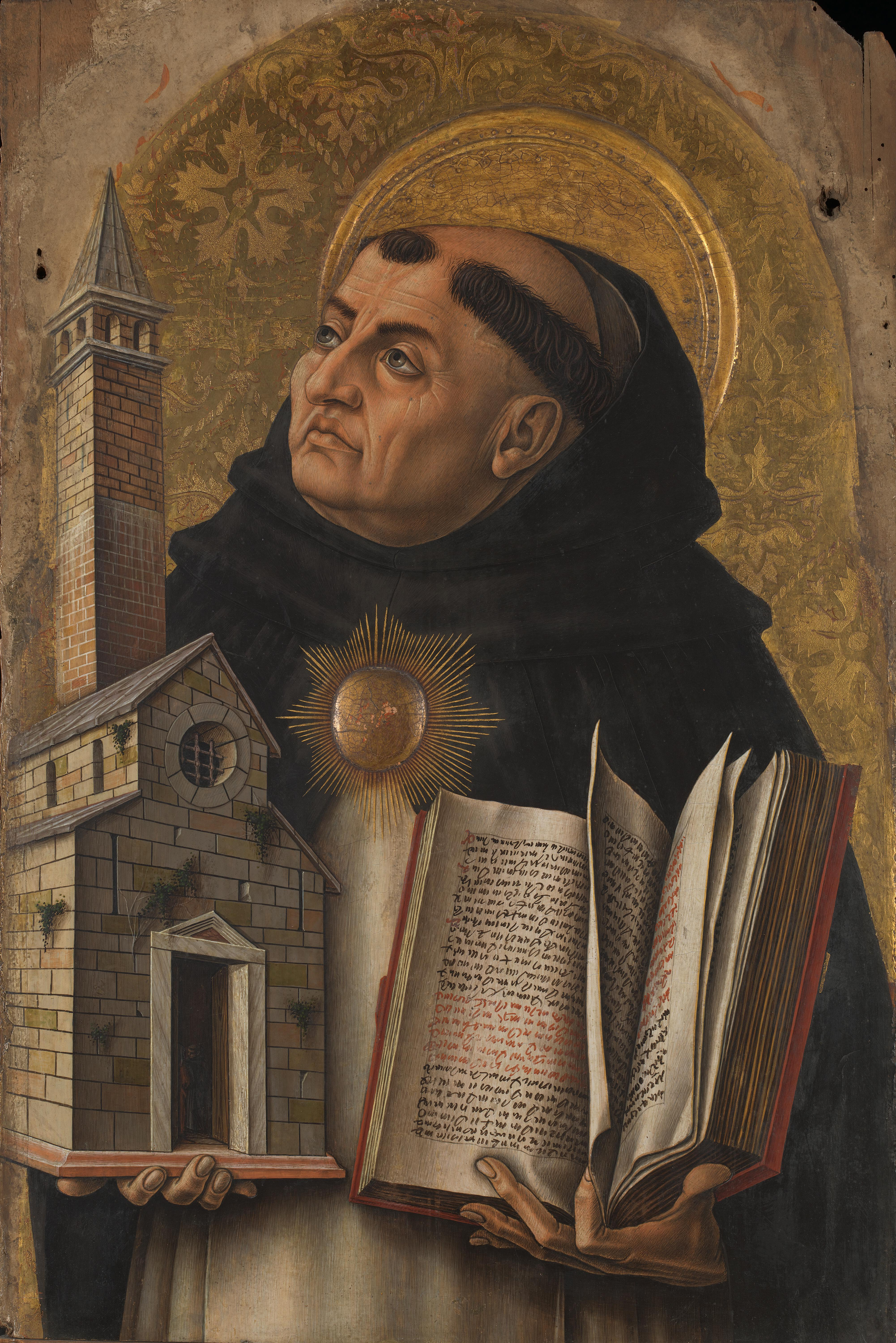
Thomas Aquinas, the 13th-century Dominican friar and theologian who formalised the "Five Ways" intended to demonstrate God's existence

The Five Ways, or Quinque viæ, are five short arguments for the existence of God, written by the medieval Christian theologian and philosopher Thomas Aquinas in the 13th century. They appear in his major work, the Summa Theologiae, where Aquinas asks whether God exists and answers yes. Each argument starts from something that people can observe in the world and reasons that it points to God as its source.

- Things in the world change and move, and each change seems to be brought about by something else.
- Everything that happens has a cause, and causes themselves have causes.
- Things in the world exist but did not have to, so something must explain why anything exists at all.
- Things can be more or less good or true, which suggests a highest standard.
- Natural things, such as plants and planets, behave in regular ways that seem to aim at an end.

In each case, Aquinas argues that the chain of explanation cannot be unending and must end in a first cause, which he identifies with God.

They draw mainly on the ideas of the philosophers Aristotle and Avicenna. He did not present the Five Ways as the only way to know God, but as a way that reason alone, without relying on religious texts, could support belief in God.

The Five Ways remain influential in Catholic thought and in the philosophy of religion. Critics have questioned whether the arguments prove what Aquinas claims, particularly the idea that a chain of causes must have a first member, while defenders argue that these criticisms misread what Aquinas meant.

== Background ==
=== Need for demonstration of the existence of God ===
Aquinas thought the finite human mind could not know what God is directly, therefore God's existence is not self-evident to us, although it is self-evident in itself. On the other hand, he also rejected the idea that God's existence cannot be demonstrated: although it is impossible to give a so-called propter quid demonstration, going from the causes to the effects; still, the proposition God exists can be "demonstrated" from God's effects, which are more known to us, through a so-called quia demonstration. However, Aquinas did not hold that what could be demonstrated philosophically (i.e. as general revelation) would necessarily provide any of the vital details revealed in Christ and through the church (i.e. as special revelation)—quite the reverse. For example, while he would allow that "in all creatures there is found the trace of the Trinity", yet "a trace shows that someone has passed by but not actually who it is."

=== Categorization ===
The first three ways are generally considered to be cosmological arguments. Aquinas omitted various arguments he believed to be insufficient or unsuited, such as the ontological argument made by Anselm of Canterbury.

=== Sources ===
A summary version of the Five Ways is given in the Summa theologiae. The Summa uses the form of scholastic disputation (i.e. a literary form based on a lecturing method: a question is raised, then the most serious objections are summarized, then a correct answer is provided in that context, then the objections are answered). A subsequent more detailed treatment of the Five Ways can be found in the Summa contra gentiles. Aquinas further elaborated each of the Five Ways in more detail in passing in multiple books.

=== Essential and accidental causal chains ===
The first two Ways relate to causation. When Aquinas argues that a causal chain cannot be infinitely long, he does not have in mind a chain where each element is a prior event that causes the next event; in other words, he is not arguing for a first event in a sequence. Rather, his argument is that a chain of concurrent or simultaneous effects must be rooted ultimately in a cause capable of generating these effects, and hence for a cause that is first in the hierarchical sense, not the temporal sense.

Aquinas follows the distinction found in Aristotle's Physics 8.5, and developed by Simplicius, Maimonides, and Avicenna that a causal chain may be either accidental (Socrates's father caused Socrates, Socrates's grandfather caused Socrates's father, but Socrates's grandfather only accidentally caused Socrates) or essential (a stick is moving a stone, because a hand is simultaneously moving the stick, and thus transitively the hand is moving the stone.)

An accidental series of causes is one in which the earlier causes need no longer exist in order for the series to continue. ... An essential series of causes is one in which the first, and every intermediate member of the series, must continue to exist in order for the causal series to continue as such.

— "Agellius" (paraphrasing Feser), The First Cause Argument Misunderstood

His thinking here relies on what would later be labelled "essentially ordered causal series" by John Duns Scotus. In Duns Scotus, it is a causal series in which the immediately observable elements are not capable of generating the effect in question, and a cause capable of doing so is inferred at the far end of the chain. Ordinatio I.2.43. This is also why Aquinas rejected that reason can prove the universe must have had a beginning in time; for all he knows and can demonstrate the universe could have been 'created from eternity' by the eternal God. He accepts the biblical doctrine of creation as a truth of faith, not reason. For a discussion of a causal chain argument that is based on a created beginning, see Kalam cosmological argument.

== The Five Ways ==
=== First way: The Argument of the Unmoved Mover ===
==== Summary ====
In the world, we can see that at least some things are changing. Whatever is changing is being changed by something else. If that by which it is changing is itself changed, then it too is being changed by something else. But this chain cannot be infinitely long, so there must be something that changes others without itself changing. This everyone understands to be God.

==== Explanation ====
This argument is a summary of a much longer argument, which is in the Summa Contra Gentiles, which itself is a summary of a much longer argument given by Aristotle in both The Physics, and The Metaphysics. Most arguments in the Summa are shortened arguments of much longer disputations. Hence, why some translate, "Summa Theologiae", as, "Summary Of Theology".

Aquinas uses the term "motion" in his argument, but by this he understands any kind of "change", more specifically a transit from potentiality to actuality. (For example, a puddle growing to be larger would be counted inside the boundaries of Aquinas's usage.) Since a potential does not yet exist (at least in a world with causality, such as our own), it cannot cause itself to exist and can therefore only be brought into existence by something already existing.

Suarez contested the Aristotelian principle according to which all that moves is moved by something else (in Latin: omne quod movetur ab alio movetur), noting that living beings are capable of moving by themselves and are not moved by anything else, and that the heavens could be moved by a form internal to them. He then reformulated the principle to omne quod fit ab alio fit (everything that is made, is made by something else), and created the following argument:

every entity is either made or not made and is uncreated; but all beings that are in the universe cannot be made; therefore it is necessary that there be some unmade, uncreated and eternal entity

— F. Suarez, Disputationes metaphisicae, 29, 1

=== Second way: The Argument of the First Cause ===
==== Summary ====
In the world, we can see that some things are caused. But it is not possible for something to be the cause of itself because this would entail that it exists prior to itself, which is a contradiction. If that by which it is caused is itself caused, then it too must have a cause. But this cannot be an infinitely long chain, so, there must be a cause which is not itself caused by anything further. This everyone understands to be God.

==== Explanation ====
As in the First Way, the causes Aquinas has in mind are not sequential events, but rather simultaneously existing dependency relationships: Aristotle's efficient cause. For example, plant growth depends on sunlight and water, which depend on "ideal atmospheric activities", which are "governed by more fundamental causes", and so on. Aquinas is not arguing for a cause that is first in a sequence, but rather first in a hierarchy: a principal cause, rather than a derivative cause.

=== Third way: The Argument from Time and Contingency ===
==== Summary ====
In the world we see things that are possible to be and possible not to be. In other words, perishable things. But if everything were contingent and thus capable of going out of existence, then, eventually everything would perish, and nothing would exist now. But things clearly do exist now. Therefore, there must be things that are imperishable: necessary beings. But some necessary beings receive their incorruptibility from something else. Those necessary beings which give the power of incorruptibility may also receive their incorruptibility, and those who give them their power may also receive their incorruptibility and so on. But this cannot go on forever, and so we come to a necessary being that has not received their necessity, and is necessary in itself. And this everyone understands to be God.

==== Explanation ====
This argument seems to be a summary of another longer argument called, "Proof Of The Truthful", given by the Islamic theologian, Avicenna, who argued for the existence of a necessary being like the first half of this argument. But, Aquinas didn't think that finding a necessary being was enough, especially since he believed that human souls, and angels were incorruptible necessary beings. And so, he added on the second half of the argument which follows like the first two ways, i.e. the impossibility of an infinite regress in causation.

The argument begins with the observation that things around us come into and go out of existence: animals die, buildings are destroyed, etc. But if everything were like this, then, at some time nothing would exist. Some interpreters read Aquinas to mean that assuming an infinite past, all possibilities would be realized and everything would go out of existence. Since this is clearly not the case, then there must be at least one thing that does not have the possibility of going out of existence. However, this explanation seems to involve the fallacy of composition (quantifier shift). Moreover, it does not seem to be in keeping with Aquinas's principle that, among natural things, the corruption of one thing is always the generation of another.

Alternatively, one could read Aquinas to be arguing as follows: if there is eternal change, so that things are eternally being generated and corrupted, and since an eternal effect requires an eternal cause (just as a necessary conclusion requires necessary premises), then there must exist an eternal agent which can account for the eternity of generation and corruption. To hold the alternative, namely that an infinite series of contingent causes would be able to explain eternal generation and corruption, would posit a circular argument: Why is there eternal generation and corruption? Because there is an eternal series of causes which are being generated and corrupted. And why is there an infinite series of causes which are being generated and corrupted? Because there is eternal generation and corruption. Since such an explanation is not acceptable, there must be (at least one) eternal and necessary being.

=== Fourth way: The Argument from Degree ===
==== Summary ====
We see things in the world that vary in degrees of goodness, truth, nobility, etc. For example, well-drawn circles are better than poorly drawn ones, healthy animals are better than sick animals. Moreover, some substances are better than others, since living things are better than non-living things, and animals are better than plants, in testimony of which no one would choose to lose their senses for the sake of having the longevity of a tree. But judging something as being "more" or "less" implies some standard against which it is being judged. For example, in a room full of people of varying heights, at least one must be tallest. Therefore, there is something which is best and most true, and most a being, etc. Aquinas then adds the premise: what is most in a genus is the cause of all else in that genus. From this he deduces that there exists some most-good being which causes goodness in all else, and this everyone understands to be God.

==== Explanation ====
The argument is rooted in Aristotle and Plato but its developed form is found in Anselm of Canterbury's Monologion. Although the argument has Platonic influences, Aquinas was not a Platonist and did not believe in the Theory of Forms. Rather, he is arguing that things that only have partial or flawed existence indicate that they are not their own sources of existence, and so must rely on something else as the source of their existence. The argument makes use of the theory of transcendentals: properties of existence. For example, "true" presents an aspect of existence, as any existent thing will be "true" insofar as it is true that it exists. Or "one," insofar as any existent thing will be (at least) "one thing".

The premise which seems to cause the most difficulty among interpreters of the fourth way is that the greatest in a genus is the cause of all else in the genus. This premise does not seem to be universally true, and indeed, Aquinas himself thinks that this premise is not always true, but only under certain circumstances: namely, when 1) the lesser things in the genus need a cause, and 2) there is nothing outside the genus which can be the cause. When these two conditions are met, the premise that the greatest in the genus is the cause of all else in that genus holds, since nothing gives what it does not have. Since Aquinas is dealing specifically with transcendentals like being and goodness, and since there is nothing outside the transcendentals, it follows that there is nothing outside the genus which could be a cause (condition 2). Moreover, if something has less than the maximum being or goodness or truth, then it must not have being or goodness or truth in itself. For example, how could what has circularity itself be less than fully circular? Therefore, whatever has less than the maximum being or goodness or truth must need a cause of their being and goodness and truth (condition 1).

=== Fifth way: Argument from Final Cause or Ends ===
==== Summary ====
We see various objects that lack intelligence in the world behaving in regular ways. This cannot be due to chance since then they would not behave with predictable results. So their behavior must be set. But it cannot be set by themselves since they are non-intelligent and have no notion of how to set behavior. Therefore, their behavior must be set by something else, and by implication something that must be intelligent. This everyone understands to be God.

==== Explanation ====
This is also known as the teleological argument. However, it is not a "Cosmic Watchmaker" argument from design (see below). Instead, as the 1920 Dominican translation puts it, The fifth way is taken from the governance of the world. The Fifth Way uses Aristotle's final cause. Aristotle argued that a complete explanation of an object will involve knowledge of how it came to be (efficient cause), what material it consists of (material cause), what makes it what it is (formal cause), and the thing that it works toward (final cause). The concept of final causes involves the concept of dispositions or "ends": a specific goal or aim towards which something strives. For example, acorns regularly develop into oak trees but never into sea lions. The oak tree is the "end" towards which the acorn "points", its disposition, even if it fails to achieve maturity. The implication is that if something has an end towards which it strives, it is either because it is intelligent or because something intelligent is guiding it.

It must be emphasized that this argument is distinct from the design argument associated with William Paley and the Intelligent Design movement. The latter implicitly argue that objects in the world do not have inherent dispositions or ends, but, like Paley's watch, will not naturally have a purpose unless forced to due to some outside agency. The latter also focus on complexity and interworking parts as the effect needing explanation (e.g., that an eye has a complicated function therefore a design therefore a designer), whereas the Fifth Way takes as its starting point any regularity (e.g., that the pattern that things exist with an end itself allows us to recursively arrive at God as the ultimate source of ends without being constrained by any external end).

== Criticism ==
=== Philosophical ===
Criticism of the cosmological argument, and hence the first three Ways, emerged in the 18th century by the philosophers David Hume and Immanuel Kant. Kant argued that our minds give structure to the raw materials of reality and that the world is therefore divided into the phenomenal world (the world we experience and know), and the noumenal world (the world as it is "in itself", which we can never know). Since the cosmological arguments reason from what we experience, and hence the phenomenal world, to an inferred cause, and hence the noumenal world, since the noumenal world lies beyond our knowledge, we can never know what's there. Kant also argued that the concept of a necessary being is incoherent, and that the cosmological argument presupposes its coherence, and therefore the arguments fail. Hume argued that since we can conceive of causes and effects as separate, there is no necessary connection between them and therefore we cannot necessarily reason from an observed effect to an inferred cause. Hume also argued that explaining the causes of individual elements explains everything, and therefore there is no need for a cause of the whole of reality.

The 20th-century philosopher of religion Richard Swinburne argued in his book, Simplicity as Evidence of Truth, that these arguments are only strong when collected together, and that individually each of them is weak. The 20th-century Catholic priest and philosopher Frederick Copleston devoted much of his work to a modern explication and expansion of Aquinas's arguments. In the 21st century, the prominent Thomistic philosopher Edward Feser has argued in his book Aquinas: A Beginner's Guide that Richard Dawkins, Hume, Kant, and most modern philosophers do not have a correct understanding of Aquinas at all; that the arguments are often difficult to translate into modern terms. He has defended the arguments in a book at length. Atheist philosopher J. H. Sobel offers objections to the first three Ways by challenging the notion of sustaining efficient causes and a concurrent actualizer of existence. Atheist philosopher Graham Oppy has offered critiques of the arguments in his exchanges with Edward Feser and in his published work.

=== Popular ===
Biologist Richard Dawkins's book The God Delusion argues against the Five Ways. According to Dawkins, "[t]he five 'proofs' asserted by Thomas Aquinas in the thirteenth century don't prove anything, and are easily ... exposed as vacuous." In Why There Almost Certainly Is a God: Doubting Dawkins, philosopher Keith Ward claims that Dawkins mis-stated the five ways, and thus responds with a straw man. For example, for the fifth Way, Dawkins places it in the same position for his criticism as the watchmaker analogy, when in fact, according to Ward, they are vastly different arguments. Ward defended the utility of the five ways (for instance, on the fourth argument he states that all possible smells must pre-exist in the mind of God, but that God, being by his nature non-physical, does not himself stink) whilst pointing out that they only constitute a proof of God if one first begins with a proposition that the universe can be rationally understood. Nevertheless, he argues that they are useful in allowing us to understand what God will be like given this initial presupposition.

== See also ==
- Actus primus
- Regressus ad infinitum
