= Unmoved mover =

Postulated primary cause of all activity in the universe

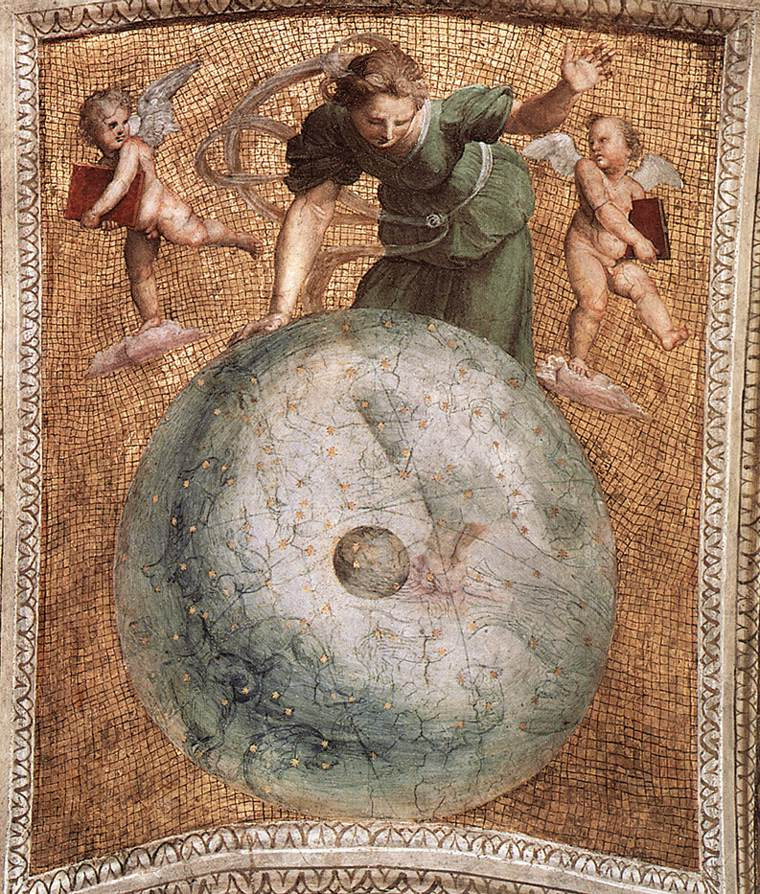
Raphael's depiction of the unmoved mover from the Stanza della Segnatura

The unmoved mover (Ancient Greek: ὃ οὐ κινούμενον κινεῖ, romanized: ho ou kinoúmenon kineî, lit. 'that which moves without being moved'), or prime mover (Latin: primum movens), is a concept advanced by Aristotle as a primary cause, or first uncaused cause, or "mover" of all the motion in the universe. As is implicit in the name, the unmoved mover moves other things, but is not itself moved by any prior action. In Book 12 (Ancient Greek: Λ) of his Metaphysics, Aristotle describes the unmoved mover as being perfectly beautiful, indivisible, and contemplating only the perfect contemplation: self-contemplation. He also equates this concept with the active intellect. This Aristotelian concept had its roots in cosmological speculations of the earliest Greek pre-Socratic philosophers, and became highly influential and widely drawn upon in medieval philosophy and theology. For example, St. Thomas Aquinas elaborated on the unmoved mover in the Five Ways.

== First philosophy ==
Aristotle argues, in Book 8 of the Physics and Book 12 of the Metaphysics, "that there must be an immortal, unchanging being, ultimately responsible for all wholeness and orderliness in the sensible world." In the Physics (VIII 4–6) Aristotle finds "surprising difficulties" explaining even commonplace change, and in support of his approach of explanation by four causes, he required "a fair bit of technical machinery". This "machinery" includes potentiality and actuality, hylomorphism, the theory of categories, and "an audacious and intriguing argument, that the bare existence of change requires the postulation of a first cause, an unmoved mover whose necessary existence underpins the ceaseless activity of the world of motion". Aristotle's "first philosophy", or Metaphysics ("after the Physics"), develops his peculiar theology of the prime mover, as πρῶτον κινοῦν ἀκίνητον: an independent divine eternal unchanging immaterial substance.

=== Celestial spheres ===
Aristotle adopted the geometrical model of Eudoxus of Cnidus to provide a general explanation of the apparent wandering of the classical planets arising from uniform circular motions of celestial spheres. While the number of spheres in the model itself was subject to change (47 or 55), Aristotle's account of aether, and of potentiality and actuality, required an individual unmoved mover for each sphere.

=== Final cause and efficient cause ===
Simplicius argues that the first unmoved mover is a cause not only in the sense of being a final cause—which everyone in his day, as in ours, would accept—but also in the sense of being an efficient cause (1360. 24ff.), and his master Ammonius wrote a whole book defending the thesis (ibid. 1363. 8–10). Simplicius's arguments include citations of Plato's views in the Timaeus—evidence not relevant to the debate unless one happens to believe in the essential harmony of Plato and Aristotle—and inferences from approving remarks which Aristotle makes about the role of Nous in Anaxagoras, which require a good deal of reading between the lines. But he does point out rightly that the unmoved mover fits the definition of an efficient cause—"whence the first source of change or rest" (Phys. II. 3, 194b29–30; Simpl. 1361. 12ff.). The examples which Aristotle adduces do not obviously suggest an application to the first unmoved mover, and it is at least possible that Aristotle originated his fourfold distinction without reference to such an entity. But the real question is whether his definition of the efficient cause includes the unmoved mover willy-nilly. One curious fact remains: that Aristotle never acknowledges the alleged fact that the unmoved mover is an efficient cause (a problem of which Simplicius is well aware: 1363. 12–14)...

— D. W. Graham, Physics

Despite their apparent function in the celestial model, the unmoved movers were a final cause, not an efficient cause for the movement of the spheres; they were solely a constant inspiration, and even if taken for an efficient cause precisely due to being a final cause, the nature of the explanation is purely teleological.

=== Aristotle's theology ===
The unmoved mover, if they were anywhere, were said to fill the outer void beyond the sphere of fixed stars:

It is clear then that there is neither place, nor void, nor time, outside the heaven. Hence whatever is there, is of such a nature as not to occupy any place, nor does time age it; nor is there any change in any of the things which lie beyond the outermost motion; they continue through their entire duration unalterable and unmodified, living the best and most self sufficient of lives… From [the fulfilment of the whole heaven] derive the being and life which other things, some more or less articulately but other feebly, enjoy.

— Aristotle, De Caelo, I.9, 279 a17–30

The unmoved mover is an immaterial substance (separate and individual beings), having neither parts nor magnitude. As such, it would be physically impossible for them to move material objects of any size by pushing, pulling, or collision. Because matter is, for Aristotle, a substratum in which a potential to change can be actualized, any potentiality must be actualized in an eternal being, but it must not be still because continuous activity is essential for all forms of life. This immaterial form of activity must be intellectual and cannot be contingent upon sensory perception if it is to remain uniform; therefore, eternal substance must think only of thinking itself and exist outside the starry sphere, where even the notion of place is undefined for Aristotle. Their influence on lesser beings is purely the result of an "aspiration or desire," and each aetheric celestial sphere emulates one of the unmoved movers, as best it can, by uniform circular motion. The first heaven, the outmost sphere of fixed stars, is moved by a desire to emulate the prime mover (first cause), (Note: Now understood as the Earth's rotation) about whom, the subordinate movers suffer an accidental dependency.

Many of Aristotle's contemporaries complained that oblivious, powerless gods are unsatisfactory. Nonetheless, it was a life which Aristotle enthusiastically endorsed as one most enviable and perfect, the unembellished basis of theology. As the whole of nature depends on the inspiration of the eternal unmoved movers, Aristotle was concerned with establishing the metaphysical necessity of the perpetual motions of the heavens. Through the Sun's seasonal action upon the terrestrial spheres, the cycles of generation and corruption give rise to all natural motion as efficient cause.

The intellect, nous, "or whatever else it be that is thought to rule and lead us by nature, and to have cognizance of what is noble and divine" is the highest activity, according to Aristotle (contemplation or speculative thinking, theōríā). It is also the most sustainable, pleasant, self-sufficient activity; something which is aimed at for its own sake. Unlike politics and warfare, it does not involve doing things we'd rather not do, but rather something we do at our leisure. This aim is not strictly human: to achieve it means to live following not mortal thoughts but something immortal and divine within humans. According to Aristotle, contemplation is the only type of happy activity that it would not be ridiculous to imagine the gods having. In Aristotle's psychology and biology, the intellect is the soul (see also eudaimonia). According to Giovanni Reale, the first Unmoved Mover is a living, thinking, and personal God who "possesses the theoretical knowledge alone or in the highest degree...knows not only Himself, but all things in their causes and first principles."

=== First cause ===
In Book VIII of his Physics, Aristotle examines the notions of change or motion, and attempts to show by a challenging argument, that the mere supposition of a 'before' and an 'after', requires a first principle. He argues that in the beginning, if the cosmos had come to be, its first motion would lack an antecedent state; and, as Parmenides said, "nothing comes from nothing". The cosmological argument, later attributed to Aristotle, thereby concludes that God exists. However, if the cosmos had a beginning, Aristotle argued, it would require an efficient first cause, a notion that Aristotle took to demonstrate a critical flaw.

But it is a wrong assumption to suppose universally that we have an adequate first principle in virtue of the fact that something always is so ... Thus Democritus reduces the causes that explain nature to the fact that things happened in the past in the same way as they happen now: but he does not think fit to seek for a first principle to explain this 'always' ... Let this conclude what we have to say in support of our contention that there never was a time when there was not motion, and never will be a time when there will not be motion.

— Physics VIII, 2

The purpose of Aristotle's cosmological argument that at least one eternal unmoved mover must exist is to support everyday change.

Of things that exist, substances are the first. But if substances can, then all things can perish... and yet, time and change cannot. Now, the only continuous change is that of place, and the only continuous change of place is circular motion. Therefore, there must be an eternal circular motion and this is confirmed by the fixed stars which are moved by the eternal actual substance that's purely actual.

In Aristotle's estimation, an explanation without the temporal actuality and potentiality of an infinite locomotive chain is required for an eternal cosmos with neither beginning nor end: an unmoved eternal substance for whom the Primum Mobile (Note: The outermost celestial sphere, for Aristotle, the sphere of fixed stars.) turns diurnally, whereby all terrestrial cycles are driven by day and night, the seasons of the year, the transformation of the elements, and the nature of plants and animals.

== Substance and change ==
Aristotle begins by describing substance, of which he says there are three types: the sensible, subdivided into the perishable, which belongs to physics, and the eternal, which belongs to "another science." He notes that sensible substance is changeable and that there are several types of change, including quality and quantity, generation and destruction, increase and diminution, alteration, and motion. Change occurs when one given state becomes something contrary to it: that is to say, what exists potentially comes to exist actually (see potentiality and actuality). Therefore, "a thing [can come to be], incidentally, out of that which is not, [and] also all things come to be out of that which is, but is potentially, and is not actually." That by which something is changed is the mover, that which is changed is the matter, and that into which it is changed is the form. Substance is necessarily composed of different elements. The proof for this is that there are things that are different from each other and that all things are composed of elements. Since elements combine to form composite substances, and because these substances differ from each other, there must be different elements: in other words, "b or a cannot be the same as ba."

== Number of movers ==
Near the end of Metaphysics, Book Λ, Aristotle introduces a surprising question, asking "whether we have to suppose one such [mover] or more than one, and if the latter, how many." Aristotle concludes that the number of all the movers equals the number of separate movements, and we can determine these by considering the mathematical science most akin to philosophy, i.e., astronomy. Although the mathematicians differ on the number of movements, Aristotle considers that the number of celestial spheres would be 47 or 55. Nonetheless, he concludes his Metaphysics, Book Λ, with a quotation from the Iliad: "The rule of many is not good; one ruler let there be."

== Influence ==
Italian Catholic priest and philosopher Thomas Aquinas was a major proponent of the unmoved mover, expanding upon the concept in his First Way.

In 1892, John Burnet wrote:

The Neoplatonists were quite justified in regarding themselves as the spiritual heirs of Pythagoras; and, in their hands, philosophy ceased to exist as such, and became theology. And this tendency was at work all along; hardly a single Greek philosopher was wholly uninfluenced by it. Perhaps Aristotle might seem to be an exception; but it is probable that, if we still possessed a few such "exoteric" works as the Protreptikos in their entirety, we should find that the enthusiastic words in which he speaks of the "blessed life" in the Metaphysics and in the Ethics (Nicomachean Ethics) were less isolated outbursts of feeling than they appear now. In later days, Apollonios of Tyana showed in practice what this sort of thing must ultimately lead to. The theurgy and thaumaturgy of the late Greek schools were only the fruit of the seed sown by the generation which immediately preceded the Persian War.

Aristotle's principles of being influenced Anselm's view of God, whom he called "that than which nothing greater can be conceived." Anselm thought God did not feel emotions such as anger or love but appeared to do so through our imperfect understanding. The incongruity of judging "being" against something that might not exist may have led Anselm to his famous ontological argument for God's existence. Many medieval philosophers used the idea of approaching a knowledge of God through negative attributes. For example, we should not say that God exists in the usual sense of the term; all we can safely say is that God is not nonexistent. We should not say that God is wise, but we can say that God is not ignorant (i.e., in some way, God has some properties of knowledge). We should not say that God is One, but we can state that there is no multiplicity in God's being.

Many later Jewish, Islamic, and Christian philosophers accepted Aristotelian theological concepts. Key Jewish philosophers included ibn Tibbon, Maimonides, and Gersonides, among many others. Their views of God are considered mainstream by many Jews of all denominations, even today. Preeminent among Islamic philosophers who were influenced by Aristotelian theology are Avicenna and Averroes. In Christian theology, the key philosopher influenced by Aristotle was undoubtedly Thomas Aquinas. There had been earlier Aristotelian influences within Christianity (notably Anselm), but Aquinas (who, incidentally, found his Aristotelian influence via Avicenna, Averroes, and Maimonides) incorporated extensive Aristotelian ideas throughout his theology. Through Aquinas and the Scholastic Christian theology of which he was a significant part, Aristotle became "academic theology's great authority in the thirteenth century", and also influenced Christian theology that became widespread and deeply embedded. However, notable Christian theologians rejected (Note: Especially since the 1990s, scholars have argued that the early Reformers have been misunderstood in their stance against Aristotle (and the Scholasticism that he permeated). A distinction must be made between scholastic methodology and its theological content. See the self-avowedly ground-breaking collection, Protestant Scholasticism, eds. Trueman, Carl, and R. Scott Clark, 1997, page xix. Even within that volume, however, Luther is admitted to have made a complete, sincere, and absolute renunciation of scholasticism (see D.V.N.Bagchi within Trueman and Clark, page 11).) Aristotelian theological influence, especially the first generation of Christian Reformers, (Note: Luther is certainly more acerbic and quotable, but both John Calvin, who "denounced scholastic theology as contemptible" (Payton, James R., Jr, Getting the Reformation Wrong, 2010, page 197), and Melanchthon, who found that the church had "embraced Aristotle instead of Christ" (see Melanchthon, Loci Communes, 1521 edition, 23) also rejected Aristotelian elements of scholasticism.) most notably Martin Luther. In subsequent Protestant theology, Aristotelian thought quickly reemerged in Protestant scholasticism.

== See also ==
- Big Bang – Physical theory of the cosmos
- Book of the 24 Philosophers – Philosophical and theological medieval text of uncertain authorship
- Brahman – Metaphysical concept, unchanging Ultimate Reality in Hinduism
- Conceptions of God
- Dynamics of the celestial spheres – Classical theories concerning movement of spheres
- Eternal recurrence – Concept of perpetual recurrence of time
- Existence of God – Philosophical question
- Henosis – Classical Greek word for mystical oneness
- Henotheism – Worshipping a god, accepting others may exist
- Logos – Concept in philosophy, religion, rhetoric, and psychology
- Monad – Philosophical concept of a most basic substance, or supreme being
- The One – Platonic philosophical system
- Primum Mobile – Outermost moving sphere in the geocentric model of the universe
- Causa sui – Term that denotes something that is generated within itself
- Tao – Philosophical concept native to China

== Sources ==
- The Theology of Aristotle in the Stanford Encyclopedia of Philosophy
- John W. Watt (2019). The Aristotelian Tradition in Syriac. Routledge. ISBN 9780429817489.
- Gilles Emery; Matthew Levering (2015). Aristotle in Aquinas's Theology. Oxford University Press. ISBN 9780198749639.
- Richard Bodeus (2000). Aristotle and the Theology of the Living Immortals. SUNY Press. ISBN 9780791447284.
- Otfried Hoffe (2003). Aristotle. SUNY Press. ISBN 9780791456347.
