= Open theism =

Christian theological movement

Open theism, also known as openness theology, is a theological movement that has developed within Christianity as a rejection of the synthesis of Greek philosophy and Christian theology. It is a version of free will theism and arises out of the free will theistic tradition of the church, which goes back to the early Church Fathers. Open theism is typically advanced as a biblically motivated and logically consistent theology of human and divine freedom (in the libertarian sense), with an emphasis on what this means for the content of God's foreknowledge and exercise of God's power.

Open theist theologian Thomas Jay Oord identifies four paths to open and relational theology:

1. following the biblical witness,
2. following themes in some Christian theological traditions,
3. following the philosophy of free will, and
4. following the path of reconciling faith and science.

Roger E. Olson said that open theism triggered the "most significant controversy about the doctrine of God in evangelical thought" in the late 20th and early 21st centuries.

== Exposition of open theism ==
In short, open theism posits that since God and humans are free, God's knowledge is dynamic and God's providence flexible. Whereas several versions of traditional theism picture God's knowledge of the future as a singular, fixed trajectory, open theism sees it as a plurality of branching possibilities, with some possibilities becoming settled as time moves forward. Thus, the future, as well as God's knowledge of it, is open (hence, "open" theism). Other versions of classical theism hold that the future has been fully determined, entailing that there is no free choice (the future is closed) for God or for humans. Yet other versions of classical theism hold that, though there is freedom of choice, God's omniscience necessitates God's foreknowing what free choices are made (God's foreknowledge is closed). Open theists hold that these versions of classical theism do not agree with the biblical concept of God; the biblical understanding of divine and creaturely freedom; and/or result in incoherence. Open theists tend to emphasize that God's most fundamental character trait is love and that this trait is unchangeable. They also (in contrast to traditional theism) tend to hold that the biblical portrait is of a God deeply moved by creation, experiencing a variety of feelings in response to it.

=== Comparison of open and Reformed theism ===
The following chart compares beliefs about key doctrines as stated by open theists and Calvinists after "the period of controversy" between adherents of the two theisms began in 1994. During this period the "theology of open theism… rocked the evangelical world".

Doctrine	Open Theism	Calvinism
Scripture (the Bible). "In the Christian tradition, the Old and the New Testaments are considered Holy Scripture in that they are, or convey, the self-revelation of God."	"Committed to affirming the infallibility of Scripture"	Scripture is "the infallible Word of God".
God's Power. "God's power is limited only by God's own nature and not by any external force."	"God is all-powerful."	"God is all-powerful."
God's Sovereignty. "God's ultimate Lordship and rule over the universe".	Portraying God as ordaining whatever happens reduces "humans to robots".	"Nothing that exists or occurs falls outside God's ordaining will. Nothing, including no evil person or thing or event or deed."
God's Perfection. "God as lacking nothing and free of all moral imperfection".	Believes in "(because Scripture teaches) the absolute perfection of God."	Believes that, because "Scripture says" it, God "will always do what is right".
God's Foreknowledge. "God's knowing things and events before they happen in history".	"God is omniscient" about "settled" reality, but the future that God "leaves open" can be known only as open "possibility" without specific foreknowledge.	Classically Augustinian-Calvinist view: "God knows the future because he preordains it."
The Fall. "The disobedience and sin of Adam and Eve that caused them to lose the state of innocence in which they had been created. This event plunged them and all mankind into a state of sin and corruption."	God "does not unilaterally and irrevocably decide what to do". God's decisions are influenced by "human attitudes and responses".	"Ultimate reason" for the Fall was "God's ordaining will".
Free Will. "The term seeks to describe the free choice of the will which all persons possess. Theological debates have arisen over the ways and to the extent to which sin has affected the power to choose good over evil, and hence one's 'free will'."	Promotes incompatibilism, the doctrine that "the agent's power to do otherwise" is "a necessary condition for acting freely".	Promotes compatibilism, the doctrine that freedom of the will requires only "the power or ability to do what one will (desire or choose) to do" without constraint or impediment, even if what one wills is determined.
Free Will and God's Sovereignty. A "caustic debate" began about 1990 over "God's sovereignty and human free will".	Saying that God governs human choices reduces "angels or humans to robots in order to attain his objectives."	God governs "the choices of human beings", but without "cancelling [their] freedom and responsibility".
Theodicy issue. "The justification of a deity's justice and goodness in light of suffering and evil".	To meet the "conditions of love", God exercises "general rather than specific sovereignty, which explains why God does not prevent all evil". Also, God "does not completely control or in any sense will evil" because the world is "held hostage to a cosmic evil force".	Because "Scripture says" it, God "will always do what is right".

== Historical development ==
Contemporary open theists have named precursors among philosophers to document their assertion that "the open view of the future is not a recent concept," but has a long history.

The first known post-biblical Christian writings advocating concepts similar to open theism with regard to the issue of foreknowledge are found in the writings of Calcidius, a 4th-century interpreter of Plato. It was affirmed in the 16th century by Socinus, and in the early 18th century by Samuel Fancourt and Andrew Michael Ramsay. In the 19th century several theologians wrote in defense of this idea, including Isaak August Dorner, Gustav Fechner, Otto Pfleiderer, Jules Lequier, Adam Clarke, Billy Hibbard, Joel Hayes, T.W. Brents, and Lorenzo D. McCabe. Contributions to this defense increased as the century drew to a close. (Note: Retrospective lists of (approximately) open theists: Jowers (2005) names Audius and Socinus. Sanders (2007) names the following as “proponents” of “dynamic omniscience”: Edgar S. Brightman, Adam Clarke, Isaak Dorner, Samuel Fancourt, Gustave T. Fechner, Billy Hibbert, William James, Lorenzo D. McCabe, Otto Pfleiderer, and Andrew Ramsay. Boyd (2008, 2014) names the following as “open theists”: 4th century Calcidius, 18th–19th century T.W. Brents, Adam Clarke, Isaac Dorner, Samuel Fancourt, G.T. Fechner, J. Greenrup, Joel Hayes, Billy Hibbard, J. Jones, Jules Lequier, Lorenzo McCabe, Otto Pfleiderer, D.U. Simon, and W. Taylor.)

The dynamic omniscience view has been affirmed by a number of non Christians as well: Cicero (1st century BC) Alexander of Aphrodisias (2nd century) and Porphyry (3rd century). God's statement to Abraham “Now I know that you fear me” (Gen 22:12) was much discussed by Medieval Jewish theologians. Two significant Jewish thinkers who affirmed dynamic omniscience as the proper interpretation of the passage were Ibn Ezra (12th century) and Gersonides (14th century).

Sergei Bulgakov, an early-20th-century Russian Orthodox priest and theologian advocated the use of the term panentheism, which articulated a necessary link between God and creation as consequence of God's free love and not as a natural necessity. His sophiology has sometimes been seen as a precursor to 'open theism'.

David R. Larson claimed in 2007 that "in less detailed forms the basics of 'Open Theism' have been taught at Loma Linda University for about fifty years, beginning at least as early as long-time professor Jack W. Provonsha." Provonsha started teaching at Loma Linda about 1960.

Millard Erickson belittles such precursors to open theism as "virtually unknown or unnoticed."

=== After 1980 ===
The term "open theism" was introduced in 1980 with theologian Richard Rice's book The Openness of God: The Relationship of Divine Foreknowledge and Human Free Will. The broader articulation of open theism was given in 1994, when five essays were published by evangelical scholars (including Rice) under the title The Openness of God. Recent theologians of note expressing this view include: Clark Pinnock (deceased as of 2010), Greg Boyd, Thomas Jay Oord, John E. Sanders, Jürgen Moltmann, Richard Rice, C. Peter Wagner, John Polkinghorne, Hendrikus Berkhof, Adrio Konig, Harry Boer, Bethany Sollereder, Matt Parkins, Thomas Finger (Mennonite), W. Norris Clarke (Roman Catholic), Brian Hebblethwaite, Robert Ellis, Kenneth Archer (Pentecostal), Barry Callen (Church of God), Henry Knight III, Gordon Olson, and Winkie Pratney. A significant, growing number of philosophers of religion affirm it: Peter Van Inwagen, Richard Swinburne (Eastern Orthodox), William Hasker, David Basinger, Nicholas Wolterstorff, Dean Zimmerman, Timothy O'Connor, Blake Ostler, James D. Rissler, Keith DeRose, Richard E. Creel, Robin Collins (philosopher/theologian/physicist), J. R. Lucas, Vincent Brümmer, (Roman Catholic), Richard Purtill, Alan Rhoda, Jeffrey Koperski, Dale Tuggy, and Keith Ward. Biblical scholars Terence E. Fretheim, Karen Winslow, and John Goldingay affirm it. Others include writers Madeleine L'Engle and Paul C. Borgman, mathematician D.J. Bartholomew and biochemist/theologian Arthur Peacocke.

== Philosophical arguments ==
Open theists maintain that traditional classical theists hold the classical attributes of God together in an incoherent way. The main classical attributes are as follows:

- All-good: God is the standard of moral perfection, all-benevolent, and perfectly loving.
- Simplicity: God has no parts, cannot be differentiated, and possesses no attribute as distinct from His being.
- Immutability: God cannot change in any respect.
- Impassibility: God cannot be affected by outside forces.
- Omnipresence: God is present everywhere, or more precisely, all things find their location in God.
- Omniscience: God knows absolutely everything: believes all truths and disbelieves all falsehoods. God's knowledge is perfect.
- Omnipotence: God can do anything because he is all-powerful and not limited by external forces.

Alleged contradictions in the traditional attributes are pointed out by open theists and atheists alike. Atheist author and educator George H. Smith writes in his book Atheism: The Case Against God that if God existed, God cannot be omnipotent because: "If God knew the future with infallible certainty, he cannot change it – in which case he cannot be omnipotent. If God can change the future, however, he cannot have infallible knowledge of it".

Open theism also answers the question of how God can be blameless and omnipotent even though evil exists in the world. H. Roy Elseth gives an example of a parent that knows with certainty that his child would go out and murder someone if he was given a gun. Elseth argues that if the parent did give the gun to the child then the parent would be responsible for that crime. However, if God was unsure about the outcome then God would not be culpable for that act; only the one who committed the act would be guilty. An orthodox Christian might try, on the contrary, to seek to ground a theodicy in the resurrection, both of Christ and the general resurrection to come, though this is not the traditional answer to evil.

== Varieties of open theists ==
Philosopher Alan Rhoda has described several different approaches several open theists have taken with regard to the future and God's knowledge of it.

- Voluntary Nescience: The future is alethically settled but remains epistemically open to God, who voluntarily chooses not to know certain truths about future contingents. This position has been associated with Dallas Willard, while explicitly rejecting the label open theist.
- Involuntary Nescience: The future is alethically settled but nevertheless epistemically open for God because truths about future contingents are in principle unknowable. William Hasker, Peter Van Inwagen, and Richard Swinburne espouse this position.
- Non-Bivalentist Omniscience: The future is alethically open and therefore epistemically open for God because propositions about future contingents are neither true nor false. J. R. Lucas and Dale Tuggy espouse this position.
- Bivalentist Omniscience: The future is alethically open and therefore epistemically open for God because propositions asserting of future contingents that they 'will' obtain or that they 'will not' obtain are both false. Instead, what is true is that they 'might and might not' obtain. Greg Boyd holds this position."

== Criticism ==
Norman Geisler, a critic of open theism, addresses the claims that the Classical attributes were derived from the Greeks with three observations:

1. The quest for something unchanging is not bad.
2. The Greeks did not have the same concept of God.
3. Philosophical influences are not wrong in themselves.

An open theist might respond that all such criticisms are misplaced. As to observation (1), it is not characteristic of open theists to say that the quest for something unchanging is bad. Indeed, open theists believe God's character is unchanging. As to observation (2), open theists do not characteristically say traditional forms of classical theism have exactly the same concept of God as the Greeks. Rather, they argue that they imported only some unbiblical assumptions from the Greeks. They also point to theologians of the Christian tradition who, throughout history, did not succumb so strongly to Hellenistic influences. As to observation (3), open theists do not argue that philosophical influences are bad in themselves. Rather, they argue that some philosophical influences on Christian theology are unbiblical and theologically groundless. Consider John Sanders' statement in The Openness of God (1980):

Christian theology, I am arguing, needs to reevaluate classical theism in light of a more relational metaphysic (not all philosophy is bad!) so that the living, personal, responsive and loving God of the Bible may be spoken of more consistently in our theological reflection ...

Opponents of open theism, both Arminians, and Calvinists, such as John Piper, claim that the verses commonly used by open theists are anthropopathisms. They suggest that when God seems to change from action A to action B in response to prayer, action B was the inevitable event all along, and God divinely ordained human prayer as the means by which God actualized that course of events.

They also point to verses that suggest God is immutable, such as:

- Malachi 3:6: For I, the Lord, have not changed; and you, the sons of Jacob, have not reached the end. (Note: "For I, the Lord, have not changed": Although I keep back My anger for a long time, My mind has not changed from the way it was originally, to love evil and to hate good. — Rashi)
- Numbers 23:19: God is not a man that He should lie, nor is He a mortal that He should repent. Would He say and not do, speak and not fulfill? (Note: "God is not a man that He should lie": He has already promised them to bring them to and give them possession of the land of the seven nations, and you expect to kill them in the desert? — Rashi – [See Mid. Tanchuma Mass'ei 7, Num. Rabbah 23:8] – "Would He say ...": Heb. הַהוּא. This is in the form of a question. And the Targum (Onkelos) renders, "who later relent". They reconsider and change their minds.)
- 1 Samuel 15:29: And also, the Strength of Israel will neither lie nor repent, for He is not a man to repent."
- Isaiah 46:10: [I] tell the end from the beginning, and from before, what was not done; [I] say, "My counsel shall stand, and all My desire I will do."

Those advocating the traditional view see these as the verses that form God's character, and they interpret other verses that say God repents as anthropomorphistic. Authors who claim this can be traced back through Calvin, Luther, Aquinas, Ambrose, and Augustine. Open theists note that there seems to be an arbitrary distinction here between those verses which are merely anthropopathic and others which form God's character. They also note that the immediate sense of the passages addressing God's inalterability ought to be understood in the Hebrew sense of his faithfulness and justice. In other words, God's love and character is unchanging; this, however, demands that His approach to people (especially in the context of personal relationship) be flexible.

=== Literary debate ===
In the early 18th century, an extended public correspondence flourished around the topic of open theism. The debate was incited by Samuel Fancourt's 1727 publication, The Greatness of Divine Love Vindicated. Over the next decade, four other English writers published polemical works in response. This led Fancourt to defend his views in six other publications. In his 1747 autobiography, in response to some who thought that this controversy had affected his career, Fancourt wrote, "Should it be suggested, that my religious principles were a prejudice unto me—I answer: so are those of every Dissenting Protestant in the [United] Kingdom with some, if he dares to think and to speak what he thinks." Fancourt also names other writers who had supported his views.

In 2005, a "raging debate" among evangelicals about "open or free-will theism" was in place. This period of controversy began in 1994 with the publication of The Openness of God. (Note: Pinnock, Clark H.; Rice, Richard; Sanders, John (September 22, 1994). The Openness of God: A Biblical challenge to the traditional understanding of God. Inter Varsity Press, Academic. ISBN 978-0830818525. Note that this later book has the same short title as Rice (1980).) The debate between open and classical theists is illustrated by their books as in the following chart. (Note: Cited by Jowers: Risler, James. "Open Theism". The Internet Encyclopedia of Philosophy. University of Tennessee at Martin. ISSN 2161-0002 – via www.iep.utm.edu.)

Year	Open theism books and comments	Classical theism books and comments
1980	Rice, Richard (1980). The Openness of God: The relationship of divine foreknowledge and human free will. Nashville, Tennessee: Review & Herald. – Rice was the "pioneer of contemporary evangelical open theism."	Critical acclaim, but public mostly unaware of open theism; the controversy had not yet begun.
1989	Hasker, William (1989). God, Time, and Knowledge. Cornell Studies in the Philosophy of Religion. Ithaca, New York: Cornell University Press.	Critical acclaim, but public mostly unaware of open theism; the controversy had not yet begun.
1994	Pinnock, Clark; Rice, Richard; Sanders, John; Hasker, William; Bassinger, David (1994). The Openness of God. InterVarsity. – "ignited a firestorm of controversy".	"Provoked numerous hostile articles in academic and popular publications." The "conservative backlash" was "quick and fierce".
1996	Basinger, David (1996). The Case for Freewill Theism: A philosophical assessment. InterVarsity. – Considers divine omniscience, theodicy, and petitionary prayer in freewill perspective.	McGregor Wright, R. K. (1996). No Place for Sovereignty: What's wrong with freewill theism. InterVarsity. – Sees open theism as wrong biblically, theologically, and philosophically.
1997	Boyd, Gregory (1997). God at War: The Bible & spiritual conflict. InterVarsity. – Made open theism the centerpiece of a theodicy.	Geisler, Norman (1997). Creating God in the Image of Man?. Bethany. – Asserts that open theism should be called new theism or neotheism because it is so different from classical theism.
1998	Sanders, John (1998). The God who Risks: A theology of providence. InterVarsity. – "The most thorough standard presentation and defense of the openness view of God."	Erickson, Millard (1998). God the Father Almighty: A contemporary exploration of the Divine attributes. Baker. – Accuses open theists of selective use of Scripture and caricaturing classical theism.
2000	Pinnock, Clark (2000). Most Moved Mover: A theology of God's openness. Baker and Paternoster. – "The most passionate and articulate defense of openness theology to date." Boyd, Gregory (2000). God of the Possible: A Biblical introduction to the open view of God. Baker. – "A genuinely evangelical portrayal of the biblical God."	Ware, Bruce (2000). God's Lesser Glory: The diminished God of open theism. Crossway. – "The most influential critique of open theism."
2001	Boyd, Gregory A. (2001). Satan and the Problem of Evil: Constructing a trinitarian warfare theodicy. InterVarsity. – "A renewed defense of open theism" and a theodicy grounded in it.	Frame, John (2001). No Other God: A response to open theism. P & R. Geisler, Norman; House, Wayne; Herrera, Max (2001). The Battle for God: Responding to the challenge of neotheism. Kregel. – "Debate seemed to turn somewhat in favor of classical theism."
2002–2003	Boyd, Gregory A. (2003). Is God to Blame? Beyond pat answers to the problem of evil. InterVarsity. – Attacked classical theists as "blueprint theologians" espousing a "blueprint world view".	Huffman, Douglas; Johnson, Eric, eds. (2002). God under Fire: Modern scholarship reinvents God. Zondervan. Erickson, Millard (2003). What does God Know and When does He know it?: The current controversy over divine foreknowledge. Zondervan. – Attacked "open theism as theologically ruinous, dishonoring to God, belittling to Christ, and pastorally hurtful". Piper, John; Taylor, Justin; Helseth, Paul, eds. (2003). Beyond the Bounds: Open theism and the undermining of Biblical Christianity. Crossway.
2004–2012	Hasker, William (2004). Providence, Evil, and the Openness of God. Routledge Studies in the Philosophy of Religion. Routledge. – Contains appendix titled "Replies to my critics".	Branch, Craig, ed. (2012). "Open Theism: Making God like us". The Areopagus Journal. 4 (1). The Apologetics Resource Center. – Book's stated purpose is to "demonstrate the errors of open theism".
2013–2014	Ham, Garrett (2014). The Evangelical and the Open Theist: Can open theism find its place within the evangelical community?. Kindle. – Argues that proponents of open theism have a right to be called "evangelical".	Scott, Luis (2013). Frustrating God: How open theism gets God all wrong. Westbow. – Declares that "open theists get God all wrong".
present	The Internet brought open theists and their debate with classical theists into public view. – An internet site supporting open theism is "Open theism – a basic introduction". reknew.org. May 2014.	The Internet brought classical theists and their debate with open theists into public view. Two internet sites supporting classical theism (from the Calvinist perspective) are: "The foreknowledge of God". desiringgod.org. and "Open theism and divine-foreknowledge". frame-poythress.org. June 5, 2012.

== See also ==
- Arminianism
- David Basinger
- Gregory A. Boyd
- Robin Collins
- Conceptions of God
- Samuel Fancourt
- Terence E. Fretheim
- William Hasker
- Libertarianism (metaphysics)
- John Lucas (philosopher)
- Thomas Jay Oord
- Panentheism § Christianity
- Philosophical theology
- Philosophy of space and time
- Clark Pinnock
- John Polkinghorne
- Process theology
- Richard Rice (theologian)
- John E. Sanders
- Richard Swinburne
- Keith Ward
- Dean Zimmerman

== Sources ==
Pro

- Trinity and Process, G.Boyd, 1992
- "Satan & the Problem of Evil: Constructing a Trinitarian Warfare Theodicy", Greg Boyd (2001) ISBN 0-8308-1550-3
- The Case for Freewill Theism: a Philosophical Assessment, David Basinger, 1996, InterVarsity Press, ISBN 0-8308-1876-6
- The Openness of God: The Relationship of Divine Foreknowledge and Human Free Will, Richard Rice, 1980, Review and Herald Pub. Association, ISBN 0-8127-0303-0
- The Openness of God: A Biblical Challenge to the Traditional Understanding of God, Clark Pinnock editor, et al., 1994, InterVarsity Press ISBN 0-8308-1852-9, Paternoster Press (UK), ISBN 0-85364-635-X (followup to Rice book includes contribution from him)
- The God Who Risks: A Theology of Providence, John Sanders, revised edition, 2007. InterVarsity Press, ISBN 978-0-8308-2837-1
- The Nature of Love: A Theology, Thomas Jay Oord, 2010. Chalice Press, ISBN 978-0-8272-0828-5
- God, Time, and Knowledge, William Hasker, 1998, Cornell University Press, ISBN 0-8014-8545-2
- God of the Possible, Gregory A. Boyd, 2000 reprint, Baker Books, ISBN 0-8010-6290-X
- Most Moved Mover: A Theology of God's Openness (The Didsbury Lectures), Clark Pinnock, 2001, Baker Academic, ISBN 0-8010-2290-8
- Providence, Evil, and the Openness of God, William Hasker, 2004, Routledge, ISBN 0-415-32949-3
- Creation Made Free: Open Theology Engaging Science, Thomas Jay Oord ed., 2009, Pickwick, ISBN 978-1-60608-488-5

Con

- God's Lesser Glory, Bruce A. Ware, 2000, Crossway Books, ISBN 1-58134-229-2
- Still Sovereign: Contemporary Perspectives on Election, Foreknowledge, and Grace, Thomas R. Schreiner and Bruce A. Ware (editors), 2000, Baker Academic, ISBN 0-8010-2232-0
- Bound Only Once: The Failure of Open Theism, Douglas Wilson editor, et al., 2001, Canon Press, ISBN 1-885767-84-6
- No Other God: A Response to Open Theism, John M. Frame, P & R Publishing, 2001, ISBN 0-87552-185-1
- Consuming Glory: A Classical Defense of Divine-Human Relationality Against Open Theism, Gannon Murphy, Wipf & Stock, 2006, ISBN 1-59752-843-9
- Beyond the Bounds: Open Theism and the Undermining of Biblical Christianity, John Piper et al., 2003, Crossway Books, ISBN 1-58134-462-7
- What Does God Know and When Does He Know It?: The Current Controversy over Divine Foreknowledge, Millard J. Erickson, Zondervan, 2006, ISBN 0-310-27338-2
- How Much Does God Foreknow?: A Comprehensive Biblical Study, Steven C. Roy, InterVarsity Press, 2006, ISBN 0-8308-2759-5
- The Benefits of Providence: A New Look at Divine Sovereignty, James S. Spiegel, Crossway Books, 2005, ISBN 1-58134-616-6

Multiple views

- The Sovereignty of God Debate, D. Steven Long and George Kalantizis editors, 2009 Cascade Books, ISBN 978-1-55635-217-1
- Perspectives on the Doctrine of God: 4 Views, Bruce Ware editor, 2008, Broadman and Holman Academic, ISBN 978-0-8054-3060-8
- Divine Foreknowledge: 4 Views, James Beilby and Paul Eddy (editors), et al., 2001, InterVarsity Press, ISBN 0-8308-2652-1
- God and Time: Essays on the Divine Nature, Gregory E. Ganssle and David M. Woodruff (editors), 2002, Oxford University Press, ISBN 0-19-512965-2
- God & Time: Four Views, Gregory E. Ganssle (editor), et al., 2001, InterVarsity Press, ISBN 0-8308-1551-1
- Predestination & Free Will, David and Randall Basinger (editors), et al., 1985, Intervarsity Press, ISBN 0-87784-567-0
- Searching for an Adequate God, John Cobb and Clark Pinnock (Editors), et al., 2000, Wm. B. Eerdmans Publishing Company, ISBN 0-8028-4739-0
