= Richard Rice (theologian) =

American Seventh-day Adventist theologian

T. Richard Rice

Personal details
- Born: 1944 (age 81–82) Springfield, MA
- Occupation: Protestant, Seventh-day Adventist Theologian

Thomas Richard "Rick" Rice (born 1944) is an American, Seventh-day Adventist theologian and author. A leading proponent of "open theism", Rice is professor emeritus of theology and philosophy of religion at Loma Linda University in California.

== Biography ==
Rice received an M.Div. degree from Andrews University in 1969, and an MA and Ph.D. in Christian theology from the University of Chicago in 1972 and 1974, respectively. He taught at La Sierra University, in Riverside, California until 1998, moving then to Loma Linda University, where he was (until his retirement July 2020) a Professor of Religion in the areas of Theology and Philosophy of Religion. He has served as a church pastor.

== Open theism ==
Rice introduced the term "open theism" in his 1980 book The Openness of God: The Relationship of Divine Foreknowledge and Human Free Will. The book was published by Seventh-day Adventist publisher Review and Herald, but proved controversial within the church and was not reprinted. Later, evangelical Clark Pinnock contacted Rice to convey his deep appreciation of the book, and gave it a positive review. It was republished by Pinnock's publisher Bethany House under the title God's Foreknowledge & Man's Free Will. In 1994, Rice and other theologians contributed to the book The Openness of God: A Biblical Challenge to the Traditional Understanding of God, which was edited by Pinnock.

David Larson has claimed, "although it may seem new to some, in less detailed forms the basics of “Open Theism” have been taught at Loma Linda University for about fifty years [as of 2007], beginning at least as early as long-time professor Jack W. Provonsha."

== Publications ==
Rice has authored numerous books, and has published articles in the Journal of Religion, Religious Studies Review, Andrews University Seminary Studies, Ministry, Insight and Spectrum. His books include:

- When Bad Things Happen to God's People. Pacific Press. May 1985. p. 93. ISBN 0-8163-0570-6.
- Clark H. Pinnock (ed.), Richard Rice, John Sanders, William Hasker, David Basinger (October 1994). The Openness of God: A Biblical Challenge to the Traditional Understanding of God. InterVarsity Press. p. 202. ISBN 0-8308-1852-9.
- Reign of God: An Introduction to Christian Theology from a Seventh-day Adventist Perspective (2nd ed.). Andrews University Press. January 1997. p. 423. ISBN 1-883925-16-9.
- Believing, Behaving, Belonging: Finding New Love for the Church. Adventist Forum. 2002. p. 212. ISBN 978-0967369419.
- God's Foreknowledge and Man's Free Will. Wipf and Stock. 2004. p. 108. ISBN 978-1592446766.
- Reason and the Contours of Faith. Wipf and Stock. 2013. p. 310. ISBN 978-1625640840.
- Suffering and the Search for Meaning. InterVarsity Press. July 2014. p. 170. ISBN 978-0-8308-4037-3. Archived from the original on 2014-07-14.
- The Future of Open Theism: From Antecedents to Opportunities. InterVarsity Press. April 2020. p. 264. ISBN 978-0830852864.

== See also ==
- Open theism
- Progressive Adventism

Preceded by James Londis	President of the Adventist Society for Religious Studies; 1989	Succeeded by Russell Staples
