= Theistic personalism =

Philosophical conception of deity

Theistic personalism describes a family of views in the philosophy of religion that construe God as a personal agent whose personhood is understood in a univocal or near-univocal ontological sense with that of finite persons. These views are often contrasted with classical theism, which understands divine personhood analogically and affirms doctrines like divine simplicity, according to which God is not composed of parts and God's essence is identical with God's existence. A central characteristic of theistic personalism is the rejection of divine simplicity. Adherents often also reject or understand other classical divine attributes, such as immutability and impassibility, in ways that differ from classical theistic formulations.

The term, with its current meaning, was popularized by the British philosopher Brian Davies.

== See also ==
- Classical theism
- Divine simplicity
