= Causa sui =

Term that denotes something that is generated within itself

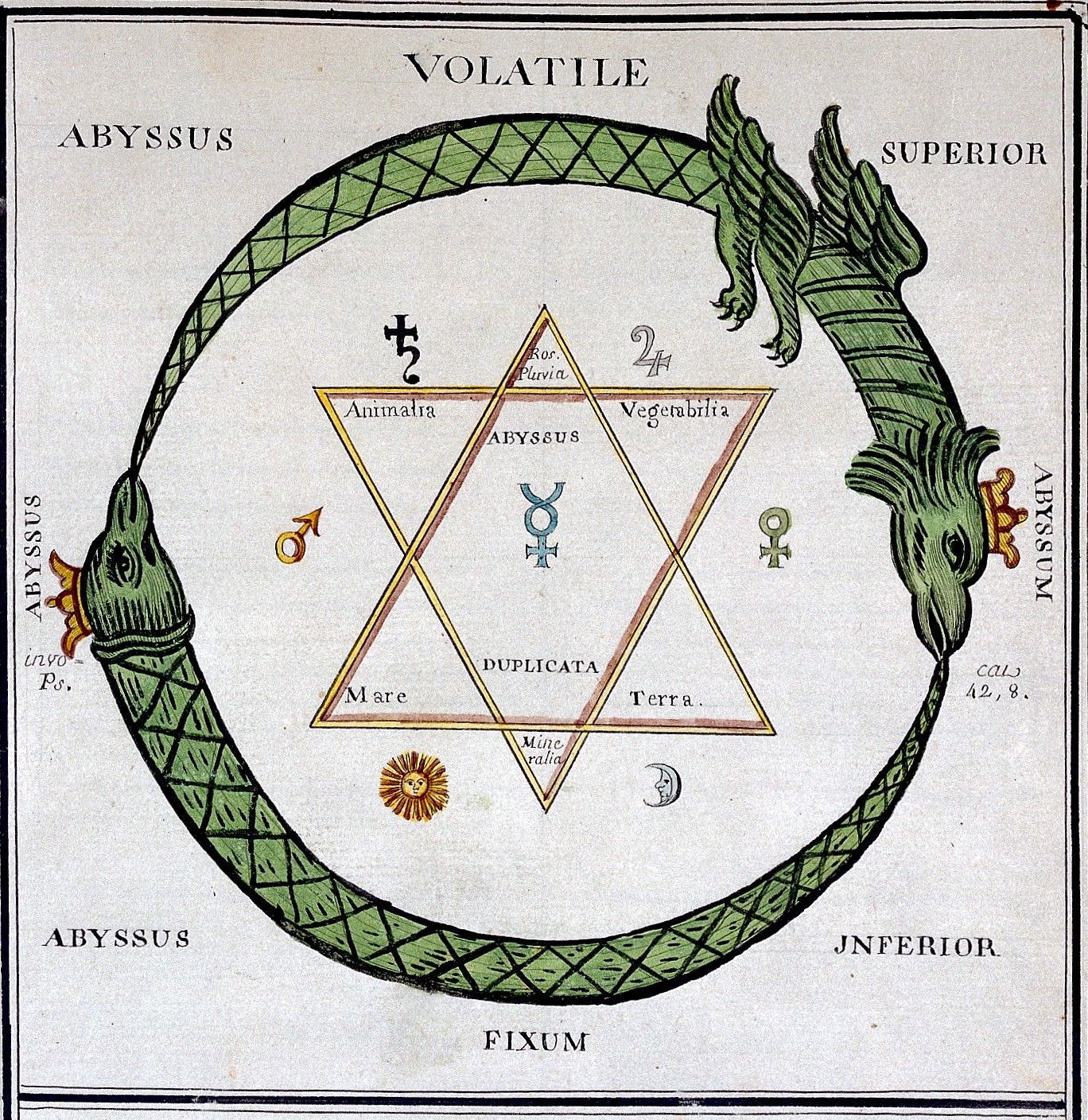

Causa sui (pronounced [ˈkau̯.sa ˈsʊ.iː]; transl. cause of itself, self-caused) is a Latin term that denotes something that is generated within itself. Used in relation to the purpose that objects can assign to themselves, the concept was central to the works of Baruch Spinoza, Sigmund Freud, Jean-Paul Sartre, and Ernest Becker.

== In social science ==
In Freud and Becker's case, the concept was often used as an immortality vessel, whereby something could create meaning, or continue to create meaning, beyond its own life.

Norman O. Brown, in his acclaimed Life Against Death, argues Freud's Oedipal complex is essentially the causa sui ("father-of-oneself") project, where, after the traumatic recognition that the subject is separate from the mother — that they are 'other' — they seek reunification with the mother.

== In theism ==
In traditional Western theism, even though God cannot be created by any other force or being, he cannot be defined as causa sui because such would imply the Spinozian pantheistic idea of 'becoming', which contrasts with the belief of scholastic theology that God is incapable of changing.

The Catholic concept of...God as absolutely independent and self-existent by nature, and, consequently, all-perfect without any possibility of change from all eternity, is altogether opposed to the pantheistic concept of absolute or pure being [that] evolves, determines, and realizes itself through all time.

Changing implies development, and since God is to be considered the Absolute Perfection, there is no further need to change: he is the so-called actus purus, or aseity. Instead, the recent process theology inserts this concept among the attributes of God in Christianity.

On the other hand, in the Japji Sahib, Guru Nanak (the founder of Sikhism) defined God as self-existent.

== See also ==
- Causality
- Agent causation
- Existentialism
- For-itself
- Immutability (theology)
- Primum movens
- Process theology
- Aseity
