= Theomorphism =

Position that change in the divine nature is possible

Theomorphism, from Greek θεος, theos (God) and μορφη, morphē (shape or form) is the early Christian heresy that states that change in the divine nature is possible. It is most commonly used to refer to the idea that the nature of God the Son changed at the moment of the Incarnation, so that he was no longer God. This opinion came about because of controversy about whether God the Son was capable of causing pain without a physical body.

Cyril, patriarch of Alexandria in the early fifth century, criticizes this belief in his letter to the Byzantine emperor Theodosius II concerning the heresies of the time. A related belief mentioned by Cyril as also being a form of Theomorphism is the idea that humanity can attain godhood, which he similarly condemns.

== See also ==
- Impassibility
- Open theism
- Process theology
