= Millard Erickson =

American theologian (born 1932)

Millard J. Erickson
- Born: June 24, 1932 (age 94); Isanti County, Minnesota
- Occupations: Pastor, Theologian
- Years active: 1963-present
- Notable work: Christian Theology, Truth or Consequences
- Theological work
- Era: Late 20th and early 21st centuries
- Language: English
- Tradition or movement: Evangelical

Millard J. Erickson (born 24 June 1932), born in Isanti County, Minnesota, is an Evangelical Christian theologian, professor of theology, and author.

== Early life and education ==
He earned a B.A. from the University of Minnesota, a B.D. from Northern Baptist Theological Seminary, an M.A. from the University of Chicago, and a Ph.D. from Northwestern University.

== Ministry ==
Erickson, an ordained Baptist minister, is a fairly conservative and moderately Calvinistic Evangelical Protestant. He is accommodating of non-mainstream views on a number of issues, but one of the most vocal opponents of theological liberalism and progressive trends within Evangelicalism. Erickson is a prominent critic of openness theology as well as postmodern Christianity, including the Emerging Church movement.

Erickson was Professor of Theology at Western Seminary in Portland, Oregon. He was professor of theology and academic dean at Bethel University seminary for many years. He also taught at Baylor University.

In 1998, a Festschrift was published in his honor. New Dimensions in Evangelical Thought : Essays in Honor of Millard J. Erickson included contributions from Timothy George, Stanley J. Grenz, Walter C. Kaiser, Jr., Alister E. McGrath, Roger Nicole, Wolfhart Pannenberg, Clark Pinnock, Thom S. Rainer, and Thomas R. Schreiner.

== Works ==
=== Books ===
- Erickson, Millard J. (1968), The New Evangelical Theology, Westwood, NJ: Revell, OCLC 439792
- ——— (1973), The Living God: readings in Christian theology, Grand Rapids, MI: Baker Books House, ISBN 978-0-801-03305-6, OCLC 822401
- ——— (1974), Relativism in Contemporary Christian Ethics, Grand Rapids, MI: Baker Books House, ISBN 978-0-801-03315-5, OCLC 995717
- ———, ed. (1976), Man's Need and God's Gift: readings in Christian theology, vol. 2, Grand Rapids, MI: Baker Books House, ISBN 978-0-801-03324-7, OCLC 3167657
- ——— (1977), Contemporary Options in Eschatology: a study of the millennium, Grand Rapids, MI: Baker Books House, ISBN 978-0-801-03262-2, OCLC 3641085
- ——— (1979), The New Life: readings in Christian theology, Grand Rapids, MI: Baker Books House, ISBN 978-0-801-03340-7, OCLC 5726461
- ——— (1986), Concise Dictionary of Christian Theology, Grand Rapids, MI: Baker Academic, ISBN 978-0-801-03436-7, OCLC 15059119
- ——— (1990), Christian theology (1st one volume ed.), Grand Rapids, MI: Baker Books House, ISBN 978-0-801-03433-6, OCLC 60133407
- ——— (2000), Making Sense of the Trinity: 3 crucial questions, Grand Rapids, MI: Baker Books House, ISBN 978-0-801-062872, OCLC 42812837
- ——— (1991), The Word Became Flesh, Grand Rapids, MI: Baker Books House, ISBN 978-0-801-03208-0, OCLC 24010337
- ——— (1993), Evangelical Interpretation: perspectives on hermeneutical issues, Grand Rapids, MI: Baker Books House, ISBN 978-0-801-03220-2, OCLC 27727162
- ——— (1994), Where is Theology Going?: issues and perspectives on the future of theology, Grand Rapids, MI: Baker Books House, ISBN 978-0-801-03224-0, OCLC 30111717
- ——— (1995), God in Three Persons: a contemporary interpretation of the Trinity, Grand Rapids, MI: Baker Books House, ISBN 978-0-801-03229-5, OCLC 31710360
- ——— (1997), The Evangelical Left: encountering postconservative Evangelical theology, Grand Rapids, MI: Baker Books House, ISBN 978-0-801-02140-4, OCLC 36186941
- ——— (1998), Postmodernizing the Faith: evangelical responses to the challenge of postmodernism, Grand Rapids, MI: Baker Books House, ISBN 978-0-801-02164-0, OCLC 37712935
- ——— (1998), God the Father Almighty: a contemporary exploration of the divine attributes, Grand Rapids, MI: Baker Books House, ISBN 978-0-801-01154-2, OCLC 38475171
- ——— (1998), A Basic Guide to Eschatology: making sense of the millennium, Grand Rapids, MI: Baker Books House, ISBN 978-0-801-05836-3, OCLC 40335314
- ——— (2001), Truth or Consequences: the promise & perils of postmodernism, Downers Grove, IL: InterVarsity Press, ISBN 978-0-830-82657-5, OCLC 47002142
- ——— (1998), Christian Theology (2nd ed.), Grand Rapids: Baker Academic, ISBN 978-0-801-02182-4
- ——— (1998), Basic Guide to Eschatology, Grand Rapids: Baker Books, ISBN 978-0-801-05836-3
- ——— (2001), Introducing Christian Doctrine, Grand Rapids: Baker Academic, ISBN 978-0-801-02250-0
- ——— (2001), Introducing Christian Doctrine, Downers Grove: InterVarsity Press, ISBN 978-0-8308-2657-5
- ———; Taylor, Justin; Helseth, Paul, eds. (2004), Reclaiming The Center, Wheaton: Crossway, ISBN 978-1-58134-568-1
- ——— (2006), What Does God Know And When Does He Know It: The Current Controversy Over Divine Foreknowledge, Grand Rapids: Zondervan, ISBN 978-0-310-27338-7
- ——— (2009), Who's Tampering With the Trinity?, Grand Rapids: Kregel Academic, ISBN 978-0-8254-2589-9
- ——— (2013), Christian Theology (3rd ed.), Grand Rapids: Baker Academic, ISBN 978-0-801-02182-4

=== Articles and Chapters ===
- ——— (1982). "Biblical Inerrancy: The Last Twenty-five Years". Journal of the Evangelical Theological Society. 25 (4): 387–94.
- ——— (1985). "Principles, Permanence and the Future Divine Judgment: A Case Study in Theological Method". Journal of the Evangelical Theological Society. 28 (3): 317–25.
- ——— (1986), "Doctrine, Preaching and the Preacher", in Magnuson, Norris (ed.), Proclaim the Good News: Essays in Honor of Gordon G. Johnson, Arlington Heights, IL: Harvest, pp. 43–57
- ——— (1991). "Christology from an Evangelical Perspective". Review and Expositor. 88 (4): 379–97. doi:10.1177/003463739108800405. S2CID 147379782.
- ——— (1995). "Is There Opportunity for Salvation After Death?". Bibliotheca Sacra. 152 (19): 131–44.
- _____ (2017). "Language, Logic, and Trinity: A Critical Examination of the Eternal Subordinationist View of the Trinity". Priscilla Papers. 31 (3): 8–15.
