= Aseity =

Attribute of God in Christian theology

Aseity (from Latin a "from" and se "self", plus -ity) (self-existence, self-causation, self-causality and autocausality) is the property by which a being exists of and from itself.

It usually refers to the monotheistic belief that God does not depend on any cause other than himself for his existence, realization, or end, and has within himself his own reason of existence. This represents God as absolutely independent and self-existent by nature.

While commonly discussed in Christian theology, many Jewish and Muslim theologians have also believed God to be independent in this way. This quality of independence and self-existence has been affirmed under various names by theologians going back to antiquity, though the use of the word 'aseity' began only in the Middle Ages.

== Meaning ==
Aseity has two aspects, one negative and one positive: absolute independence and self-existence. W. N. Clarke writes:

In its negative meaning, which emerged first in the history of thought, it [aseity] affirms that God is uncaused, depending on no other being for the source of His existence. In its positive meaning, it affirms that God is completely self-sufficient, having within Himself the sufficient reason for His own existence.

The first concept derives from "the God of philosophers" (a concept first described by Xenophanes), while the second one derives from "the living God of Revelation" (I Am Who I Am: Exodus 3:14).

As a part of this belief, an aseitous God is said to be incapable of changing (see Hebrews 13:8). Changing implies development. Since God was, and is, and is to be the Absolute Perfection, there is no need to change: he is αὐτουσία (unchanged: Gregory of Nyssa), actus purus and ipsum esse subsistens (Thomas Aquinas).

Many (Thomas Aquinas, for instance) have also thought that aseity implies divine simplicity: that God has no parts of any kind (whether spatial, temporal, or abstract), since complexes depend on their individual parts, with none of which they are identical. Classical theists have often drawn a further implication: that God is without emotion or is "impassible". This is because, it is said, emotion implies standing as patient (pass-) to some agent – i.e., dependence. This is so because, although God has created everything, he is not dependent on his creation.

== Philosophical considerations ==
Whether this being should be described as God turns on whether the label 'Creator' is a rigid designator of God. Given that most theists believe all that is not God to be brought about by God, and that many (for example, St. Thomas Aquinas) argue from the non-aseity of the universe to the existence of God, this problem is highly theoretical. There is also a possible threat to divine aseity by the existence of abstract objects, a threat that philosopher William Lane Craig attempts to provide reconciliations for in his book, God Over All. John 1:3 states that "All things came into being through him, and without him not one thing came into being". The aorist tense implies that everything that exists (other than God) came into being at some time in the past. This verse carries the weighty metaphysical implication that there are no eternal entities apart from God, eternal either in the sense of existing atemporally or of existing sempiternally. Rather everything that exists, except God Himself, is the product of temporal becoming.

Aseity has also been criticized as logically incompatible with the concept of God as a being or with God as existing. Furthermore, it can be argued that for the notion of aseity not to be logically circular or inconsistent, the supposed entity to which it applies would have to be identified with its properties, instead of instantiating, exemplifying or having its properties, and would therefore be a nonsentient force or potential of indeterminate vitality (see monad). This seems to contradict the notion that God is a person or a causal agent, for persons or agents are not properties (or complexes of properties). Schopenhauer attributes Aseity (self-dependent) to will, as the only being by and of itself, apart from causal relationships.

== See also ==
- Actus purus
- Altruism
- Anatta
- Causa sui
- Gnosiology
- Hypostasis (philosophy)
- Ousia
- Ontology
- Martin Heidegger
- Solipsism
- Svayambhu

== Bibliography ==
- Alston, William P. "Hartshorne and Aquinas: A Via Media", in Divine Nature and Human Language. Ithaca, NY: Cornell University Press, 1989.
- Hartshorne, Charles. The Divine Relativity: A Social Conception of God. New Haven, CT: Yale University Press, 1948.
- Morris, Thomas V. Our Idea of God. Chap. 6. Downer's Grove, Illinois: InterVarsity Press, 1991.
- Thomas Aquinas. Summa Theologica, I, Q. 3. Many editions.
