= David Basinger =

American philosopher

David Basinger (/ˈbeɪsɪŋər/) is professor of philosophy at Roberts Wesleyan College, Rochester, New York. He is also the vice president for academic affairs and the chief academic officer at Roberts Wesleyan College. Basinger graduated from Grace College, Bellevue College, and University of Nebraska–Lincoln, with an MA and PhD. He is a proponent of open theism.

== Works ==
- Divine power in process theism: a philosophical critique. SUNY Press. 1988. ISBN 978-0-88706-708-2.
- Reason and Religious Belief: An Introduction to the Philosophy of Religion, 3rd edition (New York: Oxford Press, 2003).
- “Theodicy: A Comparative Analysis” in Semper Reformandum: Studies in Honour of Clark Pinnock, eds., Stanley Porter and Anthony Cross (Crumbia, UK: Paternoster Press, 2003)
- Religious Diversity: A Philosophical Assessment (Ashgate Press, 2002) ISBN 978-0-7546-1521-7.
- The Case For Freewill Theism. InterVarsity Press. 1996. ISBN 978-0-8308-1876-1.
- David Basinger; Randall Basinger, eds. (1986). Predestination & free will: four views of divine sovereignty & human freedom. InterVarsity Press. ISBN 978-0-87784-567-6.
- James Kraft; David Basinger, eds. (2008). Religious tolerance through humility: thinking with Philip Quinn. Ashgate Publishing, Ltd. ISBN 978-0-7546-6102-3.
