= Inclusivism =

Belief that many different sets of beliefs are true

Inclusivism is one of several approaches in dialectical materialism, totalitarianism, religious studies, anthropology, or civics to understand the relationship between different religions, societies, cultures, political factions etc. It asserts that there is beauty in the variety of different schools of thoughts, and that they can coexist. It stands in contrast to exclusivism, which asserts that only one way is true and all others are erroneous.

Within religious studies and theology, inclusivism is the belief that, although only one belief system is true, aspects of its truth can be found in other religions. This is contrasted from religious pluralism, which asserts that all beliefs are equally valid within a believer's particular context.

== Typology ==
Broadly speaking, there are two schools of Inclusivist thought:

- Relativistic inclusivism, which asserts that the believer's own views are true only in their particular context, and believers of other traditions have their own validity.
- Absolutist inclusivism, which asserts that an unknown set of assertions are Absolutely True, that no human being currently living has yet ascertained absolute truth, but that all human beings have partially ascertained absolute truth.
  - Classical inclusivism is a form of absolutist inclusivism, as it asserts that the own faith tradition contains the (to currently living human-beings not yet fully understandable) truth, yet other faith traditions or religions can be partially true.

== By religion ==
=== Ancient Greece ===
Interpretatio graeca was the tendency of ancient Greek writers to equate foreign divinities to members of their own pantheon. Herodotus, for example, refers to the ancient Egyptian gods Amon, Osiris, and Ptah as "Zeus," "Dionysus," and "Hephaestus," respectively. This could be seen as an example of inclusivism as well as syncretism.

Syncretism functioned as an essential feature of Ancient Greek religion. Later on, Hellenism, a consequence of Alexander the Great's belief that he was the son of a god, reinforced by the Oracle of Zeus-Ammon at Siwa in Egypt, itself showed syncretic features, essentially blending Persian, Anatolian, Egyptian (and eventually Etruscan-Roman) elements within Hellenic formulations. After the Hellenization of the Egyptian culture initiated by Ptolemy I Soter, Isis became known as "Queen of Heaven" and was worshipped in many aspects and by many names besides that of Hera.

=== Hinduism ===
A well-known hymn in the Hindu Rigveda claims that "Truth is One, though the sages know it variously", proclaiming a pluralistic view of religion. Krishna, an Avatar of Vishnu, the supreme deity in Vaishnavism, said in the Gita, "In whatever way men identify with Me, in the same way do I carry out their desires; men pursue My path... in all ways" (Gita 4:11). He also said that "Whatever deity or form a devotee worships, I make his faith steady. However, their wishes are only granted by Me" (Gita 7:21–22). Another quote in the Gita states: "O Arjuna, even those devotees who worship other lesser deities (e.g., Devas, for example) with faith, they also worship Me, but in an improper way because I am the Supreme Being. I alone am the enjoyer of all sacrificial services (Seva, Yajna) and Lord of the universe" (Gita 9:23).

=== Christianity ===
Inclusive Christianity, also called inclusive theology, is an interpretation of the Bible that maintains that God desires and has the power to save individuals irrespective of the tradition in which they are born. Some Christian supporters of the inclusive view make a distinction between Christians and believers in maintaining that all Christians are believers. However, not all believers are Christians. In this line of thought, Christians are believers in the universal truth and follow and confess it under the biblical name "Jesus Christ". At the same time, they argue, some non-Christian believers of other religions, traditions, and disciplines would partially trust in the same one and only truth but under a different linguistic name. Inclusive Christians support these claims by citing certain passages from the Bible. Inclusive theology is rooted in a wider movement called "interfaith" that aims to create unity among various religions. The inclusive interpretation is a minority view in some churches but is considered an official theological doctrine in others.

Christian supporters of inclusivism include Augustus Hopkins Strong, C. S. Lewis, Clark Pinnock, Karl Rahner, John E. Sanders, Terrance L. Tiessen, and Robert Brush (contributor to The Arminian Magazine). While Billy Graham mostly preached "salvation by faith in Christ alone" throughout his 60-year ministry as an evangelist, he later made controversial comments that bordered on inclusivism. He stated that he did not like to refer to it by that term because he was concerned that many people mean universalism when they refer to inclusivism. Graham said, "I used to play God but I can’t do that any more. I used to believe that pagans in far-off countries were lost and were going to Hell—if they did not have the Gospel of Jesus Christ preached to them. I no longer believe that," he said carefully. "I believe that there are other ways of recognizing the existence of God—through nature, for instance—and plenty of other opportunities, therefore, of saying ’yes’ to God." Nikolaos Tsirevelos is an orthodox scholar who—together with the christian scholar Blerta Baba—states that the Holy Spirit can be active in a variety of religions and cultures as well as that there can be deep wisdom about God hidden in other religious traditions.

Biblical verses and passages associated with inclusivism: Some Evangelical and Reformed Protestant scholars believe that God judges all people based on their response to the Holy Spirit, citing Romans 2:14–15 as evidence that those following a natural moral law are still following God. (Note: Davies and Allison wrote: Rather did he hold the position stated in the Apocalypse of Sedrach: 'there are nations which have no law, yet fulfill the law; they are not baptized, but my divine Spirit enters them and they are converted to my baptism, and I receive them with my righteous ones in the bosom of Abraham. [There were rabbis who taught that righteous heathen would be saved: t. Sanh. 13.2; b. Sanh. 105a. Recall also Paul's thoughts in [Rom 2.14-16: Gentiles who do the law written on their hearts may have good consciences on the last day.] The context, however, does not explicitly teach two judgements; and we are not persuaded that 'the least' are to be identified with Christians (see below). Further, we have little doubt before Matthew, the scene concerned all humanity. At the same time, 25.31-46 may very well imply that Matthew thought salvation possible for those outside the church. We are reminded of Karl Rahner's so-called 'anonymous Christian'.) Some interpret this text more inclusively, suggesting that non-Christians also inherently possess a part of God's wisdom in their hearts as an integral aspect of who they are. They interpret Genesis 20:9–11 and 1 Corinthians 5:1 to illustrate that there are non-Christians or non-Jews who, guided by their inherent understanding of God's law, may lead lives that are more pleasing to God than those of some Jews and Christians. By Romans 1:19–20, inclusive Christians often argue that this description would imply that God—in parts—can be recognized by any human being, no matter their religion or cultural background, as well as independent from its geographic and/or its chronologic whereabouts. This would also include the domain of modern science as it studies the universe, as implied in Psalm 19:2–5. Other verses cited as supporting inclusivism include Acts 17:23–28, wherein Paul says that the (pagan) Greeks had been worshiping God without knowing it and that their poets have partially recognized the true nature of God. Inclusive Christians from various denominations argue that Colossians 1:16 suggests the universe, in its creatureliness, is part of God's being and integral to the eternal reality of the Christ. Another Christian Biblical proof text inclusive believers use is Acts 10:1–48, which would state that whoever fears God and does good works is accepted by him, regardless of nation. In addition, the Parable of the Sheep and the Goats (Matthew 25:31–46) portrays the judgment of the nations as being based on each individual's compassion toward others, not on their religious background. It is often argued that the connection between the biblical verses in Genesis 2:7 and Genesis 7:21-22 serves as strong evidence that every living organism contains essential elements of the living God within itself, specifically through the breath of God.

Inclusive interpretations of the Christian Bible, as understood by many inclusive Christians, suggest that God can be experienced in other religions and disciplines, such as science. However, these interpretations typically emphasize that to experience a deep and intimate relationship with God, connecting with the person of Jesus and acknowledging the reality of the Logos is essential. Furthermore, they assert that a complete relationship with God involves recognizing Jesus's and God's inclusive and universal nature. This encompasses a personal relationship with Jesus and an understanding of the broader, inclusive concept of divinity.

The doctrine of inclusivism is held by Unitarian Universalism, a liberal religion with Christian origins, some Roman Catholics and Seventh-day Adventists, asserting that while Christianity is the "one true faith", other faiths are at least partially true.

An alternative use for the term "inclusive theology" has to do with a movement called feminist theology, which aims to include more women in religious clergy roles that have been historically unavailable to women.

From an inclusive theological perspective, it is believed that a faith community can nurture the development of corresponding religious, spiritual, ecclesiastical, and interdisciplinary institutions. Examples of these are the Pontifical Academy of Sciences, the Pontifical Council for Culture, or the Dicastery for Interreligious Dialogue. In all Catholic Church institutions, relationships with other disciplines and religions are nurtured due to the Bible's fundamental inclusivist theological understanding.

=== Baháʼí Faith ===
Shoghi Effendi, the head of the Baháʼí Faith in the first half of the 20th century, stated:

The fundamental principle enunciated by Bahá'u'lláh, the followers of His Faith firmly believe, is that religious truth is not absolute but relative, that Divine Revelation is a continuous and progressive process, that all the great religions of the world are divine in origin, that their basic principles are in complete harmony, that their aims and purposes are one and the same, that their teachings are but facets of one truth, that their functions are complementary, that they differ only in the nonessential aspects of their doctrines, and that their missions represent successive stages in the spiritual evolution of human society.

== See also ==
- Ger toshav
- Pope John Paul II's Catechism of the Catholic Church on Islam
- Anonymous Christian
- Ecumenism
