= Anthropopathism =

Attribution of human emotions to a deity

Anthropopathism (from Greek ἄνθρωπος anthropos, "human" and πάθος pathos, "suffering") is the attribution of human emotions, or the ascription of human feelings or passions to a non-human being, generally to a deity.

By comparison, the term anthropomorphism originally referred to the attribution of human form to a non-human being, but in modern usage anthropomorphism has come to encompass both meanings.

== Religion ==
This is a technique prevalent in religious writings, where, for instance, human emotion is attributed to God, where he would not normally experience emotion in this sense. Anthropopathism existed in the ancient Semitic religion and early Islam. This technique is also used in the book of Genesis, as an example of the theme of God as a personal god.

== See also ==
- Frankenstein complex
- Pathetic fallacy
- Philo's view of God
- Theopaschism
