= Thomas Jay Oord =

American philosopher (born 1965)

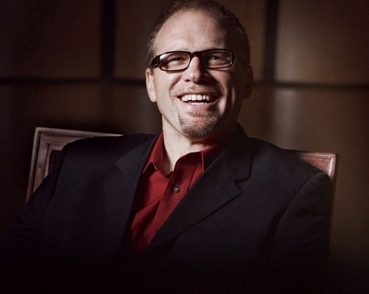
- Born: November 10, 1965 (age 60); Othello, Washington

Ecclesiastical career
- Religion: Christianity

Academic background
- Education: Northwest Nazarene College; Nazarene Theological Seminary; Claremont Graduate University
- Doctoral advisor: David Ray Griffin

Academic work
- Discipline: Philosophy; theology
- School or tradition: Open theism Open and Relational Theology
- Institutions: Northwest Nazarene University
- Website: thomasjayoord.com

Thomas Jay Oord (born 1965) is a theologian, philosopher, and multidisciplinary scholar who directs doctoral programs in Open and Relational Theology at Northwind Theological Seminary and directs the Center for Open and Relational Theology. He formerly taught for sixteen years as a tenured professor at Northwest Nazarene University in Nampa, Idaho, and as a philosophy professor at Eastern Nazarene College in Quincy, Massachusetts. Oord is the author or editor of more than thirty books and hundreds of articles. He is known for his contributions to research on love, open theism, process theism, open and relational theology, postmodernism, queer theology, the relationship between religion and science, Wesleyan, holiness, and LGBTQ+ advocacy.

== Early life and education ==
Born on November 10, 1965, and raised in Othello, Washington, Oord went from high school to attend Northwest Nazarene College (NNU), graduating in 1988. After serving as an associate pastor for several years in a church in Walla Walla, Washington, he enrolled at Nazarene Theological Seminary, graduating with a Master of Divinity. While in seminary, he was an associate pastor in Lenexa, Kansas. Oord then attended Claremont Graduate University, earning an MA and PhD in religion in 1999. While at Claremont, Oord was an associate pastor at the Bridge Church of the Nazarene in Bloomington, California. He then taught at Eastern Nazarene College before returning to his alma mater, Northwest Nazarene. As of 2020, Oord directs doctoral programs in Open and Relational Theology at Northwind Theological Seminary Northwind Theological Seminary.

== Thought ==
=== Creation ===
He argues that Christians should abandon the doctrine of creation ex nihilo. Oord points to the work of biblical scholars such as Jon D. Levenson, who points out that the doctrine of creatio ex nihilo does not appear in Genesis. Oord speculates that God created our particular universe billions of years ago from primordial chaos. This chaos, however, did not predate God, for God would have created the chaotic elements as well. Oord suggests that God can create all things without creating from absolute nothingness.

Oord offers nine objections to creatio ex nihilo:

1. Theoretical problem: One cannot conceive absolute nothingness.
2. Biblical problem: Scripture – in Genesis, 2 Peter, and elsewhere – suggests creation from something (water, deep, chaos, etc.), not creation from absolutely nothing.
3. Historical problem: The Gnostics Basilides and Valentinus first proposed creatio ex nihilo on the basis of assuming the inherently evil nature of creation, and in the belief that God does not act in history. Early Christian theologians adopted the idea to affirm the kind of absolute divine power that many Christians now reject.
4. Empirical problem: We have no evidence that our universe originally came into being from absolutely nothing.
5. Creation-at-an-instant problem: We have no evidence in the history of the Universe after the Big Bang that entities can emerge instantaneously from absolute nothingness. As the earliest philosophers noted, out of nothing comes nothing (ex nihilo, nihil fit).
6. Solitary power problem: Creatio ex nihilo assumes that a powerful God once acted alone. But power, as a social concept, only becomes meaningful in relation to others.
7. Errant revelation problem: The God with the capacity to create something from absolutely nothing would apparently have the power to guarantee an unambiguous and inerrant message of salvation (for example: inerrant Bible). An unambiguously clear and inerrant divine revelation does not exist.
8. Problem of Evil: If God once had the power to create from absolutely nothing, God essentially retains that power. But a God of love with this capacity appears culpable for failing to prevent evil.
9. Empire Problem: The kind of divine power implied in creatio ex nihilo supports a 'theology of empire', based upon unilateral force and control of others.

== Northwest Nazarene University employment ==
Oord was a tenured professor at NNU, where he had taught since 2002. He was asked to resign by the new president of NNU in 2014 before learning that he would be laid off at the end of the 2014–2015 school year. The reason cited by the president was declining enrollment in the theology program, but it was clear to other faculty and alumni that he was being dismissed because of theological positions that are not in the mainstream of the Nazarene culture, although compatible with the Wesleyan theological tradition. The president received a no-confidence vote of 77 percent in 2015 and then resigned, leaving Oord employed at a lower status and pay scale. A negotiated settlement and parting of ways was finally put into effect in 2018.

== Personal life ==
Oord is married and the couple has three daughters, and two grandchildren. He was an ordained elder within the Church of the Nazarene. In July 2024 he was defrocked and removed from membership after speaking out in favour of LGBT+ inclusion. He has often called this his "excommunication", despite not being barred from the sacraments nor attendance of Nazarene churches.

Oord has been an occasional blogger. His writing addresses issues in popular culture, the academy, and the church.

== Selected bibliography ==
- My Defense: Responding to Charges I Fully Affirm LGBTQ+ People (2024) ISBN 978-1958670460
- God After Deconstruction (2024) ISBN 978-1958670262
- The Death of Omnipotence and Birth of Amipotence (2023) ISBN 978-1948609913
- Pluriform Love: An Open and Relational Theology of Well-Being (2022) ISBN 978-1948609579
- Open and Relational Theology: An Introduction to Life-Changing Ideas (2021) ISBN 978-1948609371
- Questions and Answers for God Can't (2020) ISBN 978-1948609319
- God Can't: How to Believe in God and Love After Tragedy, Abuse, and Other Evils (2019) ISBN 978-1948609128
- The Uncontrolling Love of God: An Open and Relational Account of Providence (2015) 978-0830840847
- Defining Love: A Philosophical, Scientific, and Theological Engagement (2010) ISBN 1-58743-257-9
- The Nature of Love: A Theology (2010) ISBN 978-0-8272-0828-5
- The Best News You Will Ever Hear (with Robert Luhn) (2011) ISBN 978-0-9829300-5-2
- The Many Facets of Love: Philosophical Perspectives (2007) ISBN 978-1-84718-123-7
- Relational Holiness: Responding to the Call of Love (with Michael Lodahl) (2005) ISBN 978-0-8341-2182-9
- Science of Love: The Wisdom of Well-Being (2004) ISBN 978-1-932031-70-6
- Matching Theology and Piety (1999)

As editor and contributor:

- Open and Relational Theology and its Social and Political Implications: Muslim and Christian Perspectives (with Jonathan Foster, Manuel Schmid, Mouhanad Khorchide (2023) ISBN 978-1958670125
- Why the Church of the Nazarene Should Be Fully LGBTQ+ Affirming (2023) (with Alexa Oord) ISBN 978-1948609968
- Love Does Not Control: Therapists, Psychologists, and Counselors Explore Uncontrolling Love (with Annie DeRolf, Christy Gunter, John Loppnow, and Lon Marshall) (2023) ISBN 978-1948609852
- The Thomas Jay Oord Sampler (2022) ISBN 978-1948609661
- Partnering with God: Collaboration in Open and Relational Theology (with Tim Reddish, Bonnie Rambob, and Fran Stedman) (2021)
- Open and Relational Leadership: Leading with Love (with Sheri Kling and Roland Hearn) (2020)
- Women Experiencing Faith (with Janel Apps Ramsey) (2018)
- Rethinking the Bible (with Richard Thompson) (2018)
- Theologians and Philosophers Using Social Media: Advice, Tips, and Testimonials (2017)
- Theologies of Creation: Creatio ex Nihilo and Its New Rivals (2015) 978-0415712156
- Renovating Holiness (with Joshua Broward) (2015) B00TKNDUKK
- Nazarenes Exploring Evolution (with Sherri Walker) (2014)
- Relational Theology: A Contemporary Introduction (with Brint Montgomery and Karen Winslow) (2012)
- God in an Open Universe: Science, Metaphysics, and Open Theism (with William Hasker and Dean Zimmerman) (2011)
- The Bible Tells Me So (with Richard Thompson) (2011)
- The Polkinghorne Reader (2010)
- Creation Made Free: Open Theology Engaging Science (2009)
- Love Among Us (with Darrin Grinder) (2009)
- Divine Grace and Emerging Creation: Wesleyan Forays in Science and Theology of Creation (2009)
- Postmodern and Wesleyan? Exploring the Boundaries and Possibilities (with Jay Akkerman and Brent Peterson) (2009) ISBN 978-0-8341-2458-5
- The Altruism Reader: Selections from Writings on Love, Religion, and Science (2007) ISBN 978-1-59947-127-3
- Philosophy of Religion: Essay Introductions (2003) ISBN 978-0-8341-1995-6
- Thy Name and Thy Nature is Love (with Bryan P. Stone) (2001) ISBN 978-0-687-05220-2
- Generation Xers Talk about the Church of the Nazarene (1999) ISBN 978-0-8341-1815-7

Photography

- Through Both Creations Shine (2015) ISBN 978-1320890663

== See also ==
- American philosophy – Corpus of philosophers of the United States
- Altruism – Concern for the well-being of others
- Creatio ex nihilo – Doctrine that matter was created from nothing
- Impassibility – Theological doctrine
- Relationship between religion and science
- Theistic evolution – Scientific view of guided evolution by God
