= Eternity of God in Christianity =

Eternity is an important concept in Christian conceptions of God, who is typically argued to be eternally existent. How this is understood depends on which definition of eternity is used. God can exist in eternity or outside the human concept of time, but also inside of time.

== Definition ==
In William Rowe's review of Nelson Pike's God and Timelessness the two common definitions of eternity are given. The first is timelessness, which could be described as a timeless existence where categories of past, present, and future just do not apply. The second definition is of God existing in all time dimensions such as past, present, and future. In this case, God would have already existed for an infinite amount of time and will continue to do so. Pike mainly wonders if God could be timeless and all knowing. He argues that if God knows all, then he will know what a person will do in the future and that will be the only thing they can do because that's what God knows will happen, so there's only one option. But, Rowe argues, if God is timeless then he would not know what that person is planning to do before they do it, so therefore he could not be all knowing if he is timeless but if he is all knowing he could not be timeless. Rowe mentions how Pike uses multiple arguments to disprove Anselm of Canterbury and another theologian of their own arguments about why God is eternal (Anselm was a theist who believed God was all knowing and eternal).

Stewart Sutherland also talks about similar perspectives regarding the definition of God's eternity. Sutherland agrees with Nelson's Pikes conclusion that the two common definitions of eternity are defined as timelessness which could be described as a timeless existence where categories of past, present, and future just do not apply. The second definition is of God existing in all time dimensions such as past, present, and future. However, it has been argued that if God is timeless then he cannot be omniscient, because there are many things which a timeless being cannot know. Therefore, God could not know what is happening now, what will happen tomorrow, or what happened yesterday. If this argument is true, it would seem to eliminate the idea of God's foreknowledge, and this will have the advantage that it avoids at least some of the difficulties of the compatibility of belief in God and belief that, in some sense at least, the future actions of human beings are free.

Another perspective is offered from Lawrence Lafleur in his article, "If God Were Eternal". Lafleur believes if God was eternal, he could not be within time at all, he would have to be outside of it. He follows up with the argument that if God is outside of time, he could not interact with us since he would need some sort of access to the present to have a relationship with us. Thus, argues Lafleur, God would have no religious significance to us if he was eternal because then he would not have any connection or hand in our fate. Another argument Lafleur uses is that if God is all knowing, praying and worship is pointless because God already knows because he has conceived the whole world and all of us. According to Lafleur, when we say eternal, what we really mean is everlasting. Only in this way could God be everything we think of him as, both everlasting and all knowing.

The Bible is less clear on which of the two senses is true. The first sense, and perhaps the one with the longest pedigree, is that God exists independently of time. On this view, it cannot be said that God has lived for a certain number of years or will live a certain number of years into the future. The second notion is to say that God is in time but everlasting. This is sometimes called sempiternity. Both conceptions agree that God's existence never ends. They disagree on whether God is in time or outside of it.

John Feinberg, in his book No One Like Him argues for God's omnitemporality over his timelessness. Although agreeing with William Lane Craig that the biblical data are compatible with both views, Feinberg believes that it is easier to make sense of the notion of omnitemporality over atemporal eternity. Feinberg finds it difficult to believe that an omniscient, supremely rational being could know everything there is to know without being temporal. He also believes that the concept of fellowship is easier to understand on the omnitemporal model. Scripture also points to God as having fellowship with and interacting with human beings at various points in their lives, which seems difficult to understand unless there is a temporal sequence in God's thought life. Regardless, Feinberg affirms that both views are fully theologically orthodox, and that divine timelessness does have the advantage of not potentially slipping into the heretical notion of process theology.

== Christian doctrine ==
There are many ideas about the true definition of eternality, especially in different religions such as Judaism or Islam. D. P. Walker's research specifically focuses on the definition of eternity in the Christian doctrine. In his article “Eternity and the Afterlife”, he states that the Christian eternity combines two notions: non-successive experience and infinite duration. This Christian conception of eternity, formulated by Augustine of Hippo, Boethius, and Thomas Aquinas, is usually said to derive from Plato and the Neoplatonists.

== See also ==
- Absolute
- Attributes of God in Christianity
- Theistic finitism
- Ultimate reality
