= Sovereignty of God in Christianity =

Concept in Christian theology

Sovereignty of God in Christianity can be defined as the right of God to exercise his ruling power over his creation. Sovereignty can also include the way God exercises his ruling power. However, this aspect is subject to divergences notably related to the concept of God's self-imposed limitations. The correlation between God's sovereignty and human free will is a central theme in discussions about the meaningful nature of human choice.

== Definition ==
God's sovereignty in Christianity can be defined as the right of God to exercise his ruling power over his creation. The way in which God exercises his power is subject to differing views.

Calvinists generally see God's exercise of power as an intrinsic and inseparable part of his sovereignty. Other Christians may either understand this exercise of power as part of sovereignty or treat it separately under the idea of divine providence.

The sovereignty of God must be distinguished from God's eternal attributes. For example, God's omnipotence is his quality of having unlimited power. This attribute is not contingent upon something else other than God himself, and is therefore one of his eternal attributes. God's sovereignty, as the right to exercise his ruling power over his creation, is contingent upon his creation. God's sovereignty only takes effect once creation exists for it to be expressed upon. If the sovereignty of God is considered one of his attributes, it is a temporal one. God's sovereignty should then be seen as his right to express his eternal attribute of omnipotence over his creation qualified by his other eternal attributes such as omnibenevolence and omniscience.

== Historical developments ==
Throughout history, Christian theologians have advocated for a free-will theodicy. Besides, the question whether God's way of expressing his sovereignty is consistent with meaningful human decisions which are free from compulsion is a significant theological question in Christianity. The debate on this question was first clearly expressed by Augustine of Hippo in the 4th century. The debate has continued through various forms notably through the Calvinist-Arminian debate until today. Theologians have subsequently articulated various perspectives on how God's exercise of sovereignty corresponds to distinct self-imposed limitations.

== Theological views ==
=== Early Christian views ===
The theological tradition before Augustine (354 – 430) largely emphasizes the freedom of the human will. However, Augustine articulated God's sovereignty in terms of his continuous control and unifying governance of the universe. In contrast, the Greek church fathers generally rejected theological determinism as a means of exercising divine sovereignty and affirmed a classical free will theism. For example, Saint Maximus the Confessor (c. 580 – 662) argued that, because humans are created in the image of God, they possess a form of self-determination analogous to God's own. Similarly, John of Damascus (c. 675 - 749) maintained that God's sovereignty does not override human self-determination but allows human freedom to operate within divine providence.

=== Catholic views ===
Christian teaching on providence in the High Middle Ages was most fully developed by Thomas Aquinas in the Summa Theologica (1274). It viewed the concept of providence as a care exercised by God over the universe.

The Catechism of the Catholic Church (1993) expresses the concept of God's sovereignty as his rule over his creation, allowing human libertarian free will and co-operation with him: "God is the sovereign master of his plan. But to carry it out he also makes use of his creatures' co-operation. This use is not a sign of weakness, but rather a token of almighty God's greatness and goodness. God grants his creatures not only their existence, but also the dignity of acting on their own, of being causes and principles for each other".

=== Eastern Orthodox view ===
In general, Eastern Theology places much more emphasis on human freedom and less on God's sovereignty than do the Augustinian and Reformed strands of Western theology. Orthodox view of human free will is close to the Wesleyan-Arminian view.

=== Reformed view ===
Orthodox Reformed (both historical and Edwardsian Calvinism) view God's sovereignty as expressed through theological determinism. This means that every event in the world is determined by God. As the Westminster Confession of Faith put it: "God, from all eternity, did, by the most wise and holy counsel of His own will, freely, and unchangeably ordain whatever comes to pass."

From this perspective, God alone possesses free-will in the sense of ultimate self-determination. Moreover, God acts through voluntarism in its nominalist sense. This means, what God does is good not because it is guided by his character or moral structure within his nature, but only because God wants it. Besides, Calvinism affirm a determinism involving semicompatibilism, which implies the compatibility between human responsibility for an act and its determination by God.

Concerning salvation, Calvin expressly taught that it is God's sovereign decision to determine whether an individual is saved or damned. He writes "By predestination we mean the eternal decree of God, by which he determined with himself whatever he wished to happen with regard to every man. All are not created on equal terms, but some are preordained to eternal life, others to eternal damnation; and, accordingly, as each has been created for one or other of these ends, we say that he has been predestinated to life or to death." Indeed, human actions leading to this end are also predetermined by God.

Concerning prayer, from an Edwardsian Calvinist view, it can be seen as a predetermined means for a predetermined purpose. More generally, from the majority Calvinist view, prayer can't change by itself what is predetermined by God. Specifically, prayer for salvation will not change the predetermined damnation of some. Nor will prayer for salvation cause the predetermined salvation of the elect.

=== Arminian view ===
Arminianism holds that God is both omnipotent and omniscient. His power and knowledge are not subject to any external limitation but are exercised in accordance with his own divine nature and character.

This understanding of God gives rise to two fundamental principles. First, divine action must be conceived in such a way that God is never, even secondarily, the author of evil, since this would contradict his character, especially as fully revealed in Jesus Christ. Second, human responsibility for evil must be preserved. These two principles shape the Arminian understanding of divine sovereignty. God exercises a limited mode of providence, deliberately governing creation without determining every event, and his election is understood as a "predestination by foreknowledge". Consequently, God's foreknowledge is exhaustive and complete, fully compatible with human freedom of action.

Human free will is therefore granted and bounded by divine sovereignty, which nonetheless permits all people to accept the gospel through faith while also allowing them to resist it.

== Notes and references ==
=== Sources ===
- Alexander, David; Johnson, Daniel (2016). Calvinism and the Problem of Evil. Eugene, OR: Pickwick Publication.
- Baaren, Theodorus P. van; Stefon, Matt. (2020). "Providence". Encyclopædia Britannica.
- Bathrellos, Demetrios (2004). The Byzantine Christ: Person, Nature, and Will in the Christology of Saint Maximus the Confessor. Oxford: Oxford Academic.
- Brice, Ben (2023). Theological Voluntarism and Protestant Critiques of Natural Reason. Oxford: Oxford Academic.
- Calvin, John (1845). Institutes of the Christian Religion; a New Translation by Henry Beveridge. Vol. 2. Translated by Henry Beveridge. Edinburgh: Calvin Translation Society. books 2, 3.
- Clark, Gordon H. (1961). Religion, Reason, and Revelation. Philadelphia: Presbyterian and Reformed.
- Easton, Matthew G. (1897). "Sovereignty". Illustrated Bible Dictionary. London: Thomas Nelson.
- Fairbairn, Donald (2002). Eastern Orthodoxy Through Western Eyes. London: Westminster John Knox Press.
- Flowers, Leighton (2017). The Potter’s Promise: A Biblical Defense of Traditional Soteriology. [Evansville, Indiana]: Trinity Academic Press.
- Grudem, Wayne (1994). Systematic Theology: An Introduction to Biblical Doctrine. Leicester, England & Grand Rapids, MI: Inter-Varsity Press & Zondervan.
- Helm, Paul (2010). Calvin at the Center. Oxford: Oxford University Press.
- John Paul II (1993). Catechism of the Catholic Church Second Edition Apostolic Constitution Fidei Depositum. Citta del Vaticano: Libreria Editrice Vaticana.
- Kärkkäinen, Veli-Matti (2017). "Human Action within the Sovereignty of God: Christian Perspectives". Cuman Action within the Sovereignty of God: Christian Perspectives. Washington, DC: Georgetown University Press. doi:10.2307/j.ctt1trkk09.14.
- Leonard, William (1991). "Sovereignty of God". Holman Bible Dictionary. Nashville, TN: Broadman & Holman.
- Lewis, C. S. (2001). The Problem of Pain. San Francisco: Harper San Francisco.
- Louth, Andrew (2019). "Eastern Orthodox View". In Johnson, Adam J.; Gundry, Stanley N. (eds.). Five Views on the Extent of the Atonement. Grand Rapids, MI: Zondervan Academic. ISBN 9780310527718.
- McCall, Thomas H. (2008). "I Believe in Divine Sovereignty" (PDF). Trinity Journal. 29 (2): 205–226.
- McGrath, Alister (1998). Iustitia Dei : a history of the Christian doctrine of justification. Cambridge: Cambridge University Press.
- Oke, Norman R. (1983). "Divine Sovereignty". Beacon Dictionary of Theology. Kansas City, MO: Beacon Hill Press of Kansas City.
- Olson, Roger E. (2009). Arminian Theology: Myths and Realities. Downers Grove: InterVarsity Press.
- Olson, Roger E. (2010). "One more quick sidebar about clarifying Arminianism". Roger E. Olson: My evangelical, Arminian theological musings. Patheos.
- Olson, Roger E. (2014). Arminianism FAQ: Everything You Always Wanted to Know. [Franklin, TE]: Seebed.
- Olson, Roger E. (2018). "Calvinism and Arminianism Compared". Roger E. Olson: My evangelical, Arminian theological musings. Patheos.
- Packer, J.J. (April 2003). "Prayers for Salvation". Christianity Today.
- Picirilli, Robert (2002). Grace, Faith, Free Will: Contrasting Views of Salvation. Nashville: Randall House.
- Pink, Arthur (2001). The Sovereignty of God. Lafayette, IN: Sovereign Grace Publishers, Inc.
- Piper, John (2016-01-18). "Is God Sovereign Over My Free Will?". Desiring God.
- Plantinga, Alvin (1974). God, Freedom, and Evil. Grand Rapids, MI: William B. Eerdmans Publishing Company.
- Ryrie, Charles (1986). Basic Theology. Wheaton, IL: Victor Books.
- Sproul, R. C. (1986). Chosen by God. Carol Stream, IL: Tindale House Publishers, Inc.
- Sproul, R. C. (2011a). Essential Truths of the Christian Faith. Carol Stream, IL: Tindale House Publishers, Inc.
- Spurgeon, Charles (1860). "The Wailing of Risca". The Spurgeon Center.
- Tenney, Merrill C. (1975). The Zondervan Pictorial Encyclopedia of the Bible. Grand Rapids, MI: Zondervan Publishing House.
- Walker, Leslie Joseph (1911). "Divine Providence" . Catholic Encyclopedia. Vol. 12.
- Warfield, Benjamin (1971). Calvin and Augustine. Philadelphia: Presbyterian & Reformed Publishing Co.
- Westminster Assembly (1946) [1646]. S. W., Carruthers (ed.). The Confession of Faith of the Assembly of Divines at Westminster. London: Presbyterian Church of England.
- Wiley, H. Orton (1940). Christian theology. Vol. 1. Kansas City, MO: Beacon Hill Press.
