= John E. Sanders =

American Christian theologian

John Ernest Sanders (born 1956) is an American Christian theologian. He served as professor of religious studies at Hendrix College. Sanders is best known for his promotion of open theism but he has also written on religiious polarization, cognitive linguistics and religious pluralism (inclusivism).

== Biography ==
Sanders was born to Methodist parents in Central Illinois in 1956. He earned a doctoral degree (Th.D.) at the University of South Africa in 1996, a Master of Arts degree in theology from Wartburg Theological Seminary in 1987, and a bachelor's degree in philosophy from Trinity College (Illinois) in 1979. He is professor emeritus of religious studies at Hendrix College in Arkansas and previously taught at Huntington University in Indiana and Oak Hills Christian College in Minnesota. He was the Frederick J. Crosson Fellow at The Center for Philosophy of Religion (1997–1998) at the University of Notre Dame. He and his wife have five children.

Sanders began to reflect on divine providence after one of his brothers died in an accident. He says he first wondered why God orchestrated his brother's death. Yet, later when some Christian friends suggested that God had ordained his brother's death so that Sanders would get closer to God, he rejected that idea. Additionally, in college he read some theology books which asserted that God was strongly immutable and impassible such that our prayers never affect God. This made Sanders wonder whether his understanding of prayer (prayers could affect God) was correct. He spent a good portion of the next twenty years seeking to resolve such issues. Eventually, he became a proponent of open theism and contributed to the scholarship on the topic along with other open theists such as Clark Pinnock, Greg Boyd, and William Hasker.

His publications on both open theism and the destiny of the unevangelized were well received in some evangelical circles. However, conservative Calvinist evangelicals sharply criticized his work and he, along with Clark Pinnock, became controversial figures in evangelical theology. Pinnock and Sanders sought to reform evangelical theology, advocating what Brian McLaren calls “a generous orthodoxy.” Some referred to them as “postconservative evangelicals” or “postmodern evangelicals.” The lightning rod issue was Sanders’ and Pinnock's affirmation of “dynamic omniscience” which denies that God has exhaustive definite foreknowledge of future contingent events. In 2002 Roger Nicole, a conservative Calvinist and founding member of the Evangelical Theological Society (ETS), put forward a motion to expel Sanders and Pinnock from the Society on the grounds that their affirmation that God can change the divine mind is incompatible with doctrinal basis of the Society.

The executive committee of the ETS held formal hearings with Sanders and Pinnock and decided that they had no problems with Pinnock but said that they could not approve of Sanders’ belief in “probabilistic prophecy”, which claims that some biblical predictions about future events are not guaranteed since they are conditional upon what beings with free will decide to do. At issue here is the truth value of statements about the future actions of free creatures. At the 2003 annual ETS meeting the membership voted overwhelmingly to affirm Pinnock's inclusion but fell 25 votes short of the 2/3 majority necessary to expel Sanders.

Also in 2003 several Calvinist pastors in the tiny denomination which owned Huntington University put pressure on the Administration to remove Sanders from the faculty (he was professor of religion and philosophy). Even though William Hasker (one of the authors of The Openness of God with Sanders) had taught at Huntington for thirty years and some other faculty members affirmed open theism, only Sanders was examined by a “denominational commission.” In November 2004 the President of the university announced that the Board of Trustees had decided to dismiss Sanders. The President informed the faculty that the problem was not Sanders’ affirmation of open theism (since other open theists remain in the school's employ) but rather his notoriety in promoting them. Despite advocacy on his behalf by a Huntington student group called “Page 6” (referring to a statement on page 6 of the university catalog protecting academic freedom), Sanders was terminated from the university. Subsequently, he was hired at Hendrix College.

== Religious Polarization ==
Sanders’s book, Embracing Prodigals: Overcoming Authoritative Religion by Embodying Jesus’ Nurturing Grace (Cascade, 2020), uses the social sciences to explain why Christians are so polarized over politics, social issues, morality, and theological beliefs. Christians strongly disagree on religious beliefs such as how to understand the Bible, atonement, salvation of non-Christians, and hell. They are also polarized over issues such as same-gender marriage, income inequality, and health care.

Two social science models, Nurturant and Authoritative, explain this divide because each model emphasizes different values which are at the heart of our disagreements. Nurturants prize empathy and cooperation while Authoritatives cherish obedience to law and order. Each group has distinct core values and these values lead them to embrace different theological, moral, and political views. In addition, Nurturants and Authoritatives have vastly different understandings of love and justice which lead people to endorse divergent ways of parenting and teaching, as well as different views on incarceration and government programs.

The book explains the divide and makes the case that Jesus embodied the Nurturant way of life. He modeled empathy, grace, forgiveness, and care for those beyond his own tribe. The Nurturant and Authoritative approaches have competed for thousands of years but contemporary research shows that the Nurturant way of life produces better mental and spiritual health as well as superior communities in which to live.

== Cognitive linguistics ==
His Theology in the Flesh: How Embodiment and Culture Shape the Way We Think about Truth, Morality, and God is the first book to apply the field of cognitive linguistics to theology. According to cognitive linguistics, the specific types of bodies humans have shape how we interact with and understand our world. We have concepts such as up/down and in/out because we have bodies that can experience these sorts of things. Embodied experience also gives rise much of our metaphorical thinking. For instance, we know what it is like to go on a journey in which we experience getting to a destination together and perhaps overcoming obstacles on the way. Many, but not all, languages use the experience physical journeys as the framework in which to understand the experience of love. We say, "Our relationship has come a long way together" and "We have overcome many bumps in the road." We reason about our love relationship in terms of a journey. Yet, in English, we also conceive of love in terms of strong physical forces ("He's blown away by love"), magnetism ("She is attracted to him"), and even insanity ("He is crazy about her"). That means that metaphors can be cognitive and not merely rhetorical. We actually think with metaphors.

Theology in the Flesh shows that biblical writers used a wide array of metaphors to understand topics such as sin, salvation, and God. Salvation, for example, is thought of in terms of release from slavery, as friendship with God, as healing, as returning from the dead, and as finding your way home to list but a few. No single metaphor says everything that we can say about salvation and so multiple metaphors are needed. There are often several legitimate ways, within constraints, for Christians to understand a topic. The book provides lots of examples of how different Christian communities, over time and across cultures, use different metaphors for salvation and so arrive at conflicting theological positions.

The book also emphasizes prototype theory, which says humans often define things in terms of a "best example" of a category rather than with necessary and sufficient conditions. For instance, Americans understand "bird" by thinking of an animal about the size of a robin that flies and has wings and feathers. Although penguins are birds, they are not the best examples or prototypes. Sanders applies that approach to definitions of God and Christianity and explains why Jesus is so central to Christian moral and spiritual formation.

In light of cognitive linguistics, Sanders discusses how we should understand God, the nature of objective truth, moral reasoning, and various other theological topics. He urges the need for humility in our claims to truth and explains why Christians should expect both agreement on a few general topics along with significant variation on beliefs and practices between Christian communities.

== Sources and method ==
The God Who Risks has a section where Sanders delineates his sources and four criteria for a successful theological proposal. First, he says a theological model must agree with the major themes of Scripture. It need not agree with each and every biblical text, however. Second, it must find consonance with Christian tradition. He notes that there are multiple streams of tradition so a theological model is not likely to agree with all of them. Third, it must have conceptual intelligibility which includes logical consistency and comprehensiveness. He rejects theological ideas that are self-contradictory since they are “literally ‘nonsense’ and unintelligible.” Fourth, a good theological proposal must help one live out the Christian life by providing meaning to real-life situations. He acknowledges that these criteria do not offer a definitive way to resolve all theological differences and that theological diversity should be expected. This is why he says we need to practice dialogical virtues.

== Open theism ==
Sanders situates open theism as a form of freewill theism which goes back to the early church fathers and in Protestantism, it is prominent in the Arminian-Wesleyan traditions. In freewill theism God does not micromanage the creation, as is the case in theological determinism, but instead exercises “general sovereignty” by which God enacts the overarching structures in which creatures operate. Humans have libertarian free will such that for a free act the individual could have acted differently from reality. God does not determine or tightly control what humans do which means that God takes risks that humans might do things (like sin) that God does not want them to do. The divine will, for some things, can be thwarted. Freewill theists have emphasized reciprocal relations between humans and God when it comes to salvation and prayer. They believe that God graciously initiates the call to redemption by granting enabling grace but that humans are free to accept it or reject it. When believers petition God in prayer what the believer prays can have an effect on God. Some divine decisions are contingent upon our actions. In other words, God responds to what creatures do, and what happens in history makes a difference to the way God acts in history. When such ideas are applied to the divine attributes, freewill theists reject “strong” divine immutability (God cannot change in any respect) and “strong” impassibility (God cannot be affected by what creatures do). Freewill theists do affirm “weak” impassibility (God is not overcome by emotions as humans are apt to be) and “weak” immutability (the divine nature [love, faithfulness, power, etc.] never changes).

According to Sanders, open theism affirms the core doctrines and practices of freewill theism but believes that freewill theism needs to be modified on two points to explain certain biblical passages better and to be logically consistent. First, the majority (but not all) of freewill theists have affirmed that God is atemporal and so does not experience time. Open theists believe this is incompatible with the biblical portrayal of God interacting with creatures in which there is a before and an after and a give and receive in the divine experience. Also, Sanders believes that divine atemporality is incompatible with the core tenets of freewill theism since an atemporal being cannot be said to receive or respond to anything because an atemporal being simply cannot change in any respect. Since freewill theists believe that some of God's decisions are responses to human actions (e. g. in prayer and salvation) which implies change in some of God's actions, they should not affirm divine atemporality. Open theists hold that God is everlasting (always was, is, and will be) rather than atemporal.

The second point of contention between freewill and open theists is exhaustive definite foreknowledge of future contingent events. Freewill theists have traditionally affirmed what is known as simple foreknowledge according to which God, prior to creation, just “sees” or knows all that will ever happen in history. Sanders argues that the simple foreknowledge view has conflicts with types of biblical texts mentioned below and has two philosophical problems. The first problem is the old debate about whether or not divine foreknowledge entails determinism. Open theists argue that exhaustive definite foreknowledge is incompatible with the freewill of creatures. The other problem with simple foreknowledge is that it is useless for God to possess it since once God knows what is going to happen God cannot change it from happening. Sanders argues that simple foreknowledge cannot explain such things as prophecy, divine guidance, or why God did not prevent particular evils. Instead, open theists affirm “dynamic omniscience” (a term coined by Sanders). God knows all that has happened in the past and all that is happening in the present. God knows those future events that are determined to occur and God knows all that could possibly happen but does not know as definite what creatures with freewill will do. God has anticipatory knowledge (foresight) of what we are likely to do so God is not caught off-guard.

This does not mean that Sanders believes God's knowledge of the future is “limited” as some critics have charged. Rather, Sanders holds that what is referred to as “the” future is not an ontological reality—it does not exist. If it does not exist then there is literally “no thing” or actuality for God to know. Open theists are not saying that there is a reality about which God is ignorant (which would be limited omniscience). The denial that God has exhaustive definite foreknowledge of future contingent events has been the single most controversial aspect of open theism.

The term “open” in open theism involves two important ideas: (1) God is open to what creatures do (God is affected by creatures) and (2) the future is open in that there are multiple possible futures (the branching tree model of the future or like a create your own story book). Because God is open to us, God enters into genuine give-and-receive relations with creatures. For example, God truly responds to our prayers. God responds to what we do and adjusts the divine plans, if necessary. For Sanders, God has flexible strategies for accomplish divine goals (there is more than one route to the destination). There is not a blueprint which God is following for the construction of the kingdom. Rather, it “is a lot like jazz, a melody with a good deal of improvisation.” Open theists are clear to affirm with other freewill theists, however, that even though God has changing emotions, plans, and actions, the divine nature does not change. God's love, wisdom, power, faithfulness, etc. are unchangeable.

=== Key texts ===
According to Sanders, there are several types of scriptural texts that support the open view of divine providence.

1. "The Bible portrays God as authentically responding to his people’s petitions" (e.g. 2 Kings 20; Mark 2:5, 6:5-6; James 4:2).
2. "The Bible portrays God as being affected by creatures [e. g. grieving] and as sometimes being surprised by what they do" (e.g. Genesis 6:6; Ezekiel 12:1-3; Jeremiah 3:7).
3. "The Bible portrays God as testing people in order to discover what they will do" (e.g. Genesis 22:12; Exodus 15:25, 33:5).
4. "The Bible portrays God as changing his mind [altering plans] as he relates to his creatures" (e.g. Exodus 32; 1 Samuel 2:30, Jonah 4:2, Judges 10).
5. The Bible portrays God as anticipating specific events that do not happen (e. g. Ezek. 26:1-16, 29:17-20).

Sanders provides a documented historical list of proponents of the dynamic omniscience view in order to show that it has had some support in theological tradition. The view had few adherents in Christianity until after the Protestant Reformation. In the Christian tradition he lists Calcidius (fifth century), a number of Methodists such as Andrew Ramsay, Adam Clarke, Billy Hibbard, and Lorenzo Dow McCabe. Others include Samuel Fancourt (18th Century) and in the Nineteenth Century Isaak Dorner, Joel Hays, and T. W. Brents (Restoration movement). In the twentieth century Sanders cites biblical scholars Terence Fretheim and John Goldingay along with many theologians such as Jurgen Moltmann, John Polkinghorne, Paul Fiddes, Michael Welker, Clark Pinnock, Greg Boyd, Hendrikus Berkhof, Nicholas Wolterstorff, Barry Callen, and philosophers such as Richard Swinburne, Vincent Brummer, William Hasker, Peter Van Inwagen, J. R. Lucas, Peter Geach, and Keith Ward. Sanders also cites some non Christians who held the view including Cicero, Alexander of Aphrodisias (Second Century CE), Porphyry, and two significant Medieval Jewish theologians named Ibn Ezra and Gersonides.

== On inclusivism ==
In his What About Those Who Have Never Heard? Sanders tells a story about a college student who rejected Christianity because, he claimed, it “damns to hell all those who never hear about Jesus.” Sanders replied that though some Christians held that position there are several other views which have been affirmed by Christians throughout history. In his book, No Other Name, he discusses a range of views affirmed by Christians. Sanders coined the term “restrictivism” for the view that Christian salvation is possible only for those who have heard about the gospel of Jesus and put their faith in Jesus prior to their death. Those who die without knowing about Jesus cannot inherit eternal life. The second view he discusses is universalism (or apokatastasis) according to which every human who has ever lived will be redeemed. Between these polar views are what Sanders calls the “wider hope” and he spends the most time on two views in this category. One is what he calls eschatological evangelization or postmortem salvation. In this view if a person dies without having heard of Jesus then he or she will encounter Jesus after death and be provided an opportunity to put their faith in Jesus. The final position Sanders covers is the one he affirms: inclusivism. The unevangelized are saved by the work of Jesus if they respond in faith to God based on the revelation they have available.

For Sanders this question is part of the “soteriological problem of evil. How can God be said to be all-loving. . . if those who die never hearing about Jesus have no opportunity to be saved?” He says the problem arises out of two beliefs commonly affirmed by Christians: (1) that Jesus is the only savior and (2) that God desires all people to be saved. He believes that inclusivism holds these two beliefs together and that it best accords with how God seems to have worked in history. He admits, however, that no position, including his own, is free of difficulties.

In support of inclusivism he provides several types of arguments. First, he cites biblical texts which he takes to affirm “God’s radical love” for humanity such as the parable of the prodigal son (Luke 15). God ignores our insults and longs to embrace us. God genuinely wants all people to be redeemed (2 Peter 3:9). Second, Sanders holds that all people are included in God's grace and those who are excluded are those who exclude themselves as in the story of the king's son's wedding (Matthew 22). Third, he speaks about the “great reversal” in Jesus’ teaching in which Jesus “gave hope for those considered outsiders while challenging the assurance of those who considered themselves insiders.” Fourth, Sanders argues that people in the Old Testament era were saved if they responded in trust to God. He calls this “the faith principle.” It is not how much you know but whether or not one responds positively to the revelation they have. He says that God reaches out to people “via general revelation, conscience and human culture. God does not leave himself without witness to any people. Salvation for the unevangelized is made possible only by the redemptive work of Jesus, but God applies that work even to those who are ignorant of the atonement.” The Holy Spirit is actively seeking people even where Christians are not present. He cites C.S. Lewis: “every prayer which is sincerely made even to a false god…is accepted by the true God,” and “Christ saves many who do not think they know him.” Sanders gives four reasons why he does not believe that inclusivism deprives Christians of the motivation to evangelize. First, Jesus wants us to do so. Second, those who have experienced the love of God in Jesus should desire to share it with others. Third, there are those who do not believe in God and they need to be lovingly challenged. Fourth, God not only wants people to experience life after death, God wants them to experience the blessings of a transformed life now.

== Hell, atonement and violence ==
Sanders has also written on the variety of views Christians affirm on the nature of hell with special attention given to how divine love and justice are understood. Though some Christians understand suffering in hell to be literal, others conceive it as annihilation or that hell is temporary until all turn to God. He edited a collection on violence in relation to the atonement.

== Publications ==
Authored Books:

- Embracing Prodigals: Overcoming Authoritative Religion by Embodying Jesus’ Nurturing Grace (Cascade, 2020).
- "Theology in the Flesh: How Embodiment and Culture Shape the Way We Think about Truth, Morality, and God" (Fortress Press, August 1, 2016.)
- The God Who Risks: A Theology of Providence, revised edition (IVP, 2007). First edition 1998.
- With Chris Hall, Does God have a Future? A Debate on Divine Providence (Baker Academic, 2003).
- With Clark Pinnock, Richard Rice, David Basinger, and William Hasker: The Openness of God: A Biblical Challenge to the Traditional Understanding of God. (Paternoster inU.K., IVP in U.S.A., 1994)
- No Other Name: An Investigation into the Destiny of the Unevangelized (Eerdmans, U.S.A., SPCK in U.K., 1992).

Edited Books:

- Divine Action: Challenges for Muslim and Christian Theology. Co-editor with Klaus Von Stosch in Brill’s Contributions to Comparative Theology series, 2021.
- Atonement and Violence: A Theological Conversation (Abingdon Press, 2006).
- What About Those Who Have Never Heard? Three Views. (IVP, 1995).

Edited Journal Topical Issues:

- "Cognitive Linguistics and Theology" ("Open Theology", 2018).
- Philosophia. “The Virtue of Justice.” Co-editor with J. Aaron Simmons 41:2. June 2013.

Journal Articles and Book Chapters

- “Introduction: The Nurturant Values Undergirding Postconservative Theology” in Ronald Michener and Mark Lambert editors, Handbook on Postconservative Theological Interpretation. Cascade, 2024.
- “Liturgical Jellyfish” in Philosophies of Liturgy: Explorations of Embodied Religious Practice edited by J. Aaron Simmons, Bruce Benson and Neal DeRoo. Bloomsbury, 2023. pp. 61–74.
- “Sanders in Dialogue with Muslim Responses to Open Theism.” Divine Action: Challenges for Muslim and Christian Theology. Sanders and Von Stosch eds. (Brill, 2021). pp. 65–76.
- “Providence in Light of an Open God and an Open Future.” Divine Action: Challenges for Muslim and Christian Theology. Sanders and Von Stosch eds. (Brill, 2021). pp. 3–18.
- “Methodism, the Bible, and Same-Gender Relations.” Wesleyan Theological Journal. Spring 2020: 158-169.
- “Open Theism.” The Encyclopedia of Philosophy of Religion (Wiley-Blackwell, 2020).
- “From Capstone to Springboard: A Way to Incorporate Career Readiness into the Senior Colloquium.” National Association of Colleges and Employers Journal. November 2019.
- “Foreword” to The God Who Trusts by Curtis Holtzen (IVP, 2019).
- “Divine Agency as Literal in Cognitive Linguistic Perspective: Response to ‘Conceiving God’ by Robert Masson.” Open Theology Journal vol. 4 (2018): 489-495.
- “Introduction to Cognitive Linguistics and Theology.” Open Theology Journal vol. 4 (2018): 541-544.
- “Christian Approaches to the Salvation of Non-Christians” in Robert McKim ed., Religious Perspectives on Religious Diversity, Philosophy of Religion series vol. 6 (Brill, 2017). pp. 120–148.
- With William Hasker, “Open Theism: Progress and Prospects.” Theologische Literaturzeitung 142/9 (2017): 859-872.
- “Response to Scott McKnight.” Syndicate Theology October 23, 2017.
- “Response to Sharron Baker Putt.” Syndicate Theology October 16, 2017.
- “Response to Van Slyke.” Syndicate Theology October 9, 2017.
- “Response to Bonnie Howe.” Syndicate Theology October 2, 2017.
- “God, Evil, and Relational Risk” in Michael Peterson ed., The Problem of Evil: Selected Readings, second edition (University of Notre Dame Press, 2016). pp. 327–343.
- “Why Oord’s Essential Kenosis Model Fails to Solve the Problem of Evil While Retaining Miracles.” Wesleyan Theological Journal 51 no. 2 (Fall, 2016): 174–187.
- “A Goldilocks God: Open Theism as a Feuerbachian Alternative?” Coauthored with J. Aaron Simmons. Element 6, no. 2 (Fall 2015): 35–53.
- “Open Theism.” Routledge Encyclopedia of Philosophy Online, April, 2015.
- “Raising Hell About Razing Hell: Evangelical Debates on Universal Salvation” Perspectives in Religious Studies 40 no. 3 (2013): 267–281.
- “Open Theistic Perspectives—The Freedom of Creation” in Ernst Conradie ed., Creation and Salvation Volume 2: A Companion on Recent Theological Movements (LIT Verlag, Berlin, 2012).
- “Conceptual Metaphor Theory and the Mormon Understanding of God” in Jacob T. Baker ed., Mormonism at the Crossroads of Philosophy and Theology: Essays in Honor of David. L. Paulsen (Greg Kofford Books, 2012).
- “Open Creation and the Redemption of the Environment,” Wesleyan Theological Journal, 47/1 (Spring 2012): 141–149.
- “Divine Reciprocity and Epistemic Openness in Clark Pinnock’s Theology,” The Other Journal: the Church and Postmodernity (January 2012).
- “Hell Yes! Hell No! Evangelical Debates on Eternal Punishment,” in Margaret Toscano and Isabel Moreira eds., Hell and Its Afterlife: Historical and Contemporary Perspectives (Ashgate, 2010), 137–152.
- “The Eternal Now and Theological Suicide: A Reply to Laurence Wood,” Wesleyan Theological Journal 45.2 (Fall, 2010): 67–81.
- “Theological Muscle-Flexing: How Human Embodiment Shapes Discourse About God,” in Thomas Jay Oord ed., Creation Made Free: Open Theology Engaging Science (Pickwick Publications, 2009).
- “Divine Suffering in Open Theism” in D. Steven Long ed., The Sovereignty of God Debate (Wipf and Stock Publishing, 2008).
- “Divine Providence and the Openness of God,” in Bruce Ware ed., Perspectives on the Doctrine of God: Four Views (Broadman & Holman, 2008).
- “An Introduction to Open Theism,” Reformed Review, Vol. 60, no. 2 (Spring 2007).
- “How Do We Decide What God is Like?” in And God saw that it was good: Essays on Creation and God in Honor of Terence E. Fretheim, ed. Frederick Gaiser and Mark Throntveit, (Word & World supplement series 5, April, 2006).
- “Response to the Stone Campbell Movement and Open Theism,” in Evangelicalism and the Stone-Campbell Movement, Vol. 2, ed. William Baker (Abilene Christian University Press, 2006).
- “The Destiny of the Unevangelized: the Major Views” in Salvation in Christ: Catholic, Orthodox, Protestant, and Mormon Perspectives eds. Roger Keller and Robert Millet (Brigham Young University Press, 2005): 299–325.
- "A Freewill Theistic Response to Talbott’s Universalism” in Universal Salvation? The Contemporary Debate, eds. Robin Parry and Christopher Partridge, (Paternoster in U.K. 2003; Eerdmans in U.S.A. 2004).
- “On Reducing God to Human Proportions” in Semper Reformandum: Studies in Honour of Clark Pinnock, eds. Anthony Cross and Stanley Porter (Paternoster, U.K. and Eerdmans, U.S. 2003), pp. 111–125.
- “Is Open Theism a Radical Revision or Minuscule Modification of Arminianism?” Wesleyan Theological Journal 38.2 (Fall 2003): 69–102.
- “On Heffalumps and Heresies: Responses to Accusations Against Open Theism” Journal of Biblical Studies 2, no. 1 (Spring 2002): 1-44.
- “Be Wary of Ware: A Reply to Bruce Ware” Journal of the Evangelical Theological Society (June 2002): 221–231.
- “A Tale of Two Providences.” Ashland Theological Journal 33 (2001): 41–55.
- “The Assurance of Things to Come” in Looking to the Future, ed. David Baker, (BakerBook House, 2001): 281–294.
- “Does God know your Next Move?” with Chris Hall, Christianity Today, May 21, 2001, pp. 38–45 and June 7, 2001, pp. 50–56.
- “Theological Lawbreaker?” Books and Culture (January, 2000) pp. 10–11. Reprinted in Taking Sides: Clashing Views on Controversial Issues in Religion, Daniel Judd, ed. (McGraw-Hill, 2002).
- "Idolater Indeed! Response to Paul Knitter's Christology," in The Uniqueness of Jesus: A Dialogue with Paul Knitter, ed. Leonard Swidler and Paul Mojzes, (Orbis, 1997).
- "Why Simple Foreknowledge Offers No More Providential Control than the Openness of God," Faith and Philosophy 14, no. 1 (Jan. 1997): 26–40. Also published in Kevin Timpe, ed., Arguing about Religion (Routledge, second edition, 2009): 362–373.
- "Evangelical Responses to Salvation Outside the Church," Christian Scholars Review. (Sept. 1994): 45–58
- "God as Personal," Clark Pinnock ed. The Grace of God, the Will of Man (Zondervan, 1989), 165–180.
- "Is Belief In Christ Necessary for Salvation?" Evangelical Quarterly 60 (1988): 241–259.
- "Mercy to All: Romans 1-3 and the Destiny of the Unevangelized," Proceedings of the Wheaton College Theology Conference 1 (1992): 216–228.
- "The Perennial Debate," Christianity Today (May 14, 1990): 20–21.
