= Jack Provonsha =

American theologian

Jack Wendell Provonsha

Personal details
- Born: May 30, 1919
- Died: August 11, 2004 (aged 85)
- Occupation: Protestant, Seventh-day Adventist Theologian

Jack Wendell Provonsha (May 30, 1919 – August 11, 2004) was a Seventh-day Adventist Physician and ethicist.

== Biography ==
He was born on May 30, 1919. He was an emeritus professor of Christian ethics and philosophy of religion at Loma Linda University. He was also the founding director of the Center for Christian Bioethics at the university. He died on August 11, 2004.

== See also ==
- Seventh-day Adventist Church
- Seventh-day Adventist theology
- Seventh-day Adventist eschatology
- History of the Seventh-day Adventist Church
- 28 fundamental beliefs
- Questions on Doctrine
- Teachings of Ellen White
- Inspiration of Ellen White
- Prophecy in the Seventh-day Adventist Church
- Investigative judgment
- The Pillars of Adventism
- Second Advent
- Baptism by Immersion
- Conditional Immortality
- Historicism
- Three Angels' Messages
- End times
- Sabbath in Seventh-day Adventism
- Ellen G. White
- Adventist
- Seventh-day Adventist Church Pioneers
- Seventh-day Adventist worship
- Avondale College
- Ellen G. White Estate
