= Theopaschism =

Belief that God can suffer

Theopaschism is the belief that the divine nature can suffer. Owing to controversies about the passion of Jesus and his divinity.

== Christology ==
In Christian theology this involves questions such as "was the crucifixion of Jesus a crucifixion of God?" The question is central to the schism between those churches which accepted the First Council of Ephesus and the Assyrian Church of the East. While not Nestorian, the Assyrian Church of the East, along with their greatest teacher, Babai the Great, deny the possibility of a suffering God.

Modern scholars, such as Paul Gavrilyuk, have argued that one of the central debates of the 5th century was how Christ suffered on the cross. It seemed that Cyril of Alexandria favoured a grammatical sense of theopaschism, meaning he was able to write statements such as 'God died' or 'God was crucified' in a qualified sense. This scandalised Nestorius who wanted a firm separation of the natures of Christ, and would much rather have said that Jesus Christ the man suffered.

== Modern philosophy ==
A number of modern philosophers and theologians have been called theopaschists, such as G. W. F. Hegel, Friedrich Nietzsche and Simone Weil. Kazoh Kitamori's Theology of the Pain of God (1946) and Moltmann's The Crucified God (1972) are two 20th-century books that have taken up the ancient theological idea that at least "one of the Trinity has suffered" (unus de Trinitate passus est). In the words of Hans Urs von Balthasar:

"At this point, where the subject undergoing the 'hour' is the Son speaking with the Father, the controversial 'Theopaschist formula' has its proper place: 'One of the Trinity has suffered'. The formula can already be found in Gregory Nazianzen: 'We needed a ... crucified God'."

== See also ==
- Dyophysitism
- Hypostatic union
