= Impassibility =

Theological doctrine

Impassibility (from Latin in-, "not", passibilis, "able to suffer, experience emotion") describes the theological doctrine that God does not experience pain or pleasure from the actions of another being. It has often been seen as a consequence of divine aseity, the idea that God is absolutely independent of any other being, i.e., in no way causally dependent. Being affected (literally made to have a certain emotion, affect) by the state or actions of another would seem to imply causal dependence.

Some theological systems portray God as a being expressive of many (or all) emotions. Other systems, mainly Christianity, Judaism and Islam, portray God as a being that does not experience suffering. However, in Christianity there was an ancient dispute about the impassibility of God (see Nestorianism). Still, it is understood in all Abrahamic religions, including Christianity, that God is "without passions", because God is immutable. So in Christianity, while the human nature of Christ is mutable and passable, the Godhead is not. (Bible, book of James, chapter 1 verse 17: "Every good gift and every perfect gift is from above, and cometh down from the Father of lights, with whom is no variableness, neither shadow of turning." (King James Version).

== Christianity ==
=== Roman Catholic Church ===
The Catholic Church teaches dogmatically that God is impassible.

Impassibility of God the Father is mentioned in the Aquileian Creed (before the 4th century). As the Aquileian Creed affirms, this faith was shared by the Christian Churches of Rome, Alexandria of Egypt and Jerusalem.

The impassibility of God is also indirectly affirmed by the First Vatican Council's apostolic constitution Dei Filius, which emphasizes the ineffability of God:

The holy Catholic Apostolic Roman Church believes and confesses that there is one true and living God, Creator and Lord of heaven and earth, almighty, eternal, immense, incomprehensible, infinite in intelligence, in will, and in all perfection, who, as being one, sole, absolutely simple and immutable spiritual substance, is to be declared as really and essentially distinct from the world, of supreme beatitude in and from Himself, and ineffably exalted above all things which exist, or are conceivable, except Himself.

— Dei Filius, Chapter I

The divine nature accordingly has no emotions, changes, alterations, height, width, depth, or any other temporal attributes. While Jesus Christ's human nature was complete, and thus Christ possessed a human body, human mind and human soul, and thus human emotions, this human nature was hypostatically united with the timeless, immutable, impassible divine nature, which retained all of its divine attributes without alteration, just as his human nature retained all of its human attributes. In Catholic doctrine, it would be erroneous and blasphemous to attribute changes or emotional states to God, except by analogy. Thus scriptural expressions which indicate "anger" or "sadness" on God's part are considered anthropomorphisms, mere analogies to explain mankind's relationship to God, who is impassible in his own nature. Some objecting to this claim assert that if God cannot have emotions, then God cannot love, which is a central tenet of Christianity. However, Catholics would point out that love is not an emotion except in a secondary sense, and is far more than simply a changeable emotion. Furthermore, the human nature of Christ expressed emotional love as well as possessing the timeless, unconditioned "agape" of God.

=== Main theologians ===
Theodoret, an early Christian bishop and theologian, wrote, "wild and blasphemous are they who ascribe passion to the divine nature," in his Demonstrations by Syllogism.

Augustinism, one of the chief Christian schools of thought associated most often with Roman Catholicism and Calvinist Protestantism, strongly asserts the impassibility of God, as well as his impeccability. It also defends the notion of acts of God and divine intercession, such as the miracles of the Scriptures.

Martin Luther and especially John Calvin were heavily influenced by Augustine, and their theologies are similar in many respects in regard to divine impassibility.

Generally, scholars do not take anthropomorphic phrases in the Bible like "the finger of God" or "the hand of God" to mean that God literally has a hand or finger. Rather, it is interpreted as an allegory for the Holy Spirit and an expression of God's sovereignty over and intervention into the material world.

=== Views in scripture ===
Other Christian views portray a God who does have emotions and emotional reactions to creation, but these emotions should not necessarily be viewed as altogether similar to human emotions. Genesis 1 says that humans were made in God's image, but human emotions, originally a reflection of God's emotional capacity, have been marred by the fall of man.

Human emotions are subject to time, space, and circumstance. God's emotions are always in keeping with God's character as described by the scriptures and in the person of Jesus Christ, according to Christian scholars and the Bible. A few examples are found in Genesis, chapter 8, in the account of the Flood.

God is "grieved" at the pervasive evil of mankind, yet "pleased" with Noah's faithfulness. After the flood, God is "pleased" by Noah's burnt offering. Traditional Christian interpretation understood such depictions of changing emotion in God to be simply an anthropomorphic way of expressing his pleasure or displeasure with human actions. They believed God's eternal will for mankind and love for mankind in Christ does not undergo alteration; God is immutable.

Although there are differing opinions in Christian circles about the impassibility of God, Christian scholars consent that Jesus was completely human and completely God, and so expressed sanctified emotions and was subject to the same physical limitations as humanity, such as hunger or exhaustion. Most Christians traditionally believed these experiences to be proper only to Jesus' human nature.

The New Testament says in Hebrews, "For we do not have a high priest who is unable to sympathize with our weaknesses, but we have one who has been tempted in every way, just as we are—yet was without sin." For this reason, God accepted Christ's sacrifice on man's behalf and so is able to offer atonement through Christ.

=== Gnosticism ===
Some early adepts of gnosticism held that Jesus did not have a living body and was not able to suffer the Passion. This debate occupied a great deal of early Church Fathers, who took labours to prove that Jesus really did have a human body.

=== Theopaschism ===
A rival doctrine is called theopaschism, which highly insists on the suffering of the Lord Jesus at the Passion. However, theopaschism, along with patripassionism, has often been rejected by theologians as a form of modalism.

== Judaism ==
Jews generally hold to the impassibility of God and do not believe that the Messiah is divine or spiritual, but rather that he is political. The belief in divine simplicity is at the heart of Judaism, and the gender of God (i.e., God the Father) is not specified.

== Islam ==
The Islamic religion is based on the notion of the absolute impassibility of God, an impassibility which is only matched by transcendence. Islam does not believe in incarnation, passion, Holy Trinity and resurrection and God the Father because it is seen as an attack on divine impassibility.

Although love and mercy are attributed to God, it is emphasised that God is completely dissimilar to created things. Al-Rahman & Al-Raheem, the Merciful, is one of the primary names of God in Islam, but meant in terms of God being beneficent towards creation rather than in terms of softening of the heart. The latter implies a psychological change, and contradicts God's absolute transcendence.

== Greek mythology ==
Many polytheistic traditions portray their gods as feeling a wide range of emotions. For example, Zeus is famous for his lustfulness, Susano-o for his intemperance, and Balder for his joyousness and calm. Impassibility in the Western tradition traces back to ancient Greek philosophers like Aristotle and Plato, who first proposed the idea of God as a perfect, omniscient, timeless, and unchanging being not subject to human emotion (which represents change and imperfection). The concept of impassibility was developed by medieval theologians like Anselm and continues to be in tension with more emotional concepts of God.

== Bibliography ==
- Helm, Paul. "The Impossibility of Divine Passibility". In The Power and Weakness of God. Ed. Nigel M. de Cameron. Edinburgh: Rutherford House Books, 1990.
- Johnson, Phillip R. God Without Mood Swings: Recovering the Doctrine of Divine Impassibility
- Keating, James F., Thomas Joseph White. Divine Impassibility and the Mystery of Human Suffering. Grand Rapids: Eerdmans, 2009.
- Gavrilyuk, Paul L. The Suffering of the Impassible God: The Dialectics of Patristic Thought. Oxford: Oxford University Press, 2004/ 2006.
- Lister, Rob. God is Impassible and Impassioned: Toward a Theology of Divine Emotion. Wheaton: Crossway, 2012.
- Weinandy, Thomas G. Does God Suffer? Notre Dame: University of Notre Dame Press, 2000.
- Creel, Richard E. Divine Impassibility. Cambridge, UK: Cambridge University Press, 1986.
- The Nature of Love: A Theology, Thomas Jay Oord (2010) ISBN 978-0-8272-0828-5
- Sasser, Nathan. "God is Impassible and Impassioned".
- Scrutton, Anastasia Philippa. Thinking through Feeling: God, Emotion and Passibility. New York: Continuum, 2011.
