= Immutability of God in Christianity =

Attribute of God in Christianity

The Unchangeability or Immutability of God is an attribute that "God is unchanging in his character, will, and covenant promises."

The Westminster Shorter Catechism says that "[God] is a spirit, whose being, wisdom, power, holiness, justice, goodness, and truth are infinite, eternal, and unchangeable." Those things do not change. A number of Scriptures attest to this idea (such as Num. 23:19; 1 Sam. 15:29; Ps. 102:26; Mal. 3:6; 2 Tim. 2:13; Heb. 6:17–18; Jam. 1:17)

God's immutability defines all God's other attributes: God is immutably wise, merciful, good, and gracious: Primarily, God is almighty/omnipotent (all powerful), omnipresent (present everywhere), and omniscient (knows everything); eternally and immutably so. Infiniteness and immutability in God are mutually supportive and imply each other. An infinite and changing God is inconceivable; indeed, it is a contradiction in definition.

The Compendium Theologiae of Thomas Aquinas derives the necessary existence of God from His immutability and immobility:

For everything that has the possibility of being and of not being, is mutable. But God is absolutely immutable, as has been demonstrated. Therefore it is impossible for God to be and not to be. But anything that exists in such a way that it is impossible for it not to exist, is necessarily Being itself, ipsum esse. Necessary existence, and impossibility of nonexistence, mean one and the same thing. Therefore God must necessarily exist.

== In the Roman Catholic Church ==
The immutability of God is affirmed by the First Vatican Council's apostolic constitution Dei Filius:

The holy Catholic Apostolic Roman Church believes and confesses that there is one true and living God, Creator and Lord of heaven and earth, almighty, eternal, immense, incomprehensible, infinite in intelligence, in will, and in all perfection, who, as being one, sole, absolutely simple and immutable spiritual substance, is to be declared as really and essentially distinct from the world, of supreme beatitude in and from Himself, and ineffably exalted above all things which exist, or are conceivable, except Himself.

— Dei Filius, Chapter I

== Criticism ==
While most Christians believe that there are aspects of God that do not change, opponents believe that the benevolence of God is often expressed through his willingness to change his promised course of action which implies a certain level of mutability. (See Exodus 32:14 and Numbers 14:12-20; Jonah 3:10; Amos 7:3-9; Jeremiah 26:3)

For example, when God was giving the law and the Ten Commandments to Moses, he was gone for so long that Aaron, his brother the high priest, and the people, thought that he was dead or that something had happened, and the people asked Aaron to build them the Golden Calf. On that occasion, and during another when the people rebel against Moses and God, God threatens to destroy the people and make a nation out of Moses alone, but Moses reminds God of the promise he made to Abraham to make Israel a great nation. God relents, but says that all those who participated will not be allowed to enter Canaan, the promised land.

It could be said that God knows beforehand all the possible steps each creature – i.e., which steps each human could take at any given moment, whether good or bad, and God also knows beforehand from eternity what he will or will not ultimately do in any given situation, knowing that sometimes he will say he is going to do something worse – and then doing either a less negative response or nothing at all. This allows God to exhibit a unique form of free will, and to show his mercy and forgiveness and holiness – qualities God values.

== See also ==
- Christian theology
