= Clark Pinnock =

Canadian theologian (1937–2010)

Clark H. Pinnock
- Born: February 3, 1937; Toronto, Ontario, Canada
- Died: August 15, 2010 (aged 73)
- Occupations: Christian theologian; apologist; author

Academic background
- Education: University of Toronto; University of Manchester
- Thesis: The Doctrine of the Holy Spirit in St. Paul
- Doctoral advisor: F. F. Bruce

Clark H. Pinnock (February 3, 1937 – August 15, 2010) was a Canadian theologian, apologist, and author. He was Professor Emeritus of Systematic Theology at McMaster Divinity College.

== Education and career ==
Pinnock was born in Toronto, Ontario, Canada on February 3, 1937. He grew up in a liberal Baptist congregation. Pinnock once recounted that as a child he had little interest in the church. Even though he was brought up in Liberal Christianity, he later became part of the broad Evangelical tradition, and explored Reformed, Arminian and Pentecostal streams of thought.

Pinnock described his shifts in thought as a pilgrimage:

So I do not apologize for admitting to being on a pilgrimage in theology, as if it were in itself some kind of weakness of intelligence or character. Feeling our way toward the truth is the nature of theological work even with the help of Scripture, tradition and community .... A pilgrimage, therefore, far from being unusual or slightly dishonorable, is what we would expect theologians who are properly aware of their limitations to experience.

Pinnock studied in the Ancient Near Eastern Studies program at the University of Toronto, graduating in 1960. He then was awarded both a Woodrow Wilson Fellowship to Harvard and a British Commonwealth Scholarship to England. Pinnock decided to go to England to study under F.F. Bruce at Manchester University. The dissertation for his Ph.D. was "The Doctrine of the Holy Spirit in St. Paul". Several years later, in 1965, he joined the faculty of New Orleans Baptist Theological Seminary. From 1969 to 1974, Pinnock taught at Trinity Evangelical Divinity School, Deerfield, Illinois, and from 1974 to 1977 at Regent College in Vancouver. He taught at McMaster Divinity College from 1977 until his retirement in 2002.

== Theology ==
Though Pinnock was probably most widely known as a proponent of open theism, he contributed to many other areas of theology as well. For example, Pinnock’s most thorough work of systematic theology may be his book Flame of Love, which was a 1997 Christianity Today book award winner. In it, he explored various aspects of theology from the perspective of the Holy Spirit. In this book, he dealt with issues relating to the Trinity, Christ, the church, union with God, and revelation. His theology centered around the Trinity, and it was both sacramental and charismatic. He drew on influences from within Protestantism, Pentecostalism, Roman Catholicism, and Eastern Orthodoxy.

In his book A Wideness in God’s Mercy, Pinnock explored the idea of the destiny of the unevangelized. He contended that pluralism is a major issue in modern theology and that strict exclusivism is as well. He opted for a position known as inclusivism. He said that it is misguided to affirm that general revelation can only condemn since God is the Lord of both general and special revelation. He affirmed that salvation is through Christ alone, but he was open to the idea that people may respond to the light that they have. He sought to back this up from a scriptural perspective, citing examples like Melchizedek. He also left open the possibility of post-mortem conversion.

Most Moved Mover was his most thorough explanation of his open-theist perspective. His book Tracking the Maze dealt with the situation of modern theology and sought to arrive at a way forward, and The Scripture Principle, coauthored with Barry Callen, explored an evangelical view of Scripture. Barry Callen also wrote Pinnock’s biography, entitled Journey Toward Renewal.

Clark Pinnock wrote articles on several other issues, including an annihilationist view of hell. In this, he stated problems with the traditional view and argued that an annihilationist view can be grounded in Scripture. He faulted the traditional view for grossly distorting the character of God and being based on unbiblical presuppositions. He claimed that, since souls are not inherently eternal (the view of souls being eternal in and of themselves coming from Plato and not Paul), it is not hard to understand imagery like consuming fire to consume and eternal destruction to mean destroyed eternally. He noted that this is still a very serious matter for one to miss out on all that one was intended for.

Upon Pinnock's death, Christianity Today wrote of him that "he was reputed to study carefully, think precisely, argue forcefully, and shift his positions willingly if he discovered a more fruitful pathway of understanding".

== Personal life ==
Pinnock married Dorothy Jane Stipanuk (born 1934), and their one daughter is a theology professor in Texas.

== Works ==
=== Books ===
- Pinnock, Clark H. (1967). A Defense of Biblical Infallibility. International Library of Philosophy and Theology: Biblical and theological studies. Philadelphia, PA: Presbyterian & Reformed Publishing. ISBN 978-0-875-52350-7. OCLC 2212570.
- ——— (1968). Set Forth Your Case: studies in Christian apologetics. Nutley, NJ: Craig Press. OCLC 183707.
- ——— (1971). Biblical Revelation: The Foundation of Christian Theology. Chicago, IL: Moody Press. OCLC 152351.
- ———; Wells, David F., eds. (1971). Toward a Theology for the Future. Carol Stream, IL: Creation House. OCLC 315210.
- ——— (1972). Live Now, Brother. Chicago, IL: Moody Press. ISBN 978-0802449092.
- ——— (1972). Truth on Fire: The Message of Galatians. Grand Rapids, MI: Baker Book House. ISBN 978-0-801-06927-7. OCLC 532454.
- ———, ed. (1975). Grace Unlimited. Minneapolis, MN: Bethany Fellowship. ISBN 978-0-871-23185-7. OCLC 2053827.
- ——— (1980). Reason Enough: A Case for the Christian Faith. Downers Grove, IL: InterVarsity Press. ISBN 978-0-877-84623-9. OCLC 6319568.
- ——— (1984). The Scripture Principle (1st ed.). San Francisco, CA: Harper & Row. ISBN 978-0-060-66620-0. OCLC 11234500.
- ——— (1985). Three Keys to Spiritual Renewal: A Challenge to the Church (1st ed.). Minneapolis, MN: Bethany Fellowship. ISBN 978-0-871-23656-2.
- ———, ed. (1989). The Grace of God, The Will of Man: A Case For Arminianism. Grand Rapids, MI: Academie Books. ISBN 978-0-310-51231-8. OCLC 18191562.
- ——— (1990). Tracking the Maze: finding our way through modern theology from an Evangelical perspective. San Francisco, CA: Harper & Row. ISBN 978-0-060-66581-4. OCLC 20419452.
- ———; Brown, Delwin, eds. (1990). Theological Crossfire: An Evangelical-Liberal Dialogue. Grand Rapids, MI: Zondervan. ISBN 978-0-310-51441-1. OCLC 22183973.
- ——— (1992). A Wideness in God's Mercy: The Finality of Jesus Christ in a World of Religions. Grand Rapids, MI: Zondervan. ISBN 978-0-310-53591-1. OCLC 24380625.
- ——— (1994). The Openness of God. Downers Grove, IL: InterVarsity Press. ISBN 978-0-830-81852-5. OCLC 30739400.
- ———; Brow, Robert C. (1994). Unbounded Love: A good news theology for the twenty-first century. Carlisle, UK; Downers Grove, IL: Paternoster; InterVarsity Press. ISBN 978-0-830-81853-2. OCLC 30702120.
- ——— (1996). Flame of Love: A Theology of the Holy Spirit. Downers Grove, IL: InterVarsity Press. ISBN 978-0-830-81879-2. OCLC 34669352.
- ——— (1998). Three Keys to Spiritual Renewal: A Challenge to the Church (Reissue ed.). Eugene, OR: Wipf and Stock. ISBN 978-1-579-10101-5.
- ———; Cobb, John B., eds. (2000). Searching for an Adequate God: A Dialogue Between Process and Free Will Theists. Grand Rapids, MI: Eerdmans. ISBN 978-0-802-84739-3. OCLC 43615668.
- ——— (2001). Most Moved Mover: A Theology of God's Openness. Didsbury lectures, 2000. Carlisle UK; Grand Rapids, MI: Paternoster; Baker Books. ISBN 978-0-801-02290-6. OCLC 46319702.
- ———; Callen, Barry L. (2006). The Scripture Principle (Revised ed.). Grand Rapids, MI: Baker Academic. ISBN 978-0-801-03155-7. OCLC 70199915.

=== Articles and chapters ===
- ——— (1989). "Climbing Out of a Swamp: The Evangelical Struggle To Understand the Creation Texts". Interpretation. 43 (2): 143–155. doi:10.1177/002096438904300204. S2CID 143845800.
- ——— (1996). "Conditional". In Crockett, William (ed.). Four Views On Hell. Counterpoints: Bible and Theology (1st ed.). Grand Rapids, MI: Zondervan. - newer edition has differing authors

== Festschrift ==
- Stanley E. Porter and Anthony R. Cross, eds. Semper Reformandum: Studies in Honour of Clark H. Pinnock Carlisle, Cumbria: Paternoster Press, 2003. ISBN 1-84227-206-3

== See also ==
- Open theism
- Annihilationism

== Sources ==
- Strange, Daniel (1999). "Clark H. Pinnock: The Evolution of an Evangelical Maverick". Evangelical Quarterly. 71 (4): 311–326. doi:10.1163/27725472-07104003. S2CID 252304018.
- Studebaker, Steven M. (2010). "Clark H. Pinnock: A Canadian Charismatic Pilgrim". Canadian Journal of Pentecostal-Charismatic Christianity. 1 (1): 1–30.
- Price, Robert M. (1988). "Clark H. Pinnock: Conservative and Contemporary". Evangelical Quarterly. 88 (2): 157–183.
