= Cosmic egg =

Common motif in mythology and cosmogony

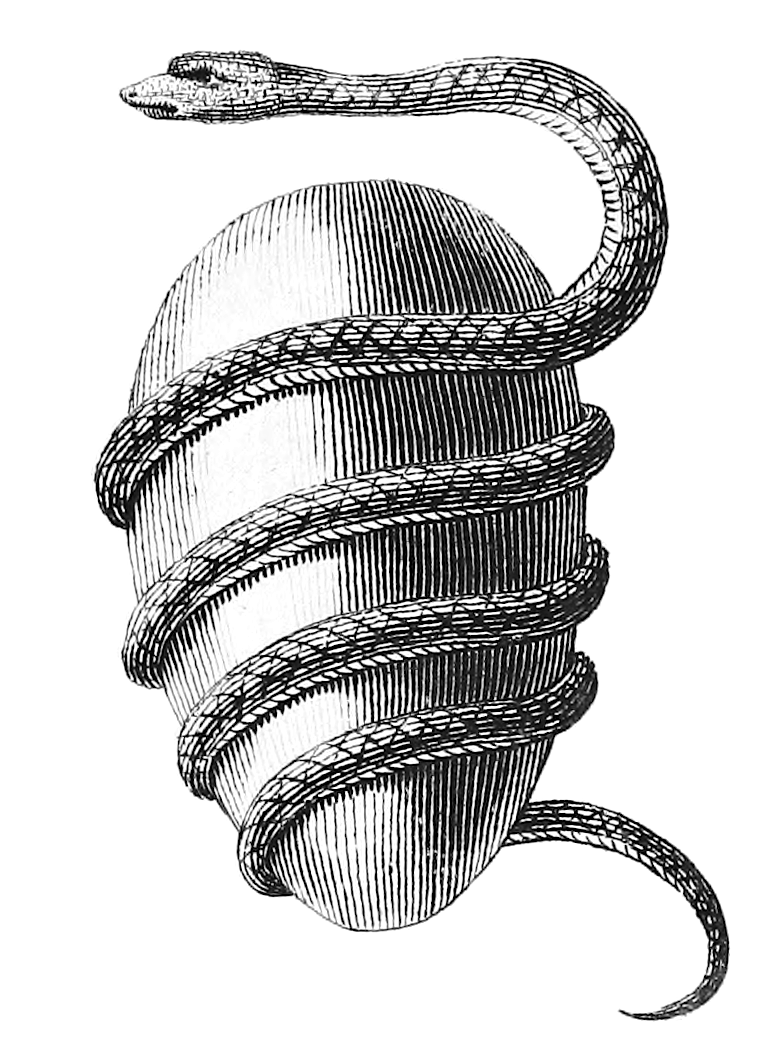
"Snake and world egg of the inhabitants of Tyre", from Jacob Bryant's A New System or Analysis of Ancient Mythology (1774)

The cosmic egg, world egg or mundane egg is a mythological motif found in the cosmogonies of many cultures and civilizations, including in Proto-Indo-European mythology. Typically, there is an egg which, upon "hatching", either gives rise to the universe itself or gives rise to a primordial being who, in turn, creates the universe. The egg is sometimes lain on the primordial waters of the Earth. Typically, the upper half of the egg, or its outer shell, becomes the heaven (firmament) and the lower half, or the inner yolk, becomes the Earth. The motif likely stems from simple elements of an egg, including its ability to offer nourishment and give rise to new life, as is reflected by the Latin proverb omne vivum ex ovo ('all life comes from an egg').

The term "cosmic egg" is also used in the modern study of cosmology in the context of emergent Universe scenarios.

== Examples by region ==
=== Africa ===
==== West Africa ====
In Dogon mythology from Burkina Faso, the creator-god Amma takes the form of an egg. The egg is divided into four sections representing the four elements: air, fire, water, and earth. This also establishes the four cardinal directions. Failing to create the Earth on her first attempt, Amma plants a seed in herself that forms two placentas, containing a pair of twins. One twin, Ogo, breaks out and unsuccessfully tries to create a universe. Amma however is able to create the Earth now from a part of Ogo's placenta. Ogo's twin, Nommo, is killed by Amma and parts of the body are scattered across the world to give it order. The parts were then reconstituted to revive Nommo. Nommo creates four spirits that become the ancestors of the Dogon people. These spirits are sent with Nommo into an ark to populate the world.

The creation account proceeds as follows:

In the beginning, Amma dogon, alone, was in the shape of an egg: the four collar bones were fused, dividing the egg into air, earth, fire, and water, establishing also the four cardinal directions. Within this cosmic egg was the material and the structure of the universe, and the 266 signs that embraced the essence of all things. The first creation of the world by Amma was, however, a failure. The second creation began when Amma planted a seed within herself, a seed that resulted in the shape of man. But in the process of its gestation, there was a flaw, meaning that the universe would now have within it the possibilities for incompleteness. Now the egg became two placentas, each containing a set of twins, male and female. After sixty years, one of the males, Ogo, broke out of the placenta and attempted to create his own universe, in opposition to that being created by Amma. But he was unable to say the words that would bring such a universe into being. He then descended, as Amma transformed into the earth the fragment of placenta that went with Ogo into the void. Ogo interfered with the creative potential of the earth by having incestuous relations with it. His counterpart, Nommo, a participant in the revolt, was then killed by Amma, the parts of his body cast in all directions, bringing a sense of order to the world. When, five days later, Amma brought the pieces of Nommo's body together, restoring him to life, Nommo became ruler of the universe. He created four spirits, the ancestors of the Dogon people; Amma sent Nommo and the spirits to earth in an ark, and so the earth was restored. Along the way, Nommo uttered the words of Amma, and the sacred words that create were made available to humans. In the meantime, Ogo was transformed by Amma into Yuguru, the Pale Fox, who would always be alone, always be incomplete, eternally in revolt, ever wandering the earth seeking his female soul.

=== Asia ===
==== China ====
Various versions of the cosmic egg myth are related to the creator, Pangu. Heaven and earth are said to have originally existed in a formless state, like the egg of a chicken. The egg opens and unfolds after 18,000 years: the light part rose to become heaven and the heavy part sank to become the earth. A version of this myth deriving from the Zhejiang Province holds that Pangu, experiencing discomfort in being contained in a dark and stuffy egg, shatters it into pieces, after which heaven and earth form by the same process (with the addition that parts of the shell then form the sun, moon, and stars).

==== India ====
In one Vedic myth recorded in the Jaiminīya Brāhmaṇa, the earliest phase of the cosmos involves a primordial ocean out of which an egg arose. Once the egg split, it began the process of forming heaven (out of the upper part) and earth (out of the lower part) over the course of one hundred divine years. Another text, the Śatapatha Brāhmaṇa, also has the sequence of a primordial ocean and then an egg, but this time, the god Prajapati emerges from the egg after one year. He creates the cosmos and then the gods and antigods from his speech and breath. The Rigveda speaks of a golden embryo (called the hiraṇyagarbha) which is located on a "high waters" out of which all else develops. Finally, a version of the story appears in the Chāndogya Upaniṣad.

Vivasvan, Rahu, Bhūmi, Naraka, Ananta, Garbhodaksayi Vishnu

This is one of many material universes, Brahmandas, which expand from Mahavishnu when He breathes.

==== Japan ====
In the Nihon Shoki, a chaotic state existed at the beginning that was in the shape of an egg.

=== Europe ===
==== Finland ====
In the Kalevala, the national epic of Finland, there is a myth of the world being created from the fragments of an egg. The goddess of the air, Ilmatar, longed to have a son. To achieve this, she and the East Wind make love until she conceives Väinämöinen, the child of the wind. However, she was not able to give birth to her child. A pochard swooped down and impregnated her: as a result, six golden cosmic eggs were birthed or laid, as well as an iron egg. The pochard took these eggs for himself and protected them by sitting on them, but this came with sitting on Ilmatar as well. Upon the movement of the air goddess, they rolled into the sea and the shell broke: the fragments formed heaven, earth, the sun, moon, stars, and (from the iron egg) a thundercloud.

The following is the translation of the part of the text describing the formation of the cosmos from the fragments of the egg, published by William Forsell Kirby in 1906:

In the ooze they were not wasted,
Nor the fragments in the water,
But a wondrous change came o'er them,
And the fragments all grew lovely.
From the cracked egg's lower fragment,
Now the solid earth was fashioned,
From the cracked egg's upper fragment,
Rose the lofty arch of heaven,
From the yolk, the upper portion,
Now became the sun's bright lustre;
From the white, the upper portion,
Rose the moon that shines so brightly;
Whatso in the egg was mottled,
Now became the stars in heaven,
Whatso in the egg was blackish,
In the air as cloudlets floated.

=== Mediterranean ===
==== Egypt ====
The ancient Egyptians accepted multiple creation myths as valid, including those of the Hermopolitan, Heliopolitan, and Memphite theologies. The cosmic egg myth can be found from Hermopolitus. Although the site, located in Middle Egypt, currently sports a name deriving from the name of the god Hermes, the ancient Egyptians called it Khemnu, or “Eight-Town.” The number eight, in turn, refers to the Ogdoad, a group of eight gods who are the main characters in the Hermopolitan creation myth. Four of these gods are male, and have the heads of frogs, and the other four are female with the heads of serpents. These eight existed in the primordial, chaotic water that pre-existed the rest of creation. At some point these eight gods, in one way or another, bring about the formation of a cosmic egg, although variants of the myth describe the origins of the egg in different ways. In any case, the egg in turn gives rise to the deity who forms the rest of the world as well as the first land to arise out of the primordial waters, called the primeval mound. When the mound appeared, a lotus blossom bloomed to signal the birth of the sun god, after which the formation of the rest of creation could finally proceed.

==== Greece and Italy ====
Ideas similar to the cosmic egg myth are mentioned in two different sources from Greek and Roman mythology. One is in the Roman author Marcus Terentius Varro, living in the 1st century BC. According to Varro, heaven and earth can respectively be likened to an egg shell and its yolk. The air, in turn, is represented by the moisture functioning as a form of humidity between the shell and yolk. The second mention is found in the Clementine Recognitions 10:17, although from an oppositional standpoint, insofar as Clement is portrayed as summarizing and ridiculing the Orphic cosmogony: according to the description given, there is a primordial Chaos which, over time, solidified into an egg. As is with an egg, a creature began to grow inside, until at some point it broke open to produce an androgynous human named Phanetas (error for Phanes). When Phanetas appeared, a light shone forth that resulted in "substance, prudence, motion, and coitus," and these in turn resulted in the creation of the heavens and the earth. The Clementine Recognitions 10:30 presents, then, a second summary of the idea, this time attributed to the cosmogony of Orpheus as described by a "good pagan" named Niceta. This summary, in contrast to the first one, is presented in a serious manner. This myth appears to have had occasional influence, insofar as a manuscript of it is associated with the reappearance of the idea at a library of Saint Gall in a 9th-century commentary on Boethius. Another three appearances occur again in the twelfth century.

=== Middle East ===
==== Iran ====
In Zoroastrian cosmography, the sky was considered to be spherical with an outer boundary (called a parkān), an idea that likely goes back to the Sumerians. The Earth is also spherical and exists within the spherical sky. To help convey this cosmology, a number of ancient writers, including Empedocles, came up with the analogy of an egg: the outer spherical and bounded sky is like the outer shell, whereas the Earth is represented by the inner round yolk within. This analogy, in turn, is found in a number of Zoroastrian texts, including the Selections of Zadspram.

== Modern representations ==
=== Literature ===
In 1955 poet and writer Robert Graves published the mythography The Greek Myths, a compendium of Greek mythology normally published in two volumes. Within this work Graves' imaginatively reconstructed "Pelasgian creation myth" features a supreme creatrix, Eurynome, "The Goddess of All Things", who arose naked from Chaos to part sea from sky so that she could dance upon the waves. Catching the north wind at her back and, rubbing it between her hands, she warms the pneuma and spontaneously generates the serpent Ophion, who mates with her. In the form of a dove upon the waves, she lays the Cosmic Egg and bids Ophion to incubate it by coiling seven times around until it splits in two and hatches "all things that exist... sun, moon, planets, stars, the earth with its mountains and rivers, its trees, herbs, and living creatures".

In Arthur C. Clarke's Rendezvous with Rama, the eponymous spacecraft Rama is referred to as a possible "cosmic egg" by humanity considering its emergence within the Solar System.

=== Film ===
The ending of Stanley Kubrick’s film 2001: A Space Odyssey depicts the rebirth of humanity as a journey from beyond infinity back to earth in the form of a cosmic human embryo (or “Star Child”).

=== Cosmology ===
As the concept of a true singularity came under increasing criticism, alternative nonsingular "cosmic egg" (emergent Universe) scenarios started being developed.

- In 1913, Vesto Slipher published his observations that light from remote galaxies was redshifted, which was gradually accepted as meaning that all galaxies (except Andromeda) are receding from the Earth.
- Alexander Friedmann predicted the same consequence in 1922 from Einstein's equations of general relativity, once the previous ad-hoc cosmological constant was removed from it (which had been inserted to conform to the preconceived eternal, static universe).
- Georges Lemaître proposed in 1927 that the cosmos originated from what he called the primeval atom.
- Edwin Hubble observationally confirmed Lemaître's findings two years later, in 1929.
- In the late 1940s, George Gamow's assistant cosmological researcher Ralph Alpher, proposed the name ylem for the primordial substance that existed between the Big Crunch of the previous universe and the Big Bang of our own universe. Ylem is closely related to the concept of supersymmetry.

== See also ==
- Ancient near eastern cosmology
- Brahma
- Brahman
- Brahmanda
- Comparative Mythology
- Hiranyagarbha
- Phanes

== Sources ==
- Alcock, John P. (2007). "The Egg: its Symbolism and Mythology". In Hosking, Richard (ed.). Eggs in Cookery: Proceedings of the Oxford Symposium of Food and Cookery 2006. Prospect Books. pp. 20–29.
- Bailey, Harold W. (1943). Zoroastrian Problems In The Ninth Century Books. Clarendon Press.
- Brewer, E. Cobham (1894). "Mundane Egg". Dictionary of Phrase and Fable.
- Dronke (1974). Fabula: Explorations into the Uses of Myth in Medieval Platonism. Brill.
- Griaule, Marcel; Dieterlen, Germaine (1965). Le renard pale. Continuum Foundation.
- Lynch, Patricia Ann; Roberts, Jeremy (2010). African Mythology, A to Z. Infobase Holdings.
- Panaino, Antonio C.D. (2019). A Walk through the Iranian Heavens: Spherical and Non-Spherical Cosmographic Models in the Imagination of Ancient Iran and Its Neighbors. Brill.
- Scheub, Harold (2000). A dictionary of African mythology: the mythmaker as storyteller. Oxford University Press. ISBN 978-0-19-512456-9.
- The Kalevala: Epic of the Finnish people. Translated by Friberg, Eino (4th ed.). Otava Publishing Company, Ltd. 1998. p. 44. ISBN 951-1-10137-4.
- Witzel, E.J. Michael (2012). The Origin of the World's Mythologies. Oxford University Press.
- Yang, Lihui; An, Deming (2005). Handbook of Chinese Mythology. ABC-CLIO.
