= Temporal finitism =

Doctrine that time is finite in the past

Temporal finitism is the doctrine that time is finite in the past. The philosophy of Aristotle, expressed in such works as his Physics, held that although space was finite, with only void existing beyond the outermost sphere of the heavens, time was infinite. This caused problems for mediaeval Islamic, Jewish, and Christian philosophers who, primarily creationist, were unable to reconcile the Aristotelian conception of the eternal with the Genesis creation narrative.

== Medieval background ==
In contrast to ancient Greek philosophers who believed that the universe had an infinite past with no beginning, medieval philosophers and theologians developed the concept of the universe having a finite past with a beginning. This view was inspired by the creation myth shared by the three Abrahamic religions: Judaism, Christianity and Islam.

Prior to Maimonides, it was held that it was possible to prove, philosophically, creation theory. The Kalam cosmological argument held that creation was provable, for example. Maimonides himself held that neither creation nor Aristotle's infinite time were provable, or at least that no proof was available. (According to scholars of his work, he didn't make a formal distinction between unprovability and the simple absence of proof.) Thomas Aquinas was influenced by this belief, and held in his Summa Theologica that neither hypothesis was demonstrable. Some of Maimonides' Jewish successors, including Gersonides and Crescas, conversely held that the question was decidable, philosophically.

John Philoponus was probably the first to use the argument that infinite time is impossible in order to establish temporal finitism. He was followed by many others including St. Bonaventure.

Philoponus' arguments for temporal finitism were severalfold. Contra Aristotlem has been lost, and is chiefly known through the citations used by Simplicius of Cilicia in his commentaries on Aristotle's Physics and De Caelo. Philoponus' refutation of Aristotle extended to six books, the first five addressing De Caelo and the sixth addressing Physics, and from comments on Philoponus made by Simplicius can be deduced to have been quite lengthy.

A full exposition of Philoponus' several arguments, as reported by Simplicius, can be found in Sorabji.

One such argument was based upon Aristotle's own theorem that there were not multiple infinities, and ran as follows: If time were infinite, then as the universe continued in existence for another hour, the infinity of its age since creation at the end of that hour must be one hour greater than the infinity of its age since creation at the start of that hour. But since Aristotle holds that such treatments of infinity are impossible and ridiculous, the world cannot have existed for infinite time.

The most sophisticated medieval arguments against an infinite past were later developed by the early Muslim philosopher, Al-Kindi (Alkindus); the Jewish philosopher, Saadia Gaon (Saadia ben Joseph); and the Muslim theologian, Al-Ghazali (Algazel). They developed two logical arguments against an infinite past, the first being the "argument from the impossibility of the existence of an actual infinite", which states:

"An actual infinite cannot exist."
"An infinite temporal regress of events is an actual infinite."
"Thus an infinite temporal regress of events cannot exist."

This argument depends on the (unproved) assertion that an actual infinite cannot exist; and that an infinite past implies an infinite succession of "events", a word not clearly defined. The second argument, the "argument from the impossibility of completing an actual infinite by successive addition", states:

"An actual infinite cannot be completed by successive addition."
"The temporal series of past events has been completed by successive addition."
"Thus the temporal series of past events cannot be an actual infinite."

The first statement states, correctly, that a finite (number) cannot be made into an infinite one by the finite addition of more finite numbers. The second skirts around this; the analogous idea in mathematics, that the (infinite) sequence of negative integers "..-3, -2, -1" may be extended by appending zero, then one, and so forth; is perfectly valid.

Both arguments were adopted by later Christian philosophers and theologians, and the second argument in particular became more famous after it was adopted by Immanuel Kant in his thesis of the first antinomy concerning time.

== Modern revival ==
Immanuel Kant's argument for temporal finitism from his First Antinomy, runs as follows:

If we assume that the world has no beginning in time, then up to every given moment an eternity has elapsed, and there has passed away in that world an infinite series of successive states of things. Now the infinity of a series consists in the fact that it can never be completed through successive synthesis. It thus follows that it is impossible for an infinite world-series to have passed away, and that a beginning of the world is therefore a necessary condition of the world's existence.

— Immanuel Kant, First Antinomy, of Space and Time

Modern mathematics generally incorporates infinity. For most purposes it is simply used as convenient; when considered more carefully it is incorporated, or not, according to whether the axiom of infinity is included. This is the mathematical concept of infinity; while this may provide useful analogies or ways of thinking about the physical world, it says nothing directly about the physical world. Georg Cantor recognized two different kinds of infinity. The first, used in calculus, he called the variable finite, or potential infinite, represented by the $\infty$ sign (known as the lemniscate), and the actual infinite, which Cantor called the "true infinite." His notion of transfinite arithmetic became the standard system for working with infinity within set theory. David Hilbert thought that the role of the actual infinite was relegated only to the abstract realm of mathematics. "The infinite is nowhere to be found in reality. It neither exists in nature nor provides a legitimate basis for rational thought... The role that remain for the infinite to play is solely that of an idea." Philosopher William Lane Craig argues that if the past were infinitely long, it would entail the existence of actual infinites in reality.

Craig and Sinclair also argue that an actual infinite cannot be formed by successive addition. Quite independent of the absurdities arising from an actual infinite number of past events, the formation of an actual infinite has its own problems. For any finite number n, n+1 equals a finite number. An actual infinity has no immediate predecessor.

The Tristram Shandy paradox is an attempt to illustrate the absurdity of an infinite past. Imagine Tristram Shandy, an immortal man who writes his biography so slowly that for every day that he lives, it takes him a year to record that day. Suppose that Shandy had always existed. Since there is a one-to-one correspondence between the number of past days and the number of past years on an infinite past, one could reason that Shandy could write his entire autobiography. From another perspective, Shandy would only get farther and farther behind, and given a past eternity, would be infinitely far behind.

Craig asks us to suppose that we met a man who claims to have been counting down from infinity and is now just finishing. We could ask why he did not finish counting yesterday or the day before, since eternity would have been over by then. In fact for any day in the past, if the man would have finished his countdown by day n, he would have finished his countdown by n-1. It follows that the man could not have finished his countdown at any point in the finite past, since he would have already been done.

== Input from physicists ==
In 1984 physicist Paul Davies deduced a finite-time origin of the universe in a quite different way, from physical grounds: "the universe will eventually die, wallowing, as it were, in its own entropy. This is known among physicists as the 'heat death' of the universe... The universe cannot have existed for ever, otherwise it would have reached its equilibrium end state an infinite time ago. Conclusion: the universe did not always exist."

More recently though physicists have proposed various ideas for how the universe could have existed for an infinite time, such as eternal inflation. But in 2012, Alexander Vilenkin and Audrey Mithani of Tufts University wrote a paper claiming that in any such scenario past time could not have been infinite. It could however have been "before any nameable time", according to Leonard Susskind. There are also very exotic but consistent physical scenarios under which the Universe has existed in eternity.

== Critical reception ==
Kant's argument for finitism has been widely discussed, for instance Jonathan Bennett points out that Kant's argument is not a sound logical proof: His assertion that "Now the infinity of a series consists in the fact that it can never be completed through successive synthesis. It thus follows that it is impossible for an infinite world-series to have passed away", assumes that the universe was created at a beginning and then progressed from there, which seems to assume the conclusion. A universe that simply existed and had not been created, or a universe that was created as an infinite progression, for instance, would still be possible. Bennett quotes Strawson:

"A temporal process both completed and infinite in duration appears to be impossible only on the assumption that it has a beginning. If ... it is urged that we cannot conceive of a process of surveying which does not have a beginning, then we must inquire with what relevance and by what right the notion of surveying is introduced into the discussion at all."

Some of the criticism of William Lane Craig's argument for temporal finitism has been discussed and expanded on by Stephen Puryear.

In this, he writes Craig's argument as:

1. If the universe did not have a beginning, then the past would consist in an infinite temporal sequence of events.
2. An infinite temporal sequence of past events would be actually and not merely potentially infinite.
3. It is impossible for a sequence formed by successive addition to be actually infinite.
4. The temporal sequence of past events was formed by successive addition.
5. Therefore, the universe had a beginning.

Puryear points out that Aristotle and Aquinas had an opposing view to point 2, but that the most contentious is point 3. Puryear says that many philosophers have disagreed with point 3, and adds his own objection:

"Consider the fact that things move from one point in space to another. In so doing, the moving object passes through an actual infinity of intervening points. Hence, motion involves traversing an actual infinite ... Accordingly, the finitist of this stripe must be mistaken. Similarly, whenever some period of time elapses, an actual infinite has been traversed, namely, the actual infinity of instants that make up that period of time."

Puryear then points out that Craig has defended his position by saying that time might or must be naturally divided and so there is not an actual infinity of instants between two times. Puryear then goes on to argue that if Craig is willing to turn an infinity of points into a finite number of divisions, then points 1, 2 and 4 are not true.

An article by Louis J. Swingrover makes a number of points relating to the idea that Craig's "absurdities" are not contradictions in themselves: they are all either mathematically consistent (like Hilbert's hotel or the man counting down to today), or do not lead to inescapable conclusions. He argues that if one makes the assumption that any mathematically coherent model is metaphysically possible, then it can be shown that an infinite temporal chain is metaphysically possible, since one can show that there exist mathematically coherent models of an infinite progression of times. He also says that Craig might be making a cardinality error similar to assuming that because an infinitely extended temporal series would contain an infinite number of times, then it would have to contain the number "infinity".

Quentin Smith attacks "their supposition that an infinite series of past events must contain some events separated from the present event by an infinite number of intermediate events, and consequently that from one of these infinitely distant past events the present could never have been reached".

Smith asserts that Craig and Wiltrow are making a cardinality error by confusing an unending sequence with a sequence whose members must be separated by an infinity: None of the integers is separated from any other integer by an infinite number of integers, so why assert that an infinite series of times must contain a time infinitely far back in the past.

Smith then says that Craig uses false presuppositions when he makes statements about infinite collections (in particular the ones relating to Hilbert's Hotel and infinite sets being equivalent to proper subsets of them), often based on Craig finding things "unbelievable", when they are actually mathematically correct. He also points out that the Tristram Shandy paradox is mathematically coherent, but some of Craig's conclusions about when the biography would be finished are incorrect.

Ellery Eells expands on this last point by showing that the Tristram Shandy paradox is internally consistent and fully compatible with an infinite universe.

Graham Oppy embroiled in debate with Oderberg, points out that the Tristram Shandy story has been used in many versions. For it to be useful to the temporal finitism side, a version must be found that is logically consistent and not compatible with an infinite universe. To see this, note that the argument runs as follows:

1. If an infinite past is possible, then the Tristram Shandy story must be possible
2. The Tristram Shandy story leads to contradiction.
3. Therefore, an infinite past is not possible.

The problem for the finitist is that point 1 is not necessarily true. If a version of the Tristram Shandy story is internally inconsistent, for instance, then the infinitist could just assert that an infinite past is possible, but that particular Tristram Shandy is not because it's not internally consistent. Oppy then lists the different versions of the Tristram Shandy story that have been put forward and shows that they are all either internally inconsistent or they don't lead to contradiction.
