= The Kalām Cosmological Argument =

1979 book by William Lane Craig

- Cover of the first edition
- Author: William Lane Craig
- Language: English
- Subject: Kalam cosmological argument
- Publisher: Barnes & Noble, New York
- Publication date: 1979
- Publication place: United States
- Media type: Print
- Pages: 216
- ISBN: 0-06-491308-2

The Kalām Cosmological Argument is a 1979 book by the philosopher William Lane Craig, in which the author offers a contemporary defense of the Kalām cosmological argument and argues for the existence of God, with an emphasis on the alleged metaphysical impossibility of an infinite regress of past events. First, Craig argues that the universe began to exist, using two philosophical and two scientific arguments. Second, Craig argues that whatever begins to exist has a cause that caused it to begin to exist. Finally, Craig argues that this cause is a personal creator who changelessly and independently willed the beginning of the universe.

== Contents ==
The book is divided into two parts.

- Part I: Al-Kindi, Saadia and Al-Ghazali.
- Part II: A modern defence of the Kalām cosmological argument. (Contains two appendices)
  - Appendix 1: The Kalām cosmological argument and Zeno's paradoxes.
  - Appendix 2: The Kalām cosmological argument and the thesis of Kant's first antinomy.

Part I provides a brief history of the Kalām cosmological argument as stated by the Kalām tradition, with special attention to al-Kindi, Saadia and al-Ghāzāli. Part II moves to defend in length the substance of the argument.

=== Basic argument ===
1. Whatever begins to exist, has a cause of its existence (i.e. something has caused it to start existing).
2. The universe began to exist. i.e., the temporal regress of events is finite.
3. Therefore, the universe has a cause.

Following Al-Ghāzāli, Craig argues that this cause must be a personal will.

=== First sub-set of arguments ===
Argument based on the impossibility of an actual infinite:

1. An actual infinite cannot exist.
2. An infinite temporal regress of events is an actual infinite.
3. Therefore, an infinite temporal regress of events cannot exist.

=== Second sub-set of arguments ===
Argument based on the impossibility of the formation of an actual infinite by successive addition:

1. A collection formed by successive addition cannot be an actual infinite.
2. The temporal series of past events is a collection formed by successive addition.
3. Therefore, the temporal series of past events cannot be actually infinite.

The first is that a) an actual infinite cannot exist in the real world; and b) an infinite temporal series is such an actual infinite.

The second is that a temporal series cannot be an actual infinite, assuming than an actual infinite can exist in the real world, because: a) a temporal series is a collection formed by successive addition; and b) a collection formed by successive addition cannot be an actual infinite.

== Editions ==
1. The Kalām Cosmological Argument. London: Macmillan Press. 1979. ISBN 9780333248096.
2. The Kalām Cosmological Argument. New York: Barnes & Noble. 1979. ISBN 9780064913089.
3. The Kalām Cosmological Argument. Eugene: Wipf and Stock. 2000. ISBN 9781579104382.

== See also ==
- In Quest of the Historical Adam: A Biblical and Scientific Exploration
