= Kalam cosmological argument =

Philosophical argument for the existence of God

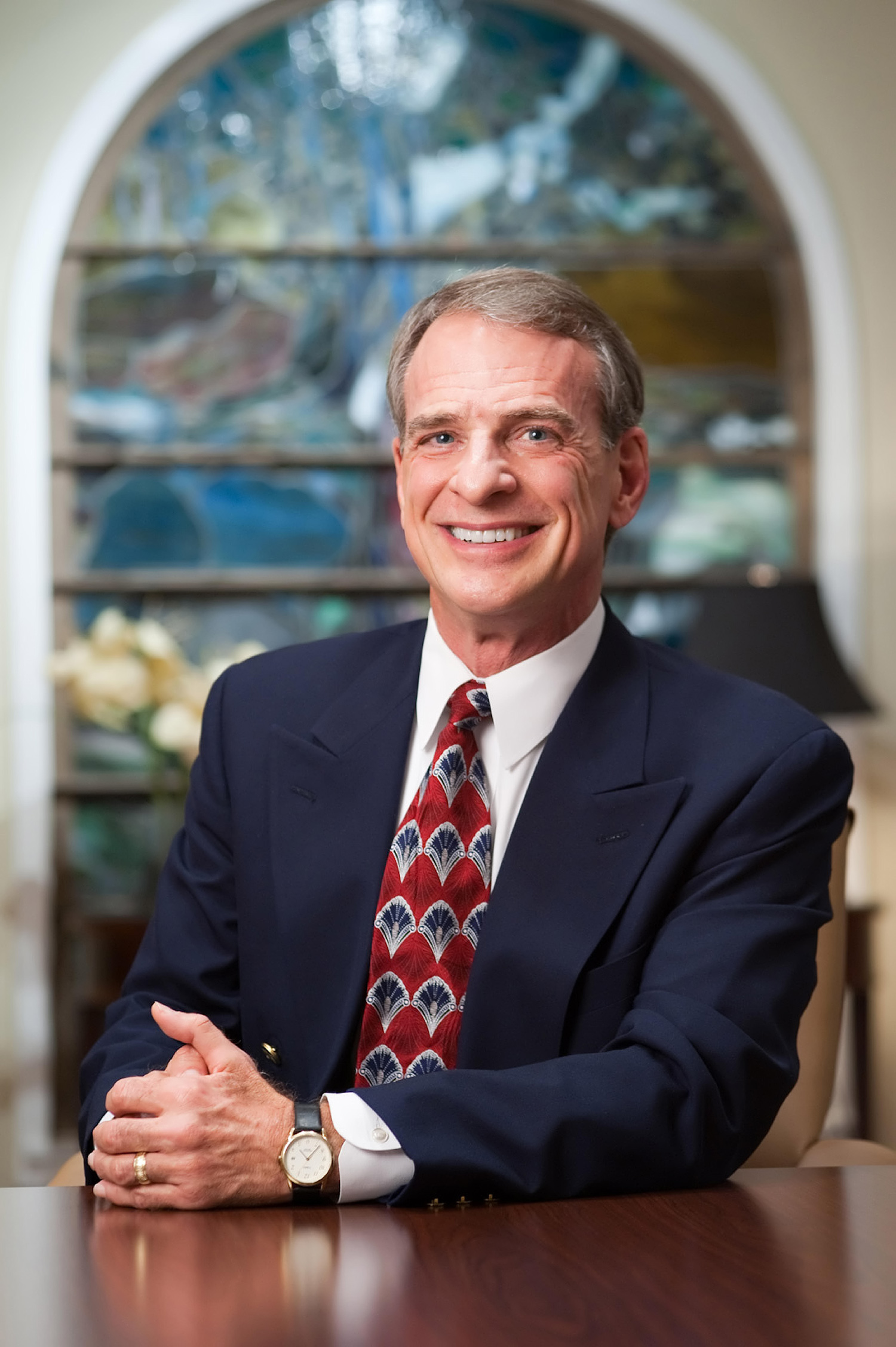
William Lane Craig (born 1949), whose publications and debates popularised the Kalam cosmological argument

The Kalam cosmological argument is a modern formulation of the cosmological argument for the existence of God, named after Kalam—or medieval Islamic scholasticism—from which many of its foundational ideas originated. Philosopher and theologian William Lane Craig was principally responsible for revitalising these ideas for modern academic discourse through his book The Kalām Cosmological Argument (1979), as well as other publications.

The argument's central thesis is the finitude of the past, which illustrates that the universe, including time itself, had a definitive beginning. This structural principle is rooted in the impossibility of an infinite temporal regress, or beginningless past, distinguishing it from other cosmological arguments, such as Aquinas's Second Way, which rests on the impossibility of an infinite causal regress, and those of Leibniz and Samuel Clarke, which refer to the principle of sufficient reason. Modern discourse incorporates both philosophy and science, encompassing such fields as cosmology, quantum mechanics, philosophy of science, relativistic physics and philosophy of time.

Since Craig's original publication, the Kalam cosmological argument has elicited public debate between Craig and Graham Oppy, Adolf Grünbaum, J. L. Mackie and Quentin Smith, and has been incorporated into Christian apologetics. According to Michael Martin, the cosmological arguments presented by Craig, Bruce Reichenbach and Richard Swinburne are "among the most sophisticated and well-argued in contemporary theological philosophy".

== Form of the argument ==
The most prominent form of the Kalam cosmological argument, as defended by William Lane Craig, is expressed in two parts, as an initial syllogism followed by further philosophical analysis.

=== Initial syllogism ===
The Kalam cosmological argument is a deductive argument. Therefore, if its premises are true, the conclusion follows necessarily.

1. Premise 1: Everything that begins to exist has a cause.
2. Premise 2: The universe began to exist.
3. Conclusion 1: Therefore, the universe has a cause.

=== Conceptual analysis of the cause ===
Craig argues that the cause of the universe necessarily embodies specific properties, in being:

- Uncaused, otherwise an infinite regress of causes would arise.
- Timeless (therefore changeless), spaceless, immaterial and enormously powerful, in creating spacetime and its contents ex nihilo.
- Personal, possessing non-deterministic agency, in creating the universe from a timeless state (without prior determining conditions).
- Singular, per Occam's razor, in the absence of good reasons to believe in the existence of more than one uncaused cause.

Based upon this analysis, he appends a further premise and conclusion:

4. Premise 3: If the universe has a cause, then an uncaused, personal Creator of the universe exists who sans (without) the universe is beginningless, changeless, immaterial, timeless, spaceless and enormously powerful.
5. Conclusion 2: (from 3 and 4) Therefore, an uncaused, personal Creator of the universe exists, who sans the universe is beginningless, changeless, immaterial, timeless, spaceless and enormously powerful.

Craig appraises the theological significance of the final conclusion:

... our whole universe was caused to exist by something beyond it and greater than it. For it is no secret that one of the most important conceptions of what theists mean by 'God' is Creator of heaven and earth.

== Historical background ==
The origins of the cosmological argument can be traced to classical antiquity, rooted in the concept of the prime mover, introduced by Aristotle. In the 6th century, Syriac Christian theologian John Philoponus (c. 490 – c. 570) presented the first known version of the argument based on the impossibility of an infinite temporal regress, postulating that time itself must have had a beginning.

Like other early Christian commentators, Philoponus disputed the Greek doctrine of the eternity of matter, noting that this was inconsistent with the Judeo-Christian doctrine of creatio ex nihilo. Furthermore, he examined the contradiction between Greek conceptions of past eternity and Aristotle's repudiation of the existence of actual infinities. In 529, he presented his critique, On the Eternity of the World Against Proclus, categorising arguments for the finitude of the past, which underpinned his arguments for the existence of God.

Philoponus's ideas were further developed and debated within medieval Islamic scholasticism—or kalam—through the 9th and 12th centuries, especially by Al-Ghazali in the 11th century and later criticised by Ibn Rushd in the 12th. In his landmark thesis, The Incoherence of the Philosophers, Persian Muslim theologian Al-Ghazali characterised the absurdity of a beginningless universe and of the existence of actual infinities, articulating a prototypical formulation of the modern Kalam cosmological argument:

Every being which begins has a cause for its beginning; now the world is a being which begins;

therefore, it possesses a cause for its beginning.

In the 13th century, the cosmological argument was introduced to medieval Christian theology, wherein it would be examined by St. Bonaventure as well as Thomas Aquinas in his Summa Theologica (I, q.2, a.3) and Summa Contra Gentiles (I, 13). Conceptions of temporal finitism that had been substantiated in Philoponus's—and later, Al-Ghazali's—writings inspired energetic debate between Aquinas and Bonaventure, as well as further generations of scholars up until the 18th century. Craig writes:

It finally sputtered to something of an inconclusive end in the thought of the great German philosopher Immanuel Kant in the 18th century. Kant held, ironically, that there are rationally compelling arguments for both [the finitude and infinitude of the past], so that the problem is insoluble and exposes the bankruptcy of reason itself.

== Contemporary discourse ==
According to Quentin Smith:

A count of the articles in the philosophy journals shows that more articles have been published about Craig's defense of the Kalam argument than have been published about any other philosopher's contemporary formulation of an argument for God's existence.

The Kalam cosmological argument has received criticism from philosophers such as J. L. Mackie, Graham Oppy, Adolf Grunbaum, Michael Martin, Quentin Smith, Wes Morriston and Alex Malpass as well as physicists Sean M. Carroll, Lawrence Krauss and Victor Stenger.

Modern discourse encompasses the fields of both philosophy and science (e.g. the fields of quantum physics and cosmology), which Bruce Reichenbach summarises as:

... whether there needs to be a cause of the first natural existent, whether something like the universe can be finite and yet not have a beginning, and the nature of infinities and their connection with reality.

Since the temporal ordering of events is central, the Kalam argument also brings issues of the nature of time into the discussion.

== Premise one: philosophical perspectives ==
Premise one: "Everything that begins to exist has a cause."

In the Blackwell Companion to Natural Theology, Craig and James Sinclair offer three reasons in support of the causal premise:

1. Rational intuition: The first premise originates in the metaphysical first principle that "something cannot come into being from nothing", classically expressed as the Parmenidean Causal Principle that "from nothing, nothing comes" (ex nihilo nihil fit). They define this category of knowledge as self-evident, postulating that it is understood a priori through the faculty of rational intuition.
2. Reductio ad absurdum: If false, it would be inexplicable why anything and everything does not spontaneously come into existence without a cause. Scientific inquiry would become unintelligible, yielding absurd, random outputs.
3. Inductive reasoning from common experience and scientific evidence, which consistently verify and never falsify the causal premise. Craig emphasises the Causal Principle's indispensibility in science, including cosmogonic models aimed at averting a beginning of the universe, which assume methodologically that effects are contingent on prior causal conditions.

=== Intuition and induction ===
Graham Oppy, J. L. Mackie and Wes Morriston object to the intuitive foundation of the first premise. Oppy states:

Mackie, [Adolf] Grunbaum, [Quentin] Smith and I—among many others—have taken issue with the first premise: why should it be supposed that absolutely everything which begins to exist has a cause for its beginning to exist?

Mackie derives from common experience that all causation is confined to rearrangements of existing matter, therefore cannot apply to the ex nihilo origin of all matter. He appeals to David Hume's conceivability argument, contending that uncaused instantiations are logically possible, provided they can be conceived without contradiction in the mind. Craig responds that a generative mechanism, or efficient cause, must be necessary to effect the emergence of the universe, even if a material substrate, or material cause, is absent at the point of origin. He notes that Hume himself affirmed the Causal Principle consistently throughout his Enquiry and in correspondence, denying only its intuitive foundations. Bruce Reichenbach protests that Mackie's argument confuses visual imagination for logical possibility:

... someone who fails to understand a necessarily true proposition might conceive of it being false, but from this it does not follow that it possibly is false. A person might think (wrongly) that pi is a determinate [finite decimal] number, but it does not follow that it is so. In the phenomenology of conceivability, what is really conceivable is difficult if not impossible to differentiate from what some might think is conceivable. And even if something is conceivable, say in a logical sense, it does not follow that it is factually possible.

Adolf Grünbaum pronounces the causal principle to be meaningful only within temporal sequences, therefore inapplicable to the first moment of time where there is no prior temporality for causation to transpire. Similarly, Morriston remarks that the intuitive knowledge we have of cause and effect, in the context of events within time and space, do not hold true for the very beginning of time:

We have no experience of the origin of worlds to tell us that worlds don't come into existence like that. We don't even have experience of the coming into being of anything remotely analogous to the 'initial singularity' that figures in the Big Bang theory of the origin of the universe.

Craig stipulates that causal laws are not physical laws, but unrestricted metaphysical truths that are prior to the very conceptions of space and time, applying irrespective of temporality. Correspondingly, he distinguishes temporal priority from causal priority, determining that a cause can be both simultaneous with and causally prior to the first moment of time. He reflects:

The history of twentieth century astrophysical cosmology belies Morriston's claim that people have no strong intuitions about the need of a causal explanation of the origin of time and the universe.

== Premise one: scientific perspectives ==
=== Quantum indeterminacy ===
Paul Davies is unconvinced that the Causal Principle can be defined consistently in fundamental physics. He adopts the phenomenon of quantum indeterminacy as a direct challenge to deterministic conceptions of cause and effect, deriving that subatomic physics is grounded in mechanisms that are intrinsically non-deterministic in nature. Craig responds that the first premise is independent of a determinist construal of causality. Though indeterminism undercuts the proposition that "every event" has a cause, he maintains it is consistent with the causal premise that "everything that begins to exist" has a cause. This encompasses the more modest view that objects cannot come into existence entirely devoid of causal conditions, rooted in the Parmenidean principle that from nothing, nothing comes.

Where quantum events arise without sufficient prior conditions, he affirms at least some necessary conditions are present:

The appearance of a particle in a quantum vacuum may thus be said to be spontaneous, but cannot properly be said to be absolutely uncaused, since it has many physically necessary conditions. To be uncaused in the relevant sense of an absolute beginning, an existent must lack any non-logical necessary or sufficient conditions whatsoever.

Wes Morriston inquires whether necessary conditions alone are adequate in defining causation, suggesting further substantiation is necessary when contemplating the causal origin of the universe. For Bruce Reichenbach, the strength of the causal premise is grounded in the ontology of quantum indeterminacy. If indeterminism is an ontic feature of the real world rather than an epistemic artefact of incomplete knowledge or hidden variables, he suggests its implications for the Causal Principle would be "significantly negative":

The more this indeterminacy has ontological significance [as a feature of the real world], the weaker is the Causal Principle. This is particularly important for subatomic events, which would characterize the beginning of the universe. However, if the indeterminacy has merely epistemic significance, it scarcely affects the Causal Principle.

Craig contends that, though indeterminism is central to the Copenhagen interpretation of quantum mechanics, it is only one of many interpretations, most of which are fully deterministic and none of which are yet known to be true:

A great many physicists today are quite dissatisfied with the traditional Copenhagen Interpretation of quantum physics and are exploring deterministic theories like that of David Bohm. ... Quantum cosmologists are especially averse to Copenhagen, since that interpretation in a cosmological context will require an ultramundane [transcendental] observer to collapse the wave function of the universe. Thus quantum physics hardly furnishes a proven exception to [the first premise].

=== The quantum vacuum ===
Quantum vacuum phenomena, from virtual particles to quantum universes, are often expounded to be uncaused in origin. This may refer to:

1. Quantum indeterminacy governing the physics of the vacuum state.
2. Plenistic perspectives that define the vacuum state as "nothing" in a semantic sense.

Quentin Smith describes the spontaneous emergence and dissipation of virtual particles, representing fluctuations of energy in the quantum vacuum, as evidence of uncaused natural phenomena. Lawrence Krauss broadens the scope of this framework to postulate the origin of space, time and matter from a quantum fluctuation. The universe can be uncaused, he claims, by virtue of its emergence from "nothing", which he identifies as the vacuum state, and extensive astrophysical evidence for its zero-energy state. If the mass energy of the universe is negated by its gravitational energy, he calculates no net energy investment or causal input is required at its origin. Michael Martin writes:

Even if the universe has a beginning in time, in the light of recently proposed cosmological theories this beginning may be uncaused. Despite Craig's claim that theories postulating that the universe "could pop into existence uncaused" are incapable of "sincere affirmation," such similar theories are in fact being taken seriously by scientists.

David Albert deems the term "nothing" to be misleading in defining the quantum vacuum:

Relativistic-quantum-field-theoretical vacuum states—no less than giraffes or refrigerators or solar systems—are particular arrangements of elementary physical stuff. The true relativistic-quantum-field-theoretical equivalent to there not being any physical stuff at all isn't this or that particular arrangement of the fields—what it is (obviously, and ineluctably, and on the contrary) is the simple absence of the fields.

Citing quantum cosmologist Christopher Isham, Craig specifies that a zero-energy universe still requires initial "ontic seeding" to bring its positive and negative energy states into existence. He describes the vacuum state as a structured, energetic medium that qualifies as something rather than nothing, rejecting the view of quantum vacuum phenomena as uncaused:

... virtual particles do not literally come into existence spontaneously out of nothing. Rather the energy locked up in a vacuum fluctuates spontaneously in such a way as to convert into evanescent particles that return almost immediately to the vacuum.

Alexander Vilenkin contemplates the origin of the universe via quantum creation from a state of "zero size" (without space, time or matter) which he equates with nothingness. Yet, he maintains that the laws of physics are still present and require explanation:

That makes you wonder, where are these laws? If the laws describe the creation of the universe, that suggests they existed prior to the universe. The question that nobody has any idea how to address is where these laws come from and why these laws in particular?

== Premise two: cosmology and physics ==
Premise two: "The universe began to exist."

For scientific confirmation of the finitude of the past, Craig refers to evidence in cosmology and theoretical physics:

1. The standard model of cosmology, which characterises the origin of the universe in the Big Bang.
2. The second law of thermodynamics, which stipulates that the universe must, in a finite duration, reach a state of equilibrium known as heat death. If the universe has an infinite past, he argues, heat death would have already transpired.
3. The Borde–Guth–Vilenkin theorem, according to which any universe that has, on average, been expanding throughout its history cannot have been expanding indefinitely but must have had a past boundary at which inflation began.

=== Boundary cosmology ===
Alexander Vilenkin describes the Borde–Guth–Vilenkin theorem:

A remarkable thing about this theorem is its sweeping generality. We made no assumptions about the material content of the universe. We did not even assume that gravity is described by Einstein's equations. So, if Einstein's [General Theory of Relativity] requires some modification, our conclusion will still hold. The only assumption that we made was that the expansion rate of the universe never gets below some nonzero value, no matter how small.

According to Vilenkin and co-author Alan Guth, the past boundary described by the Borde–Guth–Vilenkin theorem does not necessarily represent a cosmic beginning, instead the beginning of cosmic inflation. Though it "opens the door" for scenarios other than an absolute beginning, Vilenkin derives from his examination of cosmogonic theories, including eternal inflation, cyclic and emergent cosmologies, that no past-eternal models of the universe are viable. In the conference setting, he declares that "all the available evidence points to a cosmic beginning". In publications, he maintains that the Borde–Guth–Vilenkin theorem is sufficient evidence for a beginning of the universe.

Sean Carroll observes that the theorem assumes a classical spacetime, determining it to be incompatible with the extreme energies and densities that define the Planck era of the early universe, where quantum effects become dominant. Instead of defining a cosmic beginning, he describes the theorem's boundary to demarcate the point at which classical mechanics of the universe no longer apply:

... the real world is governed by quantum mechanics, and the BGV theorem assumes a classical spacetime, so it says nothing definitive about what actually happens in the universe; it is only a guideline to when our classical description breaks down.

Craig responds that, if anything exists before the theorem's past boundary, it would be a non-classical region defined by a yet-to-be-determined theory of quantum gravity. This quantum gravity region must also have a beginning, he specifies, given that its inherent instability would render any quantum regime impossible to endure indefinitely or exist timelessly and changelessly:

If there is such a non-classical region, then it is not past eternal in the classical sense. But neither can it exist literally timelessly, akin to the way in which philosophers consider abstract objects to be timeless or theologians take God to be timeless. For this region is in a state of constant flux, which, given the Indiscernibility of Identicals, is sufficient for time. So even if time as defined in classical physics does not exist at such an era, some sort of time would.

He draws on arguments from Anthony Aguirre and John Kehayias, who write:

It is very difficult to devise a system, especially a quantum one, that does nothing 'forever', then evolves. A truly stationary or periodic quantum state, which would last forever, would never evolve, whereas one with any instability will not endure for an indefinite time.

=== Exception classes ===
As a purely kinematic theorem—relying solely on the geometric properties of expanding classical spacetime—the Borde–Guth–Vilenkin theorem assumes an average rate of cosmic expansion greater than zero (H_{avg} > 0) on the basis of a linear arrow of time.

Craig and James Sinclair identify 4 exception conditions that bypass this requirement and evade the theorem:

1. Past eternal static state followed by cosmic expansion (H_{avg} = 0) e.g. emergent models.
2. Perpetual cycle of cosmic expansion then contraction (H_{avg} = 0) e.g. cyclic models.
3. Infinite cosmic contraction prior to the current expansion (H_{avg} < 0) e.g. de Sitter cosmology.
4. Reversal of time at the cosmological boundary, e.g. Aguirre–Gratton model.

They contend that these models contradict observational cosmology or confirm the cosmic beginning they were devised to disprove.

==== Emergent cosmology ====
According to the emergent universe model, the universe existed in a static phase for an infinite duration, then transitioned spontaneously via quantum tunneling to a dynamic expansion phase. The static phase is metastable and, because it endures over infinite time, the universe overall has an average expansion rate of zero (H_{avg} = 0) thereby avoiding the Borde–Guth–Vilenkin theorem.

Metastability in this context refers to a false vacuum state, which is stable according to classical physics, but unstable at the quantum mechanical level in that it can transition spontaneously via quantum tunneling to a more stable true vacuum state. This transition may trigger cosmic inflation, or conversely, collapse of the universe to a hyperdense state. Vilenkin and Audrey Mithani maintain that the metastable state cannot endure indefinitely. Though an event such as cosmic collapse is highly improbable, they argue that over an infinite duration it becomes a mathematical certainty. If the static emergent universe cannot exist indefinitely, then it must have had a beginning.

Responding to Vilenkin and Mithani, Rube Goldberg cosmology proposes a variant framework that is fully classical, avoiding the contradictions associated with quantum instability. The author notes, however, that this composition imposes a "long chain of highly ad hoc assumptions, akin to a Rube Goldberg machine".

==== Bounce cosmologies ====
Bounce cosmology refers to any theoretical framework in which the universe rebounds from a preceding phase of contraction to the current phase of expansion, substituting the initial singularity predicted by classical general relativity with a big bounce.

Cyclic universes proceed through an infinite cycle of expansions and contractions. Though the earliest models proposed no net expansion or contraction (H_{avg} = 0), they were noted to be in violation of the second law of thermodynamics given that the universe would eventually reach a state of heat death, rendering an infinite cycle impossible. Paul Steinhardt and Neil Turok suggest that cosmic volume could increase with each cycle, causing entropy dilution sufficient to avert heat death. Vilenkin notes, however, that this would put the universe in a state of net expansion, rendering it subject to the Borde–Guth–Vilenkin theorem, therefore finite into the past.

De Sitter cosmology describes a universe that contracts for infinite time prior to a point of minimum size, followed by expansion. Though it avoids the Borde–Guth–Vilenkin theorem by averaging net contraction through time (H_{avg} < 0), George Ellis maintains that initial conditions must be inexplicably precise for contraction to rebound into uniform expansion characteristic of the observed universe. This extraordinary fine-tuning must be acausal and assumed as brute fact, he argues, given that it originates in an infinite past. Vilenkin writes:

You can evade the theorem by postulating that the universe was contracting prior to some time. ... This sounds as if there is nothing wrong with having contraction prior to expansion. But the problem is that a contracting universe is highly unstable. Small perturbations would cause it to develop all sorts of messy singularities, so it would never make it to the expanding phase.

==== Time reversal at the boundary ====
The Aguirre–Gratton model postulates a reversal of time at $t=0$, with spacetime structured as two cosmic expansions evolving in opposite time directions from a point of minimum size. The universe resembles a de Sitter 'bounce', but classifies as a model of eternal inflation by maintaining an inflationary state at every point in time. Among the model's proponents are Victor J. Stenger, as well as Sean Carroll, who presents it as "proof by construction" that a universe without a beginning is conceivable. Vilenkin pronounces a reversal of time at $t=0$ to make the moment "no less special than a true beginning of the universe." He elaborates to Stenger:

Models of this sort have been discussed by Aguirre & Gratton, and by Carroll & Chen. They had to assume though that the minimum of entropy was reached at the bounce and offered no mechanism to enforce this condition. It seems to me that it is essentially equivalent to a beginning.

== Premise two: philosophical arguments ==
For philosophical evidence of the finitude of the past, Craig refers to:

1. Hilbert's paradox of the Grand Hotel, to illustrate the metaphysical impossibility of actual infinites existing in reality.
2. The Tristram Shandy Paradox, to demonstrate the impossibility of forming an actual infinite by successive addition.

Correspondingly, he argues:

- An infinite series of past events is metaphysically impossible, given that it would represent an actual infinite existing in reality.
- Past events cannot be extended to an infinite past, given that they consist of a series formed by successive addition.

Variations of these arguments have been presented by philosopher Andrew Loke, who refers to a modified version of Hilbert's Hotel, and Ben Waters, who has published the story of Methuselah's Diary as a refinement of the diary of Tristram Shandy.

Craig maintains that, though it is metaphysically impossible for actual infinities to exist in the real world, they (and the absurdities that attend their existence in the real world) are describable via mathematics, therefore logically possible. He also distinguishes between actual infinities and potential infinities, stating that it is fully possible for potential infinites to exist in the real world, in contrast to the former:

A potential infinite is a series which has a beginning and is growing indefinitely; infinity serves merely as an ideal limit of the series which it never reaches ... That’s impossible, since for any natural number n, n+1 is always a finite number.

=== Actuality of the past ===
Edward Feser observes that the Kalam cosmological argument is grounded in a presentist theory of time, which construes that past and future do not exist (they have existed or are yet to exist but do not exist now) and only the present moment is actual. He pronounces this view of time to be incompatible with objections against an eternal past based on Hilbert's Hotel:

If the present alone is real, then how can an infinite series of events in time count as an actual infinite? Past moments of time are not actual; they no longer exist ... In the Hilbert's hotel scenario [the rooms and guests] exist together all at once, at the same time.

Craig affirms that the simultaneous existence of the enumerated objects is irrelevant, so long as past events have been real, thus instantiated in reality, they can be counted. He refers to a narrative by Aquinas of a blacksmith who, from an eternal past, has used and broken successive hammers. He writes that the discarded hammers need no longer exist to be counted as an actual infinite. Furthermore, that the absurdities attending the existence of actual infinites in reality still apply if the enumerated objects no longer exist:

... in an infinite series of past events, the number of odd-numbered events is the same as the number of all the events, even though the latter collection includes all the odd-numbered events plus an infinite number of even-numbered events as well.

Feser contends that past events are more analogous to abstract objects than concrete objects, such as rooms and guests relevant to Hilbert's Hotel, noting that it is fully tenable for mathematicians to deal with infinite sets of abstract objects, such as natural numbers. For this, he refers to Aristotle's postulate that denies the existence of time independent of objects that change:

To speak of time apart from change is a bit like speaking of a universal like redness apart from actual red things—it is to engage in abstraction from the concrete conditions under which the thing in question (redness, or time) can actually exist.

=== The Symmetry Objection ===
Craig proposes that, though a beginningless past would qualify as an actually infinite series of past events, an endless future would qualify only as a potential infinite, given that future events, unlike past events, are yet to be actualised and merely potential.

Wes Morriston and Alex Malpass argue that this asymmetry is arbitrary. They stipulate that future events that will be actual satisfy the same reality condition as past events that are deemed actual in that they have been. Furthermore, that natural numbers can serve as common sense representation for moments in time. Since the set of natural numbers greater than any given value, x, is always an actual infinite, they derive that future events beyond any point in time must also be actually infinite. If the Hilbert's Hotel paradox disproves an eternal past, they conclude that it must—by correspondence—negate an endless future, contradicting the Judeo-Christian doctrine of eternal life. Morriston continues:

[We agree with most defenders of the Kalam argument] that an endless series of events, each of which will occur, is at least metaphysically possible. But then an actual infinity of events occurring one-after-another is plainly possible, in which case the possibility of a beginningless series of past events should not be rejected merely on the ground that it would be an actual infinite.

Craig responds that, as an objection to the Hilbert's Hotel argument, their critique begs the question by postulating the possible existence of an actual infinite to dispute an argument which illustrates that actual infinites cannot exist. He adds that it fails to address the ontological distinction between past and future qualified by the objectivity of temporal becoming under presentism:

The series of events later than any event in time, including the initial cosmological singularity, is always finite and always increasing toward infinity as a limit. In other words, such a series is potentially infinite. ... By contrast the series of events earlier than any event in time cannot be potentially infinite, for in order to be so, it would have to be finite and yet increasing in the earlier than direction, which contradicts the nature of temporal becoming. So a beginningless series of such events must be actually infinite.

== Conclusion: "The universe has a cause." ==
In a critique of Craig's book The Kalām Cosmological Argument, published in 1979, Michael Martin writes:

It should be obvious that Craig's conclusion that a single personal agent created the universe is a non sequitur. At most, this Kalam argument shows that some personal agent or agents created the universe. Craig cannot validly conclude that a single agent is the creator. On the contrary, for all he shows, there may have been trillions of personal agents involved in the creation.

Martin adds that Craig has not justified his claim of creation ex nihilo, remarking that the universe may have been created from pre-existing material in a timeless or eternal state. Moreover, that Craig takes his argument too far beyond what his premises allow in stating that the creator is greater than the universe. For this, he cites the example of a parent creating a child who eventually becomes greater than he or she.

=== Conceptual analysis of the First Cause ===
In the Blackwell Companion to Natural Theology, published in 2009, Craig and James Sinclair present a philosophical analysis of the properties of the cause of the universe, indicating that they follow by entailment from the initial syllogism of the Kalam cosmological argument:

1. The universe must originate ex nihilo in being without natural cause, because no natural explanation can be causally prior to the very existence of the natural world. The cause of the universe is therefore outside of space and time (timeless, therefore changeless, and spaceless) as well as immaterial and enormously powerful, in bringing spacetime and its contents into existence.
2. Even if positing a plurality of causes prior to the origin of the universe, the causal chain must terminate in a cause which is absolutely first and uncaused, otherwise an infinite regress of causes would arise, which Craig and Sinclair argue is impossible.
3. Occam's Razor maintains that unicity of the First Cause should be assumed in the absence of specific reasons to believe that there is more than one causeless cause.
4. Agent causation, or volitional action, is the only ontological condition in which an effect can arise in the absence of prior determining conditions. Therefore, only personal, free agency can account for the origin of a first temporal effect from a changeless cause.
5. There are two conceivable categories of objects with the potential to be uncaused, spaceless, timeless and immaterial:
  - Minds (in some conceptions of mind-body dualism) may be characterised as immaterial and spatially unextended, with the potential to be unembodied, timeless, changeless and beginningless.
  - Abstract objects, such as the set of natural numbers, may be described as non-spatial and non-temporal, but do not sit in causal relationships and are therefore causally ineffective.

Based upon their conceptual analysis, Craig concludes:

... an uncaused, personal Creator of the universe exists, who sans the universe is beginningless, changeless, immaterial, timeless, spaceless and enormously powerful.

He remarks upon the theological significance of this union of properties:

... our whole universe was caused to exist by something beyond it and greater than it. For it is no secret that one of the most important conceptions of what theists mean by 'God' is Creator of heaven and earth.

== Theories of time ==
=== Temporal becoming ===
The Kalam cosmological argument is grounded in the A-theory of time, also known as the tensed theory of time or presentism, according to which only the present moment exists, the past is no longer actual and the future is yet to be actualised. This is opposed to the B-theory of time, also known as the tenseless theory of time or eternalism, in which past, present and future co-exist simultaneously and there is no privilege to the present other than as an indexical frame of reference (analogous to a coordinate labelled 'here' in spatial geometry).

Under the A-theory, the passage of time and temporal becoming (objects "coming into being" and "going out of being") are objective and real features of the universe. Time is dynamic, with a single metaphysically privileged present evolving constantly through a succession of contiguous events. In the B-theory, temporal passage and temporal becoming are illusions of consciousness within a static timeline. Craig writes:

On a B-Theory of time, the universe does not in fact come into being or become actual at the Big Bang; it just exists tenselessly as a four-dimensional space-time block that is finitely extended in the earlier than direction. If time is tenseless, then the universe never really comes into being, and, therefore, the quest for a cause of its coming into being is misconceived.

He proposes a tensed definition of beginning to exist, incorporating the A-theory conception of coming into being:

A. Entity x begins to exist at time t if and only if x comes into being at t.

B. x comes into being at t if and only if:

1. x exists at t, and the actual world includes no state of affairs in which x exists timelessly.
  [—Excluding timeless entities (God and abstract objects) from the set of things that begin to exist.]
2. t is either the first time at which x exists or is separated from any prior time t' < t at which x existed by an interval during which x does not exist.
  [—Accommodating a cosmos that begins to exist without any prior time.]
3. x's existing at t is a tensed fact.
  [—Specifying the A-theory of time, fulfilling the requirement for objective temporal becoming.]

=== Neo-Lorentzian relativity ===
Craig has defended the A-theory against objections from J. M. E. McTaggart and hybrid A–B theorists. He refers to the neo‐Lorentzian interpretation of the Special Theory of Relativity, which he contends has become tenable in light of recent findings in quantum mechanics concerning Bell's theorem. Similar to Einstein's original interpretation, the Lorentzian view describes a 3-dimensional universe existing through time, with objects in motion demonstrating time dilation and length contraction. However, these relativistic distortions occur relative to a privileged rest frame (an absolute frame of reference for the universe) rather than relative to each observer.

The neo-Lorentzian privileged frame, or preferred frame, is characterised as an all-encompassing substrate, or ether, which preserves a single, metaphysically privileged space (absolute space) and timeline (absolute time and absolute simultaneity) for the universe and its contents. Craig writes that this foundational framework of absolute space and absolute time resolves the fragmentation of reality that characterises Einsteinian relativity, in which observers in relative motion occupy different spaces and times. Importantly, Lorentz's view of time as dynamic, and distinct from space, renders it compatible with the A-theory conception of a tensed universe.

Philosopher Yuri Balashov asserts that both consensus and evidence support Minkowski's interpretation of relativity, which posits a 4D geometric universe inhabited by objects extended in time as well as space. In spurning the notion of a 3D universe existing in time, Minkowskian relativity rejects the A-theory, correlating instead with the B-theory conception of a tenseless spacetime. Balashov remarks:

Despite the fact that presentism has the firm backing of common sense and eternalism revolts against it, eternalism is widely regarded as almost the default view in contemporary debates, and presentism as a highly problematic view.

Craig suggests that Balashov underestimates the challenge to Minkowskian relativity presented by recent findings. He criticises Balashov for adopting a verificationist method that overlooks important metaphysical and theological foundations for the A-theory, declaring that correct interpretation of Special Relativity involves not merely scientific, but also metaphysical, inquiry.

=== Compatibility with the B-theory ===
In a 2020 interview, Craig proposed that the Kalam cosmological argument could be adapted to the B-theory of time by:

- Abandoning the metaphysical argument against forming an actual infinity by successive addition.
- Modifying the causal premise (replacing its appeal to the concept of 'coming into being' with the concept of 'beginning to exist').

Under the B-theory, scientific evidence for the finitude of the past would still be valid and the argument as a whole would be tenable, though requiring reformulation to correct for the negation of temporal becoming. Craig articulates a B-theory version of its syllogism:

1. If something exists at a time t but it does not exist at any earlier point in time then it has a cause.
2. The universe does exist at time t at which there is no earlier time where the universe existed.
3. Therefore, the universe has a cause.

Philosopher Ben Waters has also argued that the Kalam cosmological argument does not require a commitment to the A-theory.

== See also ==
- Arguments for the existence of God
- Cosmogony
- Natural theology
- Principle of sufficient reason
- Temporal finitism
- Agent causation
- Kalam
- Risalat Istihsan al-Khawd fi 'Ilm al-Kalam
