= Reasonable Faith (book) =

1994 book by William Lane Craig

Reasonable Faith: Christian Truth and Apologetics
- Cover of the first edition
- Author: William Lane Craig
- Language: English
- Subject: Apologetics
- Publisher: Crossway Books
- Publication date: 1994
- Publication place: United States
- Media type: Print (Paperback)
- Pages: 415
- ISBN: 978-1433501159

Reasonable Faith: Christian Truth and Apologetics is a 1994 book by the philosopher William Lane Craig. It began as a set of lectures for Craig's own class on apologetics.

In 2008, Craig released the third edition of Reasonable Faith, which featured mild revisions to the previous version.

== Contents ==
The book is structured around Philip Melanchthon’s loci communes of systematic theology. Some of the most frequently discussed today include de Scriptura sacra (doctrine of Scripture), de creatione (doctrine of creation), de peccato (doctrine of sin), de Christo (Christology), de gratia (soteriology), de ecclesia (ecclesiology), and de novissimis (eschatology). For every topic, Craig first outlines the historical background of the issue in question to see how past thinkers have dealt with it. Second, he presents and defends his personal views on the topic, seeking to develop a Christian apologetic on the point. Third, he shares some thoughts and personal experiences on applying this material in evangelism. Finally, he provides bibliographical information on the literature cited or recommended for future reading.
