= List of Kalevala translations =

A list of translations of the Finnish national epic Kalevala in chronological order by language. The list of translations is being maintained and updated by the Kalevala Society Foundation at the website Kalevala Around the World.

This list is based partially on the lists compiled by Rauni Puranen and Henni Ilomäki.

Language	Year	Translator	Remark
German	1840	Nikolai Mühlberg	The first 60 lines of the first song translated into German and Estonian, published in 1840 in Verhandlungen der gelehrten Estnischen Gesellschaft zu Dorpat, vol. 1, no. 1. Estonian, pp. 89–94; German, pp. 94–96.
German	1848	Jacob Grimm	A short 38-line reading at a presentation in the Berlin Academy of Sciences.
German	1852	Franz Anton Schiefner	A very important verse translation used by many other translators to bring the Kalevala to their own language and revised by Martin Buber in 1921.
German	1885–1886	Hermann Paul	Verse translation.
German	1936	Arthur Luther	A word-by-word translation that is made based on the revision by Martin Buber of Schiefner's translation.
German	1967	Lore Fromm and Hans Fromm	Full translation directly from Finnish.
German	1978	Inge Ott	Prose adaptation based on the translation by Fromm.
German	2004	Gisbert Jänicke	Full translation.
Estonian	1840	Nikolai Mühlberg	The first 60 lines of the first song translated into German and Estonian, published in 1840 in Verhandlungen der gelehrten Estnischen Gesellschaft zu Dorpat, vol. 1, no. 1. Estonian, pp. 89–94; German, pp. 94–96.
Estonian	1891–1898	Matthias Johann Eisen	
Estonian	1938	August Annist	
Swedish	1841	M. A. Castrén	Full translation of the 1835 Old Kalevala.
Swedish	1864–1868	Karl Collan	Full translation of the 1849 Kalevala.
Swedish	1884	Rafaël Hertzberg	
Swedish	1944	Olaf Homén	An abridged edition
Swedish	1948	Björn Collinder	trims about 10% of the text
Swedish	1999	Lars Huldén and Mats Huldén	
Hungarian	1841	Antal Reguly	Old Kalevala songs 1-3 and 29.
Hungarian	1871	Ferdinánd Barna	Full translation via Franz Anton Schiefner's translation.
Hungarian	1909	Béla Vikár	
Hungarian	1971	Kálmán Nagy	
Hungarian	1976	István Rácz	
Hungarian	1987	Imre Szente	
French	1845 and 1867	Louis Léouzon le Duc	An important translation used by many other translators to bring Kalevala to their own language.
French	1926	Charles Guyot	Abridged version of Louis Léouzon le Duc's translation.
French	1927	Jean-Louis Perret	Full translation in metric verse.
French	1991	Gabriel Rebourcet	Full translation. In old-style French vocabulary.
English	1868	John Addison Porter	Partial translation (The story of Aino) via Franz Anton Schiefner's translation.
English	1869	Edward Taylor Fletcher	Partial translation directly from Finnish (with a lengthy essay).
English	1882	Selma Borg	Partial translation (Song I) directly from Finnish.
English	1888	John Martin Crawford	Full translation, via Franz Anton Schiefner's translation.
English	1893	R. Eivind	A complete prose adaptation for children via Crawford's translation.
English	1907	William Forsell Kirby	Second full translation. Directly from Finnish. Imitates the Kalevala meter.
English	1940	Babette Deutsch	a prose retelling of the epic saga for young readers.
English	1950	Aili Kolehmainen Johnson	Abridged prose translation.
English	1954	Margaret Sperry	Adapted verse translation of song 50.
English	1963	Francis Peabody Magoun Jr.	Scholarly prose translation. Included with detailed essays and background information.
English	1969	Francis Peabody Magoun Jr.	Scholarly prose translation of the 1835 Old Kalevala.
English	1977	Ursula Synge	Abridged prose version. Using W. F. Kirby's translation as a reference.
English	1989	Eino Friberg	Editing and introduction by George C. Schoolfield. Imitates the Kalevala meter selectively. The songs in this version are also not of the same length or structure as in the original. Released to coincide with the 150th anniversary of the original publication.
English	1989	Keith Bosley	Uses a syllabic verse form to allow for accuracy and metrical variety; released to coincide with the 150th anniversary of the original publication, subsequently published as an audiobook read by the translator himself in 2013.
English	2020	Kaarina Brooks	Complete translation of runic version of 1835 Old Kalevala, following the Kalevala meter throughout.
English	2021	Kaarina Brooks	Complete translation of the runic version of the Kalevala, following the Kalevala meter throughout.
Russian	1888	Leonid Petrovic Belsky	An important translation used by many other Slavic translators to bring Kalevala to their own language.
Russian	1953	Aleksandra Lyubarskaya	Retelling for children with poem fragments from Belsky
Russian	1998 & 2006	Eino Kiuru and Armas Hiiri	
Czech	1894–1895	Josef Holeček	Full translation in metric verse.
Czech	1941	Josef Honzl	Prose translation
Czech	1946	Bohuslav Čepelák	Prose translation
Czech	1962	Vladislav Stanovský	Prose translation
Ukrainian	1901	Yevhen Tymchenko	Originally published in Lviv, reissued in Kyiv in 1928 and 1995.
Danish	1902	Ferdinand Ohrt	Partial translation.
Danish	1994	Hilkka Søndergaard and Bent Søndergaard	Full translation of songs 1–22 and 24–50, but excluding song 23, in trochaic tetrameter.
Danish	2017	Hilkka Søndergaard, Bent Søndergaard, and Erik Skyum Nielsen	Re-issue of the 1994 translation commemorating the centenary of Finland's independence, with song 23 translated (from the Swedish 1999 translation) by Erik Skyum Nielsen.
Italian	1909	Igino Cocchi	Verse translation (hendecasyllable)
Italian	1910	Paolo Emilio Pavolini	Verse translation (original metre)
Italian	1912	Francesco di Silvestri-Falconieri	Prose translation
Italian	1980	Liliana Calimeri	Used Ursula Synge's version as a model.
Italian	1988	Gabriella Agrati and Maria Letizia Magini	Prose translation
Italian	2010	Marcello Ganassini	Verse translation (blank verses)
Turkish	1918	Ömer Seyfettin	Partial translation.
Turkish	1965	Hilmi Ziya Ülken	Translation of the first 2 songs. Using the Hungarian and French as a basis. Published in the Yearbook of the Kalevala Society, volume 43 (1963)
Turkish	1982	Lale and Muammar Oğuz	Full interpreted prose translation. Missing 25% of the original content for artistic purposes.
Turkish	2017	Riitta Cankoçak	
Lithuanian	1922	Adolfas Sabaliauskas	
Lithuanian	1972	Justinas Marcinkevičius	
Latvian	1924	Linards Laicens	Uses trochaic tetrameter and syllable stress rhythm. Reissued in 1959 with illustrations by Akseli Gallen-Kallela and in 1964 with illustrations by Ģirts Vilks.
Dutch	1928	Maya Tamminen	Partial verse translation with connecting prose summaries. The only Dutch translation is directly from Finnish.
Dutch	1938	Wies Moens	Abridged prose translation. based on the German adaptation by Arthur Luther.
Dutch	1940	Jan H. Eekhout	A shortened adaptation in verse. Based on the German translation by Schiefner and Buber, and the Dutch version of Tamminen.
Dutch	1969	Henrik Hartwijk	Translation of song #5. Published in the Yearbook of the Kalevala Society.
Dutch	1979	J. C. Ebbinge Wubben	Full prose translation. Based on the German adaptation of Inge Ott.
Dutch	1985	Mies le Nobel	Full verse translation. Based on the German translation by Schiefner and Buber.
Serbian	1935	Ivan S. Šajković	
Japanese	1937	Kakutan Morimoto	
Japanese	1961	Tsutomu Kuwaki	
Japanese	1976	Tamotsu Koizumi	
Spanish	1944	Alejandro Casona	Abridged prose translation, based on Charles Guyot's version.
Spanish	1953	María Dolores Arroyo	Full metric verse translation via Perret's French and Pavolini's Italian translations
Spanish	1967	Juan B. Bergua	Full prose translation, via French and English translations
Spanish	1985	Ursula Ojanen and Joaquín Fernández	Full translation directly from Finnish.
Spanish	1995	Carmen Crouzeilles	Abridged prose translation. Published in Buenos Aires.
Romanian	1946	Barbu B. Brezianu	Full prose translation.
Romanian	1959	Iulian Vesper	Full translation using an eight-syllable verse form.
Romanian	1985	Pavel Starostin	Published in Moldovan which is identical to Romanian. Abridged translation.
Hebrew	1954	Shaul Tchernichovsky	
Hebrew	1964	Sarah Tovia	Reissued 1978 in collaboration with The Finnish/Israeli Friendship Society
Yiddish	1954	Hersh Rosenfeld	
Belarusian	1956	Mikhasʹ Mashara	Prose and poetry excerpts.
Belarusian	2015	Jakub Lopatka	Full translation directly from Finnish.
Belarusian	2024	Olga Ravchenko	Prose translation for children
Icelandic	1957 & 1962	Karl Ísfeld	This translation utilizes the Icelandic "three-par" alliteration method.
Chinese	1962	Han Shiheng	Translated via the Russian translation.
Chinese	1981	Sun Yong	Translated via W. F. Kirby's English translation.
Chinese	2000	Zhang Hua Wen	
Esperanto	1964	Johannes Edvard Leppäkoski	Full translation in Kalevala meter, published as trochaic octometers (one for every two Finnish verses) with mandatory central caesura
Arabic	1965	Muhamed Said al-Juneid	Abridged translation (Poem 50) published in the yearbook of the Kalevala Society.
Arabic	1991	Sahban Ahmad Mroueh	
Norwegian	1967	Albert Lange Fliflet	Nynorsk language translation. Based on an earlier unpublished translation.
Norwegian	2017	Mikael Holmberg	Bokmål language retelling in trochaic tetrameter.
Georgian	1969	Mukhran Machavariani, Shota Chantladze and Givi Dzneladze	
Armenian	1972	Hmayak Siras	Abridged prose translation.
Polish	1974	Józef Ozga-Michalski	Full translation based on the work of Karol Laszecki.
Polish	1998	Jerzy Litwiniuk	Full translation
Komi	1980 & 1984	Adolf Turkin	Partial translation (Väinämöinen's playing and Song 10.)
Fulani	1983	Alpha A. Diallo	Book was published in Hungary, illustrated with Akseli Gallen-Kallela's artwork.
Tulu	1985	Amrith Someshwar	Used Keith Bosley's Wanton Loverboy: Kalevala Cantos 11–15 to aid in the translation of some parts.
Latin	1986	Tuomo Pekkanen	
Vietnamese	1986	Nguyễn Xuân Nghiệp	Full prose translation.
Vietnamese	1991	Hoàng Thái Anh	Full prose translation.
Vietnamese	1994	Bùi Việt Hoa	Full translation in metrical verse.
Slovak	1986	Marek E. Světlík and Jan Petr Velkoborský	
Hindi	1990 & 1997	Vishnu Khare	
Slovene	1991	Jelka Ovaska Novak	Partial translation.
Slovene	1997	Jelka Ovaska Novak	Full translation.
Swahili	1992	Jan Knappert	Illustrated with Tanzanian Robino Ntila's graphics.
Bulgarian	1992	Nino Nikolov	
Greek	1992	María Martzoúkou	Verse translation of the first 20 poems with prose translation of the rest.
Faroese	1993	Jóhannes av Skarði	
Tamil	1994	Ramalingam Sivalingam	Full translation. Introduction by Asko Parpola.
Catalan	1994	Encarna Sant-Celoni i Verger	Abridged prose translation.
Catalan	1997	Ramon Garriga i Marquès and Pirkko-Merja Lounavaara	Full translation in metric verse, directly from Finnish.
Persian	1998	Mahmoud Amir Yar Ahmadi and Mercedeh Khadivar Mohseni	Full translation directly from Finnish.
Persian	2012	Kiamars Baghbani	Retold and translated in Persian directly from Finnish.
Macedonian	1998	Vesna Acevska	
Uzbek	1988	Tŭra Mirzayev	Based on Lyubarskaya's Russian version.
Kannada	2001	K. R. Sandhya Reddy	Full translation from English.
Croatian	2001	Stjepan A. Szabó	Partial translation in narrative form.
Croatian	2006	Slavko Peleh	Full translation using the German translation partially.
Low German	2001	Herbert Strehmel	
Oriya	2001	Mahendra Kumar Mishra	Prose translation.
Udmurt	2001	Anatoli Uvarov	Summary.
Veps	2003	Nina Zaiceva	Verse summary.
Veps	2022	Nina Zaiceva	Full translation.
Portuguese	2007	Orlando Moreira	Full translation from an English version.
Portuguese	2009	José Bizerril and Álvaro Faleiros	Partial translation. Only the first song.
Portuguese	2013	Ana Soares and Merja de Mattos-Parreira	Full translation from Finnish; in verse; with critical introduction, and hundreds of footnotes.
Meänkieli	2007	Bengt Pohjanen	Translation of a select four songs.
Urdu	2012	Arshad Farooq	
Livvi-Karelian	2015	Raisa Remšujeva	
Karelian Proper	2015	Zinaida Dubinina	
Galician	2018	Tomás González Ahola and Tuula Ahola	
Nenets	2018	Vasili Ledkov	Translated from Russian
