= Agent causation =

Idea in philosophy

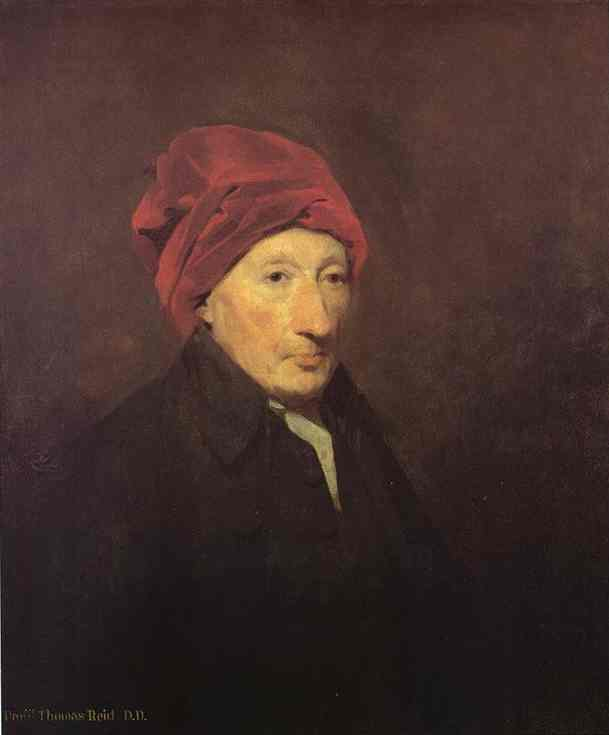
Thomas Reid, developer of the Agent-Causal theory of freedom.

Agent causation (or agent causality) is a category of determination in metaphysics, where a being who is not an event—namely an agent—can cause events (particularly the agent's own actions). Agent causation contrasts with event causation, which occurs when an event causes another event. Whether agent causation as a concept is logically sound is itself a topic of philosophical debate.

Defenders of this theory include Thomas Reid and Roderick Chisholm. Reid believed that agents are the only beings who have a will, and considered having a will to be a necessary condition of being considered the cause of an event.

== Proponents ==
Thomas Reid is credited as the founder of the theory of agent causation. In Essays on the Active Powers of Man (1788), Reid described an agent as one who has "power over the determinations of his own will." He held that agents are the only beings who have a will, and considered having a will to be a necessary condition of being considered the cause of an event.

Agent causation has been adopted by both compatibilists and incompatibilists alike. Defending a compatibilist interpretation, Ned Markosian proposed a situation in which a person's actions, caused by nothing other than their own agency, have shaped their moral character over their lifetime to compel them to always do the right thing. Roderick Chisholm's incompatibilist view contends that a free action is an action that originates from within the agent alone, not as the result of a prior event. While still subject to debate, agent causation is generally considered to align with incompatibilist theory.

Libertarians have offered agent causation as a defense of their incompatibilist belief that only undetermined, uncaused actions are free. One objection to this belief argues that an undetermined action is one that occurs at random, and freedom does not follow from random, "by chance" action. Agent causation counter-proposes the idea that an action need not be classified as either determined or random, but rather can occur under an agent's control.

== See also ==
- Causa sui
- Libertarianism (metaphysics)
- Volition
- Kalam cosmological argument
