= William Lane Craig =

American philosopher and theologian (born 1949)

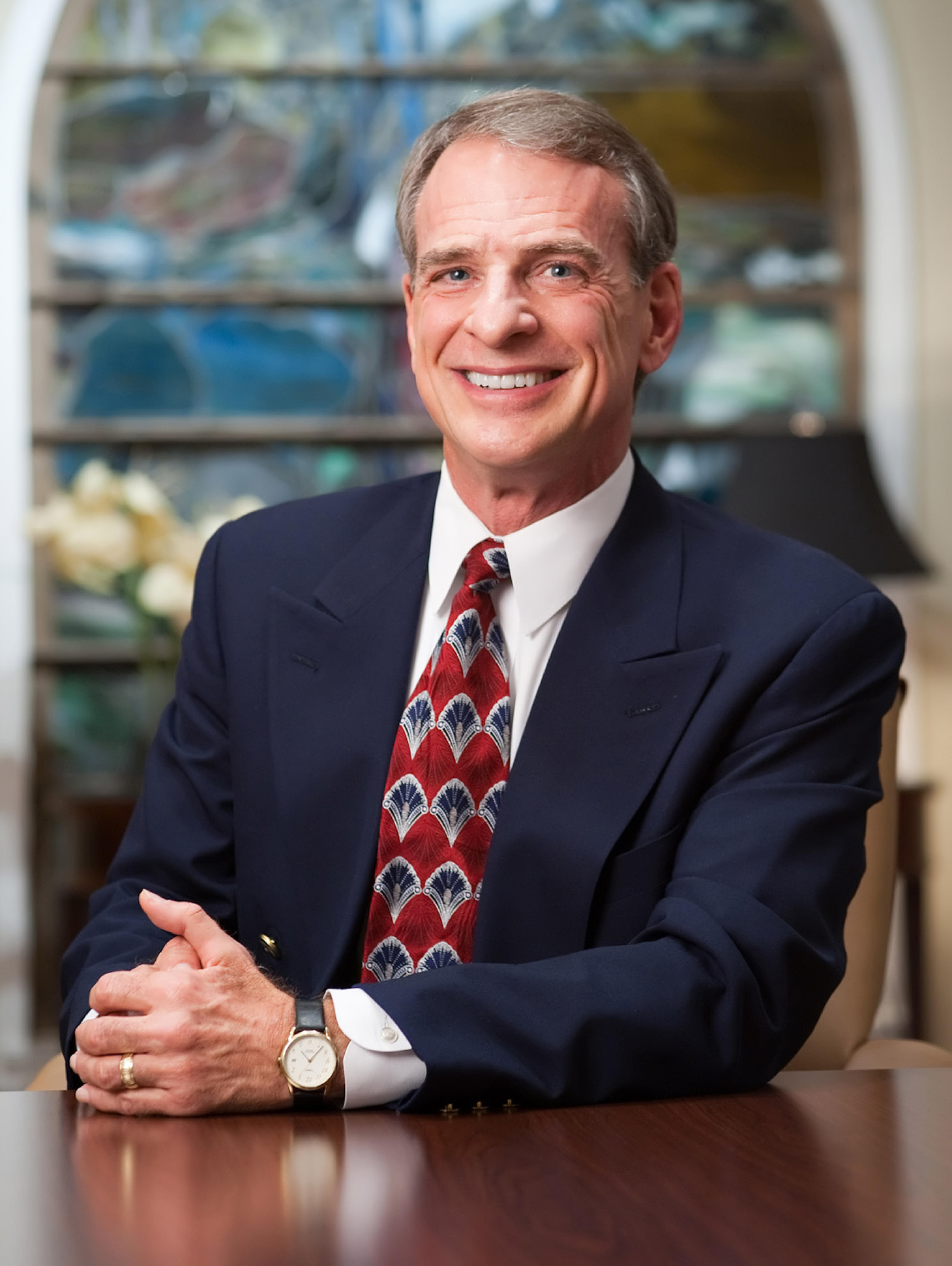
- Craig in 2014
- Born: August 23, 1949 (age 77); Peoria, Illinois, U.S.
- Spouse: Jan Coleman (m. 1972)

Education
- Education: Wheaton College (BA); Trinity Evangelical Divinity School (MA, MA); University of Birmingham (PhD); University of Munich (ThD)
- Theses: The Cosmological Argument for the Existence of God: Historical and Critical Analyses (1977); The Historical Argument for the Resurrection of Jesus During the Deist Controversy (1984)
- Doctoral advisor: John Hick (Birmingham) Wolfhart Pannenberg (Munich)
- Other advisors: Norman Geisler; Anthony Kenny

Philosophical work
- School: Analytic philosophy
- Institutions: See list: Trinity Evangelical Divinity School (1980–1986); Westmont College (1986–1987); University of Louvain (1987–1994); Biola University (1996–2020, 2021–present); Houston Christian University (2014–2024)
- Main interests: Apollinarism; Reformed epistemology; Cartesian dualism; metaphysical libertarianism
- Notable works: The Kalām Cosmological Argument (1979); Reasonable Faith (1994)
- Notable ideas: Kalam cosmological argument
- Website: www.reasonablefaith.org

William Lane Craig (/kreɪɡ/; born August 23, 1949) is an American analytic philosopher, Christian apologist, and Wesleyan theologian. He is a professor emeritus of philosophy at the Talbot School of Theology of Biola University.

Craig earned a doctorate in philosophy from the University of Birmingham under John Hick in 1977 and a second doctorate in theology from the University of Munich under Wolfhart Pannenberg in 1984. He was a professor of religion at Trinity Evangelical Divinity School from 1980 to 1986, a professor of religious studies at Westmont College from 1986 to 1987, and a researcher at KU Leuven from 1987 to 1994. He then became a professor at the Talbot School of Theology, after which he also taught as a professor of philosophy at Houston Christian University from 2014 to 2024.

Craig has written or edited more than forty books on the philosophy of religion, natural theology, the philosophy of time, and philosophical theology. He served as president of the Evangelical Philosophical Society from 1996 to 2005. He is best known for popularizing the Kalam cosmological argument for the existence of God, which he developed in The Kalām Cosmological Argument (1979) and defended in later works.

== Early life and education ==
Craig was born on August 23, 1949, in Peoria, Illinois. He was the second of three children. His father, Mallory John Craig, was a railway executive, and his mother, Doris Irene Walker, was a homemaker; neither were Christian. The elder Craig served in the Eighth Air Force during World War II, receiving a Bronze Star for his service, and worked as a clerk before becoming vice president of the Toledo, Peoria and Western Railway and chairman of the city planning commission of East Peoria, Illinois.

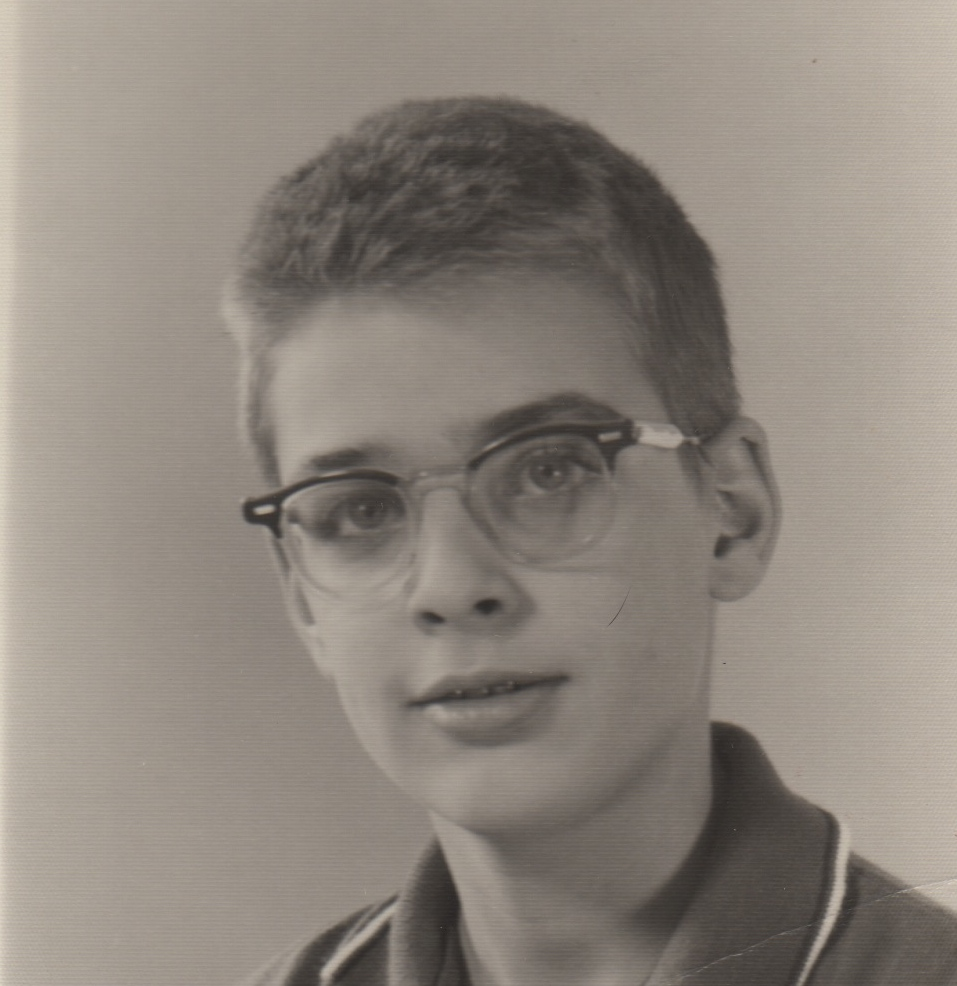
Craig as a middle school student, 1962

As a child, Craig suffered from the neurological disorder Charcot–Marie–Tooth disease, resulting in atrophy and muscle weakness. He was raised in Keokuk, Iowa. He attended East Peoria Community High School from 1963 to 1967. As a high school student, he competed in debate tournaments, winning a state championship in oratory in 1966. He also read the New Testament for the first time as a high school student and converted to Christianity on September 11, 1965.

After high school, Craig attended Wheaton College in Wheaton, Illinois, where he graduated with a Bachelor of Arts in communications with high honors in 1971. As a freshman undergraduate, he enrolled in a course taught by the philosopher Stuart C. Hackett, a noted proponent of natural theology, and was greatly influenced by the work of E. J. Carnell, which convinced him to study apologetics. He became the president of Wheaton's chapter of the Pi Kappa Delta honor society and received multiple awards for intercollegiate oratory, extemporaneous speaking, and rhetorical criticism.

In the summer of 1973, Craig enrolled at Trinity Evangelical Divinity School, which he chose to attend after seeing Norman Geisler, then a professor there, deliver a lecture in the spring of 1972. While there, he took courses under Geisler, John Warwick Montgomery, Clark Pinnock, John D. Woodbridge, Paul Feinberg, and J. I. Packer. He graduated summa cum laude with two master's degrees in 1975: a Master of Arts (M.A.) in the philosophy of religion and a second M.A. in church history.

In August of 1975, Craig began doctoral studies at the University of Birmingham, where he earned his Ph.D. in philosophy in 1977. He wrote his dissertation on cosmological arguments under the direction of English philosopher John Hick, with whom he developed a close relationship, and Anthony Kenny. Hick later recalled him as one of his top three students. Craig's doctoral thesis was titled, The Cosmological Argument for the Existence of God. The thesis examined the Kalam cosmological argument and updated it with scientific advancements such as the Big Bang and the laws of thermodynamics.

After receiving his doctorate, Craig enrolled with his wife at the Centre Missionnaire, a French language school in Albertville, France, for nine months beginning in January of 1977. He then was awarded a postdoctoral fellowship in July 1977 from the Alexander von Humboldt Foundation to pursue research on the Resurrection of Jesus under Wolfhart Pannenberg in Munich, Germany. He earned his second doctorate, a Doctor of Theology, from the University of Munich in 1984. As a doctoral student, he researched controversies over deism at the University of Cambridge during the summer of 1978 and passed his Rigorosum in 1982. His second doctoral dissertation was titled, The Historical Argument for the Resurrection of Jesus During the Deist Controversy.

== Academic career ==
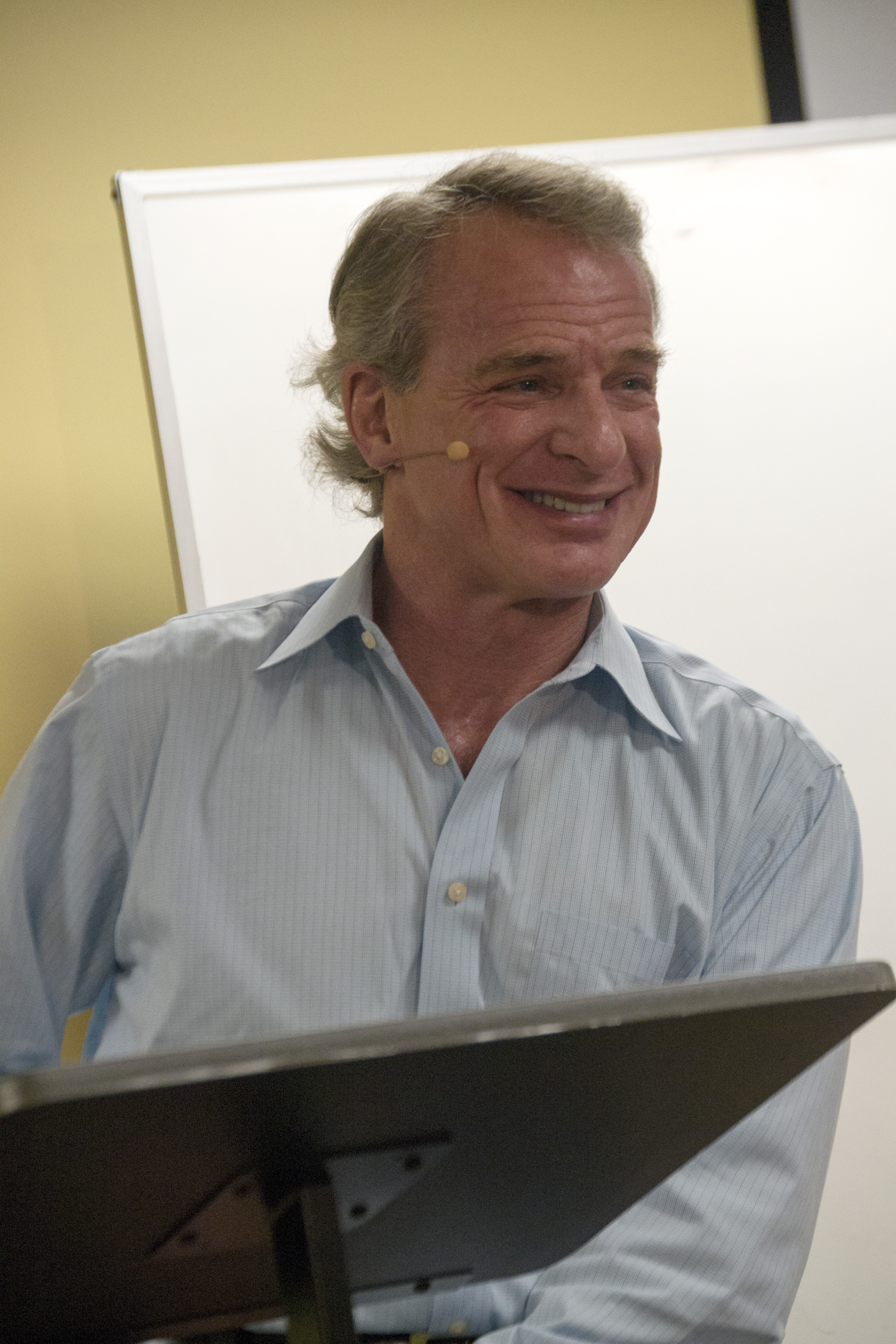
Craig in 2015

In the summer of 1979, Warren S. Benson, dean of Trinity Evangelical Divinity School (TEDS), contacted Craig to offer him an assistant professorship at the school to replace Geisler, who was moving to Dallas Theological Seminary. Craig accepted and moved from Germany to Deerfield, Illinois, to accommodate the position. He taught as an assistant professor of the philosophy of religion at TEDS from 1980 to 1986. In 1985, the school began to disband the philosophy of religion department—then consisting of only Craig and Hackett—so Craig accepted an invitation to join Agape Europe, a Campus Crusade for Christ branch. He then was an associate professor of religious studies at Westmont College from 1986 to 1987.

In 1987, Craig moved to Belgium to pursue research at the University of Louvain, where he was a visiting researcher until 1994. Afterwards, he joined the philosophy department of the new Talbot School of Theology at Biola University. At the time, the philosophy faculty consisted of only J. P. Moreland, Scott Rae, and Douglas Geivett. He was a research professor of philosophy at Talbot from 1996 to 2020. Between 1994 and 2004, Craig authored twenty books and 60 journal articles while working full-time both at Talbot and at Campus Crusade for Christ.

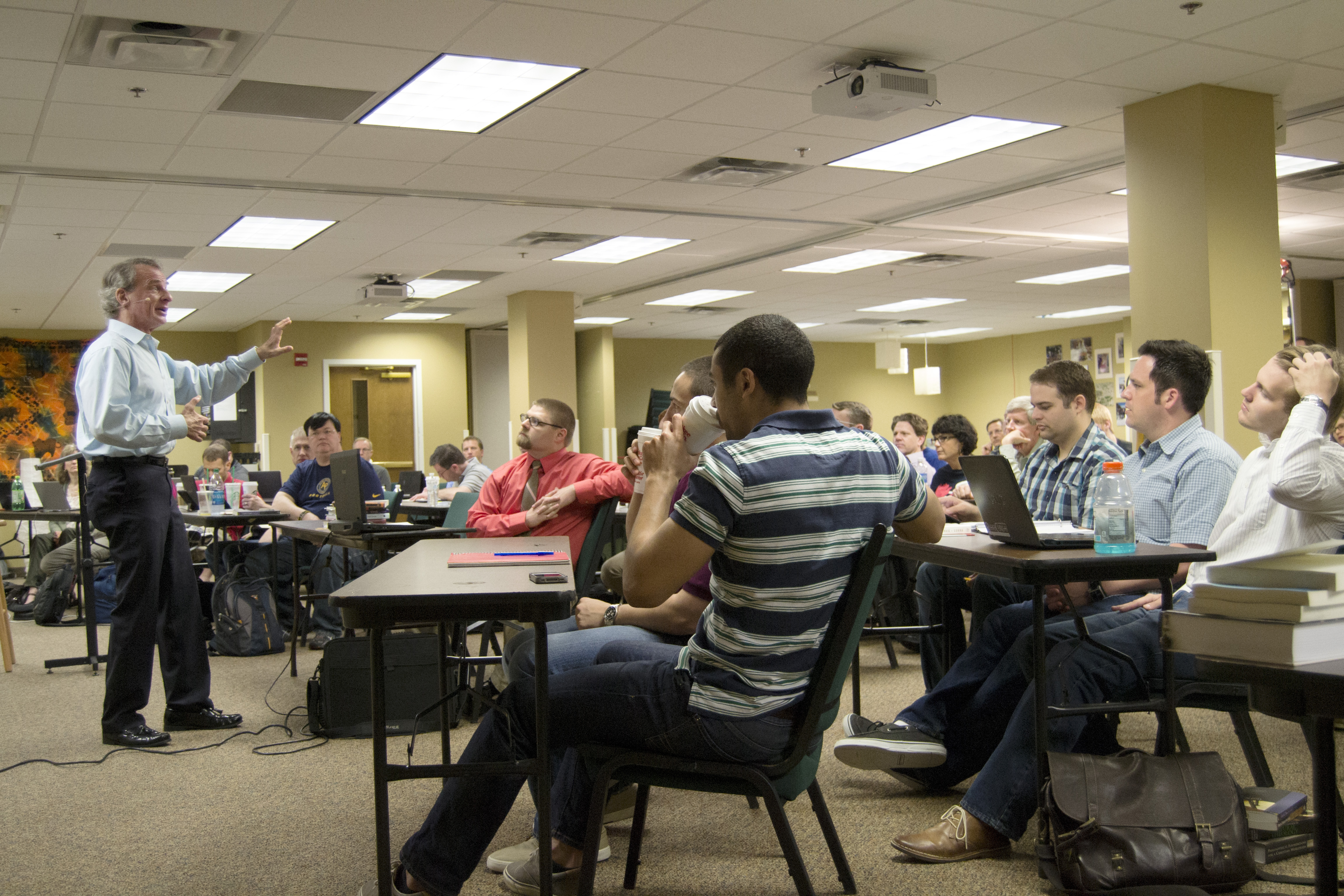
Craig (far left) teaching in Marietta, Georgia, in 2015

Craig served as president of the Evangelical Philosophical Society from 1996 to 2005. During his presidency, the society began organizing apologetics conferences alongside its annual scholarly meetings, an initiative that accompanied an expansion of the organization's activities and membership. Craig was also president of the Philosophy of Time Society from 1999 to 2006. In 2007, he established the online Christian apologetics ministry ReasonableFaith.org.

In February 2014, Craig became a professor of philosophy at Houston Baptist University while retaining his position at Talbot. He held the Houston professorship until 2024. He also held a visiting professorship in philosophy at Talbot beginning in 2021. In March 2015, Craig delivered the Edward Cadbury Lectures at the University of Birmingham, presenting a five-part lecture series titled "God Over All" concerning divine aseity and the philosophical challenge posed by Platonism. In July 2017, Biola University announced the establishment of its first endowed faculty chair, the William Lane Craig Endowed Chair in Philosophy, supported by a planned $3 million donation from Wayne and Ronnie Swindel.

As of 2026, Craig is currently a research professor emeritus of philosophy at Biola. He has authored or edited over forty books and over 200 articles in professional philosophy and theology journals. These include articles in The Journal of Philosophy, the British Journal for the Philosophy of Science, Philosophy and Phenomenological Research, Philosophical Studies, the Australasian Journal of Philosophy, Faith and Philosophy, Erkenntnis, and American Philosophical Quarterly.

== Philosophical and theological views ==
=== Kalam cosmological argument ===
An illustration of infinite regress, which Craig concludes cannot exist for temporal events

Craig is known for revitalizing the Kalām cosmological argument, (Note: Craig's own version of the Kalām argument is succinct: 1. 'Everything that begins to exist has a cause of its existence.' 2. 'The universe began to exist,' i.e., the temporal regress of events is finite. 3. 'Therefore the universe has a cause of its existence' Following Ghazali, Craig argues that this cause must be a personal will. Nothing but the arbitrary choice of a free agent could explain why the world was created at one time rather than another, or (if time comes into being with the first event) why the first event did not have a predecessor.) a version of the cosmological argument, and adapting it with scientific cosmology, an approach which later philosophers, including J. P. Moreland, have followed. The argument has been a subject of widespread discussion among contemporary philosophers of religion since Craig published his research in his book The Kalām Cosmological Argument in 1979. In his 1979 work, Craig attempts to prove the existence of God by demonstrating that the world has a beginning in time. He proposes the following syllogism as proof for a monotheistic conception of god:
1. Everything that begins to exist has a cause of its existence.
2. The universe began to exist.
3. Therefore, the universe has a cause.
The first premise of the argument relies on the uncontroversial view that, if the universe had no beginning, then "an actually infinite number of events would have occurred prior to the present moment". Craig regards the first premise as intuitively obvious, holding that it ultimately rests "upon the metaphysical intuition that something cannot come out of nothing". He further argues that the cause must be a personal agent who freely chooses to create, because an eternal, impersonal set of conditions would have produced a universe that existed from eternity.

Craig's defense of the argument mainly focuses on the second premise, in which he offers four a priori and a posteriori arguments in favor. He also supports the second premise by citing increasing evidence for the Big bang theory and by the second law of thermodynamics. He gives two philosophical arguments against the possibility of an infinite past: the first appeals to paradoxes allegedly generated by the idea of an actual infinite, and the second appeals to a dynamic theory of time to argue that an infinite series of events could not have been formed by successive addition. One of the examples Craig often uses to show that an actual infinite is impossible in the real world is Hilbert's Hotel.

Craig is the foremost advocate of the Kalām cosmological argument among contemporary philosophers. While the Kalam originated in medieval Islamic philosophy, it remains influential among Christian philosophers, with Craig and Moreland as its most notable proponents. It continues to be a subject of extensive debate, even among theistic philosophers. Commentators on the argument include: Adolf Grünbaum, Quentin Smith, Wes Morriston, Graham Oppy, Andrew Loke, Robert C. Koons, and Alexander Pruss.

=== Divine omniscience ===
Craig is a proponent of Molinism, an idea first formulated by the Jesuit theologian Luis de Molina according to which God possesses foreknowledge of which free actions each person would perform under every possible circumstance, a kind of knowledge that is sometimes termed "middle knowledge". Protestant-Molinism, such as Craig's, first entered Protestant theology through two anti-Calvinist thinkers: Jacobus Arminius and Conrad Vorstius. Molinists such as Craig appeal to this idea to reconcile the perceived conflict between God's providence and foreknowledge with human free will. The idea is that, by relying on middle knowledge, God does not interfere with anyone's free will, instead choosing which circumstances to actualize given a complete understanding of how people would freely choose to act in response. Craig also appeals to Molinism in his discussions of the inspiration of scripture, Christian exclusivism, the perseverance of the Saints, and missionary evangelism.

=== Resurrection of Jesus ===
Craig has written two volumes arguing for the historicity of the resurrection of Jesus, The Historical Argument for the Resurrection of Jesus (1985) and Assessing the New Testament Evidence for the Historicity of the Resurrection of Jesus (3rd ed., 2002). In the former volume, Craig describes the history of the discussion, including David Hume's arguments against the identification of miracles. The latter volume is an exegetical study of the New Testament material pertinent to the resurrection.

Craig structures his arguments for the historicity of the resurrection under 3 headings:

1. The tomb of Jesus was found empty by a group of his female followers on the Sunday after his crucifixion.
2. Various individuals and groups experienced appearances of Jesus alive after his death.
3. The earliest disciples came to believe that God had raised Jesus from the dead despite strong predispositions to the contrary.

Craig argues that the best explanation of these three events is a literal resurrection. He applies an evaluative framework developed by philosopher of history C. Behan McCullagh to examine various theoretical explanations proposed for these events. From that framework, he rejects alternative theories such as Gerd Lüdemann's hallucination hypothesis, the conspiracy hypothesis, and Heinrich Paulus or Friedrich Schleiermacher's apparent death hypothesis as lacking explanatory scope, explanatory power, and sufficient historical plausibility. In 1996 Craig participated in the Resurrection Summit, a meeting held at St. Joseph's Seminary, New York, in order to discuss the resurrection of Jesus. Papers from the summit were later compiled and published in the book The Resurrection. An Interdisciplinary Symposium on the Resurrection of Jesus, edited by S.T Davis, D. Kendall and G. O'Collins.

=== Philosophy of time ===
Craig defends a presentist version of the A-theory of time. According to this theory, the present exists, but the past and future do not. Additionally, he holds that there are tensed facts, such as it is now lunchtime, which cannot be reduced to or identified with tenseless facts of the form it is lunchtime at noon on February 10, 2020. According to this theory, presentness is a real aspect of time, and not merely a projection of our thought and talk about time. He raises several defenses of this theory, two of which are especially notable. First, he criticizes J. M. E. McTaggart's argument that the A-theory is incoherent, suggesting that McTaggart's argument begs the question by covertly presupposing the B-theory. Second, he defends the A-theory from empirical challenges arising from the standard interpretation of Einstein's special theory of relativity (SR). He responds to this challenge by advocating a neo-Lorentzian interpretation of SR which is empirically equivalent to the standard interpretation, and which is consistent with the A-theory and with absolute simultaneity. Craig criticizes the standard interpretation of SR on the grounds that it is based on a discredited positivist epistemology. Moreover, he claims that the assumption of positivism invalidates the appeal to SR made by opponents of the A-theory.

=== Divine eternity ===
Craig argues that God existed in a timeless state causally prior to creation, but has existed in a temporal state beginning with creation, by virtue of His knowledge of tensed facts and His interactions with events. He gives two arguments in support of that view. First, he says that, given his tensed view of time, God cannot be timeless once He has created a temporal universe, since, after that point, He is related to time through his interactions and through causing events in time. Second, Craig says that as a feature of His omniscience, God must know the truth related to tensed facts about the world, such as whether the statement "Today is January 15th" is true or not or what is happening right now. (Note: When Craig says that God is timeless "prior to" the creation of time, the relevant notion of priority is not supposed to be temporal, as there is no time temporally prior to the first moment of time. Rather, Craig means to suggest that God is prior to time in some non-temporal sense that is difficult to specify, and which involves the idea that God was the cause of the universe. Several philosophers have argued that Craig's notion of non-temporal priority is not clear. Craig has attempted to clarify his view in response.)

=== Divine aseity ===
Craig has published on the challenge posed by platonism to divine aseity or self-existence. Craig rejects both the view that God creates abstract objects and that they exist independently of God. Rather, he defends a nominalistic perspective that abstract objects are not ontologically real objects. Stating that the Quine–Putnam indispensability argument is the chief support of platonism, Craig criticizes the neo-Quinean criterion of ontological commitment, according to which the existential quantifier of first order logic and singular terms are devices of ontological commitment.

Craig favors a neutral interpretation of the quantifiers of first-order logic, so that a statement can be true, even if there is not an object being quantified over. Moreover, he defends a deflationary theory of reference based on the intentionality of agents, so that a person can successfully refer to something even in the absence of some extra-mental thing. Craig gives the example of the statement "the price of the ticket is ten dollars" which he argues can still be a true statement even if there is not an actual object called a "price". He defines these references as a speech act rather than a word-world relation, so that singular terms may be used in true sentences without commitment to corresponding objects in the world. Craig has additionally argued that even if one were to grant that these references were being used as in a word-world relation, that fictionalism is a viable explanation of their use; in particular pretense theory, according to which statements about abstract objects are expressions of make-believe, imagined to be true, even if literally false.

=== Atonement ===
In preparation for writing a systematic philosophical theology, Craig undertook a study of the doctrine of the atonement which resulted in two books, The Atonement (2019) and Atonement and the Death of Christ (2020).

=== Historical Adam ===
Also as a preliminary study for his systematic philosophical theology Craig explored the biblical commitment to and scientific credibility of an original human pair who were the universal progenitors of mankind. Following the Assyriologist Thorkild Jacobsen, Craig argues on the basis of various family resemblances that Genesis 1-11 plausibly belongs to the genre of mytho-history, which aims to recount historical persons and events in the figurative and often fantastic language of myth. Most recently Craig has begun writing a projected multi-volume systematic philosophical theology.

=== Other views ===
Craig is a critic of metaphysical naturalism, New Atheism, and prosperity theology, as well as a defender of Reformed epistemology. He also states that a confessing Christian should not engage in homosexual acts. Craig maintains that the theory of evolution is compatible with Christianity. He is a fellow of the Discovery Institute's Center for Science and Culture and was a fellow of the International Society for Complexity, Information, and Design. In his debate with Paul Helm, Craig explains that he would call himself an "Arminian" "in the proper sense." He identifies with the Wesleyan tradition.

As a non-voluntaristic divine command theorist, Craig believes God had the moral right to command the killing of the Canaanites if they refused to leave their land, as depicted in the Book of Deuteronomy. This has led to some controversy, as seen in a critique by Wes Morriston. Craig has also proposed a neo-Apollinarian Christology in which the divine logos stands in for the human soul of Christ and completes his human nature.

== Reception ==
According to Nathan Schneider, "[many] professional philosophers know about him only vaguely, but in the field of philosophy of religion, [Craig's] books and articles are among the most cited". Philosopher Quentin Smith, in the Internet Encyclopedia of Philosophy, writes that "William Lane Craig is one [of] the leading philosophers of religion and one of the leading philosophers of time".

In 2021, Academic Influence ranked Craig the nineteenth most influential philosopher in the world over the previous three decades (1990–2020) and the world's fourth most influential theologian over the same period.

In 2009, New Atheist Christopher Hitchens had an interview before his debate with Craig in that same year. During that interview, Hitchens said: "I can tell you that my brothers and sisters and co-thinkers in the unbelieving community take [Craig] very seriously. He's thought of as a very tough guy. Very rigorous, very scholarly, very formidable. [...] I say that without reserve. I don't say it because I'm here. Normally, I don't get people saying: 'Good luck tonight' and 'don't let us down', you know. But with him, I do."

In 2011, with respect and compliment to his debating skills, New Atheist Sam Harris once described Craig as "the one Christian apologist who seems to have put the fear of God into many of my fellow atheists". Later in the year, Craig invited atheist Richard Dawkins to a debate at the Sheldonian Theatre in Oxford. When Dawkins refused, claiming it was just "self-promotion", Craig instead gave a lecture with an empty chair before a panel of 3 criticising Dawkins' arguments.

In 2014, he was named alumnus of the year by Wheaton College.

After his debate with Craig in 2014, Sean Carroll expressed frustration: "the following pattern repeated multiple times: Craig would make an argument, I would reply, and Craig would just repeat the original argument".

In 2016, Craig was named Alumnus of the Year by Trinity Evangelical Divinity School.

== Personal life ==
Craig married Jan Coleman, a graduate of the University of North Dakota whom he met while they were both working as Campus Crusade for Christ staff at Northern Illinois University, on May 13, 1972. They have two children and reside in Atlanta, Georgia. Their daughter, Charity, was born in May 1982. Their son, John, was born in May 1984.

== Selected publications ==
- Craig, William Lane (1979). The Kalām Cosmological Argument. London: MacMillan. ISBN 978-1-57910-438-2.
- Craig, William Lane (1980). The Cosmological Argument from Plato to Leibniz. London: MacMillan. ISBN 978-1-57910-787-1.
- Craig, William Lane (1981). The Son Rises: Historical evidence for the resurrection of Jesus. Chicago: Moody Press. ISBN 978-1-57910-464-1.
- Apologetics: An Introduction. Chicago: Moody Press. 1984. ISBN 0-8024-0405-7
- Reasonable Faith. Wheaton: Crossway. 1984 (1st ed), 1994 (2nd ed), 2008 (3rd ed). ISBN 0-89107-764-2 / ISBN 978-0-89107-764-0
- The Historical Argument for the Resurrection of Jesus During the Deist Controversy. Lewiston, New York: Edwin Mellen Press. 1985. ISBN 0-88946-811-7
- The Only Wise God: The Compatibility of Divine Foreknowledge and Human Freedom. Grand Rapids: Baker Bookhouse. 1987. ISBN 1-57910-316-2, 978-1-57910-316-3
- The Problem of Divine Foreknowledge and Future Contingents from Aristotle to Suarez. Leiden: E.J. Brill. 1988. ISBN 90-04-08516-5 / ISBN 978-90-04-08516-9
- Knowing the Truth About the Resurrection. Ann Arbor: Servant. 1988. ISBN 0-89283-384-X, 978-0-89283-384-9
- Craig, William Lane (1989). Assessing the New Testament Evidence for the Historicity of the Resurrection of Jesus. Studies in the Bible and early Christianity. Vol. 16. Lewiston, New York: Edwin Mellen Press. ISBN 978-0-88946-616-6.
- Divine Foreknowledge and Human Freedom: The Coherence of Theism I: Omniscience. Leiden: E.J. Brill. 1990. ISBN 90-04-09250-1, 978-90-04-09250-1
- No Easy Answers: Finding Hope in Doubt, Failure, and Unanswered Prayer. Chicago: Moody Press. 1990. ISBN 0-8024-2283-7, 978-0-8024-2283-5
- Craig, William Lane (1991). Divine Foreknowledge and Human Freedom: The Coherence of Theism: Omniscience. BRILL. ISBN 978-90-04-09250-1.
- ——— (1991). Divine Foreknowledge and Human Freedom: The Coherence of Theism: Omniscience. Brill. ISBN 978-90-04-09250-1..
- Theism, Atheism, and Big Bang Cosmology (with Quentin Smith). Oxford: Clarendon Press. 1993. ISBN 978-0-19-826383-8
- The Tensed Theory of Time: A Critical Examination. Dordrecht: Kluwer Academic Publishers. ISBN 0-7923-6634-4 / ISBN 978-0-7923-6634-8
- Will the Real Jesus Please Stand Up? A Debate Between William Lane Craig and John Dominic Crossan. Grand Rapids: Baker Bookhouse. 1998.
- God, Are You There?. Atlanta: RZIM. 1999. ISBN 1-930107-00-5, 978-1-930107-00-7
- Craig, William Lane; Lüdemann, Gerd (2000). Copan, Paul; Tacelli, Ronald Keith (eds.). Jesus' Resurrection: Fact Or Figment? a Debate Between William Lane Craig & Gerd Lüdemann. InterVarsity Press. ISBN 978-0-8308-1569-2.
- ——— (2000). The tensed theory of time: a critical examination. Springer. ISBN 978-0-7923-6634-8.
- ——— (2000). The Tenseless Theory of Time: A Critical Examination. Dordrecht: Kluwer. ISBN 978-0-7923-6635-5..
- God, Time and Eternity. Dordrecht: Kluwer Academic Publishers. 2001. ISBN 978-1-58134-241-3 / ISBN 978-1-58134-241-3
- Time and The Metaphysics of Relativity. Dordrecht: Kluwer Academic Publishers. 2001. ISBN 0-7923-6668-9
- Time and Eternity: Exploring God's Relationship to Time. Wheaton: Crossway. 2001. ISBN 978-1-58134-241-3 / ISBN 978-1-58134-241-3
- What Does God Know? Atlanta: RZIM. 2002. ISBN 978-1-930107-05-2
- Hard Questions, Real Answers. Wheaton: Crossway Books. 2003. ISBN 978-1-58134-487-5 / ISBN 978-1-58134-487-5
- Philosophical Foundations for a Christian Worldview (with J.P. Moreland). Downers Grove: InterVarsity Press. 2003.
- Craig, William Lane; Flew, Antony; Wallace, Stan W. (2003). Does God Exist?: The Craig-Flew Debate. Ashgate. ISBN 978-0-7546-3190-3..
- ———; Sinnott-Armstrong, Walter (2004). God?: A Debate Between a Christian and an Atheist. Oxford University Press. ISBN 978-0-19-516599-9.
- ———; Copan, Paul (2004). Creation out of Nothing: A Biblical, Philosophical, and Scientific Exploration. Grand Rapids: Baker Bookhouse. ISBN 0-8010-2733-0.
- ——— (2008). Smith, Quentin (ed.). Einstein, relativity and absolute simultaneity. London; New York: Routledge. ISBN 978-0415591669.
- ——— (July 3, 2008). "God is Not Dead Yet: How current philosophers argue for his existence". Christianity Today.
- On Guard: Defending Your Faith with Reason and Precision. Colorado Springs: David C. Cook. 2010. ISBN 1-4347-6488-5 / ISBN 978-1-4347-6488-1
- A Reasonable Response: Answers to Tough Questions on God, Christianity, and the Bible (with Joseph E. Gorra). Chicago: Moody Publishers. 2014. ISBN 0-80240599-1 / ISBN 978-0-80240599-9
- Learning Logic. 2014. ISBN 1502713764 / ISBN 978-1-50271376-6
- On Guard for Students: A Thinker's Guide to the Christian Faith. Colorado Springs: David C. Cook. 2015. ISBN 0-78141299-4 / ISBN 978-0-78141299-5
- ——— (2016). God Over All: Divine Aseity and the Challenge of Platonism. New York, NY: Oxford University Press. ISBN 978-0-19-878688-7.
- ——— (2017). God and Abstract Objects: The Coherence of Theism III: Aseity. Berlin: Springer. ISBN 978-3-319-55383-2.
- ——— (2020). Atonement and the Death of Christ: An Exegetical, Historical, and Philosophical Exploration. Waco, TX: Baylor University Press. ISBN 978-1-4813-1204-2.
- ——— (2021). In Quest of the Historical Adam: A Biblical and Scientific Exploration. Grand Rapids, MI: Eerdmans. ISBN 978-0-8028-7911-0.

== See also ==
- List of American philosophers
