= Selma Borg =

American translator (1838–1921)

Selma Josefina Borg
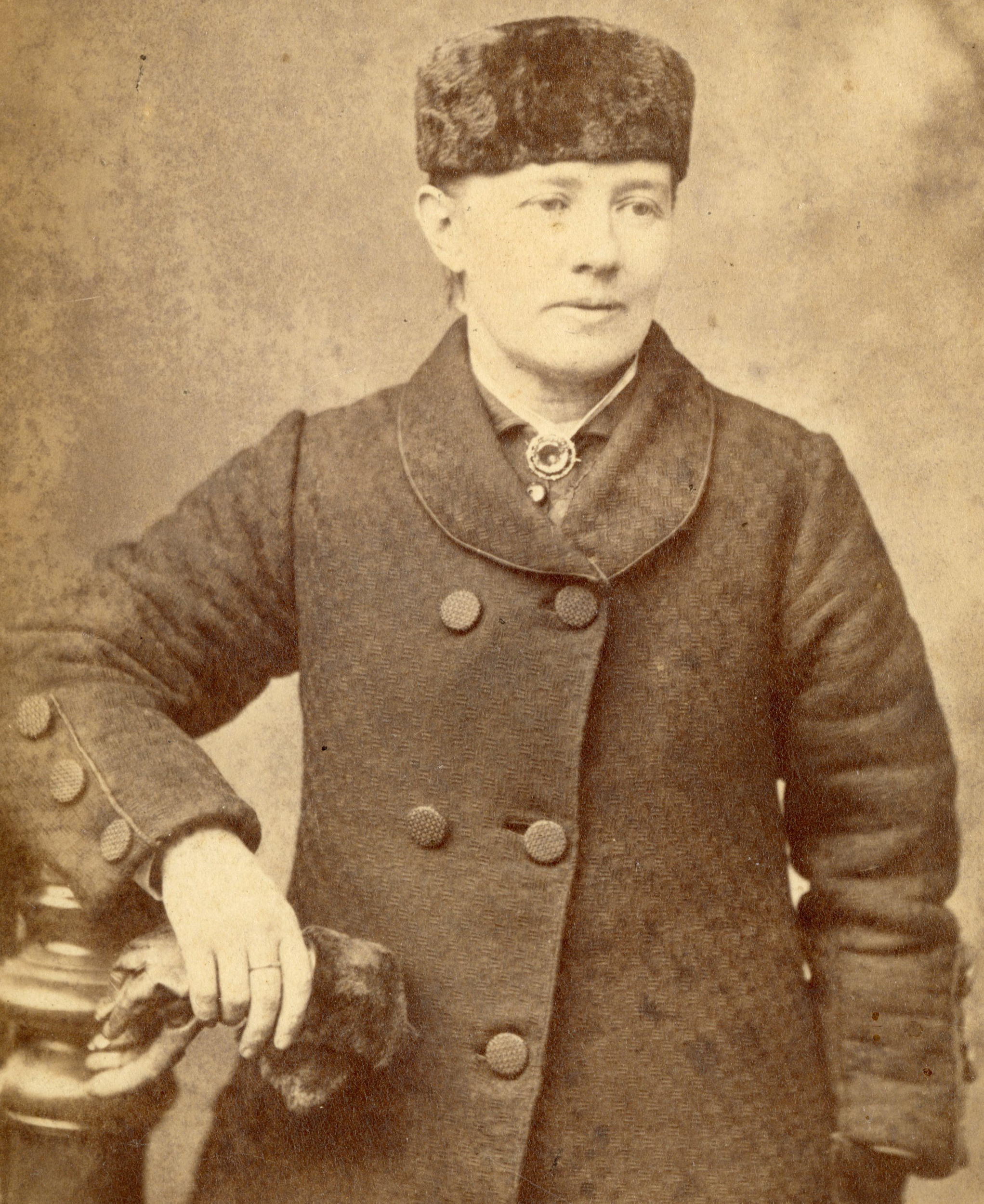
- 1879 carte de visite of Selma Borg
- Born: October 11, 1838; Gamlakarleby, Grand Duchy of Finland, Russian Empire
- Died: October 29, 1921 (aged 83); Atlantic City, New Jersey, U.S.
- Resting place: Mount Moriah Cemetery, Philadelphia, Pennsylvania, U.S.
- Occupation: Translator

Selma Josefina Borg (October 11, 1838 – October 29, 1921) was an American translator of Swedish and Finnish literature. In her later life, she conducted musical performances and gave lectures about Scandinavian folklore and history. She was the first native Finnish-speaker to publish an English-language partial translation of the Finnish epic Kalevala.

== Early life ==
Selma Josefina Borg was born on October 11, 1838, in Gamlakarleby, Grand Duchy of Finland (present-day Kokkola, Finland), a predominately Swedish-speaking area. She was the youngest of nine children in a relatively well-to-do, middle-class family. Her grandfather, Carl Borg, was a priest and poet, and she was distantly related to the composer Jean Sibelius through him. She studied music in Finland, Sweden, and Switzerland before immigrating to the United States.

== Translator ==
In 1865, Borg arrived in Philadelphia where she taught music and languages. While there, she made the acquaintance of Marie A. Brown. The pair, who were interested in bringing Nordic literature to the attention of English-reading audiences, began collaborating on translations of Marie Sophie Schwartz's popular novels. According to a contemporary report, Borg would translate the Swedish to English, then Brown would polish the result into a more literary form. The translations differed from other U.S.-published translations of Nordic works at the time, which typically were translated into English from German translations of the original; however, critics found the translations to be "very badly executed." The pair had a falling out with their first publisher, Lee & Shepard of Boston, resulting in a lawsuit that they won. They eventually landed at Porter & Coates in Philadelphia, which continued to publish their translations, including the first part of Zacharias Topelius's Fältskärn stories and a collection of translated fairy tales, folktales, and children's stories. After a flurry of co-authored translations from 1870 to 1874, Borg and Brown had an extreme falling out that ended their collaboration.

Borg also translated works into Swedish, notably Marie Elizabeth Zakrzewska's autobiography, A Practical Illustration of Woman's Right to Labor. It was published by Sigfrid Flodin in Stockholm in 1871 under the title Huru hinder brytas ("How to Break the Barrier").

== Conductor and lecturer ==
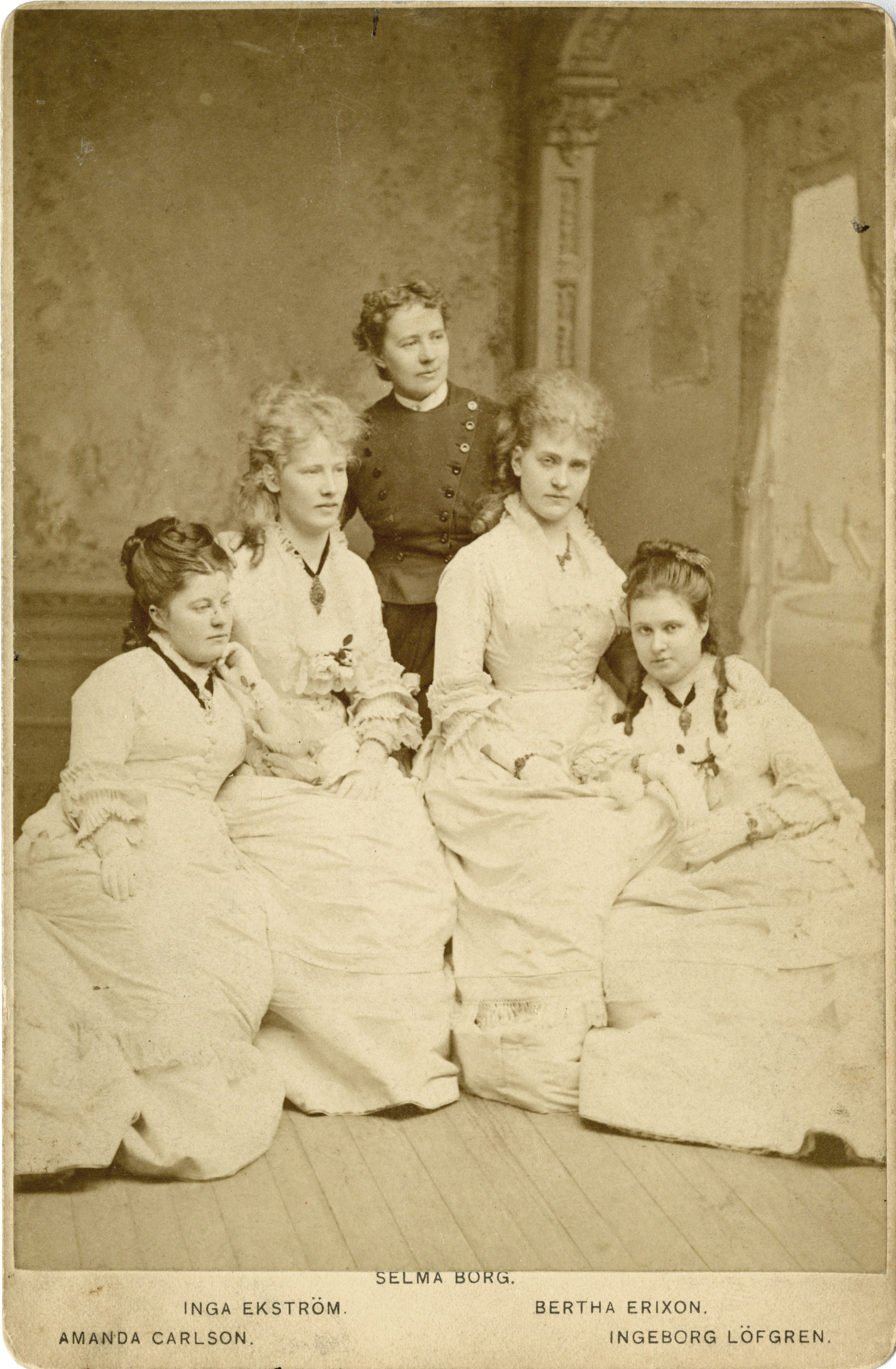
Borg with the Swedish Ladies Quartette c. 1877. From left, Amanda Carlson, Inga Ekström, Borg, Bertha Erixon, and Ingeborg Löfgren.

In line with her background as a music teacher and performer, Borg was interested in bringing Nordic folk and popular music to North America. With Brown, she produced in the 1870s arrangements and English-language lyrics for Swedish and Finnish traditional and popular songs, which were published by G. Schirmer and Louis Meyer. The Atlantic reviewed one of these collections of sheet music favorably, saying "We are very glad to see so copious a collection of genuine, pure people's-music offered to the public in so acceptable a shape."

In spring 1875, Borg returned to Finland to deliver lectures across Finland and Sweden about the role of women in American society. She previously, at the request of Julia Ward Howe, had translated reports about the 1870 Women's Peace Meeting for publication in Sweden. Her 1875 trip was sponsored by a Philadelphia women's organization, which wanted to promote interest in the 1876 Centennial Exposition.

After returning to the United States, Borg turned her attention to promoting Finnish and Swedish music, leading tours and performances primarily on the east coast where she conducted performances intermixed with short "parlor lectures." These lectures focused mostly on the culture and history of Sweden, Finland, and Russia, but she sometimes was more philosophical, discussing concepts like peace, freedom, and individuality.

In 1877, she accompanied a quartet of Swedish singers across Canada and the northern United States. By the end of the decade, she was focused on promoting Finnish music through lectures and performances of folk songs culminating in a "Grand Concert" in Boston on May 16, 1879. The concert had the support of luminaries like Henry Wadsworth Longfellow and Julius Eichberg, and was well reviewed in the Boston press. After the Grand Concert, Borg continued to tour, primarily in New England, lecturing about the Kalevala and Finnish mythology, as well as continuing to perform Nordic music.

== Later life ==
Borg made one last trip to Finland in 1882 where she met with a reporter from the Åbo Underrättelser newspaper and discussed her work promoting Finnish culture to audiences in the United States. That same year, University Press in Cambridge, Massachusetts, published her translation of the first song of Kalevala to accompany her lectures on the epic. Partial translations into English had been made in the late 1860s, both directly from Finnish and via a German translation, but Borg's was the first Kalevala translation by a native Finnish speaker. Borg expressed hopes to translate more of the epic, but nothing further was published. She continued her lecture tours until the end of her life in 1921.

Borg died in Atlantic City, New Jersey, on October 29, 1921, and was buried in Philadelphia.
