= Andrew Loke =

Singaporean theologian

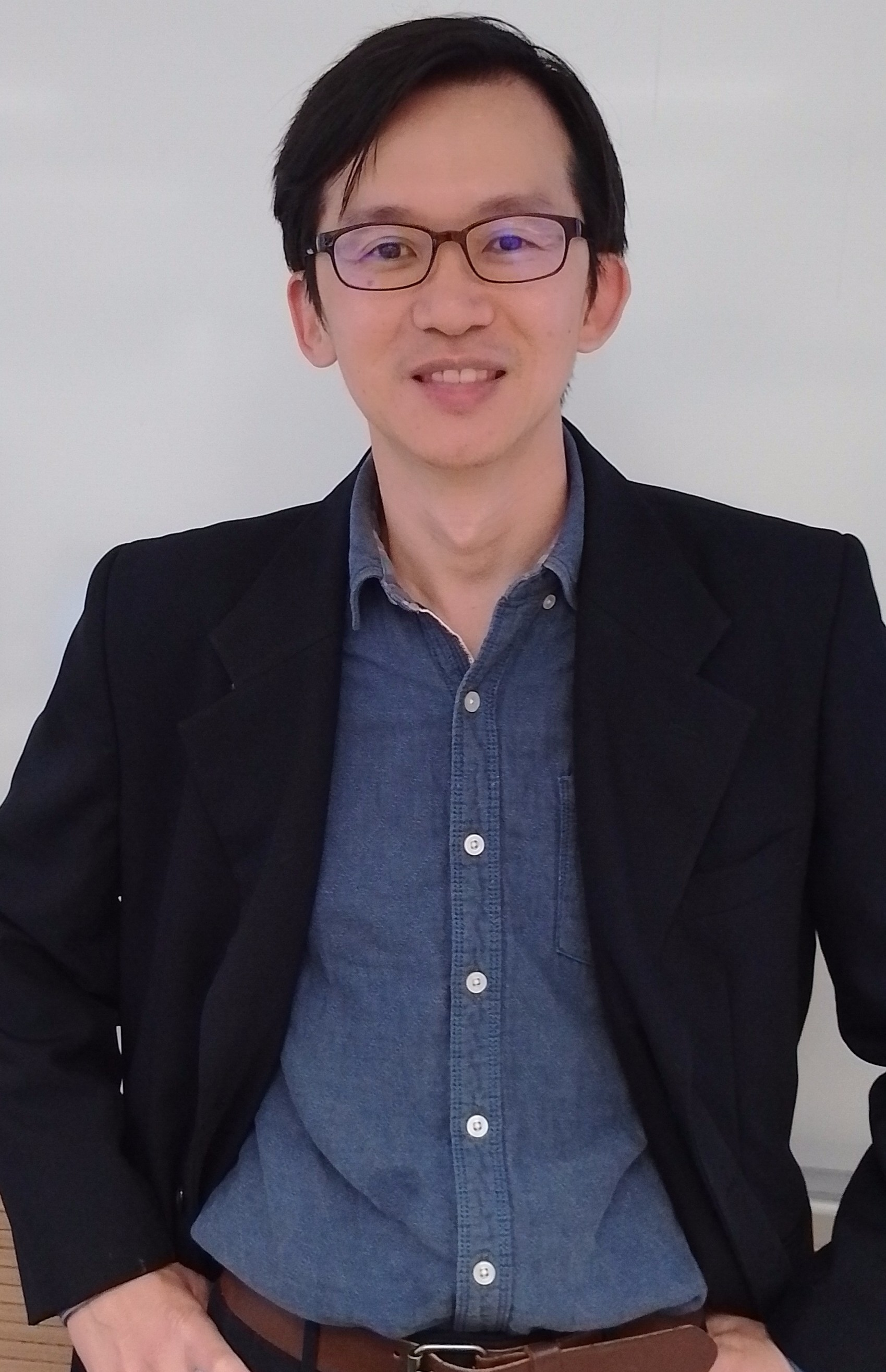
Loke at Hong Kong Baptist University, January 2023

Luo De En (Chinese: 骆德恩; pinyin: Luò Dé Ēn), commonly anglicized as "Andrew Loke" for convenience, is a Singaporean Christian theologian and philosopher. He is currently associate professor in the Department of Religion and Philosophy at Hong Kong Baptist University. He has made contributions to the fields of Systematic Theology, Science and Religion, Philosophy of Religion, and New Testament studies. He is a proponent of the Kalam Cosmological Argument for the existence of God. He is an elected Fellow of the International Society for Science and Religion.

== Early background and career ==
After graduating from Faculty of Medicine, National University of Singapore, Loke worked as a medical doctor. He completed his M.A in philosophy at Biola University and Ph.D. in theology at King's College London under the supervision of Alister McGrath. In 2014, he joined University of Hong Kong as Research Assistant Professor and was invited to teach Faith and Science at Regent College Vancouver and Master of Theology at Singapore Bible College.

== Public debates ==
Loke has debated the existence of God and the historicity of the resurrection of Jesus with prominent scholars, including Graham Oppy, Alex Malpass, and Shabir Ally.

== Publications ==
- Loke, Andrew. 2014. A Kryptic Model of the Incarnation. Routledge New Critical Thinking in Religion, Theology and Biblical Studies series. London: Routledge.
- Loke, Andrew. 2017. The Origins of Divine Christology. Society for New Testament Studies Monograph Series 169. Cambridge: Cambridge University Press.
- Loke, Andrew. 2017. God and Ultimate Origins: A Novel Cosmological Argument. Palgrave Frontiers in Philosophy of Religion Series. Cham, Switzerland: Springer Nature.
- Loke, Andrew. 2020. Investigating the Resurrection of Jesus Christ: A New Transdisciplinary Approach. Routledge New Critical Thinking in Religion, Theology and Biblical Studies series. London: Routledge.
- Loke, Andrew. 2022. The Teleological and Kalam Cosmological Arguments Revisited. Palgrave
- Loke, Andrew. 2022. The Origin of Humanity and Evolution: Science and Scripture in Conversation. Bloomsbury Publishing
- Loke, Andrew. 2022. Evil, Sin, and Christian Theism. Routledge
- Loke, Andrew. 2023. Studies on the Origin of Divine and Resurrection Christology. Cascade Books.
- Loke, Andrew. 2025. Natural Theology: A Reassessment. Routledge

== See also ==
- Kalam Cosmological Argument
