= In Quest of the Historical Adam =

2021 book by William Lane Craig

In Quest of the Historical Adam: A Biblical and Scientific Exploration is a 2021 book by the Christian philosopher William Lane Craig.

== Sources ==
- Spencer, Daniel (2022). "William Lane Craig. In Quest of the Historical Adam: A Biblical and Scientific Exploration". Journal of Analytic Theology. 10: 700–705. doi:10.12978/jat.2022-10.030011181517. ISSN 2330-2380.
- Gaine, Simon Francis (2023). "In Quest of the Historical Adam: A Biblical and Scientific Exploration by William Lane Craig". New Blackfriars. 104 (1109): 129–131. doi:10.1111/nbfr.12791. ISSN 0028-4289.
