= Kálmán Nagy =

Hungarian politician (born 1946)

Member of the National Assembly
- In office 16 May 2006 – 5 May 2014

Personal details
- Born: August 27, 1946 (age 79) Nagydobos, Hungary
- Party: Fidesz; KDNP
- Profession: physician

Dr. Kálmán Nagy (born 27 August 1946) is a Hungarian physician, member of the National Assembly (MP) for Miskolc (Borsod-Abaúj-Zemplén County Constituency III) between 2010 and 2014. He was also MP from the Borsod-Abaúj-Zemplén County Regional List of the Christian Democratic People's Party (KDNP) between 2006 and 2010.

== Biography ==
Nagy graduated with "Summa cum laude" from the Medical University of Debrecen in 1971. He was candidate of medical sciences in 1987. He is a haematologist, immunologist and paediatrician specialist. He obtained scholarships in Paris, France and Germany. He received several professional and public awards for his activities. He was doctor honoris of West University of Timișoara. The first bone-marrow transplant was performed with his leading in Romania first of all over the world he transplanted childhood immune patient with unfamiliar bone-narrow cells.

At present he is head physician of Children Oncological and Bone-marrow transplant Ward of Borsod-Abaúj Zemplén County Hospital and University Educational Hospital. Between 1992 and 2000 he was head of department of Postgraduate Medical University and II. Paediatrician Department of Semmelweis University of Medicine. In 1991 he established the Bonta Foundation with his colleague which supports the treatment of tumorous children. He has published about 100 bulletins of heath in English and Hungarian, 40 publications about social problems.

He became a member of presidium of the Cultural Branch of Fidesz. He was President of Country Cultural Branch. He is also a member of Christian Democratic People's Party (KDNP). In the 2006 parliamentary election he obtained a mandate from Fidesz–KDNP's Borsod-Abaúj-Zemplén County Regional list. He was appointed a member of the Committee on Heath Affairs on 30 May 2006. He was elected MP for Miskolc during the 2010 parliamentary election.
