= Emergent Universe =

Cosmological models

An emergent Universe cosmological model features cosmic inflation applied to a static universe. They have no singularity, time zero, or horizon problem. Following the inflation era, reheating leads to hot-Big Bang era as in standard cosmology. A version proposed by George Ellis and others involves the Universe shaped like a 3-dimensional sphere (or another compact manifold) until a rolling scalar field begins inflating it. These models avoid both an initial singularity and a quantum gravity era.

== Criticism ==
This proposal has been criticised by Vilenkin and Mithani and on different grounds by Aguirre and Kehayias as inconsistent if quantum-mechanical effects are taken into account.
