= Norman Malcolm =

American philosopher (1911–1990)

- Born: Norman Adrian Malcolm; 11 June 1911; Selden, Kansas, U.S.
- Died: 4 August 1990 (aged 79); London, England

Education
- Education: University of Nebraska; Harvard University
- Doctoral advisor: C. I. Lewis
- Other advisors: O. K. Bouwsma; G. E. Moore; Ludwig Wittgenstein

Philosophical work
- Era: 20th-century philosophy
- Region: Western philosophy
- School: Analytic philosophy
- Institutions: Cornell University
- Doctoral students: Sydney Shoemaker
- Notable students: John Rawls
- Main interests: Epistemology, philosophy of mind, philosophy of psychology
- Notable ideas: Criticism of common sense beliefs, ontological argument from the distinction between necessary and contingent beings

Norman Adrian Malcolm (/ˈmælkəm/; 11 June 1911 – 4 August 1990) was an American philosopher. Malcolm was primarily active in the fields of epistemology, philosophy of mind, and philosophy of psychology. He was among the most important and influential of the ordinary-language philosophers in the United States.

== Biography ==
Malcolm was born in Selden, Kansas. He studied philosophy with O. K. Bouwsma at the University of Nebraska, then enrolled as a graduate student at Harvard University in 1933.

At Cambridge University in 1938–9, he met G. E. Moore and Ludwig Wittgenstein. Malcolm attended Wittgenstein's lectures on the philosophical foundations of mathematics throughout 1939 and remained one of Wittgenstein's closest friends. Malcolm's memoir of his time with Wittgenstein, published in 1958, is widely acclaimed as one of the most captivating and most accurate portraits of Wittgenstein's remarkable personality.

After serving in the United States Navy from 1942 to 1945, Malcolm, with his wife, Leonida, and their son, Raymond Charles Malcolm, resided in Cambridge again in 1946–1947. He saw a good deal of Wittgenstein during that time, and they continued to correspond frequently thereafter. In 1947, Malcolm joined the faculty of the Sage School of Philosophy at Cornell University, where he taught until his retirement. In 1949, Wittgenstein was a guest of the Malcolms in Ithaca, New York. In that year Malcolm introduced O. K. Bouwsma to Wittgenstein. Bouwsma remained close to Wittgenstein until Wittgenstein's death in 1951.

Malcolm was a Fulbright research fellow at University of Helsinki during the academic year of 1960–1961. From 1972 to 1973 he was President of the Eastern Division of the American Philosophical Association and in 1975 joined the American Academy of Arts and Sciences.

Malcolm lived in London for the last 12 years of his life where he was appointed as a visiting professor and, shortly before his death, a fellow at King's College London.

He died there in 1990.

== Philosophical work ==
In 1959, his book Dreaming was published, in which he elaborated on Wittgenstein's question as to whether it really mattered if people who tell dreams "really had these images while they slept, or whether it merely seems so to them on waking". This work was also a response to Descartes' Meditations.

Other than that he is known for propagating the view that common sense philosophy and ordinary language philosophy are the same. He was generally supportive of Moore's theory of knowledge and certitude, though he found Moore's style and method of arguing to be ineffective. His critique of Moore's articles on skepticism (and also on Moore's 'Here is a hand' argument) lay the foundation for the renewed interest in common sense philosophy and ordinary language philosophy. He was among the most important and influential of the ordinary-language philosophers in the United States.

Malcolm was also a defender of a modal version of the ontological argument. In 1960 he argued that the argument originally presented by Anselm of Canterbury in the second chapter of his Proslogion was just an inferior version of the argument propounded in chapter three. His argument is similar to those produced by Charles Hartshorne and Alvin Plantinga. Malcolm argued that a God cannot simply exist as a matter of contingency but rather must exist in necessity if at all. He argued that if God exists in contingency then his existence is subject to a series of conditions that would then be greater than God and this would be a contradiction (referring to Anselm's definition of God as That than which Nothing Greater can be Conceived).

== Publications ==
=== Books ===
- (1958) Ludwig Wittgenstein: A Memoir (with a biographical sketch by G. H. von Wright).
- (1959) Dreaming.
- (1963) Knowledge and Certainty: Essays and Lectures.
- (1971) Problems of Mind: Descartes to Wittgenstein ISBN 9781032102924.
- (1977) Memory and Mind ISBN 9780801410185.
- (1977) Thought and Knowledge: Essays doi:10.7591/9781501738760 ISBN 9781501738760
- (1982) Wittgenstein: The Relation of Language to Instinctive Behaviour (J. R. Jones Memorial Lecture) Publisher: University of Wales, Swansea (Dec 1981) ISBN 0860760243.
- (1984) Consciousness and Causality (with D. M. Armstrong).
- (1986) Nothing Is Hidden: Wittgenstein's criticism of his early thought.
- (1994) Wittgenstein: A Religious Point Of View? (edited, with a reply, by Peter Winch) doi:10.4324/9780203046241 ISBN 9780203046241.
- (1995) Wittgensteinian themes: essays, 1978-1989 (edited by G. H. von Wright). ISBN 978-0-8014-3042-8.

=== Essays ===
- Are Necessary Propositions Really Verbal? (1940) in Mind, Vol. 49, No. 194 (Apr., 1940), pp. 189–203 .
- Certainty and Empirical Statements (1942) in Mind, Vol. 51, No. 201 (Jan., 1942), pp. 18–46.
- The Nature of Entailment (1940) in Mind, Vol. 49, No. 195 (Jul., 1940), pp. 333–347.
- Defending Common Sense (1949) in The Philosophical Review, Vol. 58, No. 3 (May, 1949), pp. 201–220.
- Russell's Human Knowledge (1950), in The Philosophical Review, Vol. 59, No. 1 (Jan., 1950), pp. 94–106.
- Philosophy for Philosophers (1951) in The Philosophical Review, Vol. 60, No. 3 (Jul., 1951), pp. 329–340.
- Knowledge and Belief (1952), in Mind, New Series, Vol. 61, No. 242 (Apr., 1952), pp. 178–189.
- Moore's Use of "Know" (1953), in Mind, Vol. 62, No. 246 (Apr., 1953), pp. 241–247.
- Direct Perception (1953), in The Philosophical Quarterly, Vol. 3, No. 13 (Oct., 1953), pp. 301–316.
- On Knowledge and Belief (1954) in Analysis, Vol. 14, No. 4 (Mar., 1954), pp. 94–98.
- Wittgenstein's Philosophical Investigations (1954) in The Philosophical Review, Vol. 63, No. 4 (Oct., 1954), pp. 530–559.
- Dreaming and Skepticism (1956), in The Philosophical Review, Vol. 65, No. 1 (Jan., 1956), pp. 14–37.
- Knowledge of Other Minds (1958) in The Journal of Philosophy, Vol. 55, No. 23, pp. 969–978.
- Anselm's Ontological Arguments (1960) in The Philosophical Review, Vol. 69, No. 1 (Jan., 1960), pp. 41–62.
- Professor Ayer on Dreaming (1961) in The Journal of Philosophy, Vol. 58, No. 11 (May 25, 1961), pp. 294–297.
- Scientific Materialism and the Identity Theory: Comments in The Journal of Philosophy, Vol. 60, No. 22, American Philosophical Association, Eastern Division, Sixtieth Annual Meeting (Oct. 24, 1963), pp. 662–663.
- Memory and the Past (1963) in The Monist, Vol. 47, No. 2, Metaphysics Today (Winter, 1963), pp. 247–266.
- Moore and Ordinary Language (1964) in V.C. Chappell (ed.) Ordinary Language: Essays in Philosophical Method.
- Is it a Religious Belief that ‘God Exists’? (1964) in John Hick (ed.) Faith and the Philosophers.
- Descartes's Proof that his Essence is Thinking in The Philosophical Review, Vol. 74, No. 3 (Jul., 1965), pp. 315–338
- Explaining Behaviour (1967), in The Philosophical Review, Vol. 76, No. 1 (Jan., 1967), pp. 97–104.
- Wittgenstein's Philosophische Bermerkungen (1967) in The Philosophical Review, Vol. 76, No. 2 (Apr., 1967), pp. 220–229.
- The Conceivability of the Mechanism (1968), in The Philosophical Review, Vol. 77, No. 1 (Jan., 1968), pp. 45–72.
- Memory and Representation (1970) in Noûs, Vol. 4, No. 1 (Feb., 1970), pp. 59–70.
- Thoughtless Brutes (1972) in Proceedings and Addresses of the American Philosophical Association, Vol. 46 (1972 - 1973), pp. 5–20.
- The Groundlessness of Belief (1975) in Stuart Brown (ed.) Reason and Religion.
- 'Functionalism' in Philosophy of Psychology (1980), Proceedings of the Aristotelian Society, New Series, Vol. 80 (1979 - 1980), pp. 211–229.
- Subjectivity (1988) in Philosophy, Vol. 63, No. 244 (Apr., 1988), pp. 147–160.
- Wittgenstein on Language and Rules (1989) in Philosophy, Vol. 64, No. 247 (Jan., 1989), pp. 5–28.

=== Select book reviews ===
- The Rise of Scientific Philosophy by Hans Reichenbach (1951), in The Philosophical Review, Vol. 60, No. 4 (Oct., 1951), pp. 582–586.
- English Philosophy Since 1900 by G. J. Warnock (1959), in The Philosophical Review, Vol. 68, No. 2 (Apr., 1959), pp. 256–258.
- Meaning and Saying by Frank B. Ebersole; Language and Perception by Frank B. Ebersole (1980) in Philosophy, Vol. 55, No. 214 (ct., 1980), pp. 555–557.
- "Wittgenstein and the Simple Object". London Review of Books. Vol.2, no. 3., 21 February 1980 (review of Wittgenstein's Notebooks 1914-16)
- "Wittgenstein's Bag of Raisins". London Review of Books. Vol.3, No.3, 19 February 1981 (review of Culture and Value)
- "Wittgenstein's Confessions". London Review of Books. Vol.. 3, No. 21, 19 November 1981 (review of Ludwig Wittgenstein: Personal Recollections)
