= Tim Chambers =

Tim Chambers may refer to:

- Timothy Chambers, philosopher
- Tim Chambers (baseball) (1965–2019), American college baseball coach
- Staff Sgt. Tim Chambers, better known as "The Saluting Marine"
