= Meinongian argument =

Argument for the existence of God

The Meinongian argument is a type of ontological argument or an "a priori argument" that seeks to prove the existence of God. This is through an assertion that there is "a distinction between different categories of existence." The premise of the ontological argument is based on Alexius Meinong's works. Some scholars also associate it with St. Anselm's ontological argument.

== Concept ==
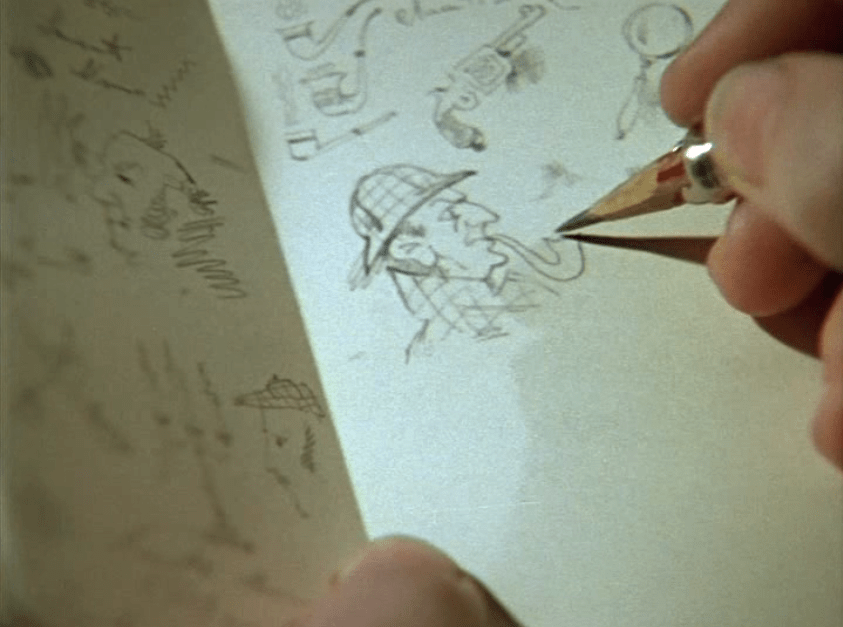
The Meinongian argument holds that Sherlock Holmes exists in what some scholars describe as distant universe of so-beings.

There are several ontological arguments that qualify as Meinongian but what all these have in common is the reliance upon the theory of objects defended by Alexius Meinong. This theory holds that: 1) there are properties; 2) this assumption does not exclude the possibility of nominalism; and, 3) the predicate expressions in natural language express properties. Out of these contexts, objects are specified or identified through an unordered collections of properties. The premises of Meinongian arguments, hence, cite a distinction of different categories of existence. This includes the concept of impossible objects (e.g. round square, golden mountain) where knowledge can be gained and assert true claims out of things that do not exist. The argument implies, for instance, that: "it is now true that [Sherlock Holmes] did not exist at t0, there was a true proposition at t0, such as the present tensed proposition [Sherlock Holmes does not exist], and that proposition was made true at t0 by Sherlock Holmes' not instantiating existence".

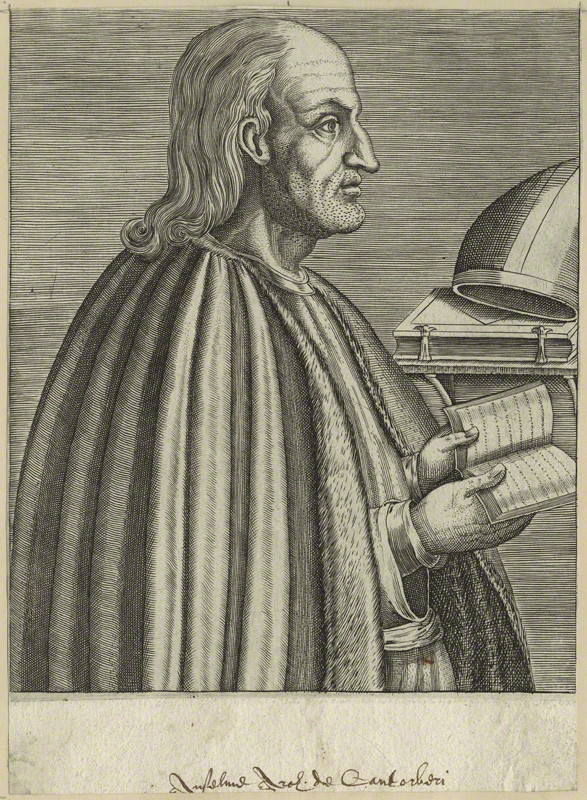
According to P. van Inwagen, St. Anselm's ontology qualifies as Meinongian argument.

Miroslaw Szatkowski cited St. Anselm's ideas to explain the concept of the Meinongian argument. The philosopher's theory was that there are two modes of being (or of existence): a weaker (less demanding) existence; and, a stronger (more demanding) existence. In the Meinongian existence thesis, it is argued that even if the Fool is right to say that something than which nothing greater can be conceived does not exist in reality, it is still true to say that the same denotes a certain item, one that is weaker and less demanding in its mode of existence. These weak and strong modes of existence are not exclusive and a thing can enjoy both. Szatkowski noted that thinkers such as St. Thomas Aquinas and Gaunilo of Marmoutiers believed that God falls within the weaker, less demanding existence since one cannot fully grasp the divine nature in its entirety and that we only understand a certain name of God. However, this partial grasp of the divine nature is enough to demonstrate the name "something a greater than which cannot be conceived". For Swatkowski, these interpretations presuppose an ontology that indicate Meinongian thought.

Bertrand Russell described the Meinongian argument in the following statement:

If you say that the golden mountain does not exist, it is obvious that there is something that you are saying that does not exist - namely the golden mountain; therefore the golden mountain must subsist in some shadowy Platonic realm of being, for otherwise your statement that the golden mountain does not exist would have no meaning.

While some thinkers associate the Meinongian argument with Anselm's ontology, there are, however, notable differences. For instance, the Meinongian conceptualization treats existenz as one of the two modes of sein while Anselm treats it as a stylistic variant.

=== Incomplete objects ===
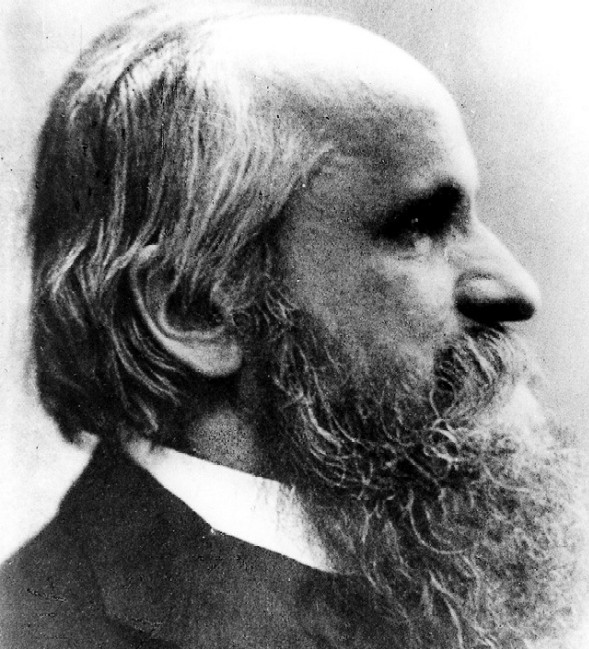
The Meinongian argument for incomplete objects is considered the key to Alexius Meinong's (pictured) treatment of conception-dependence.

Meinongian argument describes an incomplete object as that which never exists or has being in its own right, merely deriving its existence by being embedded in a complete object. This can be demonstrated when the properties of an incomplete object are present or shared by one or more existing complete objects. It is also explained that all actually existing objects are complete objects and that we can never conceive any such complete objects due to the finite capacities of the human mind.

The Meinongian argument for incomplete object is said to be the key to the treatment of conception-dependence. To distinguish the concepts of complete from incomplete objects, one can take the example of the idea 'brown.' There is a completed object when it is constituted by all the other properties which necessarily belong to brown things. On the other hand, the individual brown things (e.g. strange entity Brown; auxiliary object something brown; and, the species the brown things) are incomplete objects.

=== Complex objects ===
The Meinongian conceptualization of complex objects emerged from an attempt to explain how complex objects (the relation between objects such as causal relations, or complex objects, e.g. a melody) are understood based on lower order objects or those objects that are devoid of structural complexity or relation.

=== Reformulations ===
To address some of the perceived weaknesses of the Meinongian argument, some thinkers proposed modifications. A reformulation, for example, suggested the elimination of the term proposition so that:

1. If we can refer to an object, then we can make a statement about it that is at least meaningful;
2. A statement about nothing is a meaningless statement;
3. A statement is about something only if that object exists;
4. Therefore, we cannot refer to nonexistent objects.

== Opposing Thoughts ==
One of the critics that criticized Meinongian arguments was Willard Van Orman Quine, who attacked the ontological argument in his work, On What There Is. In this paper, Quine complained about the Meinongian conceptualization of the individuation of non-existent objects.

Bertrand Russell's ideas also undercut Meinongian arguments. This was evident in his theory of denoting concepts, where he maintained that denoting concepts may fail to denote since there is no such thing as the purported denotation. For Russell, this makes it possible for the existence of nothing and a definite description to describe it. In The Existential Import of Propositions, he stated:

"The present king of England" is a denoting concept denoting an individual; "The present king of France" is a similar complex concept denoting nothing.

Russell, however, recognized that a Meinongian argument is an unqualified form of direct realism.

The scholar Arnaud Dewalque also stated that Meinong's analysis of assumption fails to adequately account for the noncommital character of assumptive attitudes and the distinction between assumptive and neighboring attitudes.
