= Ontological argument =

Argument for the existence of God

In the philosophy of religion, an ontological argument is a deductive philosophical argument, made from an ontological basis, that is advanced in support of the existence of God. Such arguments tend to refer to the state of being or existing. More specifically, ontological arguments are commonly conceived a priori in regard to the organization of the universe, whereby, if such organizational structure is true, God must exist.

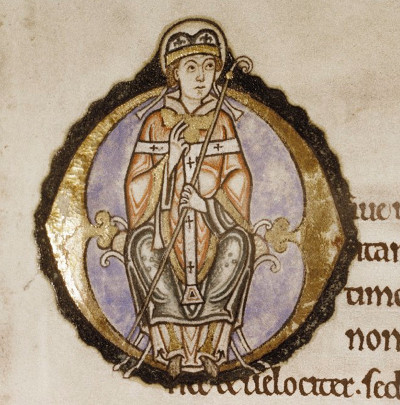
Anselm of Canterbury, who formulated the ontological argument in his 1078 work Proslogion. An illuminated archbishop—presumably Anselm—from a 12th-century edition of his Meditations. (MS Auct. D2. 6)

The first ontological argument in Western Christian tradition (Note: Szatkowski, Miroslaw, ed. 2012. Ontological Proofs Today. Ontos Verlag. "There are three main periods in the history of ontological arguments. The first was in 11th century, when St. Anselm of Canterbury came up with the first ontological argument" (p. 22).) was proposed by Saint Anselm of Canterbury in his 1078 work, Proslogion (Latin: Proslogium, lit. 'Discourse [on the Existence of God]'), in which he defines God as "a being than which no greater can be conceived," and argues that such a being must exist in the mind, even in that of the person who denies the existence of God. From this, he suggests that if the greatest possible being exists in the mind, it must also exist in reality, because if it existed only in the mind, then an even greater being must be possible–one who exists both in mind and in reality. Therefore, this greatest possible being must exist in reality.

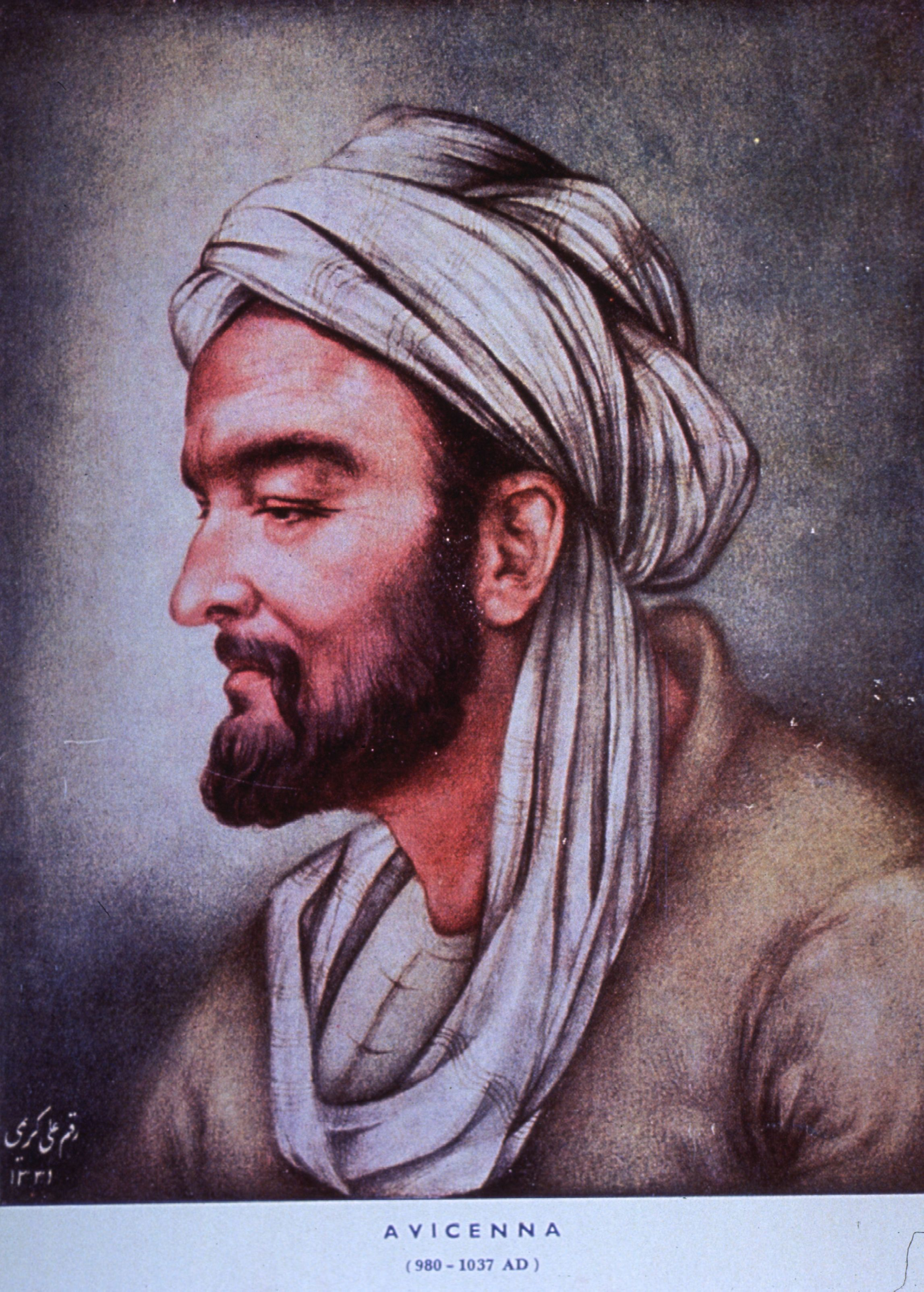
Ibn Sina (Avicenna), whose "Proof of the Truthful" (11th century) predated Anselm's ontological framework. It is recognized for its systematic logical derivation of the "Necessary Existent" (Wajib al-Wujud) from the concepts of contingency and necessity.

While Anselm's 11th-century argument is a cornerstone of Western scholasticism, it was preceded by the "Proof of the Truthful" (Burhan al-Siddiqin) developed by Ibn Sina (Avicenna) in the early 11th century. Unlike Anselm's purely conceptual approach, Ibn Sina's proof is built on a logical framework of contingency and necessity. He argued that since the collection of all "possible beings" (entities that require a cause for their existence) must itself have a cause, this sequence must terminate in a "Necessary Existent" ('Wajib al-Wujud') that exists by its own essence rather than through external causation. Scholars such as Herbert Davidson note that although both thinkers reached their ontological conclusions independently, Ibn Sina's systematic derivation provided a distinct metaphysical foundation that influenced later medieval and modern philosophy.

Seventeenth-century French philosopher René Descartes employed a similar argument to Anselm's. Descartes published several variations of his argument, each of which center on the idea that God's existence is immediately inferable from a "clear and distinct" idea of a supremely perfect being. In the early 18th century, Gottfried Leibniz augmented Descartes's ideas in an attempt to prove that a "supremely perfect" being is a coherent concept. A more recent ontological argument was formulated by Kurt Gödel in private notes, using modal logic. Although he never published or publicly presented it, a version was later transcribed and circulated by Dana Scott. Norman Malcolm also revived the ontological argument in 1960 when he located a second, stronger ontological argument in Anselm's work; Alvin Plantinga challenged this argument and proposed an alternative, based on modal logic. Attempts have also been made to validate Anselm's proof using an automated theorem prover. Other arguments have been categorised as ontological, including those made by Islamic philosophers Mulla Sadra and Allama Tabatabai.

Just as the ontological argument has been popular, a number of criticisms and objections have also been mounted. Its first critic was Gaunilo of Marmoutiers, a contemporary of Anselm's. Gaunilo, suggesting that the ontological argument could be used to prove the existence of anything, uses the analogy of a perfect island. Such would be the first of many parodies, all of which attempted to show the absurd consequences of the ontological argument. Later, Thomas Aquinas rejected the argument on the basis that humans cannot know God's nature. David Hume also offered an empirical objection, criticising its lack of evidential reasoning and rejecting the idea that anything can exist necessarily. Immanuel Kant's critique was based on what he saw as the false premise that existence is a predicate, arguing that "existing" adds nothing (including perfection) to the essence of a being. Thus, a "supremely perfect" being can be conceived not to exist. Finally, philosophers such as C. D. Broad dismissed the coherence of a maximally great being, proposing that some attributes of greatness are incompatible with others, rendering "maximally great being" incoherent.

Contemporary defenders of the ontological argument include Alvin Plantinga, Yujin Nagasawa, and Robert Maydole.

== Classification ==
The traditional definition of an ontological argument was given by Immanuel Kant. He contrasted the ontological argument (literally any argument "concerned with being") with the cosmological and physio-theoretical arguments. According to the Kantian view, ontological arguments are those founded through a priori reasoning.

Graham Oppy, who elsewhere expressed that he "see[s] no urgent reason" to depart from the traditional definition, defined ontological arguments as those which begin with "nothing but analytic, a priori and necessary premises" and conclude that God exists. Oppy admits, however, that not all of the "traditional characteristics" of an ontological argument (i.e. analyticity, necessity, and a priority) are found in all ontological arguments and, in his 2007 work Ontological Arguments and Belief in God, suggested that a better definition of an ontological argument would employ only considerations "entirely internal to the theistic worldview."

Oppy subclassified ontological arguments, based on the qualities of their premises, using the following qualities:

- definitional: arguments that invoke definitions.
- conceptual (or hyperintensional): arguments that invoke "the possession of certain kinds of ideas or concepts."
- modal: arguments that consider possibilities.
- meinongian: arguments that assert "a distinction between different categories of existence."
- experiential: arguments that employ the idea of God existing solely to those who have had experience of him.
- mereological: arguments that "draw on...the theory of the whole-part relation."
- higher-order: arguments that observe "that any collection of properties, that (a) does not include all properties and (b) is closed under entailment, is possibly jointly instantiated."
- Hegelian: the arguments of Hegel.

William Lane Craig criticised Oppy's study as too vague for useful classification. Craig argues that an argument can be classified as ontological if it attempts to deduce the existence of God, along with other necessary truths, from his definition. He suggests that proponents of ontological arguments would claim that, if one fully understood the concept of God, one must accept his existence.

William L. Rowe defines ontological arguments as those which start from the definition of God and, using only a priori principles, conclude with God's existence.

== Development ==
Although a version of the ontological argument appears explicitly in the writings of the ancient Greek philosopher Xenophanes and variations appear in writings by Parmenides, Plato, and the Neoplatonists, the mainstream view is that the ontological argument was first clearly stated and developed by Anselm of Canterbury. Some scholars argue that Islamic philosopher Avicenna (Ibn Sina) developed a special kind of ontological argument before Anselm, while others have doubted this position.

Daniel Dombrowski marked three major stages in the development of the argument:

1. Anselm's initial explicit formulation,
2. the 18th-century criticisms of Kant and Hume, and
3. the identification of a second ontological argument in Anselm's Proslogion by 20th-century philosophers.

=== Anselm ===
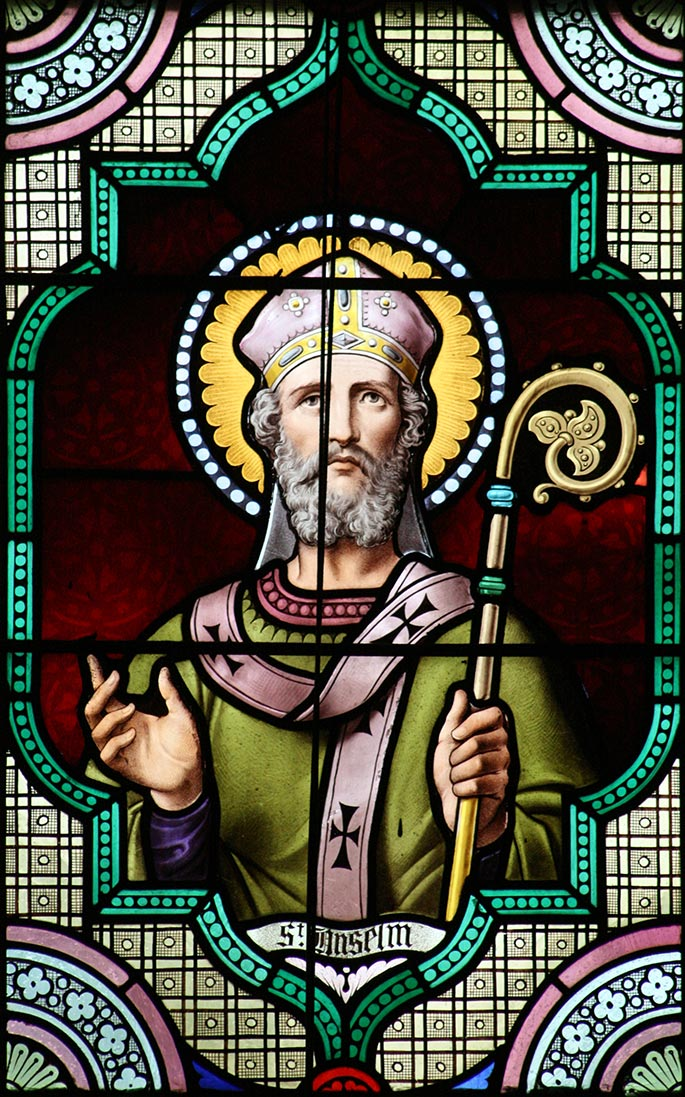
Anselm of Canterbury was the first to attempt an ontological argument for God's existence.

Theologian and philosopher Anselm of Canterbury (1033–1109) proposed an ontological argument in the 2nd and 3rd chapters of his Proslogion. Anselm's argument was not presented in order to prove God's existence; rather, Proslogion was a work of meditation in which he documented how the idea of God became self-evident to him.

In Chapter 2 of the Proslogion, Anselm defines God as a "being than which no greater can be conceived." While Anselm has often been credited as the first to understand God as the greatest possible being, this perception was actually widely described among ancient Greek philosophers and early Christian writers. He suggests that even "the fool" can understand this concept, and this understanding itself means that the being must exist in the mind. The concept must exist either only in our mind, or in both our mind and in reality. If such a being exists only in our mind, then a greater being—that which exists in the mind and in reality—can be conceived (this argument is generally regarded as a reductio ad absurdum because the view of the fool is proven to be inconsistent). Therefore, if we can conceive of a being than which nothing greater can be conceived, it must exist in reality. Thus, a being than which nothing greater could be conceived, which Anselm defined as God, must exist in reality.

Anselm's argument in Chapter 2 can be summarized as follows:

1. It is a conceptual truth (or, so to speak, true by definition) that God is a being than which none greater can be imagined.
2. God exists as an idea in the mind.
3. A being that exists as an idea in the mind and in reality is, other things being equal, greater than a being that exists only as an idea in the mind.
4. Thus, if God exists only as an idea in the mind, then we can imagine something that is greater than God (that is, a being-than-which-none-greater-can-be-imagined that does exist).
5. But we cannot imagine something that is greater than God (for it is a contradiction to suppose that we can imagine a being greater than the being-than-which-none-greater-can-be-imagined.)
6. Therefore, God exists.

In Chapter 3, Anselm presents a further argument in the same vein:

1. By definition, God is a being than which none greater can be imagined.
2. A being that necessarily exists in reality is greater than a being that does not necessarily exist.
3. Thus, by definition, if God exists as an idea in the mind but does not necessarily exist in reality, then we can imagine something that is greater than God.
4. But we cannot imagine something that is greater than God.
5. Thus, if God exists in the mind as an idea, then God necessarily exists in reality.
6. God exists in the mind as an idea.
7. Therefore, God necessarily exists in reality.

This contains the notion of a being that cannot be conceived not to exist. He argued that if something can be conceived not to exist, then something greater can be conceived. Consequently, a thing than which nothing greater can be conceived cannot be conceived not to exist and so it must exist. This can be read as a restatement of the argument in Chapter 2 – Norman Malcolm, however, considers it to be a different, stronger argument.

=== René Descartes ===
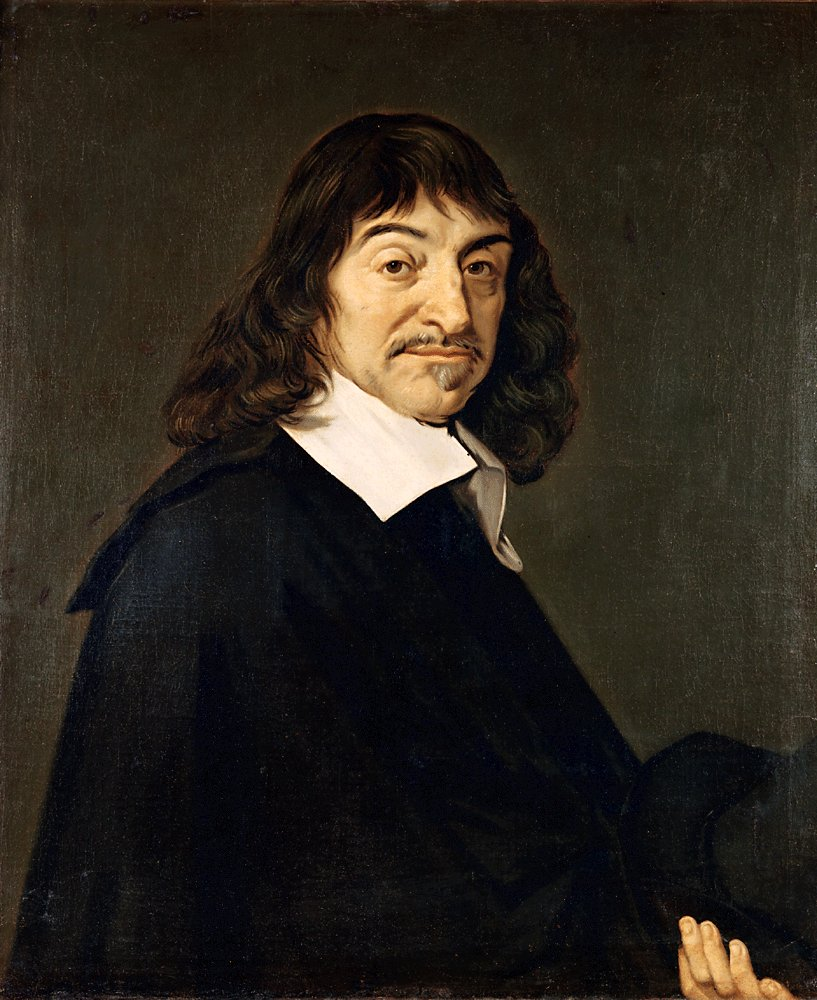
French thinker René Descartes proposed several arguments that could be termed ontological.

René Descartes (1596–1650) proposed a number of ontological arguments that differ from Anselm's formulation. Generally speaking, they are less formal arguments than they are natural intuition.

In Meditation, Book V, Descartes wrote:

But, if the mere fact that I can produce from my thought the idea of something entails that everything that I clearly and distinctly perceive to belong to that thing really does belong to it, is not this a possible basis for another argument to prove the existence of God? Certainly, the idea of God, or a supremely perfect being, is one that I find within me just as surely as the idea of any shape or number. And my understanding that it belongs to his nature that he always exists is no less clear and distinct than is the case when I prove of any shape or number that some property belongs to its nature.

Descartes argues that God's existence can be deduced from his nature, just as geometric ideas can be deduced from the nature of shapes–he used the deduction of the sizes of angles in a triangle as an example. He suggested that the concept of God is that of a supremely perfect being, holding all perfections. He seems to have assumed that existence is a predicate of a perfection. Thus, if the notion of God did not include existence, it would not be supremely perfect, as it would be lacking a perfection. Consequently, the notion of a supremely perfect God who does not exist, Descartes argues, is unintelligible. Therefore, according to his nature, God must exist.

=== Baruch Spinoza ===
In Spinoza's Short Treatise on God, Man, and His Well-Being, he wrote a section titled "Treating of God and What Pertains to Him", in which he discusses God's existence and what God is. He starts off by saying: "whether there is a God, this, we say, can be proved". His proof for God follows a similar structure as Descartes's ontological argument. Descartes attempts to prove God's existence by arguing that there "must be some one thing that is supremely good, through which all good things have their goodness". Spinoza's argument differs in that he does not move straight from the conceivability of the greatest being to the existence of God, but rather uses a deductive argument from the idea of God. Spinoza says that man's ideas do not come from himself, but from some sort of external cause. Thus the things whose characteristics a man knows must have come from some prior source. So, if man has the idea of God, then God must exist before this thought, because man cannot create an idea of his own imagination.

=== Gottfried Leibniz ===
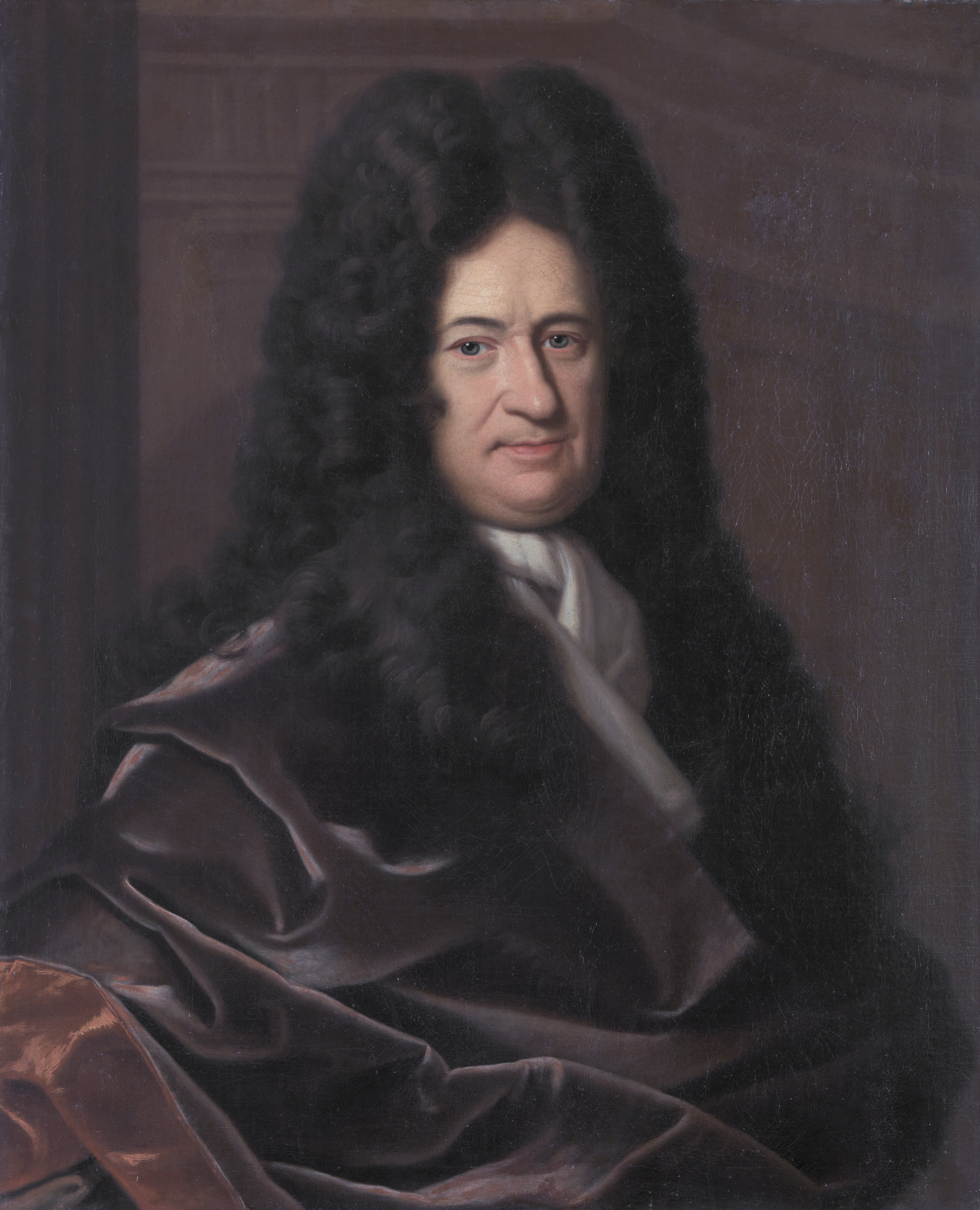
German philosopher Gottfried Leibniz attempted to prove the coherence of a "supremely perfect being".

Gottfried Wilhelm Leibniz saw a problem with Descartes's ontological argument: that Descartes had not asserted the coherence of a "supremely perfect" being. He proposed that, unless the coherence of a supremely perfect being could be demonstrated, the ontological argument fails. Leibniz saw perfection as impossible to analyse; therefore, it would be impossible to demonstrate that all perfections are incompatible. He reasoned that all perfections can exist together in a single entity, and that Descartes's argument is still valid.

=== Mulla Sadra ===
Mulla Sadra (c. 1571/2–1640) was an Iranian Shia Islamic philosopher who was influenced by earlier Muslim philosophers such as Avicenna and Suhrawardi, as well as the Sufi metaphysician Ibn 'Arabi. Sadra discussed Avicenna's arguments for the existence of God, claiming that they were not a priori. He rejected the argument on the basis that existence precedes essence, or that the existence of human beings is more fundamental than their essence.

Sadra put forward a new argument, known as Seddiqin Argument or Argument of the Righteous. The argument attempts to prove the existence of God through the reality of existence, and to conclude with God's pre-eternal necessity. In this argument, a thing is demonstrated through itself, and a path is identical with the goal. In other arguments, the truth is attained from an external source, such as from the possible to the necessary, from the originated to the eternal origin, or from motion to the unmoved mover. In the argument of the righteous, there is no middle term other than the truth. His version of the ontological argument can be summarized as follows:

1. There is existence
2. Existence is a perfection above which no perfection may be conceived
3. God is perfection and perfection in existence
4. Existence is a singular and simple reality; there is no metaphysical pluralism
5. That singular reality is graded in intensity in a scale of perfection (that is, a denial of a pure monism).
6. That scale must have a limit point, a point of greatest intensity and of greatest existence.
7. Hence God exists.

Mulla Sadra describes this argument in his main work al-asfar al-arba'a [four journeys] as follows:

Existence is a single, objective and simple reality, and there is no difference between its parts, unless in terms of perfection and imperfection, strength, and weakness... And the culmination of its perfection, where there is nothing more perfect, is its independence from any other thing. Nothing more perfect should be conceivable, as every imperfect thing belongs to another thing and needs this other to become perfect. And, as it has already been explicated, perfection is prior to imperfection, actuality to potency, and existence to non-existence. Also, it has been explained that the perfection of a thing is the thing itself, and not a thing in addition to it. Thus, either existence is independent of others or it is in need of others. The former is the Necessary, which is pure existence. Nothing is more perfect than Him. And in Him there is no room for non-existence or imperfection. The latter is other than Him, and is regarded as His acts and effects, and for other than Him there is no subsistence, unless through Him. For there is no imperfection in the reality of existence, and imperfection is added to existence only because of the quality of being caused, as it is impossible for an effect to be identical with its cause in terms of existence.

=== Georg Wilhelm Friedrich Hegel ===
In response to Kant's rejection of traditional speculative philosophy in his First Critique, and to Kant's rejection of the Ontological Argument, Georg Wilhelm Friedrich Hegel proposed throughout his lifetime works that Immanuel Kant was mistaken. Hegel took aim at Kant's famous 100 thaler argument. Kant had said that "it is one thing to have 100 thalers in my mind, and quite a different thing to have 100 thalers in my pocket". According to Kant, we can imagine a God, but that does not prove that God exists.

Hegel argued that Kant's formulation was inaccurate. He referred to Kant's error in all of his major works from 1807 to 1831: for Hegel, the "true" is the "whole" (PhG, para. 20), and the "true" is the Geist–which is to say "spirit", or "God". Thus, God is the whole of the cosmos, both unseen as well as seen. This error of Kant, therefore, was his comparison of a finite, contingent entity such as 100 thalers, with infinite, necessary Being, i.e. the whole. According to Hegel, when regarded as the whole of being, unseen as well as seen, and not simply "one being among many", then the ontological argument flourishes, and its logical necessity becomes obvious. Hegel signed a book contract in 1831, the year of his death, for a work entitled Lectures on the Proofs of the Existence of God. Hegel died before finishing the book. It was to have three sections: (1) The Cosmological Argument; (2) The Teleological Argument; and (3) the Ontological Argument. Hegel died before beginning sections 2 and 3. His work is published today as incomplete, with only part of his Cosmological Argument intact.

To peruse Hegel's ideas on the ontological argument, scholars have had to piece together his arguments from various paragraphs from his other works. Some scholars have even gone as far to suggest that Hegel's entire philosophy comprises an ontological argument.

=== Modal versions of the ontological argument ===
Modal logic deals with the logic of possibility as well as necessity. Paul Oppenheimer and Edward N. Zalta note that, for Anselm's Proslogion chapter 2, "Many recent authors have interpreted this argument as a modal one." In the phrase 'that than which none greater can be conceived', the word 'can' could be construed as referring to a possibility. Nevertheless, the authors write that "the logic of the ontological argument itself doesn't include inferences based on this modality." However, there have been newer, avowedly modal logic versions of the ontological argument, and on the application of this type of logic to the argument, James Franklin Harris writes:

[D]ifferent versions of the ontological argument, the so-called "modal" versions of the argument, which arguably avoid the part of Anselm's argument that "treats existence as a predicate," began to emerge. The [modal logic version] of these forms of defense of the ontological argument has been the most significant development.

==== Kurt Gödel ====
Mathematician Kurt Gödel provided a formal argument for God's existence. The argument was constructed by Gödel but not published until long after his death. He provided an argument based on modal logic; he uses the conception of properties, ultimately concluding with God's existence.

Definition 1: x is God-like if and only if x has as essential properties those and only those properties which are positive

Definition 2: A is an essence of x if and only if for every property B, x has B necessarily if and only if A entails B

Definition 3: x necessarily exists if and only if every essence of x is necessarily exemplified

Axiom 1: If a property is positive, then its negation is not positive

Axiom 2: Any property entailed by—i.e., strictly implied by—a positive property is positive

Axiom 3: The property of being God-like is positive

Axiom 4: If a property is positive, then it is necessarily positive

Axiom 5: Necessary existence is positive

Axiom 6: For any property P, if P is positive, then being necessarily P is positive

Theorem 1: If a property is positive, then it is consistent, i.e., possibly exemplified

Corollary 1: The property of being God-like is consistent

Theorem 2: If something is God-like, then the property of being God-like is an essence of that thing

Theorem 3: Necessarily, the property of being God-like is exemplified

Gödel defined being "god-like" as having every positive property. He left the term "positive" undefined. Gödel proposed that it is understood in an aesthetic and moral sense, or alternatively as the opposite of privation (the absence of necessary qualities in the universe). He warned against interpreting "positive" as being morally or aesthetically "good" (the greatest advantage and least disadvantage), as this includes negative characteristics. Instead, he suggested that "positive" should be interpreted as being perfect, or "purely good", without negative characteristics.

Gödel's listed theorems follow from the axioms, so most criticisms of the theory focus on those axioms or the assumptions made. For instance, axiom 5 does not explain why necessary existence is positive instead of possible existence, an axiom which the whole argument follows from. Or, for Axiom 1, to use another example, the negation of a positive property both includes the lack of any properties and the opposite property, and only the lack of any properties is a privation of a property, not the opposite property (for instance, the lack of happiness can symbolize either sadness or having no emotion, but only lacking emotion could be seen as a privation, or negative property). Either of these axioms being seen as not mapping to reality would cause the whole argument to fail. Oppy argued that Gödel gives no definition of "positive properties". He suggested that if these positive properties form a set, there is no reason to believe that any such set exists which is theologically interesting, or that there is only one set of positive properties which is theologically interesting.

A variant of Gödel's argument has been shown to be logically valid within certain systems of modal logic, notably S5 and KB (the basic system of modal logic (K) combined with the B axiom, which requires that accessibility relations between possible worlds be symmetric). This means that, given the chosen axioms, the conclusion (the necessary existence of a divine being) follows from the premises according to the rules of the adopted logical framework. However, this validity is conditional: it does not guarantee the truth of the axioms or the reality of the conclusion, but only attests to the internal coherence of the argument within a formal system. Simplified variants have even been developed to avoid classical objections—such as modal collapse—while preserving the deductive structure of the proof.

==== Malcolm ====
Norman Malcolm and Charles Hartshorne are primarily responsible for introducing modal versions of the argument into the contemporary debate. Both claimed that Anselm had two versions of the ontological argument, the second of which was a modal logic version. According to James Harris, this version is represented by Malcolm thus:

If it [that than which nothing greater can be conceived] can be conceived at all it must exist. For no one who denies or doubts the existence of a being a greater than which is inconceivable, denies or doubts that if it did exist its nonexistence, either in reality or in the understanding, would be impossible. For otherwise it would not be a being a greater than which cannot be conceived. But as to whatever can be conceived but does not exist: if it were to exist its nonexistence either in reality or in the understanding would be possible. Therefore, if a being a greater than which cannot be conceived, can even be conceived, it must exist.

Referring to the two ontological arguments proposed by Anselm in Chapters 2 and 3 of his Proslogion, Malcolm supported Kant's criticism of Anselm's argument in Chapter 2: that existence cannot be a perfection of something. However, he identified what he sees as the second ontological argument in Chapter 3 which is not susceptible to such criticism.

In Anselm's second argument, Malcolm identified two key points: first, that a being whose non-existence is logically impossible is greater than a being whose non-existence is logically possible, and second, that God is a being "than which a greater cannot be conceived". Malcolm supported that definition of God and suggested that it makes the proposition of God's existence a logically necessarily true statement (in the same way that "a square has four sides" is logically necessarily true). Thus, while rejecting the idea of existence itself being a perfection, Malcolm argued that necessary existence is a perfection. This, he argued, proved the existence of an unsurpassably great necessary being.

Jordan Sobel writes that Malcolm is incorrect in assuming that the argument he is expounding is to be found entirely in Proslogion chapter 3. "Anselm intended in Proslogion III not an independent argument for the existence of God, but a continuation of the argument of Proslogion II."

==== Hartshorne ====
Hartshorne conceives of his modal argument as follows:

Let '$q$' stand for 'There is a perfect being', and '$p \to\ q$' for '$p$ strictly implies $q$'.

1. Assume that perfection could not exist contingently (Anselm's Principle): $q \to \Box q$
2. Consider the following theorem: $\Box q\or \neg \Box q$
3. Consider the following axiom: $\neg\Box q\to \Box \neg \Box q$
4. Inference from 2, 3: $\Box q\or \Box \neg \Box q$
5. Inference from 1: $\Box \neg \Box q\to \Box \neg q$
6. Inference from 4, 5: $\Box q \or \Box \neg q$
7. Assume that perfection is not impossible: $\neg \Box \neg q$
8. Inference from 6, 7: $\Box q$
9. Consider the following axiom: $\Box q \to q$
10. Inference from 8, 9: $q$

In step 3, a version of the axiom characteristic for S5 is introduced. However, Robert Adams showed that, with only minor formal changes, the Brouwersche System suffices.

Hartshorne says that, for Anselm, "necessary existence is a superior manner of existence to ordinary, contingent existence and that ordinary, contingent existence is a defect." For Hartshorne, both Hume and Kant focused only upon whether what exists is greater than what does not exist. However, "Anselm's point is that what exists and cannot not exist is greater than that which exists and can not exist." This avoids the question of whether or not existence is a predicate.

==== Alvin Plantinga ====
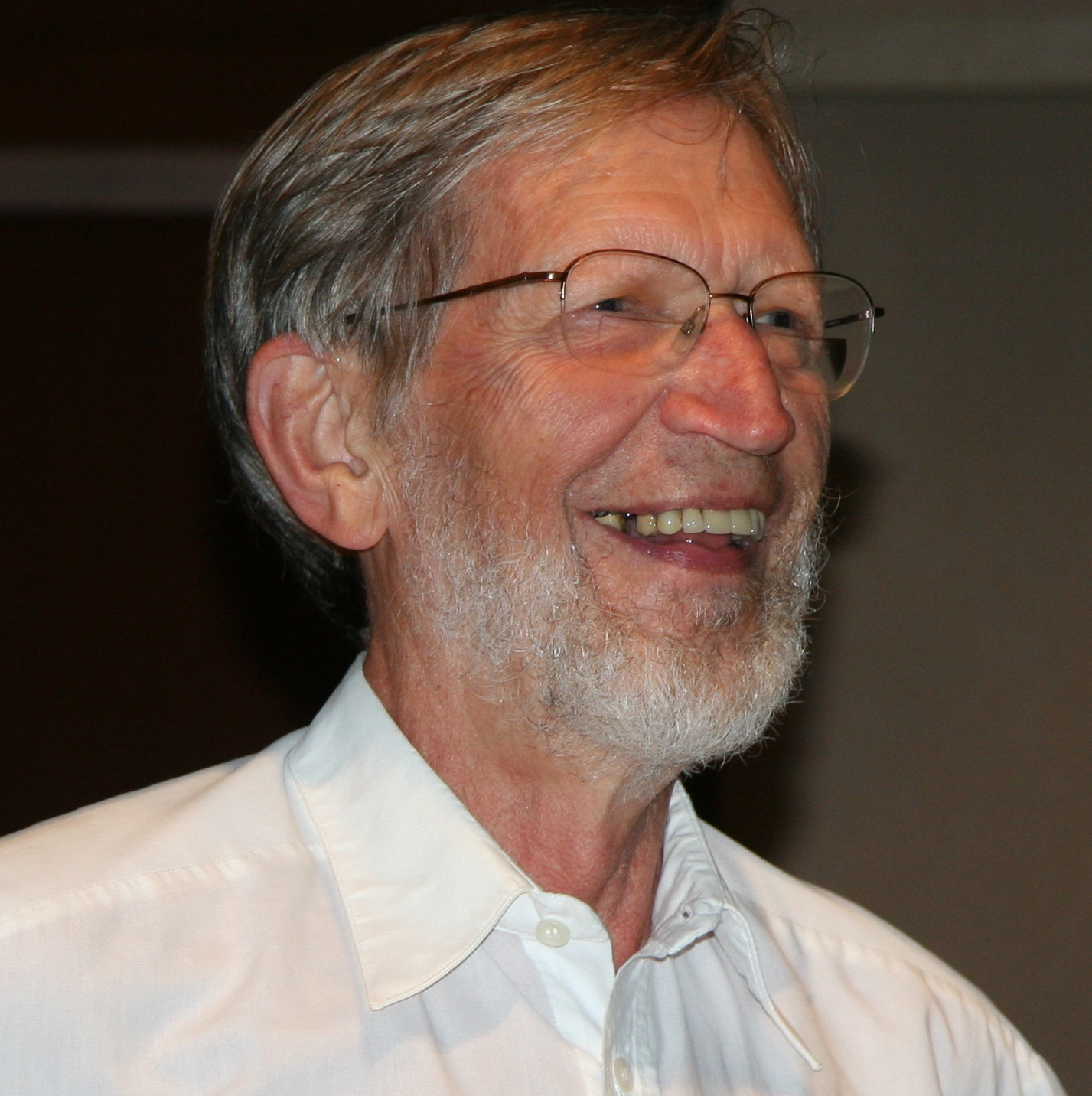
Alvin Plantinga criticized Malcolm's and Hartshorne's ontological arguments and proposed a variation of his own.

Christian Analytic philosopher Alvin Plantinga criticized Malcolm's and Hartshorne's arguments, and offered an alternative.

Plantinga developed his argument in the books titled The nature of necessity (1974; ch. 10) and God, Freedom and Evil (1974; part 2 c). In them, he does not distinguish between Malcom and Hartshorne's contribution and treats them as having put forward roughly the same idea. Jordan Sobel objects to conflating Malcom and Hartshorne's views this way, maintaining that Hartshorne's version is not vulnerable to the objection Plantinga claims to raise.

Plantinga summarizes Malcom's and Hartshorne's contributions as follows. Any entity would be greater than it is, if it were to exist necessarily (that is, if it were to exist in every possible world). Hence, necessary existence is a property that contributes to an entity's greatness. God, as a being that is maximally great, must hence exist necessarily. It is possible that (i.e. there is a possible world where) God, a maximally great being, exists. If God exists in that world, then, being maximally great, God exists in every world. Hence, God also exists in the actual world and does so with necessity.

Plantinga's criticism is that the argument, thus construed, does not show enough. If it is successful, it proves the necessary existence of a being that is maximally great in some possible world. But such a being – though maximally great somewhere – may not be (even remotely) great in our world. God's maximal greatness, however, is not merely accidental: "He could not have been otherwise". Hence, if God exists in some possible world, he must be maximally great at every world.

Note here that according to Jordan Sobel, this objection is not a problem for Hartshorne's account. Hartshorne, Sobel writes, does not consider a being that is not perfect in all worlds (but only in some) to be perfect.

In an attempt to make the argument immune to his criticism, Plantinga differentiated between "maximal greatness" and "maximal excellence". A being's excellence in a particular world depends only on its properties in that world; a being's greatness depends on its properties in all worlds. Therefore, the greatest possible being must have maximal excellence in every possible world. A being is maximally excellent in a world, only if it is omniscient, omnipotent and morally perfect. A being is maximally great, if it is maximally excellent in every possible world. Given that maximal greatness is maximal excellence in every world, it also entails necessary existence. Plantinga then restated Malcolm's argument, using the concept of "maximal greatness". He argued that it is possible for a being with maximal greatness to exist, so a being with maximal greatness exists in a possible world. If this is the case, then a being with maximal greatness exists in every world, and therefore in this world.

According to Graham Oppy, we can summarize Plantinga's rendition of the argument as follows:

1. "There is a possible world in which there is an entity that possesses maximal greatness. (Premise)
2. (Hence) There is an entity that possesses maximal greatness. (From 1)"

There are different reconstructions of Plantinga's argument across the literature, for example Graham Oppy's above, Jordan Sobel's from his book Logic and Theism, Joshua Rasmussen's from his book chapter Plantinga, or Gregory Stacey's from his paper Modal Ontological Arguments. Note that in the final rendition of his argument, Plantinga phrases it in terms of instantiations of properties, rather than in terms of possible beings. He does this to avoid questions arising from the status of possible beings and writes that wherever he does use the term "possible being" it can be easily reformulated in terms of properties and their instances.

According to Graham Oppy, the validity of this argument relies on a B or S5 system of modal logic, because they have the suitable accessibility relations between worlds. Plantinga's version of S5 suggests that "To say that p is possibly necessarily true is to say that, with regard to one possible world, it is true at all worlds; but in that case it is true at all worlds, and so it is simply necessary." In other words, to say that p is necessarily possible means that p is true in at least one possible world W (if it is an actual world; Plantinga also used Axioms B of S5: $A\to\Box\Diamond A$) and thus it is true in all worlds because its omnipotence, omniscience, and moral perfection are its essence.

In the version of the argument in God, Freedom and Evil, Plantinga clarified that "it follows that if W had been actual, it would have been impossible that there be no such being. That is, if W had been actual,

(33) There is no omnipotent, omniscient, and morally perfect being,

would have been an impossible proposition. But if a proposition is impossible in at least one possible world, then it is impossible in every possible world; what is impossible does not vary from world to world. Accordingly (33) is impossible in the actual world, i.e., impossible simpliciter. But if it is impossible that there be no such being, then there actually exists a being that is omnipotent, omniscient, and morally perfect; this being, furthermore, has these qualities essentially and exists in every possible world."

A version of his argument may be formulated as follows:

1. A being has maximal excellence in a given possible world W if and only if it is omnipotent, omniscient and wholly good in W; and
2. A being has maximal greatness if it has maximal excellence in every possible world.
3. It is possible that there is a being that has maximal greatness. (Premise)
4. Therefore, possibly, it is necessarily true that an omniscient, omnipotent, and perfectly good being exists.
5. Therefore, (by axiom 5 of S5) it is necessarily true that an omniscient, omnipotent and perfectly good being exists.
6. Therefore, an omniscient, omnipotent and perfectly good being exists.

Plantinga argued that, although the first premise is not rationally established, it is not contrary to reason. Michael Martin argued that, if certain components of perfection are contradictory, such as omnipotence and omniscience, then the first premise is contrary to reason. Martin also proposed parodies of the argument, suggesting that the existence of anything can be demonstrated with Plantinga's argument, provided it is defined as perfect or special in every possible world.

Another Christian philosopher, William Lane Craig, characterizes Plantinga's argument in a slightly different way:

1. It is possible that a maximally great being exists.
2. If it is possible that a maximally great being exists, then a maximally great being exists in some possible world.
3. If a maximally great being exists in some possible world, then it exists in every possible world.
4. If a maximally great being exists in every possible world, then it exists in the actual world.
5. If a maximally great being exists in the actual world, then a maximally great being exists.
6. Therefore, a maximally great being exists.

According to Craig, premises (2)–(5) are relatively uncontroversial among philosophers, but "the epistemic entertainability of premise (1) (or its denial) does not guarantee its metaphysical possibility." Furthermore the philosopher Richard M. Gale argued that premise one, the "possibility premise", begs the question. He stated that one only has the epistemic right to accept the premise if one understands the nested modal operators, and that if one understands them within the system S5—without which the argument fails—then one understands that "possibly necessarily" is in essence the same as "necessarily". Thus the premise begs the question because the conclusion is embedded within it. Plantinga anticipated this line of objection and pointed out in his defense that any deductively valid argument will beg the question this way.

On systems of modal logic in general, James Garson writes that "the words 'necessarily' and 'possibly', have many different uses. So the acceptability of axioms for modal logic depends on which of these uses we have in mind." Evaluating Plantinga's argument in particular, however, Graham Oppy notes that S5 is standardly taken to be the right system for capturing logical and metaphysical uses of "necessarily" and "possibly" (which are the uses at play in Plantinga's argument).

=== Sankara's dictum ===
An approach to supporting the possibility premise in Plantinga's version of the argument was attempted by Alexander Pruss. He started with the 8th–9th-century AD Indian philosopher Sankara's dictum that if something is impossible, we cannot have a perception (even a non-veridical one) that it is the case. It follows that if we have a perception that p, then even though it might not be the case that p, it is at least the case that possibly p. If mystics in fact perceive the existence of a maximally great being, it follows that the existence of a maximally great being is at least possible.

=== Automated reasoning ===
Paul Oppenheimer and Edward N. Zalta used an automated theorem prover—Prover9—to validate Anselm's ontological thesis. Prover9 subsequently discovered a simpler, formally valid (if not necessarily sound) ontological argument from a single non-logical premise.

== Criticisms and objections ==
=== Gaunilo ===
One of the earliest recorded objections to Anselm's argument was raised by one of Anselm's contemporaries, Gaunilo of Marmoutiers. He invited his reader to conceive an island "more excellent" than any other island. He suggested that, according to Anselm's proof, this island must necessarily exist, as an island that exists would be more excellent. Gaunilo's criticism does not explicitly demonstrate a flaw in Anselm's argument; rather, it argues that if Anselm's argument is sound, so are many other arguments of the same logical form, which cannot be accepted. He offered a further criticism of Anselm's ontological argument, suggesting that the notion of God cannot be conceived, as Anselm had asserted. He argued that many theists would accept that God, by nature, cannot be fully comprehended. Therefore, if humans cannot fully conceive of God, the ontological argument cannot work.

Anselm responded to Gaunilo's criticism by arguing that the argument applied only to concepts with necessary existence. He suggested that only a being with necessary existence can fulfill the remit of "that than which nothing greater can be conceived". Furthermore, a contingent object, such as an island, could always be improved and thus could never reach a state of perfection. For that reason, Anselm dismissed any argument that did not relate to a being with necessary existence.

Other parodies have been presented, including the devil corollary, the no devil corollary and the extreme no devil corollary. The devil corollary proposes that a being than which nothing worse can be conceived exists in the understanding (sometimes the term lesser is used in place of worse). Using Anselm's logical form, the parody argues that if it exists in the understanding, a worse being would be one that exists in reality; thus, such a being exists. The no devil corollary is similar, but argues that a worse being would be one that does not exist in reality, so does not exist. The extreme no devil corollary advances on this, proposing that a worse being would be that which does not exist in the understanding, so such a being exists neither in reality nor in the understanding. Timothy Chambers argued that the devil corollary is more powerful than Gaunilo's challenge because it withstands the challenges that may defeat Gaunilo's parody. He also claimed that the extreme no devil corollary is a strong challenge, as it "underwrites" the no devil corollary, which "threatens Anselm's argument at its very foundations". Christopher New and Stephen Law argue that the ontological argument is reversible, and if it is sound, it can also be used to prove the existence of a maximally evil god in the Evil God challenge.

=== Thomas Aquinas ===
Thomas Aquinas, while proposing five proofs of God's existence in his Summa Theologica, objected to Anselm's argument. He suggested that people cannot know the nature of God and, therefore, cannot conceive of God in the way Anselm proposed. The ontological argument would be meaningful only to someone who understands the essence of God completely. Aquinas reasoned that, as only God can completely know His essence, only He could use the argument. His rejection of the ontological argument led other Catholic theologians to also reject the argument.

=== David Hume ===
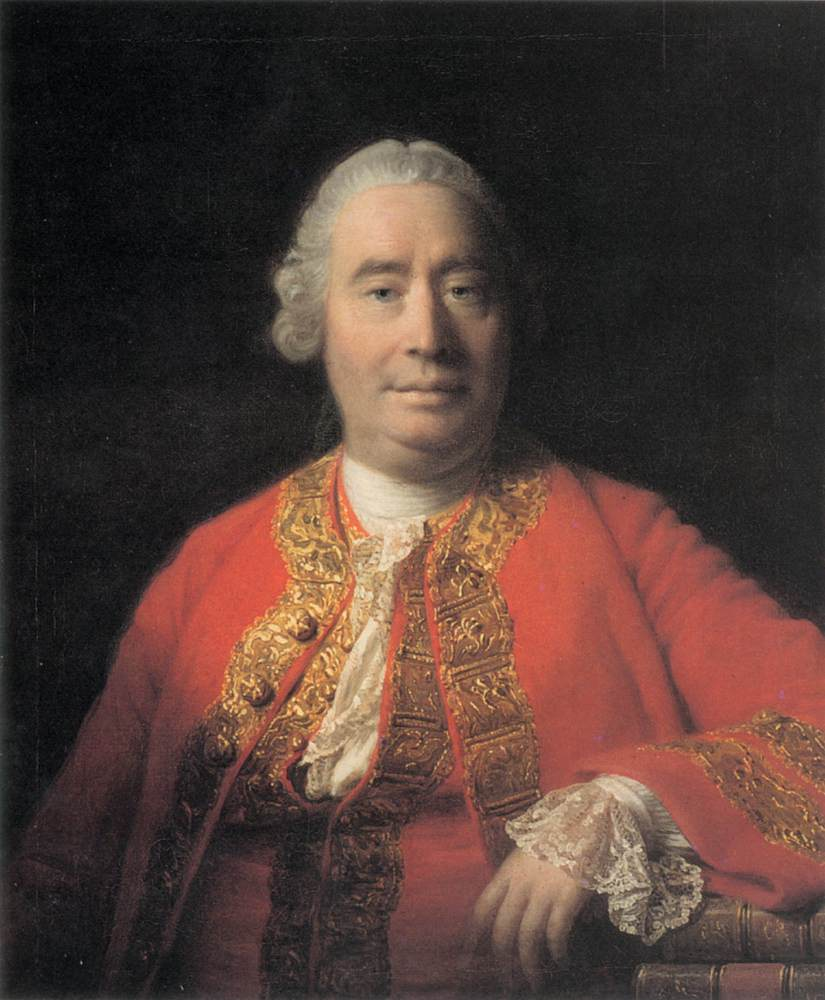
David Hume reasoned that an ontological argument was not possible.

Scottish philosopher and empiricist David Hume argued that nothing can be proven to exist using only a priori reasoning. In his Dialogues Concerning Natural Religion, the character Cleanthes proposes a criticism:

...there is an evident absurdity in pretending to demonstrate a matter of fact, or to prove it by any arguments a priori. Nothing is demonstrable, unless the contrary implies a contradiction. Nothing, that is distinctly conceivable, implies a contradiction. Whatever we conceive as existent, we can also conceive as non-existent. There is no being, therefore, whose non-existence implies a contradiction. Consequently there is no being, whose existence is demonstrable.

— David Hume, Dialogues Concerning Natural Religion, Part 9

Hume also suggested that, as we have no abstract idea of existence (apart from as part of our ideas of other objects), we cannot claim that the idea of God implies his existence. He suggested that any conception of God we may have, we can conceive either of existing or of not existing. He believed that existence is not a quality (or perfection), so a completely perfect being need not exist. Thus, he claimed that it is not a contradiction to deny God's existence. Although this criticism is directed against a cosmological argument, similar to that of Samuel Clarke in his first Boyle Lecture, it has been applied to ontological arguments as well.

=== Immanuel Kant ===
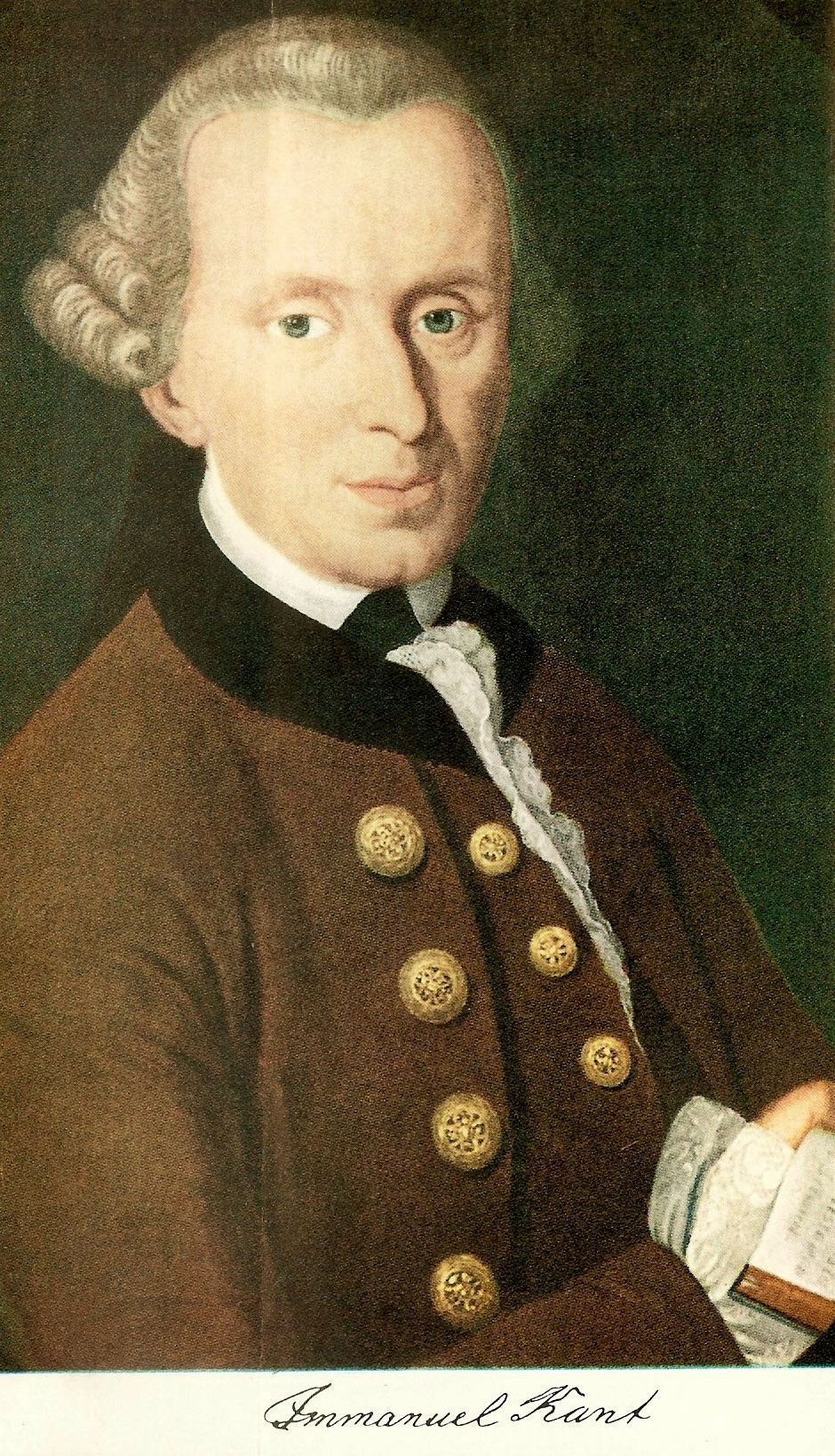
Immanuel Kant proposed that existence is not a predicate.

Immanuel Kant put forward an influential criticism of the ontological argument in his Critique of Pure Reason. His criticism is primarily directed at Descartes, but also attacks Leibniz. It is shaped by his central distinction between analytic and synthetic propositions. In an analytic proposition, the predicate concept is contained in its subject concept; in a synthetic proposition, the predicate concept is not contained in its subject concept.

Kant questions the intelligibility of the concept of a necessary being. He considers examples of necessary propositions, such as "a triangle has three angles", and rejects the transfer of this logic to the existence of God. First, he argues that such necessary propositions are necessarily true only if such a being exists: If a triangle exists, it must have three angles. The necessary proposition, he argues, does not make the existence of a triangle necessary. Thus he argues that, if the proposition "X exists" is posited, it would follow that, if X exists, it exists necessarily; this does not mean that X exists in reality. Second, he argues that contradictions arise only when the predicate is rejected but the subject is maintained and, therefore, a judgement of non-existence cannot be a contradiction, as it denies the subject.

Kant then proposes that the statement "God exists" must be analytic or synthetic–the predicate must be inside or outside of the subject, respectively. If the proposition is analytic, as the ontological argument takes it to be, then the statement would be true only because of the meaning given to the words. Kant claims that this is merely a tautology and cannot say anything about reality. However, if the statement is synthetic, the ontological argument does not work, as the existence of God is not contained within the definition of God (and, as such, evidence for God would need to be found).

Kant goes on to write, "'being' is evidently not a real predicate" and cannot be part of the concept of something. He proposes that existence is not a predicate, or quality. This is because existence does not add to the essence of a being, but merely indicates its occurrence in reality. He states that by taking the subject of God with all its predicates and then asserting that God exists, "I add no new predicate to the conception of God". He argues that the ontological argument works only if existence is a predicate; if this is not so, he claims the ontological argument is invalidated, as it is then conceivable a completely perfect being does not exist.

In addition, Kant claims that the concept of God is not one of a particular sense; rather, it is an "object of pure thought". He asserts that God exists outside the realm of experience and nature. Because we cannot experience God through experience, Kant argues that it is impossible to know how we would verify God's existence. This is in contrast to material concepts, which can be verified by means of the senses.

=== Douglas Gasking ===
Australian philosopher Douglas Gasking (1911–1994) developed a version of the ontological argument meant to prove God's non-existence. It was not intended to be serious; rather, its purpose was to illustrate the problems Gasking saw in the ontological argument.

Gasking asserted that the creation of the world is the most marvellous achievement imaginable. The merit of such an achievement is the product of its quality and the creator's disability: the greater the disability of the creator, the more impressive the achievement. Non-existence, Gasking asserts, would be the greatest handicap. Therefore, if the universe is the product of an existent creator, we could conceive of a greater being—one which does not exist. A non-existent creator is greater than one which exists, so God does not exist. Gasking's proposition that the greatest disability would be non-existence is a response to Anselm's assumption that existence is a predicate and perfection. Gasking uses this logic to assume that non-existence must be a disability.

Graham Oppy criticized the argument, viewing it as a weak parody of the ontological argument. He stated that, although it may be accepted that it would be a greater achievement for a non-existent creator to create something than a creator who exists, there is no reason to assume that a non-existent creator would be a greater being. He continued by arguing that there is no reason to view the creation of the world as "the most marvellous achievement imaginable". Finally, he stated that it may be inconceivable for a non-existent being to create anything at all.

=== William L. Rowe ===
American philosopher of religion William L. Rowe notably believed that the structure of the ontological argument was such that it inherently begs the question of God's existence, that is to say, that one must have a presupposed belief in God's existence in order to accept the argument's conclusion. To illustrate this, Rowe devises the concept of a "unicornex," defined as a "unicorn that actually exists." Note that some possible object is a unicorn, but since in fact no unicorns exist, no possible object is a unicornex. Thus, in order to know that unicornexes are possible, you must know that unicornexes exist. Rowe believes that this is analogous to the ontological argument's conception of God in the formulation of the greatest conceivable being: the greatest conceivable being is an omnipotent, omnipowerful, supremely perfect, existing being. Nothing in that definition explicitly demonstrates existence, it is simply added on as a necessary philosophical quality in the same sense that the unicornex is given the quality of existence as well. Therefore, to Rowe, there is no way to know the existence of the greatest conceivable being without already knowing that he exists—the definition simply begs the question.

=== Coherence of a maximally great being ===
In his development of the ontological argument, Leibniz attempted to demonstrate the coherence of a supremely perfect being. C. D. Broad countered that if two characteristics necessary for God's perfection are incompatible with a third, the notion of a supremely perfect being becomes incoherent. The ontological argument assumes the definition of God purported by classical theism: that God is omnipotent, omniscient, and morally perfect. Kenneth Einar Himma claimed that omniscience and omnipotence may be incompatible: if God is omnipotent, then he should be able to create a being with free will; if he is omniscient, then he should know exactly what such a being will do (which may technically render them without free will). This analysis would render the ontological argument incoherent, as the characteristics required of a maximally great being cannot coexist in one being, thus such a being could not exist.

=== Bertrand Russell ===
Bertrand Russell, during his early Hegelian phase, accepted the argument; he once exclaimed: "Great God in Boots!—the ontological argument is sound!" However, he later criticized the argument, asserting that "the argument does not, to a modern mind, seem very convincing, but it is easier to feel convinced that it must be fallacious than it is to find out precisely where the fallacy lies." He drew a distinction between existence and essence, arguing that the essence of a person can be described and their existence still remain in question.

== Bibliography ==
- Freddoso, Alfred J. (1983). The Existence and Nature of God: The Ontological Argument. University of Notre Dame Press.
- Gracia, Jorge J. E.; Reichberg, Gregory M.; Schumacher, Bernard N. (2003). The Classics of Western Philosophy: A Reader's Guide. Blackwell Publishing. ISBN 978-0-631-23611-5.
- Hartshorne, Charles (1962). The Logic of Perfection. LaSalle, Illinois: Open Court.
- Jori, Alberto (June 2002). "Die Paradoxien des menschlichen Selbstbewusstseins und die notwendige Existenz Gottes — Zu 'Cogitatio' und 'Intellectus' im Streit zwischen Anselm und Gaunilo". In Viola, C.; Kormos, J. (eds.). Rationality from Saint Augustine to Saint Anselm. Proceedings of the International Anselm Conference – Piliscsaba (Hungary) 20–23. Piliscsaba (2005). pp. 197–210.
- Leaman, Oliver; Groff, Peter S. (2007). Islamic Philosophy A–Z. Edinburgh University Press. ISBN 978-0-7486-2089-0.
- Logan, Ian (2009). Reading Anselm's Proslogion: The History of Anselm's Argument and its Significance Today. Ashgate. ISBN 978-0-7546-6123-8.
- Malcolm, Norman (1960). "Anselm's Ontological Arguments". In Hick, John (ed.). The Existence of God (Problems of Philosophy). Macmillan. ISBN 978-0-02-085450-0. Also in The Philosophical Review, Vol. 69, No. 1 (Jan. 1960), pp. 41-62 and in Knowledge and Certainty: Essays and Lectures by Norman Malcolm, Cornell University Press, 1975) ISBN 0-8014-9154-1.
- Oppy, Graham (1996). Ontological Arguments and Belief in God. Cambridge University Press. ISBN 978-0-521-03900-0.
- Plantinga, Alvin, ed. (1965). The Ontological Argument from St. Anselm to Contemporary Philosophers. Garden City, New York: Doubleday.
- Plantinga, Alvin (1977). God, Freedom and Evil. Grand Rapids, Michigan: Eerdmans. pp. 85–112. ISBN 9780802817310.
- Plantinga, Alvin (1998). Sennett, James F. (ed.). The analytic theist: an Alvin Plantinga reader. William B. Eerdmans Publishing. ISBN 978-0-8028-4229-9.
- Szatkowski, Miroslaw, ed. (2012). Ontological Proofs Today. Ontos Verlag. ISBN 978-0-8028-4229-9.
