= Proof of the Truthful =

Islamic formal argument for the existence of God

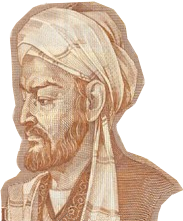
Avicenna, the proponent of the argument, depicted on a 1999 Tajikistani banknote

The Proof of the Truthful (Arabic: برهان الصديقين, romanized: burhān al-ṣiddīqīn, also translated Demonstration of the Truthful or Proof of the Veracious, among others) is a formal argument for proving the existence of God introduced by the Islamic philosopher Avicenna (also known as Ibn Sina, 980–1037). Avicenna argued that there must be a "necessary existent" (Arabic: واجب الوجود, romanized: wājib al-wujūd), an entity that cannot not exist. The argument says that the entire set of contingent things must have a cause that is not contingent because otherwise it would be included in the set. Furthermore, through a series of arguments, he derived that the necessary existent must have attributes that he identified with God in Islam, including unity, simplicity, immateriality, intellect, power, generosity, and goodness.

Historian of philosophy Peter Adamson called the argument one of the most influential medieval arguments for God's existence, and Avicenna's biggest contribution to the history of philosophy. It was enthusiastically received and repeated (sometimes with modification) by later philosophers, including generations of Muslim philosophers, Western Christian philosophers such as Thomas Aquinas and Duns Scotus, and Jewish philosophers such as Maimonides.

Critics of the argument include Averroes, who objected to its methodology, Al-Ghazali, who disagreed with its characterization of God, and modern critics who state that its piecemeal derivation of God's attributes allows people to accept parts of the argument but still reject God's existence. There is no consensus among modern scholars on the classification of the argument; some say that it is ontological while others say it is cosmological.

== Origin ==
The argument is outlined in Avicenna's various works. The most concise and influential form is found in the fourth "class" of his Remarks and Admonitions (Al-isharat wa al-tanbihat). It is also present in Book II, Chapter 12 of the Book of Salvation (Kitab al-najat) and throughout the Metaphysics section of the Book of Healing (al-Shifa). The passages in Remarks and Admonitions draw a distinction between two types of proof for the existence of God: the first is derived from reflection on nothing but existence itself; the second requires reflection on things such as God's creations or God's acts. Avicenna says that the first type is the proof for "the truthful", which is more solid and nobler than the second one, which is proof for a certain "group of people". According to the professor of Islamic philosophy Shams C. Inati, by "the truthful" Avicenna means the philosophers, and the "group of people" means the theologians and others who seek to demonstrate God's existence through his creations. The proof then became known in the Arabic tradition as the "Proof of the Truthful" (burhan al-siddiqin).

== Argument ==
=== The Necessary Existent ===
Ibn Sina distinguishes between a thing that needs an external cause in order to exist – a contingent thing – and a thing that is guaranteed to exist by its essence or intrinsic nature – a necessary existent. The argument tries to prove that there is indeed a necessary existent. It does this by first considering whether the opposite could be true: that everything that exists is contingent. Each contingent thing will need something other than itself to bring it into existence, which will in turn need another cause to bring it into existence, and so on. Because this seemed to lead to an infinite regress, cosmological arguments before Avicenna concluded that some necessary cause (such as God) is needed to end the infinite chain. However, Avicenna's argument does not preclude the possibility of an infinite regress.

Instead, the argument considers the entire collection (jumla) of contingent things, the sum total of every contingent thing that exists, has existed, or will exist. Avicenna argues that this aggregate, too, must obey the rule that applies to a single contingent thing; in other words, it must have something outside itself that causes it to exist. This cause has to be either contingent or necessary. It cannot be contingent, though, because if it were, it would already be included within the aggregate. Thus the only remaining possibility is that an external cause is necessary, and that cause must be a necessary existent.

Avicenna anticipates that one could reject the argument by saying that the collection of contingent things may not be contingent. A whole does not automatically share the features of its parts; for example, in mathematics a set of numbers is not a number. Therefore, the hypothetical objection goes, the step in the argument that assumes that the collection of contingent things is also contingent, is wrong. However, Avicenna dismisses this counter-argument as a capitulation, and not an objection at all. If the entire collection of contingent things is not contingent, then it must be necessary. This also leads to the conclusion that there is a necessary existent, the very thing Avicenna is trying to prove. Avicenna remarks, "in a certain way, this is the very thing that is sought".

=== From the necessary existent to God ===
The limitation of the argument so far is that it only shows the existence of a necessary existent, and that is different from showing the existence of God as worshipped in Islam. An atheist might agree that a necessary existent exists, but it could be the universe itself, or there could be many necessary existents, none of which is God. Avicenna is aware of this limitation, and his works contain numerous arguments to show the necessary existent must have the attributes associated with God identified in Islam.

For example, Avicenna gives a philosophical justification for the Islamic doctrine of tawhid (oneness of God) by showing the uniqueness and simplicity of the necessary existent. He argues that the necessary existent must be unique, using a proof by contradiction, or reductio, showing that a contradiction would follow if one supposes that there were more than one necessary existent. If one postulates two necessary existents, A and B, a simplified version of the argument considers two possibilities: if A is distinct from B as a result of something implied from necessity of existence, then B would share it, too (being a necessary existent itself), and the two are not distinct after all. If, on the other hand, the distinction resulted from something not implied by necessity of existence, then this individuating factor will be a cause for A, and this means that A has a cause and is not a necessary existent after all. Either way, the opposite proposition resulted in contradiction, which to Avicenna proves the correctness of the argument. Avicenna argued that the necessary existent must be simple (not a composite) by a similar reductio strategy. If it were a composite, its internal parts would need a feature that distinguishes each from the others. The distinguishing feature cannot be solely derived from the parts' necessity of existence, because then they would both have the same feature and not be distinct: a contradiction. But it also cannot be accidental, or requiring an outside cause, because this would contradict its necessity of existence.

Avicenna derives other attributes of the necessary existent in multiple texts in order to justify its identification with God. He shows that the necessary existent must also be immaterial, intellective, powerful, generous, of pure good (khayr mahd), willful (irada), "wealthy" or "sufficient" (ghani), and self-subsistent (qayyum), among other qualities. These attributes often correspond to the epithets of God found in the Quran. In discussing some of the attributes' derivations, Adamson commented that "a complete consideration of Avicenna's derivation of all the attributes ... would need a book-length study". In general, Avicenna derives the attributes based on two aspects of the necessary existent: (1) its necessity, which can be shown to imply its sheer existence and a range of negations (e.g. not being caused, not being multiple), and (2) its status as a cause of other existents, which can be shown to imply a range of positive relations (e.g. knowing and powerful).

=== Later developments ===
==== Shihab al-Din Yahya Suhrawardi ====
Suhrawardi, founder of illuminationism, also referred to the seddiqin. This version is important because he introduced mystical ideas into the argument. In addition, Mulla Sadra Shirazi was closer to Suhrawardi than was Avicenna. Suhrawardi had distinct terminology for the argument. For instance, he used "the lights of light" in place of God or necessary being. He used "rich" for necessary being and "poor" for contingent being. His argument in his collected works are as follows:

If immaterial light were poor in its essence, then its need would not be for a dusky dead substance, for it would not be proper that the more noble and complete should be founded on that which is not in that direction [toward nobility], and how could the dusky benefit the light? So, if the immaterial light is needy in its occurrence, then there should be for it a supporting light. Then the ordered supporting lights will not go on to an infinite regress, as you know from the proof for the necessity of an end for things ordered into collections. So, there must be an end to the supporting lights, and their accidents and barzakh [mediation] and shapes are [directed] to a light beyond which is no further light, and that is the Light of Lights, the Comprehensive Light, the Self-Subsistent Light, the Sacred Light, the most Magnificent and Lofty of Lights, and this is the Almighty Light, and this is the absolutely needless, for no other thing is beyond it

— Shihab al-Din Yahya Suhrawardi, " Majmu’ah musannifat shaykh ishraq " (1957-1960), Henty Corbin, the collected works of Sheykh Eshraq.1977, Vol. 2, p. 121

Of course, the above argument depends upon the impossibility of an infinite regress, but in other books he presents an argument in which there is no need for the supposition of infinite regress. This argument is as follows:

And also by another route: A thing does not require its own nonexistence, otherwise it would not occur. The Light of Lights is a unity; in itself it has no conditions. All else is subject to it. Since it has no condition and no opposite, there is nothing which can void it, so it is self-sufficient and everlasting. And the Light of Lights is not attached to any sort of shape, whether luminous or dark, and attributes are not possible for it in any aspect

— Shihab al-Din Yahya Suhrawardi, " Majmu’ah musannifat shaykh ishraq " (1957-1960), Henty Corbin, the collected works of Sheykh Eshraq.1977, Vol. 2, 122-123

This argument has a close link with the metaphor of light. According to Surawardi, if we suppose that existence is contingent then, if the regress of infinite is impossible, consequently there must be a first.

==== Mulla Sadra ====
Mulla Sadra explained the proof of the sincere in a way different from both Avicenna's version as well as Suhrevardi's. The differentiation with Avicenna differs in the argument of the existence as an existent. Mulla Sadra begins his argument with an existent in the world until he reaches the necessary existent. Mulla Sadra also rejects Suhrawardi’s statement of the argument from contingency.

And it is stated that existence, as was mentioned before, is a single, simple, objective reality (haqiqah ‘ayniyah). There is no difference in the essences (dhat) of its individuals, but only in perfection and imperfection and in intensity and weakness, or in other matters [not related to existence itself], for example, that between the whatnesses (mahiyyah) of the same species. The ultimate perfection for which there is nothing greater is that which does not depend on anything else, and nothing greater than it can be imagined, for all imperfect things are dependent on others, and are in need of the more complete. It has become clear that the complete is prior to the imperfect, and activity is prior to potentiality. Existence is prior to nothingness. It has also been made clear that the completion of a thing is that very thing with an addition. Therefore, existence is either independent of others or essentially (li dhat) in need of others.

The First is the Necessary Existent, which is Pure Existence than which nothing is more complete, and It is unmixed with non-existence and imperfection. The second is other than this, but is Its actions and effects, which rest upon nothing but It. And, as was mentioned, the reality (haqiqah) of existence has no deficiency, and if any imperfection occurs in it, it is only due to its being an effect, and this is because the effect cannot be of an equal degree to the existence of its cause. So, if existence were not something made (maj‘ul), dominated by that which brings it into existence and brings it about (as according to what it requires), it would not be imaginable that it should have any sort of imperfections. For the reality of existence, as you know, is simple. It is unlimited, not determinate, except for pure activity and occurrence, otherwise there would be mixture in it or it would have some essence other than existence in it.

We have also mentioned that if existence is an effect, then it is in itself something which is made by a making which is simple, and its essence (dhat) in itself is in need (muftaqra) of a maker (ja‘il), and it relies in its substance and essence (dhat) on its maker. Thus, it has been proven and made clear that existence is either complete reality (haqiqah) necessary in its ipseity (huwiyah), or it is essentially (dhatan) in need of it [i.e. that which is necessary in itself], substantially (jawhariyah) relying on it. According to each of these alternatives it has been proven and demonstrated that the existence of the Necessary Existent is in its ipseity needless of any other. This is what we intended. And know that this argument is extremely firm and strong, and its source is near to the way of the Illuminationists, which is based on the principle of light.

— Sadr al-Din Muhammad Shirazi, " al-Hikmat al-muta’allihiyah fi al-asfar al-’arbah " (Qom: Mustafavi, 1386/1966), Legenhausen, 2004, p. 10

== Reaction ==
=== Reception ===
Present-day historian of philosophy Peter Adamson called this argument one of the most influential medieval arguments for God's existence, and Avicenna's biggest contribution to the history of philosophy. Generations of Muslim philosophers and theologians took up the proof and its conception of God as a necessary existent with approval and sometimes with modifications. The phrase wajib al-wujud (necessary existent) became widely used to refer to God, even in the works of Avicenna's staunch critics, a sign of the proof's influence. Outside the Muslim tradition, it is also "enthusiastically" received, repeated, and modified by later philosophers such as Thomas Aquinas (1225–1274) and Duns Scotus (1266–1308) of the Western Christian tradition, as well by Jewish philosophers such as Maimonides (d. 1204).

Adamson said that one reason for its popularity is that it matches "an underlying rationale for many people's belief in God", which he contrasted with Anselm's ontological argument, formulated a few years later, which read more like a "clever trick" than a philosophical justification of one's faith. Professor of medieval philosophy Jon McGinnis said that the argument requires only a few premises, namely, the distinction between the necessary and the contingent, that "something exists", and that a set subsists through their members (an assumption McGinnis said to be "almost true by definition").

=== Criticism ===
The Islamic Andalusi philosopher Averroes or Ibn Rushd (1126–1198) criticized the argument on its methodology. Averroes, an avid Aristotelian, argued that God's existence has to be shown on the basis of the natural world, as Aristotle had done. According to Averroes, a proof should be based on physics, and not on metaphysical reflections as in the "Proof of the Truthful". Other Muslim philosophers such as Al-Ghazali (1058–1111) attacked the argument over its implications that seemed incompatible with God as known through the Islamic revelation. For example, according to Avicenna, God can have no features or relations that are contingent, so his causing of the universe must be necessary. Al-Ghazali disputed this as incompatible with the concept of God's untrammelled free will as taught in Al-Ghazali's Asharite theology. He further argued that God's free choice can be shown by the arbitrary nature of the exact size of the universe or the time of its creation.

Peter Adamson offered several more possible lines of criticism. He pointed out that Avicenna adopts a piecemeal approach to prove the necessary existent, and then derives God's traditional attributes from it one at a time. This makes each of the arguments subject to separate assessments. Some might accept the proof for the necessary existent while rejecting the other arguments; such a critic could still reject the existence of God. Another type of criticism might attack the proof of the necessary existent itself. Such a critic might reject Avicenna's conception of contingency, a starting point in the original proof, by saying that the universe could just happen to exist without being necessary or contingent on an external cause.

== Classification ==
German philosopher Immanuel Kant (1724–1804) divided arguments for the existence of God into three groups: ontological, cosmological, or teleological. Scholars disagree on whether Avicenna's "Proof of the Truthful" is ontological, that is, derived through sheer conceptual analysis, or cosmological, that is, derived by invoking empirical premises (e.g. "a contingent thing exists"). Scholars Herbert A. Davidson, Lenn E. Goodman, Michael E. Marmura, M. Saeed Sheikh, and Soheil Afnan argued that it was cosmological. Davidson said that Avicenna did not regard "the analysis of the concept necessary existent by virtue of itself as sufficient to establish the actual existence of anything in the external world" and that he had offered a new form of cosmological argument. Others, including Parviz Morewedge, Gary Legenhausen, Abdel Rahman Badawi, Miguel Cruz Hernández, and M. M. Sharif, argued that Avicenna's argument was ontological. Morewedge referred to the argument as "Ibn Sina's ontological argument for the existence of God", and said that it was purely based on his analytic specification of this concept [the Necessary Existent]." Steve A. Johnson and Toby Mayer said the argument was a hybrid of the two.
