= Gaunilo of Marmoutiers =

French Benedictine monk and philosopher

Gaunilo or Gaunillon (fl. 11th century) was a Benedictine monk of Marmoutier Abbey in Tours, France. He is best known for his contemporary criticism of the ontological argument for the existence of God which appeared in St. Anselm's Proslogion. In his work In Behalf of the Fool, (Note: The title of Gaunilo's book repeats Anselm's use of the fool mentioned in the Psalms who doubts the existence of God (Psalm 14:1 and Psalm 53:1).) Gaunilo contends that St. Anselm's ontological argument fails because logic of the same kind would force one to conclude many things exist which certainly do not. An empiricist, Gaunilo thought that the human intellect is only able to comprehend information provided by the senses.

Little beyond this essay is known of Gaunilo; no other extant writings bear his name. Anselm wrote a reply to it, essentially arguing that Gaunilo had definitely missed his point.

== The "Lost Island" refutation ==
Anselm claimed his ontological argument as proof of the existence of God, whom he described as that being for which no greater can be conceived. A god that does not exist cannot be that than which no greater can be conceived, as existence would make it greater. Thus, according to St. Anselm, the concept of God necessarily entails His existence. He denies Gaunilo a Godless epistemology.

Gaunilo criticised Anselm's argument by employing the same reasoning, via reductio ad absurdum, to "prove" the existence of the mythical "Lost Island", the greatest or most perfect island: if the island of which we are thinking does not exist, it cannot be the greatest conceivable island, for, to be the greatest conceivable island, it would have to exist, as any existent island would be greater than an imaginary one. This, of course, is merely a direct application of Anselm's own premise that existence is a perfection. Since we can conceive of this greatest or most perfect island, it must, by Anselm's way of thinking, exist. While this argument is absurd, Gaunilo claims that it is no more so than Anselm's.

Philosophers often attempt to prove the ontological argument wrong by comparing Anselm's with Gaunilo's. The former runs:

1. God is that being than which no greater can be conceived.
2. It is greater to exist in reality than merely as an idea.
3. If God does not exist, we can conceive of an even greater being, that is one that does exist.
4. Therefore, God must indeed exist in reality.

Gaunilo's parody runs along the same lines:

1. The Lost Island is that island than which no greater can be conceived.
2. It is greater to exist in reality than merely as an idea.
3. If the Lost Island does not exist, one can conceive of an even greater island, that is one that does exist.
4. Therefore, the Lost Island exists in reality.

If one of these arguments is sound, it has been asserted, they must both be sound. By Gaunilo's reckoning, however, one (and, therefore, the other, too) is unsound. The Lost Island does not exist, so there is something wrong with the logic that proves that it does. Because the argument proves true in one case that which is patently false (the Lost Island), it is fair to ask whether it may fairly be regarded as proving true the other case.

== Criticisms ==
Gaunilo's objection to the ontological argument has been criticised on several grounds. Anselm's own reply was essentially that Gaunilo had missed his point: any other being's existence is derived from God's, unnecessary in itself, and nonamenable to his ontological argument which can only ever properly apply to the single greatest being of all beings. Indeed, while we can try and conceive of a perfect island, that island is yet greater if it creates other beings, whereupon it would no longer be an island as we can understand it. Similarly, Alvin Plantinga tendered a reply to Gaunilo's remonstrance by arguing that the concept of "that than which nothing greater can be conceived" is not applicable to an island, or any other object, in the special way that it is applicable to God. Plantinga defends Anselm's proof by averring that it applies exclusively to Him. A necessary being is both existent and the greatest conceivable and greatest possible being. Only God, as Anselm defines him, meets all of those criteria and can, therefore, be dubbed a necessary being.

Another criticism of Gaunilo's argument points out that, whereas God is that thing than which no greater can be conceived, Gaunilo's is that island than which no greater can be conceived. Thus, while no island may exceed it in greatness, it is perfectly reasonable to suppose that some non-island could. "Consequently", wrote William L. Rowe in his summary of the polemic, "if we follow Anselm's reasoning exactly, it does not appear that we can derive an absurdity from the supposition that the island than which none greater is possible does not exist."

Gaunilo's refutation is also criticized on the grounds that it misinterprets the argument set forth by Anselm. Richard Campbell contends that the argument criticized by Gaunilo is incomplete because it represents only one of three stages of a larger argument, one that is not meant to be read as a proof for God but rather as the basis for the following chapter. He argues that since Anselm himself says in Reply I that if something than which a greater cannot be thought exists, it cannot be thought not to exist, a defender of Gaunilo must allow that this island cannot be thought not to exist. But in Proslogion III Anselm deduces that God exists from the premise that "Whatever is other than You can be thought not to exist". Thus, altering Anselm's formula but adopting his premises, entails that the Lost Island both can and cannot be thought not to exist. Since that is a contradiction, it follows that it is not legitimate to alter Anselm's formula.

== The remainder of Gaunilo's text ==
Gaunilo's treatise is divided into eight sections. The first seven of these sections are criticisms of Anselm's argument from the point of view of a rational non-believer. The last section (8) is simply praise for the remaining chapters of the Proslogion. The full title of Gaunilo's treatise is What Someone in Behalf of the Fool Replies to these Arguments – this means Gaunilo does not write as a fellow Christian who believes; rather, he pretends to be a rational non-believer. The scholarly debate has focused on section 6 (the Lost Island Refutation). Very few scholars engage with the remaining sections of Gaunilo's text.
