= Metaphysical necessity =

Philosophical concept

In philosophy, metaphysical necessity, sometimes called broad logical necessity, is one of many different kinds of necessity, which sits between logical necessity and nomological (or physical) necessity, in the sense that logical necessity entails metaphysical necessity, but not vice versa, and metaphysical necessity entails physical necessity, but not vice versa. A proposition is said to be necessary if it could not have failed to be the case. Nomological necessity is necessity according to the laws of physics and logical necessity is necessity according to the laws of logic, while metaphysical necessities are necessary in the sense that the world could not possibly have been otherwise. What facts are metaphysically necessary, and on what basis we might view certain facts as metaphysically but not logically necessary are subjects of substantial discussion in contemporary philosophy.

The concept of a metaphysically necessary being plays an important role in certain arguments for the existence of God, especially the ontological argument, but metaphysical necessity is also one of the central concepts in late 20th century analytic philosophy. Metaphysical necessity has proved a controversial concept, and criticized by David Hume, Immanuel Kant, J. L. Mackie, and Richard Swinburne, among others.

== Types of necessity ==
Metaphysical necessity is contrasted with other types of necessity. Metaphysical necessity is often the most difficult to distinguish. Therefore, it can be helpful to understand the different types to distinguish each more clearly.

1. Logical necessity: Logical necessity depends on the laws of logic. In order to claim that something is a logical necessity, it must abide by all the laws of logic. This means there must be no contradictions in First-order logic. For example, it is accurate to state that some oranges are apples, but it would not follow the laws of logic to say that some oranges are not oranges.
2. Technological necessity: Technological necessity depends on the laws of technology. For something to be a technological necessity, it must fall within the current technological advancement up to that point. Technological necessities are constantly evolving and are the only type of necessity that can actually change or grow as new technologies are developed, allowing for more necessities, whereas the other types of necessity are fixed. An example of something that is technologically possible is flying with a Jet pack for short distances, however it is not technologically possible yet to fly with a jetpack from LA to NYC.
3. Physical necessity: Physical necessity depends on the laws of physics. Causation is an example of a physical necessity because it falls within the laws of physics. For something to be physically necessary means that it is essential, given the current laws of physics. However, that doesn't mean that it must be observable like it would have to be for technological necessity; instead, as long as there is a law of physics that states that it is possible, it would be considered physically necessary.
4. Metaphysical necessity: Metaphysical necessity depends on the laws of metaphysics. Something abides by the laws of metaphysics if it is Grounding. In the Euthyphro dilemma, piety is grounded in love by the gods. It provides a good example of what it means to follow a law of metaphysics, and in the case of the dilemma it is used to express a law about the nature of piety. Another example is that something is physical if and only if it is touchable, and the grounding law would be that something is physical if and only if it has mass. Metaphysical necessity can be difficult to grasp, but if something is not logical, technological, or physical, it is most likely a metaphysical necessity.

== Hume's dictum ==
Hume's dictum is a thesis about necessary connections between distinct entities. Its original formulation can be found in David Hume's Treatise of Human Nature: "There is no object, which implies the existence of any other if we consider these objects in themselves". Hume's intuition motivating this thesis is that while experience presents us with certain ideas of various objects, it might as well have presented us with very different ideas. So when I perceive a bird on a tree, I might as well have perceived a bird without a tree or a tree without a bird. This is so because their essences do not depend upon another. David Lewis follows this line of thought in formulating his principle of recombination: "anything can coexist with anything else, at least provided they occupy distinct spatiotemporal positions. Likewise, anything can fail to coexist with anything else".

Hume's dictum has been employed in various arguments in contemporary metaphysics. It can be used, for example, as an argument against nomological necessitarianism, the view that the laws of nature are necessary, i.e. are the same in all possible worlds. To see how this might work, consider the case of salt being thrown into a cup of water and subsequently dissolving. This can be described as a series of two events, a throwing-event and a dissolving-event. Necessitarians hold that all possible worlds with the throwing-event also contain a subsequent dissolving-event. But the two events are distinct entities, so according to Hume's dictum, it is possible to have one event without the other. An even wider application is to use Hume's dictum as an axiom of modality to determine which propositions or worlds are possible based on the notion of recombination.

Ludwig Wittgenstein likewise critiqued the notion of 'metaphysical neccessity' writing that "the sun will rise to-morrow, is an hypothesis; and that means that we do not know whether it will rise. A necessity for one thing to happen because another has happened does not exist. There is only logical necessity".

== Absolute necessity ==
Absolute necessity is a modality of necessity which is at least as strong as all others, where all its necessities are necessities of every other type. Philosophers disagree over whether logical necessity or metaphysical necessity is absolute, with some arguing they are identical and others distinguishing them. This debate centers on whether logical necessity, grounded in formal logic, or metaphysical necessity, often tied to the essences of objects, provides the most fundamental account of what must be true.

=== Logical necessity as absolute necessity ===
If logical necessity is absolute, then all logical necessities (e.g., "if A then B") are also physical or metaphysical necessities. Some philosophers, notably Bob Hale, argue that logical necessity is absolute necessity, meaning there is no sense in which a logical necessity could be false. Hale defines logical necessity broadly to include not only logical truths (e.g., "A or not-A") but also conceptual necessities, such as "all vixens are female," which depend on the meanings of nonlogical terms. His argument, inspired by Ian McFetridge, uses a reductio ad absurdum: assuming a logical necessity (e.g., "if A then B") and a possibility where it fails leads to a contradiction, suggesting logical necessities hold in all possible scenarios. Hale posits that logical necessity is the most restrictive modality, subsumed by all other necessities, making it absolute.

Critics, such as Scott Shalkowski, challenge this view, arguing that Hale’s broadly logical necessity is not absolute because stricter necessities, like austerely logical necessity (truths dependent only on logical constants), exist. Additionally, nontraditional logics, such as paraconsistent logics, allow contradictions to be possible, undermining Hale’s assumption that contradictions are impossible. Shalkowski contends that Hale’s argument fails to establish logical necessity as absolute, as it does not address essentialist claims that metaphysical necessity is more fundamental.

=== Metaphysical necessity and essentialism ===
Essentialist philosophers argue that metaphysical necessity, grounded in the essences or natures of objects, is absolute, with logical necessity as a subset. Essentialism holds that some truths are necessary due to the intrinsic nature of objects or propositions, such as water’s chemical composition (H_{2}O) or an object's origin. For example, while it is logically possible for a lectern to be made of ice, essentialists argue it is metaphysically impossible if its essence requires a different material. Similarly, Queen Elizabeth II’s parentage is essential to her identity, ruling out logical possibilities of different origins.

Shalkowski argues that logical necessity depends on a prior metaphysical necessity, as model-theoretic accounts of logical truths (e.g., truth in all models) assume modal constraints about what counts as a possible model. Essentialists view logical necessities as truths about the essences of logical items (e.g., propositions) or universal truths across all objects, while nonlogical metaphysical necessities are specific to certain entities. By constraining genuine possibilities to those consistent with essences, metaphysical necessity is seen as absolute, unlike logical necessity, which overgenerates possibilities by ignoring specific essences.

=== Ongoing debate ===
The debate over absolute necessity reflects differing views on modality's foundations. Proponents of logical necessity value its apparent clarity and formal grounding, while essentialists argue it presupposes metaphysical commitments. Both sides rely on a priori reasoning to justify their constraints on possibility, leaving the question of absolute necessity open for further exploration.

== A posteriori and necessary truths ==
In Naming and Necessity, Saul Kripke argued that there were a posteriori truths, such as "Hesperus is Phosphoros", or "Water is H_{2}O", that were nonetheless metaphysically necessary.

== Necessity in theology ==
While many theologians (e.g. Anselm of Canterbury, René Descartes, and Gottfried Leibniz) considered God to be a logically or metaphysically necessary being, Richard Swinburne argued for factual necessity, and Alvin Plantinga argues that God is a causally necessary being. Because a factually or causally necessary being does not exist by logical necessity, it does not exist in all logically possible worlds. Therefore, Swinburne used the term "ultimate brute fact" for the existence of God.

== See also ==
- Ananke
- Contingency
- Modal logic
- Mathematical Platonism
