= The Saluting Marine =

American army sergeant

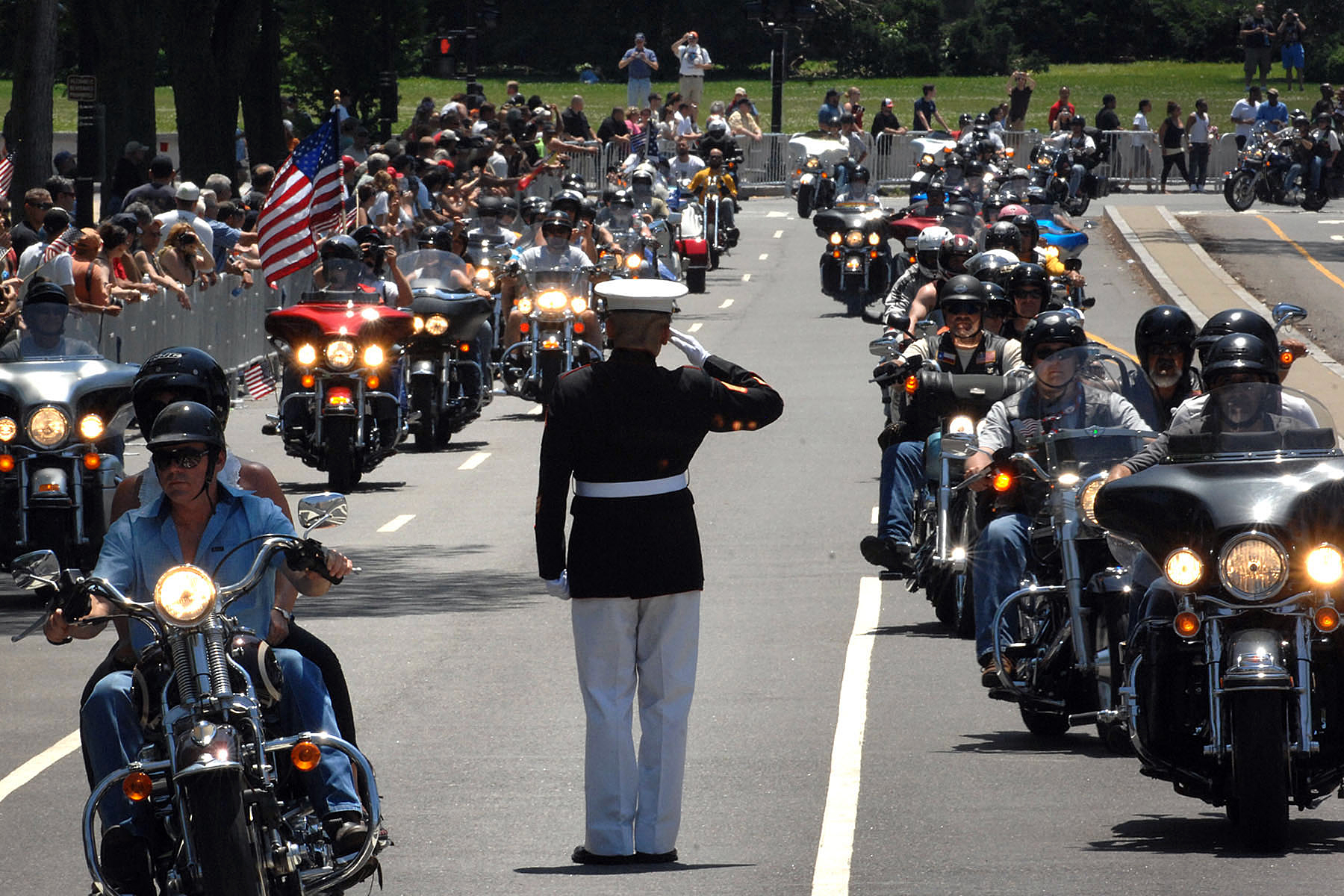

Staff Sergeant Tim Chambers, better known as "The Saluting Marine", is the uniformed veteran who stands and salutes in the middle of the motorcycle traffic during the Rolling to Remember demonstrations (formerly called Rolling Thunder) in Washington D.C., on the Sunday before Memorial Day. He has done so since 2001, in the aftermath of the September 11 attacks. He often holds his salute for hours while the motorcycle parade passes by.

Since he set the example, other veterans have performed similar acts at National Cemeteries around the country on other veteran related holidays.
