= Timothy Chambers =

American philosopher

Timothy Chambers is a philosopher who has written a number of articles which have appeared in the journals Mind, the Monist (1998), Philosophy (2001), the Aristotelian Society Proceedings (2000), and Ratio (1999). His research interests include Hilary Putnam, time travel, the Ontological Argument, the Doomsday Argument and the semantics of vagueness. His work on Putnam included a logical formula—the Chambers Conditional—which figures in Crispin Wright's recent work on vagueness.
