= Proslogion =

Prayer by Saint Anselm of Canterbury

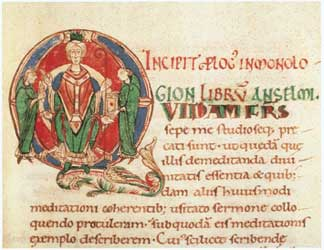
- Illuminated initial from the beginning of the prologue to Anselm's Monologion, late 11th century
- Author: Anselm of Canterbury
- Original title: Fides quaerens intellectum
- Language: Medieval Latin
- Publication date: 1078
- Text: Proslogion at Wikisource

The Proslogion (Latin: Proslogium, lit. 'Discourse') is a prayer (or meditation) written by the medieval cleric Saint Anselm of Canterbury between 1077 and 1078. In each chapter, Anselm juxtaposes contrasting attributes of God to resolve apparent contradictions in Christian theology. This meditation is considered the first-known philosophical formulation that sets out an ontological argument for the existence of God.

The original title for this discourse was to be Faith Seeking Understanding.

== Ontological arguments ==
The Proslogion marked what would be the beginning of Saint Anselm's famous and highly controversial ontological arguments for the existence of God. Anselm's first and most famous argument is found at the end of Chapter II, and it is followed by his second argument. Opinions concerning Anselm's twin ontological arguments widely differ, and have differed since the Proslogion was first conceived.

=== First argument ===
There are various reconstructions of Anselm's first argument. Scott H. Moore's analysis is as follows:

- Proposition 1: God is a being than which none greater can be conceived.
- Proposition 2: If existence in reality is greater than existence in the mind alone, an imagined being who exists only in our mind is not a "being than which none greater can be conceived." A being than which none greater can be conceived must also exist in reality, where failure to do so would be a failure to be such.
- Conclusion: Thus a being than which none greater can be conceived must exist, and we call this being God.
- Because it is greater to exist in reality than in the mind only, the being that nothing greater than can be thought of will exist both in the mind and in reality.

=== Second argument ===
Donald Viney renders Anselm's second argument as follows:

1. "God" means "that than which nothing greater can be conceived."
2. The idea of God is not contradictory.
3. That which can be thought of as not existing (a contingent being) is not as great as that which cannot be thought of as not existing (a necessary being).
4. Therefore, to think of God as possibly not existing (as contingent) is not to think of the greatest conceivable being. It is a contradiction to think of the greatest conceivable being as nonexistent.
5. Therefore, God exists.

=== Formal Reconstruction in a set theoretic form (by Gyorgy Gereby) ===
==== Vocabulary for the argument in a set logical form ====
- R – not empty set of mind-independent real things
- S – not empty set of (individual) people
- P – set of sentences or propositions
- I – set of mental contents (represent the meaning of sentences of P)
- T = S XP --> I – is the function of “thinking of”, which assigns to sentences uttered by persons an intelligible element i of I
- C = I --> R correspondence-function, which assigns to certain elements of I certain elements of R
- V = { i | i ∈ I, ∃ r. r ∈ R, r = C (i)} – Set of mental things that have a counterpart in R
- U = I \ V – set of things that do not have a counterpart in R
- b ∈ S – individual name of the fool
- g – individual name for god

==== The Argument of Anselm ====
| T (b, ‘ ~ ∃r. r = C (g) ‘) | The Fool says in his heart that there is no God. | Existential premiss |
| g = def !x. ~ ∃ y. y ≥ x | God is the only one thing greater than which cannot be conceived. | Definition, stipulating uniqueness |
| ∀x. x ∈ P & ∃y. T(y, ‘x’) ⊇ x ∈ I | What is said and understood is in the mind. | Assumption, on T def., |
| g ∈ I | What is understood by the Fool of the definition is in his intellect. | |
| ∀ i. ∀i*. i* ∈ U, i ∈ V, i > i* | Whatever is in the intellect and also in reality is greater than that which is solely in the intellect. | def. |
| g ∈ V | | lemma |
| g ∉ V | g is only in the intellect. (‘God is only a concept’ – however, there is a god-concept) | Assumption for the reductio ad absurdum |
| g ∉ V → g ∈ U | ∀x. x ∈ V V x ∈ U | |
| V ≠ Ø | V is not empty. | Assumption |
| ∃ g*. g* ∈ V > g ∈ U | The God which is an element of V is a greater thing than God in the mind. | |
| ~ ∃x. x ≥ g & ∃x. x > g | God is the greater-than-which-can-not-be-conceived and God is not the greater-than-which-can-not-be-conceived. | Contradiction. Conclusion of the reduction. |
| g ∈ V | Lemma Q.E.D | Conclusion of lemma |
| ∀v. ∃r. r = C (v) | Applying the character of V | Definition |
| ∃r. r = C (g) | Q.E.D.: God is in the intellect in such a way that he has a counterpart in reality. | |
| ‘C(g)’ ∈ R | Lemma: God exists in reality. | Rule of detachment |

=== Supplement ===
Anselm writes in Chapter XI that "you [God] are not only that than which a greater cannot be conceived, but you are a being greater than can be conceived."

== Chapters ==
- Chapter I: Exhortation of the mind to the contemplation of God.
- Chapter II: That God Truly Exists
- Chapter III: That God Cannot be Thought Not to Exist
- Chapter IV: How the Fool Managed to Say in His Heart That Which Cannot be Thought
- Chapter V: That God is whatever it is better to be than not to be, and that existing through Himself alone He makes all other beings from nothing
- Chapter VI: How He is perceptive although He is not a body
- Chapter VII: How He is omnipotent although He cannot do many things
- Chapter VIII: How He is both merciful and impassible
- Chapter IX: How the all-just and supremely just One spares the wicked and justly has mercy on the wicked
- Chapter X: How He justly punishes and justly spares the wicked
- Chapter XI: How 'all the ways of the Lord are mercy and truth', and yet how 'the Lord is just in all His ways'
- Chapter XII: That God is the very life by which He lives and that the same holds for like attributes
- Chapter XIII: How He alone is limitless and eternal, although other spirits are also limitless and eternal
- Chapter XIV: How and why God is both seen and not seen by those seeking Him
- Chapter XV: How He is greater than can be thought
- Chapter XVI: That this is the 'inaccessible light' in which He 'dwells'
- Chapter XVII: That harmony, fragrance, sweetness, softness, and beauty are in God according to His own ineffable manner
- Chapter XVIII: That there are no parts in God or in His eternity which He is
- Chapter XIX: That He is not in place or time but all things are in Him
- Chapter XX: That He is before and beyond even all eternal things
- Chapter XXI: Whether this is the 'age of the age' or the 'ages of the ages'
- Chapter XXII: That He alone is what He is and who He is
- Chapter XXIII: That this good is equally Father and Son and Holy Spirit, and that this is the one necessary being which is altogether and wholly and solely good
- Chapter XXIV: A speculation as to what kind and how great this good is
- Chapter XXV: Which goods belong to those who enjoy this good and how great they are
- Chapter XXVI: Whether this is the 'fullness of joy' which the Lord promises

== Translations ==
There are different translations of the Proslogion.

=== Chapter I ===
Excerpt:Psalms 27:8

Original translation, from Latin

Up now, slight man! flee, for a little while, your occupations; hide yourself, for a time, from your disturbing thoughts. Cast aside, now, your burdensome cares, and put away your toilsome business. Yield room for some little time to God; and rest for a little time in him. Enter the inner chamber of your mind; shut out all thoughts save that of God, and such as can aid you in seeking him; close your door and seek him. Speak now, my whole heart! speak now to God, saying, I seek your face; your face, Lord, will I seek (Psalms xxvii. 8). And come you now, O Lord my God, teach my heart where and how it may seek you, where and how it may find you.

— translated by Sidney Norton Deane, 1903
Translation:

Modern translation

Come on now little man, get away from your worldly occupations for a while, escape from your tumultuous thoughts. Lay aside your burdensome cares and put off your laborious exertions. Give yourself over to God for a little while, and rest for a while in Him. Enter into the cell of your mind, shut out everything except God and whatever helps you to seek Him once the door is shut. Speak now, my heart, and say to God, "I seek your face; your face, Lord, I seek.

— translated by David Burr, 1996

== Editions ==
- "Proslogion" (in English), St. Anselm: Basic Writings, edited and translated by S. N. Deane. 1962. Chicago: Open Court. ISBN 0-87548-109-4.
- "Anselmus Cantuariensis Proslogion" (in Latin). The Latin Library. Retrieved July 25, 2006.
