= Outline of theology =

Overview of and topical guide to theology

The following outline is provided as an overview of, and topical guide to, theology.

Theology is the systematic study of the nature of the divine. It is taught as an academic discipline, typically in universities, seminaries and schools of divinity.

== Apologetics ==
Apologetics is the whole of the consensus of the views of those who defend a position in an argument of long standing.

  - General: List of apologetic works
  - Polemic
  - Positive Deconstruction
  - More...
- Bahá'í: Bahá'í apologetics
  - Christian: Christian apologetics
  - Christian apologists
  - List of Christian apologetic works
  - Ecumenical Apologetics
  - Presuppositional apologetics
  - Epistle to Diognetus
  - Trilemma
  - Urmonotheismus
  - More...
- Muslim: Muslim apologists

== Eschatology ==
Eschatology, literally the "study of the last", is the part of theology and philosophy concerned with the end of the world.

- Afterlife
- Apocalypticism
- Buddhist
- Christian
- Concepts of Heaven
- Doomsday films
- Ghost Dance Movement
- Ghosts
- Hindu
- Islamic
- Jewish
- Personifications of death
- Singularitarianism
- Taoist
- Zoroastrian
- More

== Fields ==
- Feminist
  - Thealogy
  - Womanist
- Exo-
- Holocaust
- Practical
- Process
- Queer

== God ==
=== Conceptions ===
- God
  - As: Absolute
  - Emanation
  - Logos
  - In: Abrahamic religions
  - Bahá'í Faith
  - Christianity
  - Hinduism
  - Islam
  - Jainism
  - Judaism
  - Sikhism
  - Zoroastrianism
  - More...

=== Names of God ===
  - In: Christianity
  - Hinduism
  - Islam
  - Judaism
  - More...

=== Existence of God ===
==== Arguments for ====
- A proper basis
- Beauty
- Consciousness
- Degree
- Desire
- Love
- Miracles
- Morality
- Reason
- Religious experience
- Cosmological
- Ontological
- Pascal's wager
- Teleological
- Trademark
- Transcendental
- Witness
- More...

==== Arguments against ====
- Free will
- Inconsistent revelations
- Nonbelief
- Poor design
- God of the gaps
- Incompatible-properties argument
- Omnipotence paradox
- Problem of evil
- Problem of Hell
- Theological noncognitivism
- Transcendental argument for the existence of God
- More...

=== Views ===
- Aristotelian view of God
- Binitarianism
- Death of God
- Divine simplicity
- Divine presence
- Egotheism
- Great Architect of the Universe
- Great Spirit
- Apophatic theology
- Olelbis
- Open theism
- Personal god
- Phenomenological definition of God
- Philo's view of God
- Sarav viāpak
- Taryenyawagon
- Tian
- Trinity
- Unmoved mover
- More...

== Theism ==
Theism in the broadest sense is the belief in the existence of a god or gods. In the more specific sense used here theism refers to a particular doctrine concerning the nature of a God and its relationship to the universe.

  - List of belief systems
  - Deity (Divinity
  - Numen
  - Male
  - Female
  - Gender of)
  - Deism
  - Dystheism
  - Henotheism
  - Kathenotheism
  - Nontheism
  - Monolatrism
  - Monotheism
  - Panentheism
  - Pandeism
  - Pantheism
  - Polydeism
  - Polytheism
  - Theopanism
  - More...

== Theologies ==
  - Christian: of the Bible
  - Terms
  - Christology
  - Cosmology
  - Ecclesiology
  - Ethics
  - Hamartiology
  - Law
  - Messianism
  - Movements
  - Nestorianism
  - New testament
  - Old testament
  - Philosophy
  - Pope Pius XII
  - Sophiology
  - Soteriology
  - More...
  - Hindu: Ayyavazhi theology
  - Hindu philosophical concepts
  - Krishnology
  - More...
  - Islamic: Aqidah
  - Mutazilites
  - Shi'a theology
  - More...
  - Jewish: Abrahamic prophecy
  - Angels in Judaism
  - Jewish mysticism
  - Other: Chinese
  - Zoroastrian
  - More...

== Seminaries and theological colleges ==
  - Anglican
  - Buddhist
  - Eastern Orthodox
  - Evangelical
  - Islamic
  - Jewish
  - Lutheran
  - Madrassas
  - Methodist
  - Reformed Church
  - Roman Catholic
  - More...

== Resources ==
- Theological libraries and librarianship
- List of theology journals

== Practitioners ==
- Theologians

== See also ==
- Ascetical theology
- Biblical theology
- Constructive theology
- Doctor of Divinity
- Exegesis
- Formal and material principles of theology
- Heresy
- Hierology
- History of theology
- Liberation theology
- Moral theology
- Mystical theology
- Natural theology
- Neurotheology
- Odium theologicum
- Ontological and theological perfection
- Religious philosophy
- Propitiation
- Scholasticism
- Systematic theology
- Thealogy
- Theogony
- Theological aesthetics
- Theosony
