= Existence of God =

Philosophical question

The existence of God is a subject of debate in the philosophy of religion and theology. A wide variety of arguments for and against the existence of God (with the same or similar arguments also generally being used when talking about the existence of multiple deities) can be categorized as logical, empirical, metaphysical, subjective, or scientific. In philosophical terms, the question of the existence of God involves the disciplines of epistemology (the nature and scope of knowledge) and ontology (study of the nature of being or existence) and the theory of value (since some definitions of God include perfection).

The Western tradition of philosophical discussion of the existence of God began with Plato and Aristotle, who made arguments for the existence of a being responsible for fashioning the universe, referred to as the demiurge or the unmoved mover, that today would be categorized as cosmological arguments. Other arguments for the existence of God have been proposed by St. Anselm, who formulated the first ontological argument; Thomas Aquinas, who presented his own version of the cosmological argument (the first way); René Descartes, who said that the existence of a benevolent God is logically necessary for the evidence of the senses to be meaningful. John Calvin argued for a sensus divinitatis, which gives each human a knowledge of God's existence. Islamic philosophers who developed arguments for the existence of God include Averroes, who made arguments influenced by Aristotle's concept of the unmoved mover; Al-Ghazali and Al-Kindi, who presented the Kalam cosmological argument; Avicenna, who presented the Proof of the Truthful; and Al-Farabi, who made Neoplatonic arguments.

In philosophy, specifically the philosophy of religion, atheism refers to the proposition that God does not exist. Some religions, such as Jainism, reject the possibility of a creator deity. Philosophers who have provided arguments against the existence of God include David Hume, Ludwig Feuerbach, and Bertrand Russell.

Theism, the proposition that God exists, is the dominant view among philosophers of religion. In a 2020 PhilPapers survey, 69.50% of philosophers of religion stated that they accept or lean towards theism, while 19.86% stated they accept or lean towards atheism. However, philosophers as a whole tend to be more skeptical of God’s existence: the same survey found that 66.72% of all philosophers surveyed accepted or leaned towards atheism, while 18.64% accepted or leaned towards theism. Prominent contemporary philosophers of religion who defended theism include Alvin Plantinga, Yujin Nagasawa, John Hick, Richard Swinburne, and William Lane Craig, while those who defended atheism include Graham Oppy, Quentin Smith, J. L. Mackie, and J. L. Schellenberg.

== Positions ==
Positions on the existence of God can be divided along numerous axes, producing a variety of orthogonal classifications. Theism and atheism are positions of belief or lack of it, while gnosticism and agnosticism are positions of knowledge or the lack of it. Ignosticism concerns belief about God's conceptual coherence. Apatheism concerns belief about the practical importance of whether God exists.

For the purposes of discussion, Richard Dawkins described seven "milestones" on his spectrum of theistic probability:

1. Strong theist. 100% probability that God exists. In the words of Carl G. Jung: "I do not believe, I know."
2. De facto theist. Very high probability but short of 100%. "I don't know for certain, but I strongly believe in God and live my life on the assumption that he is there."
3. Leaning towards theism. Higher than 50% but not very high. "I am very uncertain, but I am inclined to believe in God."
4. Completely impartial. Exactly 50%. "God's existence and nonexistence are exactly equiprobable."
5. Leaning towards atheism. Lower than 50% but not very low. "I do not know whether God exists but I'm inclined to be skeptical."
6. De facto atheist. Very low probability, but short of zero. "I don't know for certain but I think God is very improbable, and I live my life on the assumption that he is not there."
7. Strong atheist. "I know there is no God, with the same conviction as Jung knows there is one."

=== Theism ===
The Catholic Church, following the teachings of Paul the Apostle (e.g., Romans 1:20), Thomas Aquinas, and the First Vatican Council, affirms that God's existence "can be known with certainty from the created world by the natural light of human reason".

==== Traditional religious definition of God ====
In classical theism, God is characterized as the metaphysically ultimate being (the first, timeless, absolutely simple and sovereign being, who is devoid of any anthropomorphic qualities), in distinction to other conceptions such as theistic personalism, open theism, and process theism. Classical theists do not believe that God can be completely defined. They believe it would contradict the transcendent nature of God for mere humans to define him. Robert Barron explains by analogy that it seems impossible for a two-dimensional object to conceive of three-dimensional humans.

In modern Western societies, the concepts of God typically entail a monotheistic, supreme, ultimate, and personal being, as found in the Christian, Islamic and Jewish traditions. In monotheistic religions outside the Abrahamic traditions, the existence of God is discussed in similar terms. In these traditions, God is also identified as the author (either directly or by inspiration) of certain texts, or that certain texts describe specific historical events caused by the God in question or communications from God (whether in direct speech or via dreams or omens). Some traditions also believe that God is the entity which is currently answering prayers for intervention or information or opinions.

Many Islamic scholars have used philosophical and rational arguments to prove the existence of God. For example, Ibn Rushd, a 12th-century Islamic scholar, philosopher, and physician, states there are only two arguments worthy of adherence, both of which are found in what he calls the "Precious Book" (The Qur'an). Rushd cites "providence" and "invention" in using the Qur'an's parables to claim the existence of God. Rushd argues that the Earth's weather patterns are conditioned to support human life; thus, if the planet is so finely-tuned to maintain life, then it suggests a fine tuner—God. The Sun and the Moon are not just random objects floating in the Milky Way, rather they serve us day and night, and the way nature works and how life is formed, humankind benefits from it. Rushd essentially comes to a conclusion that there has to be a higher being who has made everything perfectly to serve the needs of human beings.

Moses ben Maimon, widely known as Maimonides, was a Jewish scholar who tried to logically prove the existence of God. Maimonides offered proofs for the existence of God, but he did not begin with defining God first, like many others do. Rather, he used the description of the Earth and the universe to prove the existence of God. He talked about the Heavenly bodies and how they are committed to eternal motion. Maimonides argued that because every physical object is finite, it can only contain a finite amount of power. If everything in the universe, which includes all the planets and the stars, is finite, then there has to be an infinite power to push forth the motion of everything in the universe. Narrowing down to an infinite being, the only thing that can explain the motion is an infinite being (meaning God) which is neither a body nor a force in the body. Maimonides believed that this argument gives us a ground to believe that God is, not an idea of what God is. He believed that God cannot be understood or be compared.

==== Non-personal definitions of God ====
In pantheism, God and the universe are considered to be the same thing. In this view, the natural sciences are essentially studying the nature of God. This definition of God creates the philosophical problem that a universe with God and one without God are the same, other than the words used to describe it.

Deism and panentheism assert that there is a God distinct from, or which extends beyond (either in time or in space or in some other way) the universe. These positions deny that God intervenes in the operation of the universe, including communicating with humans personally. The notion that God never intervenes or communicates with the universe, or may have evolved into the universe (as in pandeism), makes it difficult, if not by definition impossible, to distinguish between a universe with God and one without.

The Ethics of Baruch Spinoza gave two demonstrations of the existence of God. The God of Spinoza is uncaused by any external force and has no free will, it is not personal and not anthropomorphic.

In Vedantic and Taoist traditions, ultimate reality is regarded as a non-personal reality beyond all qualifications.

==== Debate about how theism should be argued ====
In Christian faith, theologian and philosopher Thomas Aquinas made a distinction between: (a) preambles of faith and (b) articles of faith. The preambles include alleged truths contained in revelation which are nevertheless demonstrable by reason, e.g., the immortality of the soul, the existence of God. The articles of faith, on the other hand, contain truths that cannot be proven or reached by reason alone and presuppose the truths of the preambles, e.g., in Christianity, the Holy Trinity, is not demonstrable and presupposes the existence of God.

The argument that the existence of God can be known to all, even prior to exposure to any divine revelation, predates Christianity. Paul the Apostle made this argument when he said that pagans were without excuse because "since the creation of the world God's invisible nature, namely, his eternal power and deity, has been clearly perceived in the things that have been made". In this, Paul alludes to the proofs for a creator, later enunciated by Thomas Aquinas and others, that had also been explored by the Greek philosophers.

Another apologetical school of thought, including Dutch and American Reformed thinkers (such as Abraham Kuyper, Benjamin Warfield, and Herman Dooyeweerd), emerged in the late 1920s. This school was instituted by Cornelius Van Til, and came to be popularly called presuppositional apologetics (though Van Til felt "transcendental" would be a more accurate title). The main distinction between this approach and the more classical evidentialist approach is that the presuppositionalist denies any common ground between the believer and the non-believer, except that which the non-believer denies, namely, the assumption of the truth of the theistic worldview. In other words, presuppositionalists do not believe that the existence of God can be proven by appeal to raw, uninterpreted, or "brute" facts, which have the same (theoretical) meaning to people with fundamentally different worldviews, because they deny that such a condition is even possible. They claim that the only possible proof for the existence of God is that the very same belief is the necessary condition to the intelligibility of all other human experience and action. They attempt to prove the existence of God by means of appeal to the transcendental necessity of the belief—indirectly (by appeal to the unavowed presuppositions of the non-believer's worldview) rather than directly (by appeal to some form of common factuality). In practice, this school uses what have come to be known as transcendental arguments. These arguments claim to demonstrate that all human experience and action (even the condition of unbelief, itself) is a proof for the existence of God, because God's existence is the necessary condition of their intelligibility.

Protestant Christians note that the Christian faith teaches "salvation is by faith", and that faith is reliance upon the faithfulness of God. The most extreme example of this position is called fideism, which holds that faith is simply the will to believe, and argues that if God's existence were rationally demonstrable, faith in its existence would become superfluous. Søren Kierkegaard argued that objective knowledge, such as 1+1=2, is unimportant to existence. If God could rationally be proven, his existence would be unimportant to humans. It is because God cannot rationally be proven that his existence is important to us. In The Justification of Knowledge, the Calvinist theologian Robert L. Reymond argues that believers should not attempt to prove the existence of God. Since he believes all such proofs are fundamentally unsound, believers should not place their confidence in them, much less resort to them in discussions with non-believers; rather, they should accept the content of revelation by faith. Reymond's position is similar to that of his mentor Gordon Clark, which holds that all worldviews are based on certain unprovable first premises (or, axioms), and therefore are ultimately unprovable. The Christian theist therefore must simply choose to start with Christianity rather than anything else, by a "leap of faith". This position is also sometimes called presuppositional apologetics, but should not be confused with the Van Tillian variety.

=== Atheism ===
In the philosophy of religion, atheism is standardly defined as the metaphysical claim that God does not exist. In 1972, Antony Flew proposed defining atheism as the psychological state of lacking any belief in God. However, Flew's definition is usually rejected, due to the need for a name for the direct opposite proposition to theism, the metaphysical claim that God does exist.

==== Positive atheism ====
Positive atheism (also called "strong atheism" and "hard atheism") is a proposed form of atheism that asserts that no deities exist. The strong atheist explicitly asserts the non-existence of gods.

==== Negative atheism ====
Negative atheism (also called "weak atheism" and "soft atheism") is a proposed form of atheism other than positive, wherein a person does not believe in the existence of any deities, but does not explicitly assert there to be none.

=== Agnosticism ===
Agnosticism is the view that the truth value of certain claims—especially claims about the existence of any deity, but also other religious and metaphysical claims—is unknown or unknowable. Agnosticism does not define one's belief or disbelief in gods; agnostics may still identify themselves as theists or atheists.

==== Strong agnosticism ====
Strong agnosticism is the belief that it is impossible for humans to know whether or not any deities exist.

==== Weak agnosticism ====
Weak agnosticism is the belief that the existence or nonexistence of deities is unknown but not necessarily unknowable.

==== Agnostic theism ====
Agnostic theism is the philosophical view that encompasses both theism and agnosticism. An agnostic theist believes in the existence of a god or God, but regards the basis of this proposition as unknown or inherently unknowable. Agnostic theists may also insist on ignorance regarding the properties of the gods they believe in.

==== Agnostic atheism ====
Agnostic atheism is a philosophical position that encompasses both atheism and agnosticism. Agnostic atheists are atheistic because they do not hold a belief in the existence of any deity and agnostic because they claim that the existence of a deity is either unknowable in principle or currently unknown in fact.

The theologian Robert Flint explains:

If a man have failed to find any good reason for believing that there is a God, it is perfectly natural and rational that he should not believe that there is a God; and if so, he is an atheist, although he assume no superhuman knowledge, but merely the ordinary human power of judging of evidence. If he go farther, and, after an investigation into the nature and reach of human knowledge, ending in the conclusion that the existence of God is incapable of proof, cease to believe in it on the ground that he cannot know it to be true, he is an agnostic and also an atheist, an agnostic-atheist—an atheist because an agnostic."

=== Apatheism ===
An apatheist is someone who is not interested in accepting or denying any claims that gods exist or do not exist. An apatheist lives as if there are no gods and explains natural phenomena without reference to any deities. The existence of gods is not rejected, but may be designated unnecessary or useless; gods neither provide purpose to life, nor influence everyday life, according to this view.

=== Ignosticism ===
The ignostic (or igtheist) usually concludes that the question of God's existence or nonexistence is usually not worth discussing because concepts like "God" are usually not sufficiently or clearly defined. Ignosticism or igtheism is the theological position that every other theological position (including agnosticism and atheism) assumes too much about the concept of God and many other theological concepts. It can be defined as encompassing two related views about the existence of God. The first view is that a coherent definition of God must be presented before the question of the existence of God can be meaningfully discussed. Furthermore, if that definition is unfalsifiable, the ignostic takes the theological noncognitivist position that the question of the existence of God (per that definition) is meaningless. In this case, the concept of God is not considered meaningless; the term "God" is considered meaningless. The second view is synonymous with theological noncognitivism, and skips the step of first asking "What is meant by 'God'?" before proclaiming the original question "Does God exist?" as meaningless.

Some philosophers have seen ignosticism as a variation of agnosticism or atheism, while others have considered it to be distinct. An ignostic maintains that he cannot even say whether he is a theist or an atheist until a sufficient definition of theism is put forth.

The term "ignosticism" was coined in the 1960s by Sherwin Wine, a rabbi and a founding figure of Humanistic Judaism. The term "igtheism" was coined by the secular humanist Paul Kurtz in his 1992 book The New Skepticism.

== Philosophical issues ==
=== The problem of the supernatural ===
One problem posed by the question of the existence of God is that traditional beliefs usually ascribe to God various supernatural powers. Supernatural beings may be able to conceal and reveal themselves for their own purposes, as for example in the tale of Baucis and Philemon. In addition, according to concepts of God, God is not part of the natural order, but the ultimate creator of nature and of the scientific laws. Thus in Aristotelian philosophy, God is viewed as part of the explanatory structure needed to support scientific conclusions and any powers God possesses are—strictly speaking—of the natural order that is derived from God's place as originator of nature (see also Monadology).

In Karl Popper's philosophy of science, belief in a supernatural God is outside the natural domain of scientific investigation because all scientific hypotheses must be falsifiable in the natural world. The non-overlapping magisteria view proposed by Stephen Jay Gould also holds that the existence (or otherwise) of God is irrelevant to and beyond the domain of science.

Scientists follow the scientific method, within which theories must be verifiable by physical experiment. The majority of prominent conceptions of God explicitly or effectively posit a being whose existence is not testable either by proof or disproof. Therefore, the question of God's existence may lie outside the purview of modern science by definition. The Catholic Church maintains that knowledge of the existence of God is the "natural light of human reason". Fideists maintain that belief in God's existence may not be amenable to demonstration or refutation, but rests on faith alone.

Logical positivists such as Rudolf Carnap and A. J. Ayer viewed any talk of gods as literal nonsense. For the logical positivists and adherents of similar schools of thought, statements about religious or other transcendent experiences can not have a truth value, and are deemed to be without meaning, because such statements do not have any clear verification criteria. As the Christian biologist Scott C. Todd put it "Even if all the data pointed to an intelligent designer, such a hypothesis is excluded from science because it is not naturalistic." This argument limits the domain of science to the empirically observable and limits the domain of God to the empirically unprovable.

=== Nature of relevant proofs and arguments ===
John Polkinghorne suggests that the nearest analogy to the existence of God in physics is the ideas of quantum mechanics which are seemingly paradoxical but make sense of a great deal of disparate data.

Alvin Plantinga compares the question of the existence of God to the question of the existence of other minds, claiming both are notoriously impossible to "prove" against a determined skeptic.

One approach, suggested by writers such as Stephen D. Unwin, is to treat (particular versions of) theism and naturalism as though they were two hypotheses in the Bayesian sense, to list certain data (or alleged data), about the world, and to suggest that the likelihoods of these data are significantly higher under one hypothesis than the other. Most of the arguments for, or against, the existence of God can be seen as pointing to particular aspects of the universe in this way. In almost all cases it is not seriously suggested by proponents of the arguments that they are irrefutable, merely that they make one worldview seem significantly more likely than the other. However, since an assessment of the weight of evidence depends on the prior probability that is assigned to each worldview, arguments that a theist finds convincing may seem thin to an atheist and vice versa.

Philosophers, such as Wittgenstein, take a view that is considered anti-realist and oppose philosophical arguments related to God's existence. For instance, Charles Taylor contends that the real is whatever will not go away. If we cannot reduce talk about God to anything else, or replace it, or prove it false, then perhaps God is as real as anything else.

In George Berkeley's A Treatise Concerning the Principles of Human Knowledge of 1710, he argued that a "naked thought" cannot exist, and that a perception is a thought; therefore only minds can be proven to exist, since all else is merely an idea conveyed by a perception. From this Berkeley argued that the universe is based upon observation and is non-objective. However, he noted that the universe includes "ideas" not perceptible to humankind, and that there must, therefore, exist an omniscient superobserver, which perceives such things. Berkeley considered this proof of the existence of the Christian god.

=== Outside of Western thought ===
Existence in absolute truth is central to Vedanta epistemology. Traditional sense perception based approaches were put into question as possibly misleading due to preconceived or superimposed ideas. But though all object-cognition can be doubted, the existence of the doubter remains a fact even in nastika traditions of mayavada schools following Adi Shankara. The five eternal principles to be discussed under ontology, beginning with God or Isvara, the Ultimate Reality, cannot be established by the means of logic alone, and often require superior proof.

In Vaisnavism, Vishnu, or his intimate ontological form of Krishna, is equated to the personal absolute God of the Western traditions. Aspects of Krishna as svayam bhagavan in original Absolute Truth, sat chit ananda, are understood as originating from three essential attributes of Krishna's form, i.e., "eternal existence" or sat, related to the brahman aspect; "knowledge" or chit, to the paramatman; and "bliss" or ananda in Sanskrit, to bhagavan.

== Arguments for the existence of God ==
=== Logical arguments ===
==== Aquinas' Five Ways ====
In article 3, question 2, first part of his Summa Theologica, Thomas Aquinas developed his five arguments for God's existence. These arguments are grounded in an Aristotelian ontology and make use of the infinite regression argument. Aquinas did not intend to fully prove the existence of God as he is orthodoxly conceived (with all of his traditional attributes), but proposed his Five Ways as a first stage, which he built upon later in his work. Aquinas' Five Ways argued from the unmoved mover, first cause, necessary being, argument from degree, and the argument from final cause.

- The unmoved mover argument: things in the world are in motion, something can only be caused to move by a mover, therefore everything in the world must be moved by an unmoved mover.
- The first cause argument: things in the world have a cause, and nothing is the cause of itself, so everything in the world must have a first cause or an uncaused cause.
- The necessary being argument: things in the world are contingent, and contingent beings cannot exist without a cause, so everything in the world must be caused by a necessary being.
- The degree argument: there are degrees of goodness and perfection among things, and something of a maximum degree must be the cause of things of a lower degree, so there must be a supremely good and perfect cause for all good things.
- The final cause argument: things in the world act for an end or purpose, but only an intelligent being can direct itself towards a purpose, so there must be an intelligent being that directs things towards their purpose.

According to contemporary Catholic philosopher Edward Feser, underlying each of the Five Ways is a more fundamental argument, one that relies on a distinction between essence and existence. Put simply, essence is what a thing is, and existence is the fact that it exists. These properties must be distinct, because, as Feser argues, if you described a lion, a unicorn, and a pterodactyl to someone who hadn't heard of any of these animals, and then told them that one of them still exists, one has gone extinct, and another one never existed, there would be no way for them to know which is which. Therefore, the essence of these things must be distinct from their existence. But in fact, if there truly were something whose essence is not distinct from its existence, Feser writes, there could only be one of that thing, since for there to be multiple of such things would require them to be distinct based on some specific property, but since the essence of something whose essence is not distinct from its existence just is that it exists, this wouldn't make sense. This thing he calls "subsistent existence itself". Since everything that has an essence distinct from the fact that it exists depends for its existence on something else, which, if possessing an essence distinct from its existence must too get its existence from something else, everything must rely on the single, unique existence which is existence itself, and that existence is God.

==== Cosmological argument ====
The cosmological argument is an a posteriori argument for a cause or reason for the cosmos.

One type of cosmological, or "first cause" argument, typically called the Kalam cosmological argument, asserts that since everything that begins to exist has a cause, and the universe began to exist, the universe must have had a cause which was itself not caused. This ultimate first cause is identified with God. Christian apologist William Lane Craig gives a version of this argument in the following form:

1. Whatever begins to exist has a cause.
2. The Universe began to exist.
3. Therefore, the Universe had a cause.

Another type is the Leibnizian contingency argument, which rests on the principle of sufficient reason. In Leibniz’s words, “there can be no fact real or existing, no statement true, unless there be a sufficient reason, why it should be so and not otherwise.” Because the universe is contingent, no contingent thing inside it, and no series of contingent things, can supply the sufficient reason for the whole. That reason must lie in a necessary being that carries the reason for its own existence, and this being is identified with God.

==== Ontological argument ====
The ontological argument has been formulated by philosophers including St. Anselm and René Descartes. The argument proposes that God's existence is self-evident. The logic, depending on the formulation, reads roughly as follows:

Whatever is contained in a clear and distinct idea of a thing must be predicated of that thing; but a clear and distinct idea of an absolutely perfect Being contains the idea of actual existence; therefore since we have the idea of an absolutely perfect Being such a Being must really exist.

Thomas Aquinas criticized the argument for proposing a definition of God which, if God is transcendent, should be impossible for humans. Immanuel Kant criticized the proof from a logical standpoint: he stated that the term "God" really signifies two different terms: both idea of God, and God. Kant concluded that the proof is equivocation, based on the ambiguity of the word God. Kant also challenged the argument's assumption that existence is a predicate (of perfection) because it does not add anything to the essence of a being. If existence is not a predicate, then it is not necessarily true that the greatest possible being exists. A common rebuttal to Kant's critique is that, although "existence" does add something to both the concept and the reality of God, the concept would be vastly different if its referent is an unreal Being. Another response to Kant is attributed to Alvin Plantinga, who says that even if one were to grant that existence is not a real predicate, necessary existence, which is the correct formulation of an understanding of God, is a real predicate.

===== Gödel's ontological proof =====
Gödel's ontological proof is a formal argument by the mathematician Kurt Gödel (1906–1978) for the existence of God. The argument is in a line of development that goes back to Anselm of Canterbury (1033–1109). St. Anselm's ontological argument, in its most succinct form, is as follows: God, if He does exist, is that than which no greater can be conceived. God exists in the understanding. If God exists in the understanding, we could imagine Him to be greater by existing in reality. Therefore, God must exist. A more elaborate version was given by Gottfried Leibniz (1646–1716); this is the version that Gödel studied and attempted to clarify with his ontological argument.

The argument uses modal logic, which deals with statements about what is necessarily true or possibly true. From the axioms that a property can only be positive if not-having-it is not positive, and that properties implied by a positive property must all also be themselves positive, it concludes that (since positive properties do not involve contradiction) for any positive property, there is possibly a being that instantiates it. It defines God as the being instantiating all positive properties. After defining what it means for a property to be "the essence" of something (the one property that necessarily implies all its other properties), it concludes that God's instantiation of all positive properties must be the essence of God. After defining a property of "necessary existence" and taking it as an axiom that it is positive, the argument concludes that, since God must have this property, God must exist necessarily.

The proof uses modal logic, which distinguishes between necessary truths and contingent truths. In the most common semantics for modal logic, many "possible worlds" are considered. A truth is necessary if it is true in all possible worlds. By contrast, if a statement happens to be true in our world, but is false in another world, then it is a contingent truth. A statement that is true in some world (not necessarily our own) is called a possible truth.

Furthermore, the proof uses higher-order (modal) logic because the definition of God employs an explicit quantification over properties.

First, Gödel axiomatizes the notion of a "positive property": (Note: It assumes that it is possible to single out positive properties from among all properties. Gödel comments that "Positive means positive in the moral aesthetic sense (independently of the accidental structure of the world)... It may also mean pure attribution as opposed to privation (or containing privation)." (Gödel 1995), see also manuscript in (Gawlick 2012).) for each property φ, either φ or its negation ¬φ must be positive, but not both (axiom 2). If a positive property φ implies a property ψ in each possible world, then ψ is positive, too (axiom 1). (Note: As a profane example, if the property of being green is positive, that of not being red is, too (by axiom 1), hence that of being red is negative (by axiom 2). More generally, at most one color can be considered positive.) Gödel then argues that each positive property is "possibly exemplified", i.e. applies at least to some object in some world (theorem 1). Defining an object to be Godlike if it has all positive properties (definition 1), (Note: Continuing the color example, a godlike object must have the unique color that is considered positive, or no color at all; both alternatives may seem counter-intuitive.) and requiring that property to be positive itself (axiom 3), (Note: If one considers the partial order $\preceq$ defined by $\varphi \preceq \psi$ if $\square \forall y (\varphi(y) \to \psi(y))$, then Axioms 1-3 can be summarized by saying that positive properties form an ultrafilter on this ordering. Definition 1 and Axiom 4 are needed to establish the Godlike property as principal element of the ultrafilter.) Gödel shows that in some possible world a Godlike object exists (theorem 2), called "God" in the following. (Note: By removing all modal operators from axioms, definitions, proofs, and theorems, a modified version of theorem 2 is obtained saying "∃x G(x)", i.e. "There exists an object which has all positive, but no negative properties". Nothing more than axioms 1-3, definition 1, and theorems 1-2 needs to be considered for this result.) Gödel proceeds to prove that a Godlike object exists in every possible world.

===== Meinongian argument =====
The Meinongian argument is a type of ontological argument or an "a priori argument" that seeks to prove the existence of God. This is through an assertion that there is "a distinction between different categories of existence." The premise of the ontological argument is based on Alexius Meinong's works. Some scholars also associate it with St. Anselm's ontological argument.

===== Trademark argument =====
French philosopher and mathematician René Descartes, who formulated the trademark argument

The trademark argument is an a priori argument for the existence of God developed by the French philosopher and mathematician René Descartes. The name derives from the fact that the idea of God existing in each person "is the trademark, hallmark or stamp of their divine creator".

In the Meditations Descartes provides two arguments for the existence of God. In Meditation V he presents a version of the ontological argument which attempts to deduce the existence of God from the nature of God; in Meditation III he presents an argument for the existence of God from one of the effects of God's activity. Descartes cannot start with the existence of the world or with some feature of the world for, at this stage of his argument, he has not established that the world exists. Instead, he starts with the fact that he has an idea of God and concludes "that the mere fact that I exist and have within me an idea of a most perfect being, that is, God, provides a very clear proof that God indeed exists." He says, "it is no surprise that God, in creating me, should have placed this idea in me to be, as it were, the mark of the craftsman stamped on his work."

==== Plantinga's free-will defense ====
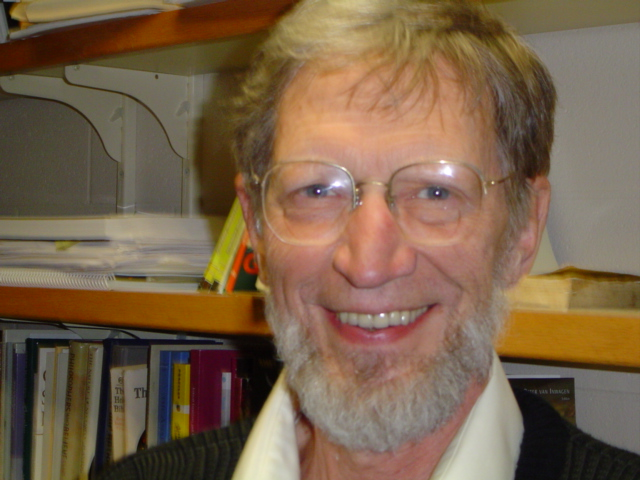
Alvin Plantinga in 2004

Alvin Plantinga's free-will defense is a logical argument developed by the American analytic philosopher Alvin Plantinga and published in its final version in his 1977 book God, Freedom, and Evil. Plantinga's argument is a defense against the logical problem of evil as formulated by the philosopher J. L. Mackie beginning in 1955. Mackie's formulation of the logical problem of evil argued that three attributes ascribed to God (omniscience, omnipotence, and omnibenevolence) are logically incompatible with the existence of evil.

Specifically, the argument from evil asserts that the following set of propositions are, by themselves, logically inconsistent or contradictory:

1. God is omniscient (all-knowing)
2. God is omnipotent (all-powerful)
3. God is omnibenevolent (morally perfect)
4. There is evil in the world

Plantinga's free-will defense begins by noting a distinction between moral evil and physical evil (Plantinga's defense primarily references moral evil), then asserting that Mackie's argument failed to establish an explicit logical contradiction between God and the existence of moral evil. In other words, Plantinga shows that (1–4) are not on their own contradictory, and that any contradiction must originate from an atheologian's implicit unstated assumptions, assumptions representing premises not stated in the argument itself. With an explicit contradiction ruled out, an atheologian must add premises to the argument for it to succeed. Nonetheless, if Plantinga had offered no further argument, then an atheologian's intuitive impressions that a contradiction must exist would have remained unanswered. Plantinga sought to resolve this by offering two further points.

First, Plantinga, using modal logic, pointed out that omnipotence is the power to do all things logically possible, and thus God could not be expected to do things that are logically impossible. God could not, for example, create square circles, act contrary to his nature, or, more relevantly, create beings with free will that would never choose evil. Taking this latter point further, Plantinga argued that the moral value of human free will is a credible offsetting justification that God could have as a morally justified reason for permitting the existence of evil. Plantinga did not claim to have shown that the conclusion of the logical problem is wrong, nor did he assert that God's reason for allowing evil is, in fact, to preserve free will. Instead, his argument sought only to show that the logical problem of evil was invalid.

Plantinga's defense has received strong support among academic philosophers, with many agreeing that it defeated the logical problem of evil. Contemporary atheologians have presented arguments claiming to have found the additional premises needed to create an explicitly contradictory theistic set by adding to the propositions 1–4.

==== Proof of the Truthful ====
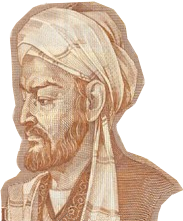
Avicenna, the proponent of the argument, depicted on a 1999 Tajikistani banknote

The Proof of the Truthful (Arabic: برهان الصديقين, romanized: burhān al-ṣiddīqīn, also translated Demonstration of the Truthful or Proof of the Veracious, among others) is a formal argument for proving the existence of God introduced by the Islamic philosopher Avicenna (also known as Ibn Sina, 980–1037). Avicenna argued that there must be a "necessary existent" (Arabic: واجب الوجود, romanized: wājib al-wujūd), an entity that cannot not exist. The argument says that the entire set of contingent things must have a cause that is not contingent because otherwise it would be included in the set. Furthermore, through a series of arguments, he derived that the necessary existent must have attributes that he identified with God in Islam, including unity, simplicity, immateriality, intellect, power, generosity, and goodness.

Historian of philosophy Peter Adamson called the argument one of the most influential medieval arguments for God's existence, and Avicenna's biggest contribution to the history of philosophy. It was enthusiastically received and repeated (sometimes with modification) by later philosophers, including generations of Muslim philosophers, Western Christian philosophers such as Thomas Aquinas and Duns Scotus, and Jewish philosophers such as Maimonides.

Critics of the argument include Averroes, who objected to its methodology, Al-Ghazali, who disagreed with its characterization of God, and modern critics who state that its piecemeal derivation of God's attributes allows people to accept parts of the argument but still reject God's existence. There is no consensus among modern scholars on the classification of the argument; some say that it is ontological while others say it is cosmological.

=== Empirical arguments ===
==== Argument from beauty ====
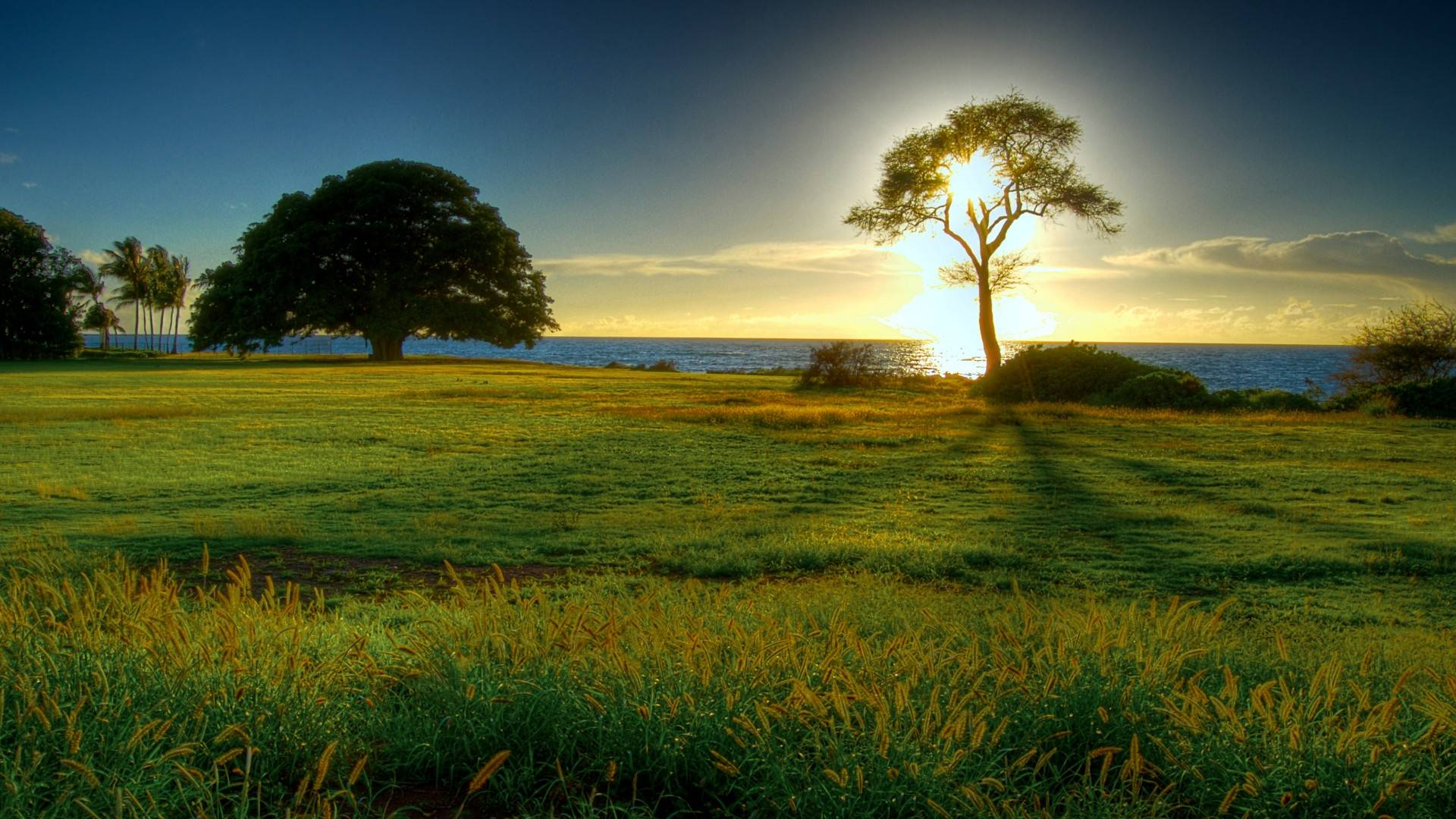
A field in Kosovo

The argument from beauty (also the aesthetic argument) is an argument for the existence of a realm of immaterial ideas or, most commonly, for the existence of God, that roughly states that the evident beauty in nature, art and music and even in more abstract areas like the elegance of the laws of physics or the elegant laws of mathematics is evidence of a creator deity who has arranged these things to be beautiful (aesthetically pleasing, or "good") and not ugly.

Plato argued there is a transcendent plane of abstract ideas, or universals, which are more perfect than real-world examples of those ideas. Later philosophers connected this plane to the idea of goodness, beauty, and then the Christian God.

Various observers have also argued that the experience of beauty is evidence of the existence of a universal God. Depending on the observer, this might include artificially beautiful things like music or art, natural beauty like landscapes or astronomical bodies, or the elegance of abstract ideas like the laws of mathematics or physics.

==== Argument from consciousness ====
The argument from consciousness is an argument for the existence of God that claims characteristics of human consciousness (such as qualia) cannot be explained by the physical mechanisms of the human body and brain, therefore asserting that there must be non-physical aspects to human consciousness. This is held as indirect evidence of God, given that notions about souls and the afterlife in Judaism, Christianity, and Islam would be consistent with such a claim.

The best-known defender of the argument from consciousness is J. P. Moreland.

==== Argument from design ====
The teleological argument (from τέλος, telos, 'end, aim, goal'), also known as the physico-theological argument, argument from design, or intelligent design argument, is a rational argument for the existence of God or, more generally, that complex functionality in the natural world, which looks designed, is evidence of an intelligent creator. The earliest recorded versions of this argument are associated with Socrates in ancient Greece, although it has been argued that he was taking up an older argument. Later, Plato and Aristotle developed complex approaches to the proposal that the cosmos has an intelligent cause, but it was the Stoics during the Roman era who, under their influence, "developed the battery of creationist arguments broadly known under the label 'The Argument from Design'".

Since the Roman era, various versions of the teleological argument have been associated with the Abrahamic religions. In the Middle Ages, Islamic theologians such as Al-Ghazali used the argument, although it was rejected as unnecessary by Quranic literalists, and as unconvincing by many Islamic philosophers. Later, the teleological argument was accepted by Saint Thomas Aquinas, and included as the fifth of his "Five Ways" of proving the existence of God. In early modern England, clergymen such as William Turner and John Ray were well-known proponents. In the early 18th century, William Derham published his Physico-Theology, which gave his "demonstration of the being and attributes of God from his works of creation". Later, William Paley, in his 1802 Natural Theology or Evidences of the Existence and Attributes of the Deity published a prominent presentation of the design argument with his version of the watchmaker analogy and the first use of the phrase "argument from design".

From its beginning, there have been numerous criticisms of the different versions of the teleological argument. Some have been written as responses to criticisms of non-teleological natural science which are associated with it. Especially important were the general logical arguments presented by David Hume in his Dialogues Concerning Natural Religion, published in 1779, and the explanation of biological complexity given in Charles Darwin's Origin of Species, published in 1859. Since the 1960s, Paley's arguments have been influential in the development of a creation science movement which used phrases such as "design by an intelligent designer", and after 1987 this was rebranded as "intelligent design", promoted by the intelligent design movement which refers to an intelligent designer. Both movements have used the teleological argument to argue against the modern scientific understanding of evolution, and to claim that supernatural explanations should be given equal validity in the public school science curriculum.

Starting already in classical Greece, two approaches to the teleological argument developed, distinguished by their understanding of whether the natural order was literally created or not. The non-creationist approach starts most clearly with Aristotle, although many thinkers, such as the Neoplatonists, believed it was already intended by Plato. This approach is not creationist in a simple sense, because while it agrees that a cosmic intelligence is responsible for the natural order, it rejects the proposal that this requires a "creator" to physically make and maintain this order. The Neoplatonists did not find the teleological argument convincing, and in this they were followed by medieval philosophers such as Al-Farabi and Avicenna. Later, Averroes and Thomas Aquinas considered the argument acceptable, but not necessarily the best argument.

While the concept of an intelligence behind the natural order is ancient, a rational argument that concludes that we can know that the natural world has a designer, or a creating intelligence which has human-like purposes, appears to have begun with classical philosophy. Some of the modern arguments utilize findings from theory of relativity, quantum mechanics, the Big Bang, the theories of expansion, heat death, and fine-tuning of the universe. Religious thinkers in Judaism, Hinduism, Confucianism, Islam and Christianity also developed versions of the teleological argument. Later, variants on the argument from design were produced in Western philosophy and by Christian fundamentalism. Contemporary defenders of the teleological argument are mainly Christians, for example Richard Swinburne and John Lennox.

==== Argument from natural laws ====
The argument from natural laws (promoted by Isaac Newton, René Descartes, and Robert Boyle) holds that the existence of God is evident by the observation of governing laws and existing order in the Universe.

==== Argument from psychedelics ====
Human subjects in scientific studies have reported that psychedelic drugs such as LSD, mescaline, psilocybin mushrooms, and DMT provide perceptions of a transcendent reality, including encounters with God. Since prehistory, cultures around the world have used entheogens for the purpose of enabling mystical experiences. In The Doors of Perception, English philosopher and writer Aldous Huxley recounts his mystical experiences while he was under the influence of mescaline, arguing that the human brain normally filters reality, and that such drugs remove this filter, exposing humans to a broader spectrum of conscious awareness which he calls the "Mind at Large".

==== Argument from sensus divinitatis ====
The argument from sensus divinitatis (Latin for 'sense of divinity') posits that humans are born with an innate sense, or cognitive mechanism, that grants them awareness of God's presence. Alvin Plantinga argues that if beliefs formed by sensory experience can be considered properly basic, requiring no external justification, then beliefs in theism formed by a sensus divinitatis can be considered properly basic as well, and thus require no external justification. Research in the cognitive science of religion suggests that the human brain has a natural and evolutionary predisposition towards theistic beliefs, which Kelly James Clark argues is empirical evidence for the presence of a sensus divinitatis.

==== Rational warrant ====
Philosopher Stephen Toulmin is notable for his work in the history of ideas that features the (rational) warrant: a statement that connects the premises to a conclusion.

Joseph Hinman applied Toulmin's approach in his argument for the existence of God, particularly in his book The Trace of God: A Rational Warrant for Belief. Instead of attempting to prove the existence of God, Hinman argues you can "demonstrate the rationally-warranted nature of belief".

Hinman uses a wide range of studies, including ones by Robert Wuthnow, Andrew Greeley, Mathes and Kathleen Nobel to establish that mystical experiences are life-transformative in a way that is significant, positive and lasting. He draws on additional work to add several additional major points to his argument. First, the people who have these experiences not only do not exhibit traditional signs of mental illness but, often, are in better mental and physical health than the general population due to the experience. Second, the experiences work. In other words, they provide a framework for navigating life that is useful and effective. All of the evidence of the positive effects of the experience upon people's lives he, adapting a term from Derrida, terms "the trace of God": the footprints left behind that point to the impact.

Finally, he discusses how both religious experience and belief in God is, and has always been, normative among humans: people do not need to prove the existence of God. If there is no need to prove, Hinman argues, and the Trace of God (for instance, the impact of mystical experiences on them), belief in God is rationally warranted.

=== Inductive arguments ===
Some have put forward arguments for the existence of God based on inductive reasoning. For example, one class of philosophers asserts that the proofs for the existence of God present a fairly large probability though not absolute certainty. A number of obscure points, they say, always remain; an act of faith is required to dismiss these difficulties. This view is maintained, among others, by the Scottish statesman Arthur Balfour in his book The Foundations of Belief (1895). The opinions set forth in this work were adopted in France by Ferdinand Brunetière, the editor of the Revue des deux Mondes. Many orthodox Protestants express themselves in the same manner, as, for instance, Dr. E. Dennert, President of the Kepler Society, in his work Ist Gott tot?

=== Metaphysical arguments ===
==== Argument from degree ====
The argument from degrees, also known as the degrees of perfection argument or the henological argument, is an argument for the existence of God first proposed by mediaeval Roman Catholic theologian Thomas Aquinas as one of the five ways to philosophically argue in favour of God's existence in his Summa Theologica. It is based on ontological and theological notions of perfection. Contemporary Thomist scholars are often in disagreement on the metaphysical justification for this proof. According to Edward Feser, the metaphysics involved in the argument has more to do with Aristotle than Plato; hence, while the argument presupposes realism about universals and abstract objects, it would be more accurate to say Aquinas is thinking of Aristotelian realism and not Platonic realism per se. The argument has received several criticisms, including the subjective notion of some qualities such as goodness, perfection or beauty; or the alleged non sequitur assertion that something should necessarily have all properties to the maximum possible degree given a set of entities with those properties.

==== Argument from desire ====
The argument from desire is an argument for the existence of the immortality of the soul. The best-known defender of the argument is the Christian writer C. S. Lewis. Briefly and roughly, the argument states that humans' natural desire for eternal happiness must be capable of satisfaction, because all natural desires are capable of satisfaction. Versions of the argument have been offered since the Middle Ages, and the argument continues to have defenders today, such as Peter Kreeft and Francis Collins.

C. S. Lewis, in Mere Christianity and elsewhere, posed that all natural desires have a natural object. One thirsts, and there exists water to quench this thirst; One hungers, and there exists food to satisfy this hunger. He then argued that the human desire for perfect justice, perfect peace, perfect happiness, and other intangibles strongly implies the existence of such things, though they seem unobtainable on earth. He further posed that the unquenchable desires of this life strongly imply that we are intended for a different life, necessarily governed by a God who can provide the desired intangibles.

==== Argument from love ====
The argument from love is an argument for the existence of God that suggests the depth, complexity, and universality of love point to a transcendent source or purpose.

==== Argument from mathematics ====
The argument from mathematics is presented by American philosopher William Lane Craig. In the philosophy of mathematics, the ontological status of mathematical entities, such as numbers, sets, and functions is debated. Within this philosophical context, two primary positions emerge: mathematical realism and mathematical anti-realism. Realists argue that mathematical objects exist independently of human thought as abstract, non-causal entities. In contrast, anti-realists deny the independent existence of these mathematical objects. A pivotal issue in this debate is the phenomenon that physicist Eugene Wigner termed "the unreasonable effectiveness of mathematics". This refers to the ability of mathematics to describe and predict phenomena in the natural world, exemplified by theoretical physicist Peter Higgs' use of mathematical equations to predict the existence of a fundamental particle, which was verified experimentally decades later.

Craig posits that this effectiveness presents a significant philosophical question about the applicability of mathematics, regardless of one's stance on the existence of mathematical entities. He argues that theism provides a more compelling framework for understanding this phenomenon than metaphysical naturalism. Under realism, non-theistic perspectives might view the alignment of mathematical abstractions with physical reality as a mere coincidence. However, a theistic realist might argue that this alignment is intentional, as a Supreme Being created the world based on these abstract mathematical structures. On the other hand, anti-realists, particularly those of a naturalistic persuasion, see mathematical relationships as reflections of real-world interactions, without necessitating abstract entities. Yet, Craig challenges this view by questioning why the physical world inherently exhibits such complex mathematical patterns without an intentional design. In contrast, the theistic anti-realist has a straightforward explanation: the world reflects a complex mathematical structure because it was created by God following an abstract model. Thus, Craig concludes that theism offers a superior explanation for why mathematics applies so effectively to understanding and predicting the physical world.

==== Argument from morality ====
The argument from morality is an argument for the existence of God. Arguments from morality tend to be based on moral normativity or moral order. Arguments from moral normativity observe some aspect of morality and argue that God is the best or only explanation for this, concluding that God must exist. Arguments from moral order are based on the asserted need for moral order to exist in the universe. They claim that, for this moral order to exist, God must exist to support it. The argument from morality is noteworthy in that one cannot evaluate the soundness of the argument without attending to almost every important philosophical issue in meta-ethics.

German philosopher Immanuel Kant devised an argument from morality based on practical reason. Kant argued that the goal of humanity is to achieve perfect happiness and virtue (the summum bonum) and believed that an afterlife must be assumed to exist in order for this to be possible, and that God must be assumed to exist to provide this. Rather than aiming to prove the existence of God, however, Kant was simply attempting to demonstrate that all moral thought requires the assumption that God exists, and therefore that we are entitled to make such an assumption only as a regulative principle rather than a constitutive principle (meaning that such a principle can guide our actions, but it does not provide knowledge). In his book Mere Christianity, C. S. Lewis argued that "conscience reveals to us a moral law whose source cannot be found in the natural world, thus pointing to a supernatural Lawgiver." Lewis argued that accepting the validity of human reason as a given must include accepting the validity of practical reason, which could not be valid without reference to a higher cosmic moral order which could not exist without a God to create and/or establish it. A related argument is from conscience; John Henry Newman argued that the conscience supports the claim that objective moral truths exist because it drives people to act morally even when it is not in their own interest. Newman argued that, because the conscience suggests the existence of objective moral truths, God must exist to give authority to these truths.

Contemporary defenders of the argument from morality are Graham Ward, Alister McGrath and William Lane Craig.

==== Argument from reason ====
The argument from reason is a transcendental argument against metaphysical naturalism and for the existence of God (or at least a supernatural being that is the source of human reason). The best-known defender of the argument is C. S. Lewis. Lewis first defended the argument at length in his 1947 book, Miracles: A Preliminary Study. In the second edition of Miracles (1960), Lewis substantially revised and expanded the argument.

Contemporary defenders of the argument from reason include Alvin Plantinga, Victor Reppert and William Hasker.

Metaphysical naturalism is the view that nature as studied by the natural sciences is all that exists. Naturalists deny the existence of supernatural deities, souls, an afterlife, or anything supernatural. Naturalists believe nothing exists outside or beyond the physical universe.

The argument from reason seeks to show that naturalism is self-refuting, or otherwise false and indefensible.

According to Lewis,

One absolutely central inconsistency ruins [the naturalistic worldview].... The whole picture professes to depend on inferences from observed facts. Unless inference is valid, the whole picture disappears.... [U]nless Reason is an absolute--all is in ruins. Yet those who ask me to believe this world picture also ask me to believe that Reason is simply the unforeseen and unintended by-product of mindless matter at one stage of its endless and aimless becoming. Here is flat contradiction. They ask me at the same moment to accept a conclusion and to discredit the only testimony on which that conclusion can be based.

— C. S. Lewis, "Is Theology Poetry?", The Weight of Glory and Other Addresses

In some versions of the argument from reason, Lewis extends the argument to defend a further conclusion: that human reason depends on an eternal, self-existent rational Being (God). This extension of the argument from reason states:

1. Since everything in nature can be wholly explained in terms of nonrational causes, human reason (more precisely, the power of drawing conclusions based solely on the rational cause of logical insight) must have a source outside of nature
2. If human reason came from non-reason it would lose all rational credentials and would cease to be reason.
3. So, human reason cannot come from non-reason (from 2).
4. So human reason must come from a source outside nature that is itself rational (from 1 and 3).
5. This supernatural source of reason may itself be dependent on some further source of reason, but a chain of such dependent sources cannot go on forever. Eventually, we must reason back to the existence of an eternal, non-dependent source of human reason.
6. Therefore, there exists an eternal, self-existent, rational Being who is the ultimate source of human reason. This Being we call God (from 4-5). (Lewis, Miracles, chap. 4)

==== Transcendental argument ====
The Transcendental Argument for the existence of God (TAG) is a transcendental argument that attempts to prove the existence of God. (Note: Note that "transcendental" in this case is used as an adjective specifying a specific kind of argument, and not a noun. Transcendental arguments should not be confused with arguments for the existence of something transcendent or conceptual.)

Several distinct arguments are supposed transcendental arguments for God:

1) A version was formulated by Immanuel Kant in his 1763 work The Only Possible Argument in Support of a Demonstration of the Existence of God and the Critique of Practical Reason. For Kant, morality is best explained by the existence of God.

2) C. S. Lewis's argument from reason is also a kind of transcendental argument.

3) The term is also used by Christian presuppositional apologetics and the likes of Cornelius Van Til and Greg Bahnsen, which attempt to appeal to God as the necessary condition for the possibility of experience and knowledge.

=== Subjective arguments ===
==== Argument from religious experience ====
The argument from religious experience holds that the best explanation for religious experiences is that they are actual perceptions of God's presence. Philosopher Robert Sloan Lee notes that this argument possesses an "unexpected resilience" despite seemingly being able to be easily defeated by simple objections, such as pointing out the existence of hallucinations. Philosopher William J. Abraham states "We do not generally believe that because some reports of ordinary natural objects sometimes involve illusion, hallucination, and the like, then all reports do so." He continues, "If we insist that they apply only to religious experience, then we face the embarrassing fact that we apply standards in the religious sphere which we do not apply elsewhere."

==== Arguments from witnesses' testimony ====
Arguments from testimony rely on the testimony or experience of witnesses, possibly embodying the propositions of a specific revealed religion. Swinburne argues that it is a principle of rationality that one should accept testimony unless there are strong reasons for not doing so.

- The witness argument gives credibility to personal witnesses, contemporary and throughout the ages. A variation of this is the argument from miracles (also referred to as "the priest stories") which relies on testimony of supernatural events to establish the existence of God.
- The majority argument argues that the theism of people throughout most of recorded history and in many different places provides prima facie demonstration of God's existence.
- Islam asserts that the revelation of its holy book, the Qur'an, and its unique literary attributes, vindicate its divine authorship, and thus the existence of God.
- The Church of Jesus Christ of Latter-day Saints, also known as Mormonism, similarly asserts that the miraculous appearance of God, Jesus Christ, and angels to Joseph Smith and others and subsequent finding and translation of the Book of Mormon establishes the existence of God. The whole Latter Day Saint movement makes the same claim for example Community of Christ, Church of Christ (Temple Lot), Church of Jesus Christ (Bickertonite), Church of Jesus Christ of Latter Day Saints (Strangite), Church of Jesus Christ (Cutlerite), etc.
  - The Church of Jesus Christ of Latter Day Saints (Strangite), similarly asserts that the finding and translation of the Plates of Laban, also known as the Brass Plates, into the Book of the Law of the Lord and Voree plates by James Strang, One Mighty and Strong, establishes the existence of God.
  - Various sects that have broken from the Church of Christ (Temple Lot) (such as Church of Christ "With the Elijah Message" and Church of Christ (Assured Way)) claim that the message brought by John the Baptist, One Mighty and Strong, to Otto Fetting and W. A. Draves in The Word of the Lord Brought to Mankind by an Angel establishes the existence of God.

===== Arguments from historical events =====
- Christianity and Judaism assert that God intervened in key specific moments in history, especially at the Exodus and the giving of the Ten Commandments in front of all the tribes of Israel, positing an argument from empirical evidence stemming from sheer number of witnesses, thus demonstrating his existence; this is also known as the Kuzari argument.
- Christological arguments assert that certain events of the Christian New Testament are historically accurate, and prove God's existence, namely:
  - The Resurrection of Jesus (an argument from miracles)

===== Arguments from the authority of historical personages =====
These arguments are an appeal to authority:

- The claims of Jesus, as a morally upstanding person, to be the son of God
- Jesus, said to be a wise person, believed that God exists
- The belief of Lekhraj Kripalani, who founded the Brahma Kumaris religion when God was said to enter his body

==== Anecdotal arguments ====
- The sincere seeker's argument, espoused by Muslim Sufis of the Tasawwuf tradition, posits that every individual who follows a formulaic path towards guidance, arrives at the same destination of conviction in the existence of God and specifically in the monotheistic tenets and laws of Islam. This apparent natural law for guidance and belief could only be consistent if the formula and supplication were being answered by the same Divine entity being addressed, as claimed in Islamic revelations. This was formally organized by Imam Abu Hamid Al-Ghazali in such notable works as "Deliverance from Error" and "The Alchemy of Happiness", in Arabic "Kimiya-yi sa'ādat". The path includes following the golden rule of no harm to others and treating others with compassion, silence or minimal speech, seclusion, daily fasting or minimalist diet of water and basic nourishment, honest wages, and daily supplication towards "the Creator of the Universe" for guidance.
- The Argument from a proper basis argues that belief in God is "properly basic"; that it is similar to statements like "I see a chair" or "I feel pain". Such beliefs are non-falsifiable and, thus, neither provable nor disprovable; they concern perceptual beliefs or indisputable mental states.
- In Germany, the School of Friedrich Heinrich Jacobi taught that human reason is able to perceive the suprasensible. Jacobi distinguished three faculties: sense, reason, and understanding. Just as sense has immediate perception of the material so has reason immediate perception of the immaterial, while the understanding brings these perceptions to a person's consciousness and unites them to one another. God's existence, then, cannot be proven (Jacobi, like Immanuel Kant, rejected the absolute value of the principle of causality), it must be felt by the mind.
- The same theory was advocated in Germany by Friedrich Schleiermacher, who assumed an inner religious sense by means of which people feel religious truths. According to Schleiermacher, religion consists solely in this inner perception, and dogmatic doctrines are inessential.

=== Hindu arguments ===
The school of Vedanta argues that one of the proofs of the existence of God is the law of karma. In a commentary to Brahma Sutras (III, 2, 38, and 41), Adi Sankara argues that the original karmic actions themselves cannot bring about the proper results at some future time; neither can super sensuous, non-intelligent qualities like adrsta by themselves mediate the appropriate, justly deserved pleasure and pain. The fruits, according to him must be administered through the action of a conscious agent, namely, a supreme being (Ishvara). The Nyaya school make similar arguments.

=== Other arguments ===
- The evolutionary argument against naturalism, which argues that naturalistic evolution is incapable of providing humans with the cognitive apparatus necessary for their knowledge to have positive epistemic status.
- An argument from belief in God being properly basic, as presented by Alvin Plantinga.
- Argument from personal identity.
- Argument from the "divine attributes of scientific law".

== Arguments against the existence of God ==
The arguments below aim to show that God does not exist—by showing a creator is unnecessary or contradictory, at odds with known scientific or historical facts, or that there is insufficient proof that God exists.

=== Logical/scientific arguments ===
The following arguments deduce (some using science), mostly through self-contradiction, the non-existence of God as "the Creator".

- No scientific evidence of God's existence has been found, or can ever be found. Therefore, according to scientific skeptic or scientist worldviews, one should not believe in God; more philosophically, whether or not God exists is unknown, or even, God does not exist (depending on how strongly such worldviews are held; or, depending on how strongly one believes that there is no scientific evidence of God's existence). (See also: scientific atheism).
- Stephen Hawking and co-author Leonard Mlodinow state in their book The Grand Design that it is reasonable to ask who or what created the universe, but if the answer is God, then the question has merely been deflected to that of who created God. Both authors claim that it is possible to answer these questions purely within the realm of science, and without invoking any divine beings. Christian scholars, like Leonhard Euler and Bernard d'Espagnat, disagree with that kind of skeptical argument.
- Dawkins' Ultimate Boeing 747 gambit analogizes the above. Some theists argue that evolution and abiogenesis are akin to a hurricane assembling a Boeing 747—that the universe (or life) is too complex, cannot be made by non-living matter alone and would have to be designed by someone, who theists call God. Dawkin's counter-argument is that such a God would himself be complex—the "Ultimate" Boeing 747—and therefore require a designer.
- Theological noncognitivism is the argument that religious language – specifically, words such as "God" – are not cognitively meaningful and that irreducible definitions of God are circular.
- The analogy of Russell's teapot argues that the burden of proof for the existence of God lies with the theist rather than the atheist; it can be considered an extension of Occam's Razor.

==== Arguments from incompatible divine properties ====
Some arguments focus on the existence of specific conceptions of God as being omniscient, omnipotent, and omnibenevolent.

The omnipotence paradox

The omnipotence paradox is a philosophical problem that challenges the idea of an all-powerful God. The paradox argues that if God is truly omnipotent, then he should be able to do anything, including things that are logically impossible. However, if God cannot do something that is logically impossible, then he is not truly omnipotent. This paradox has been debated by philosophers for centuries and continues to be a topic of discussion in modern times.

The basic form of the omnipotence paradox can be presented as follows: Can God create a stone so heavy that he cannot lift it? If God can create such a stone, then he is not omnipotent because he cannot lift it. If God cannot create such a stone, then he is also not omnipotent because there is something he cannot do.

One of the earliest recorded discussions of the omnipotence paradox can be found in the writings of the ancient Greek philosopher Epicurus. In his work "Letter to Menoeceus", Epicurus argues that if God is truly omnipotent, then he should be able to prevent evil from existing in the world. However, since evil does exist, either God is not omnipotent or he is not benevolent.

Another version of the omnipotence paradox involves God's ability to change the past. If God is truly omnipotent, then he should be able to change events that have already occurred. But if he can change the past, then he would be altering his own actions and decisions, which would mean that he was not truly free to act in the first place.

Another early discussion of the omnipotence paradox can be found in the writings of the medieval philosopher St. Thomas Aquinas. Aquinas argued that God's omnipotence was limited by his own nature and by logical laws. He believed that God could not perform actions that were logically contradictory, such as creating a square circle or making 2+2=5.

One of the most famous versions of this paradox is the question: "Can God create a being more powerful than himself?" This question implies a contradiction because if God is truly omnipotent, then he should be able to create anything, including a being more powerful than himself. However, if such a being exists, then God would no longer be omnipotent.

The omniscience paradox

The omniscience paradox or argument from free will challenges the idea that God can know everything that will happen in the future. If God knows everything that will happen in advance, then it seems that human beings do not have free will. After all, if God already knows what we will do in every situation, then it seems that we cannot choose to do anything differently.

Another version of the omniscience paradox involves God's knowledge of his own future actions. If God knows what he will do in advance, then it seems that he does not have the freedom to choose otherwise. But if he does not know what he will do, then he is not truly omniscient.

A more recent version of the omniscience paradox is the "paradox of the stone tablet". This argument goes as follows: suppose that God writes down everything that will happen in the future on a stone tablet. If God is truly omniscient, then he already knows what is written on the tablet. But if what is written on the tablet is true, then it seems that human beings do not have free will.

The contradiction of omniscience and omnipotence

The contradiction of omniscience and omnipotence has been a topic of philosophical debate for centuries. The concept of omniscience refers to the idea that God knows everything, while omnipotence refers to the idea that God is all-powerful. The contradiction arises when one considers whether an all-knowing God can also be all-powerful. If God knows everything, then he must know what he will do in the future, and if he knows what he will do in the future, then he cannot change his mind and do something else. This would mean that God is not all-powerful because he is limited by his knowledge of the future. On the other hand, if God is all-powerful, then he should be able to change his mind and do something else, but if he does this, then he cannot be all-knowing because he did not know what he was going to do in the first place.

The problem of divine immutability

The problem of divine immutability is a philosophical and theological issue that has been debated for centuries. At the heart of the problem is the question of whether or not God can change. This question has far-reaching implications for how we understand the nature of God, the relationship between God and creation, and the problem of evil.

One of the main arguments for divine immutability is based on the idea that God is perfect and complete in all respects. According to this view, if God were to change in any way, it would imply that there was something lacking or imperfect in God's nature. This would be inconsistent with the idea of a perfect and complete being.

Another argument for divine immutability is based on the idea that God exists outside of time. According to this view, God's nature is eternal and unchanging, and therefore cannot be affected by anything that happens within time. This means that God cannot change in response to events in the world, since these events are themselves temporal and subject to change.

However, there are also a number of arguments against divine immutability. One of these is based on the idea that if God cannot change, then it would be impossible for God to interact with the world in any meaningful way. According to this view, if God's nature is fixed and unchanging, then there can be no real relationship between God and creation.

Another argument against divine immutability is based on the problem of evil. If God cannot change, then it would seem that God must have always known about and allowed for the existence of evil in the world. This raises questions about how we can reconcile a perfectly good and loving God with a world that contains so much suffering and injustice.

The problem of evil

The problem of evil against God is one of the most challenging philosophical and theological issues. It seeks to reconcile the existence of an all-powerful, all-knowing, and benevolent God with the presence of evil and suffering in the world. This problem has been debated for centuries by philosophers, theologians, and scholars from different religious traditions.

The problem of evil can be formulated in different ways. One common formulation is the logical problem of evil, which argues that the existence of evil is logically incompatible with the existence of an all-powerful, all-knowing, and perfectly good God. This argument goes as follows:

1. Suppose God is defined by the properties of being all-powerful, all-knowing, and perfectly good.

2. If God is all-powerful, then he can prevent evil from occurring.

3. If God is all-knowing, then he knows where evil exists and knows how to eliminate evil.

4. If God is perfectly good, then he would want to prevent evil from occurring.

5. Evil exists.

6. Therefore, God does not exist.

This argument challenges the traditional concept of God as an omnipotent and omnibenevolent being who created the world and governs it with love and care. If such a God exists, why does he allow evil to happen? The existence of natural disasters, diseases, wars, crimes, and other forms of suffering seems to contradict the idea of a loving and compassionate God.

Another formulation of the problem of evil is the evidential problem of evil, which argues that while the existence of evil may not logically disprove the existence of God, it provides strong evidence against his existence. This argument acknowledges that it is possible for an all-powerful and all-good God to have reasons for allowing evil to occur that are beyond our understanding. However, it contends that the sheer amount and intensity of evil in the world make it highly unlikely that such reasons exist.

The problem of hell

This is one of the most difficult challenges to the existence of God. The basic argument is that if God is all-powerful, all-knowing, and perfectly good, then why would he create a place of eternal punishment like hell? This question has been debated by philosophers and theologians for centuries.

The problem of hell can be traced to ancient times. The concept of an afterlife was common in many cultures, but the idea of eternal punishment was not. The ancient Greeks believed in a realm called Hades where the dead went, but it was not a place of punishment. The ancient Egyptians believed in a judgment after death that determined whether a person would go to a good or bad afterlife, but again, it was not eternal punishment. It was not until the rise of Christianity that the concept of eternal punishment in hell became widespread.

The Christian concept of hell is based on the teachings of Jesus Christ and the Bible. According to Christian theology, hell is a place of eternal punishment for those who have rejected God and lived sinful lives. It is often described as a place of fire and torment where there is weeping and gnashing of teeth. The idea of eternal punishment in hell has been controversial throughout Christian history.

One argument against the existence of God based on the problem of hell is that it seems incompatible with God's perfect goodness. If God is perfectly good, then why would he create a place like hell where people suffer for eternity? This argument has been made by many philosophers throughout history.

Transcendental Argument for the Non-existence of God (TANG)

The Transcendental Argument for the Non-Existence of God (TANG) is a philosophical argument that attempts to demonstrate the non-existence of God by showing that the concept of God is logically incompatible with certain necessary conditions for rationality. The argument is based on the idea that if certain necessary conditions for rationality are true, then the existence of God is impossible. The proponents of TANG argue that it is a powerful argument against theism, and it has been the subject of much debate in philosophical circles.

The basic structure of TANG can be summarized as follows:

1. If rationality exists, then certain necessary conditions for rationality must be true.

2. The existence of God is logically incompatible with these necessary conditions for rationality.

3. Therefore, if these necessary conditions for rationality are true, then the existence of God is impossible.

The proponents of TANG argue that there are three necessary conditions for rationality:

1. The laws of logic are valid.

2. Our cognitive faculties are reliable.

3. There is an objective moral standard.

According to TANG, if these three necessary conditions are true, then the existence of God is impossible.

Firstly, proponents of TANG argue that the laws of logic are valid and necessary for rationality. They contend that if the laws of logic were not valid, then we could not reason or make sense of anything. Therefore, they argue that it is necessary for rationality that the laws of logic be valid and universally applicable.

Secondly, proponents of TANG argue that our cognitive faculties must be reliable in order for us to reason rationally. They contend that if our cognitive faculties were not reliable, then we could not trust our own reasoning processes and would have no basis for knowledge or belief. Therefore, they argue that it is necessary for rationality that our cognitive faculties be reliable.

Finally, proponents of TANG argue that there must be an objective moral standard in order for us to reason rationally. They contend that if there were no objective moral standard, then we could not make moral judgments or reason about ethical issues. Therefore, they argue that it is necessary for rationality that there be an objective moral standard.

Proponents of TANG argue that the existence of God is logically incompatible with these necessary conditions for rationality. They contend that if God exists, then the laws of logic are contingent on his will and could be different from what they are. They also argue that if God exists, then our cognitive faculties are contingent on his will and could be unreliable. Finally, they argue that if God exists, then morality is contingent on his will and there is no objective moral standard.

Therefore, proponents of TANG conclude that if these necessary conditions for rationality are true, then the existence of God is impossible. They argue that the concept of God is logically incompatible with these necessary conditions and therefore cannot exist.

Atheist-Existential Argument

The atheist-existential argument posits that human existence is characterized by absurdity, meaninglessness, and despair. According to this argument, humans are finite beings living in an infinite universe, and their existence is devoid of any inherent purpose or meaning. Proponents of this argument contend that if God existed, he would have provided humanity with a clear purpose and meaning for existence. However, since no such purpose or meaning exists, it follows that God does not exist.

Jean-Paul Sartre was one of the most prominent proponents of the atheist-existential argument. In his book Existentialism is a Humanism, Sartre argues that human existence is absurd because there is no inherent purpose or meaning to life. He contends that humans are free to create their own meaning and purpose but are ultimately responsible for their choices and actions. Sartre asserts that if God existed, he would have provided humanity with a clear purpose and meaning for existence. However, since no such purpose or meaning exists, it follows that God does not exist.

Similarly, Friedrich Nietzsche argues in his book Thus Spoke Zarathustra that human existence is meaningless because there is no inherent purpose or meaning to life. Nietzsche contends that humans must create their own values and meanings, and that the concept of God is a human invention that serves as a crutch for those who cannot accept the absurdity of existence. Nietzsche asserts that the death of God is a necessary step in human evolution, as it allows humanity to embrace its freedom and create its own values and meanings.

Albert Camus also presents a similar argument in his book The Myth of Sisyphus. Camus argues that human existence is absurd because there is no inherent purpose or meaning to life. He contends that humans must create their own meaning in the face of this absurdity, and that the concept of God is a distraction from this task. Camus asserts that the only way to confront the absurdity of existence is through rebellion, which involves embracing life despite its lack of inherent meaning.

Martin Heidegger also presents an existentialist argument for the non-existence of God in his book Being and Time. Heidegger contends that human existence is characterized by anxiety and dread because humans are aware of their mortality and the ultimate futility of their actions. He argues that if God existed, he would have provided humanity with a clear purpose and meaning for existence, thus alleviating this anxiety. However, since no such purpose or meaning exists, it follows that God does not exist.

The "no reason" argument

The "no reason" argument tries to show that an omnipotent and omniscient being would not have any reason to act in any way, specifically by creating the universe, because it would have no needs, wants, or desires since these very concepts are subjectively human. Since the universe exists, there is a contradiction, and therefore, an omnipotent god cannot exist. This argument is expounded upon by Scott Adams in the book God's Debris, which puts forward a form of Pandeism as its fundamental theological model. A similar argument is put forward in Ludwig von Mises's "Human Action". He referred to it as the "praxeological argument" and claimed that a perfect being would have long ago satisfied all its wants and desires and would no longer be able to take action in the present without proving that it had been unable to achieve its wants faster—showing it imperfect.

The argument is based on the idea that if something exists, there must be a reason or explanation for its existence. Therefore, if God exists, there must be a reason or explanation for his existence. However, proponents of the "no reason" argument argue that there is no reason or explanation for God's existence, and therefore he does not exist.

One of the main proponents of the "no reason" argument is J. L. Mackie. In his book The Miracle of Theism: Arguments For and Against the Existence of God, Mackie argues that the concept of an uncaused cause, which is often used to explain God's existence, is flawed. He argues that if everything must have a cause or explanation for its existence, then God must also have a cause or explanation for his existence. However, since God is often described as an uncaused cause, this creates a contradiction in the concept of God.

Another proponent of the "no reason" argument is Bertrand Russell. In his book Why I Am Not a Christian, Russell argues that the concept of God as an uncaused cause is illogical. He argues that if everything must have a cause or explanation for its existence, then God must also have a cause or explanation for his existence. However, since God is often described as an uncaused cause, this creates a contradiction in the concept of God.

Furthermore, proponents of the "no reason" argument argue that the burden of proof lies with those who claim that God exists. They argue that since there is no evidence or reason to believe in God's existence, it is more reasonable to assume that he does not exist.

In addition to these arguments, proponents of the "no reason" argument also point to the problem of evil as evidence against God's existence. They argue that if God is all-powerful, all-knowing, and all-good, then he would not allow evil to exist in the world for any reason. He would have no specific reason for doing so. However, since evil does exist and is allowed to, this creates a contradiction in the concept of God.

=== Empirical arguments ===
The following empirical arguments rely on observations or experimentation to yield their conclusions.

==== Argument from naturalism ====
The argument from naturalism is a philosophical argument that asserts that the natural world is all there is and that supernatural explanations are unnecessary. This argument is based on the premise that the universe operates according to natural laws and that these laws can be discovered through scientific inquiry. The argument from naturalism has been a topic of debate among philosophers for centuries, with proponents and opponents presenting various arguments and counterarguments.

The argument from naturalism can be traced to ancient Greek philosophy, where philosophers such as Democritus and Epicurus argued that the universe was composed of atoms and void, with no need for supernatural explanations. However, it was not until the Enlightenment period in the 18th century that naturalism became a dominant philosophical position. During this time, philosophers such as David Hume and Immanuel Kant argued that knowledge could only be derived from empirical observation and rational analysis, without recourse to supernatural explanations.

One of the key premises of the argument from naturalism is that the natural world is all there is. According to this view, there are no supernatural entities or forces that exist beyond the physical realm. This premise is based on the assumption that everything in the universe operates according to natural laws, which can be discovered through scientific inquiry. As philosopher Paul Kurtz states, "the naturalistic outlook holds that nature is a self-contained system of physical causes and effects"

Another important premise of the argument from naturalism is that supernatural explanations are unnecessary. According to this view, any phenomenon in the universe can be explained through natural causes and processes, without invoking supernatural entities or forces. This premise is based on the assumption that naturalistic explanations are sufficient to account for all observed phenomena. As philosopher William L. Rowe states, "Naturalism holds that there is no need to postulate any supernatural entities or forces in order to explain the world."

Proponents of the argument from naturalism argue that naturalistic explanations are more parsimonious than supernatural explanations. This means that naturalistic explanations are simpler and require fewer assumptions than supernatural explanations. For example, if a person observes a tree falling, a naturalistic explanation would be that the tree fell due to gravity, whereas a supernatural explanation would be that a deity caused the tree to fall. The naturalistic explanation is simpler and requires fewer assumptions than the supernatural explanation.

Opponents of the argument from naturalism argue that there are phenomena in the universe that cannot be explained through naturalistic causes and processes. These phenomena are often referred to as "supernatural" or "paranormal" and include things like miracles, psychic abilities, and near-death experiences. According to opponents of naturalism, these phenomena require supernatural explanations.

However, proponents of the argument from naturalism counter that there is no empirical evidence to support supernatural explanations for these phenomena. They argue that many supposed supernatural phenomena can be explained through naturalistic causes and processes. For example, near-death experiences can be explained through changes in brain chemistry and oxygen deprivation, rather than as evidence of an afterlife.

==== The Argument from Evolution ====
The Argument from Evolution against God's existence is a philosophical argument that attempts to prove the non-existence of God by using the theory of evolution. The argument is based on the idea that the theory of evolution provides a natural explanation for the diversity of life on Earth, and therefore, there is no need to invoke a divine creator.

The theory of evolution was first proposed by Charles Darwin in his book On the Origin of Species in 1859. According to the theory, all living organisms have evolved over time from a common ancestor through a process of natural selection. Natural selection is the process by which certain traits become more or less common in a population over time depending on their usefulness for survival and reproduction. Over millions of years, this process has led to the vast diversity of life we see on Earth today.

One of the key arguments against God's existence based on evolution is known as the argument from imperfection. This argument suggests that if God were responsible for creating all life on Earth, then why would he create imperfect organisms? For example, why would he create animals with vestigial organs that serve no purpose or cause suffering?

Another argument against God's existence based on evolution is known as the argument from bad design. This argument suggests that if God were responsible for creating all life on Earth, then why would he create organisms with such poor design features? For example, why would he create animals with eyes that are poorly designed or prone to disease?

==== The Euthyphro dilemma ====
The Euthyphro dilemma is a philosophical problem that raises questions about the relationship between morality and God's existence. The dilemma was first presented by the ancient Greek philosopher Plato in his dialogue "Euthyphro". The dilemma asks whether something is morally good because God commands it, or whether God commands it because it is morally good. This dilemma has been used as an argument against the existence of God, as it seems to suggest that either God is not necessary for morality or that God's commands are arbitrary and not based on any objective standard of morality.

The first horn of the dilemma suggests that something is morally good because God commands it. This view is known as divine command theory, which states that moral truths are grounded in God's will or commands. According to this view, God's commands determine what is right and wrong, and morality is dependent on God's existence. If God did not exist, then there would be no objective basis for morality.

The second horn of the dilemma suggests that God commands something because it is morally good. This view implies that there is an objective standard of morality that exists independently of God's will. In other words, God recognizes what is morally good and commands us to follow it. This view is known as moral realism, which holds that moral truths exist independently of human opinion or belief.

Critics of the divine command theory argue that it leads to a problematic conclusion: if something is morally good simply because God commands it, then anything could be considered morally good if God commanded it. For example, if God commanded us to kill innocent people, then killing innocent people would be considered morally good according to divine command theory. This seems to suggest that morality is arbitrary and dependent on God's whims rather than being grounded in any objective standard.

On the other hand, critics of moral realism argue that it raises questions about the nature of morality itself. If there is an objective standard of morality that exists independently of God's will, then what is the source of this standard? Is it a natural law, or is it something else entirely? Furthermore, if there is an objective standard of morality, then why do different cultures and societies have different moral codes? This seems to suggest that morality is not as objective as moral realists claim.

==== The problem of anthropic argument ====
The anthropic argument is a philosophical and theological concept that argues that the universe and its physical laws are finely tuned to allow for the existence of life and, therefore, must have been designed by an intelligent creator. Proponents of this argument claim that the odds of the universe existing as it does by chance are so astronomically low that it is more reasonable to believe in a creator than not. However, opponents of the anthropic argument argue that it is flawed and does not necessarily prove the existence of God.

One of the main criticisms of the anthropic argument is that it suffers from the fallacy of selection bias. This is because proponents only consider the universe as it exists today, without taking into account all the other possible ways it could have existed. For example, if the physical laws were different, life as we know it may not have been possible, but that does not mean that some other form of life could not have existed under those conditions. Therefore, opponents argue that just because our universe allows for life does not necessarily mean that it was designed to do so.

Another criticism of the anthropic argument is that it assumes that life is inherently valuable and important. Opponents argue that this is a subjective value judgment and cannot be used as evidence for the existence of God. Additionally, opponents point out that there are many aspects of the universe that are not conducive to life, such as black holes or supernovae, which could be seen as evidence against a benevolent creator.

Furthermore, opponents argue that the anthropic argument is based on a flawed understanding of probability. They claim that just because something is unlikely does not mean it is impossible, and therefore, low probabilities cannot be used as evidence for design. Additionally, opponents argue that probability calculations can only be made if all possible outcomes are known, which is impossible in the case of the universe.

Opponents of the anthropic argument also point out that there are alternative explanations for the fine-tuning of the universe. Some scientists propose the multiverse theory, which suggests that our universe is just one of many possible universes, each with its own set of physical laws. In this scenario, it is not surprising that we find ourselves in a universe that allows for life because we could not exist in any other type of universe. Other scientists suggest that the physical constants of the universe are not actually fixed but can vary over time, which could explain why our universe appears to be finely tuned for life.

==== Argument from the problem of miracles ====
The problem of miracles is rooted in the concept of natural law, which assumes that the universe operates according to predictable and consistent laws. According to this view, any event that violates natural law, such as a miracle, cannot occur. Therefore, if a miracle is claimed to have occurred, it must be either a misunderstanding or a deliberate deception.

One of the most prominent advocates of the problem of miracles was the Scottish philosopher David Hume. In his essay "Of Miracles", Hume argued that it is always more reasonable to believe that someone is mistaken or lying than to accept that a miracle has occurred. He claimed that there is no amount of testimony or evidence that can prove a miracle beyond doubt because it always contradicts natural law. Hume's argument was based on his empiricist philosophy, which held that all knowledge comes from sensory experience and that claims about supernatural events are not supported by such experience.

==== The argument from the problem of religious experience ====
This argument suggests that religious experiences are subjective and cannot be verified or falsified, making them unreliable as evidence for the existence of God.

The argument from the problem of religious experience against God's existence can be formulated as follows:

1. Religious experiences are subjective and cannot be verified or falsified.

2. If religious experiences cannot be verified or falsified, then they are unreliable as evidence for the existence of God.

3. Therefore, religious experiences are unreliable as evidence for the existence of God.

Premise 1 is based on the fact that religious experiences are personal and subjective. They are often described in terms of feelings, emotions, and sensations that are difficult to describe or measure objectively. For example, a person may claim to have had a mystical experience in which they felt a deep sense of unity with all things. However, this experience cannot be objectively measured or verified by others. It is purely subjective and exists only in the mind of the individual who had it.

Premise 2 follows logically from premise 1. If religious experiences cannot be verified or falsified, then they cannot be used as evidence to support any particular belief about God's existence or nature. This is because there is no way to distinguish between genuine religious experiences and mere hallucinations or delusions. Without objective criteria for verifying or falsifying religious experiences, they remain purely subjective and cannot be used as evidence in any rational debate about the existence of God.

Premise 3 is the conclusion that follows logically from premises 1 and 2. If religious experiences are unreliable as evidence for the existence of God, then they cannot be used to support any argument for the existence of God. This means that any argument that relies on religious experiences as evidence for God's existence is inherently flawed and cannot be taken seriously by those who demand objective evidence for their beliefs.

==== Argument from inconsistent revelations ====
The argument from inconsistent revelations is an argument that aims to show that one cannot choose one religion over another since their revelations are inconsistent with each other and that any two religions cannot both be true. The argument appears, among other places, in Voltaire's 1759 Candide and 1764 Philosophical Dictionary. Related arguments from interreligious disagreement usually appeal to the assumption that God would not reveal God's self in varying ways and especially not through the distinct, highly specific doctrines and moral commands found in major religious traditions. Yet such arguments often neglect to compare the core commitments such religion have in common, namely their interreligious agreements, which might itself lend itself to supporting a broad theism or supernaturalism, over against atheism or agnosticism (see discussion by John Hick and Matthew Benton.)

==== Argument from parsimony ====
The argument from parsimony (using Occam's razor) contends that since natural (non-supernatural) theories adequately explain the development of religion and belief in gods, the actual existence of such supernatural agents is superfluous and may be dismissed unless otherwise proven to be required to explain the phenomenon.

==== Argument from historical induction ====
The argument from "historical induction" concludes that since most theistic religions throughout history (e.g. ancient Egyptian religion, ancient Greek religion) and their gods ultimately come to be regarded as untrue or incorrect, all theistic religions, including contemporary ones, are therefore most likely untrue/incorrect by induction. H. L. Mencken wrote a short piece about the topic entitled "Memorial Service" in 1922. It is implied as part of Stephen F. Roberts' popular quotation:

I contend that we are both atheists. I just believe in one fewer god than you do. When you understand why you dismiss all the other possible gods, you will understand why I dismiss yours.

==== Argument from nonbelief ====
The argument from nonbelief is a philosophical argument for the nonexistence of God that asserts an inconsistency between God's existence and a world that fails to recognize such an entity. It is similar to the classic argument from evil in arguing that there is an inconsistency between the world that exists and God's existence. The argument is key in philosophical discussions about divine hiddenness.

There are three key varieties of the argument. The argument from reasonable nonbelief (or the argument from divine hiddenness) was first elaborated in J. L. Schellenberg's 1993 book Divine Hiddenness and Human Reason. According to this argument, if God existed (and was perfectly good and loving) every reasonable person would have been brought to believe in God, but since there are reasonable nonbelievers, it follows that God does not exist.

Theodore Drange subsequently developed the argument from nonbelief, based on the mere existence of nonbelief in God. Drange considers the distinction between reasonable (by which Schellenberg means inculpable) and unreasonable (culpable) nonbelief to be irrelevant and confusing. Nevertheless, the overwhelming majority of academic discussion is concerned with Schellenberg's formulation.

Schellenberg's formulation, however, has evolved since his 1993 book. Contemporary versions of the argument no longer trade on inculpable nonbelief or deal with God's goodness. Rather, the argument from nonresistant nonbelief (or the contemporary hiddenness argument) argues that if God exists, then no one would ever be in a state of nonresistant nonbelief (that is, a state in which they do not believe in God's existence despite not resisting him in any way), but since some people have been in such a state, God does not exist. The basic engine behind this argument is the idea that God, being unsurpassably loving, would always make it possible for any such capable persons as there may be to begin a relationship with him just by trying. To begin a relationship, according to Schellenberg, both parties must know about the other's existence. Therefore, God would never allow any capable person to be in a state of nonresistant nonbelief at any time.

==== Arguments from the poor design of the universe ====
The problem of evil contests the existence of a god who is both omnipotent and omnibenevolent by arguing that such a god should not permit the existence of evil or suffering. The theist responses are called theodicies. Similarly, the argument from poor design contends that an all-powerful, benevolent creator god would not have created lifeforms, including humans, which seem to exhibit poor design.

Richard Carrier has argued that the universe itself seems to be very ill-designed for life, because the vast majority of the space in the universe is utterly hostile to it. This is arguably unexpected on the hypothesis that the universe was designed by a god, especially a personal god. Carrier contends that such a god could have easily created a geocentric universe ex nihilo in the recent past, in which most of the volume of the universe is inhabitable by humans and other lifeforms—precisely the kind of universe that most humans believed in until the rise of modern science. While a personal god might have created the kind of universe we observe, Carrier contends that this is not the kind of universe we would most likely expect to see if such a god existed. He finally argues that, unlike theism, our observations about the nature of the universe are strongly expected on the hypothesis of atheism, since the universe would have to be vast, very old, and almost completely devoid of life if life were to have arisen by sheer chance.

=== Subjective arguments ===
Similar to the subjective arguments for the existence of God, subjective arguments against God's existence mainly rely on the testimony or experience of witnesses, or the propositions of a revealed religion in general.

- The witness argument gives credibility to personal witnesses, contemporary and from the past, who disbelieve or strongly doubt the existence of God.
- The conflicted religions argument notes that many religions give differing accounts as to what God is and what God wants; since all the contradictory accounts cannot be correct, many if not all religions must be incorrect.
- The disappointment argument claims that if, when asked for, there is no visible help from God, there is no reason to believe that there is a God.

=== Hindu arguments ===
Atheistic Hindu doctrines cite various arguments for rejecting a creator God or Ishvara. The Samkhyapravachana Sutra of the Samkhya school states that there is no philosophical place for a creator God in this system. It is also argued in this text that the existence of Ishvara (God) cannot be proved and hence cannot be admitted to exist. Classical Samkhya argues against the existence of God on metaphysical grounds. For instance, it argues that an unchanging God cannot be the source of an ever-changing world. It says God is a necessary metaphysical assumption demanded by circumstances. The Sutras of Samkhya endeavor to prove that the idea of God is inconceivable and self-contradictory, and some commentaries speak plainly on this subject. The Sankhya- tattva-kaumudi, commenting on Karika 57, argues that a perfect God can have no need to create a world, and if God's motive is kindness, Samkhya questions whether it is reasonable to call into existence beings who while non-existent had no suffering. Samkhya postulates that a benevolent deity ought to create only happy creatures, not an imperfect world like the real world.

According to Sinha, the following arguments were given by Samkhya philosophers against the idea of an eternal, self-caused, creator God:

- If the existence of karma is assumed, the proposition of God as a moral governor of the universe is unnecessary. For, if God enforces the consequences of actions then he can do so without karma. If however, he is assumed to be within the law of karma, then karma itself would be the giver of consequences and there would be no need of a God.
- Even if karma is denied, God still cannot be the enforcer of consequences. Because the motives of an enforcer God would be either egoistic or altruistic. Now, God's motives cannot be assumed to be altruistic because an altruistic God would not create a world so full of suffering. If his motives are assumed to be egoistic, then God must be thought to have desire, as agency or authority cannot be established in the absence of desire. However, assuming that God has desire would contradict God's eternal freedom which necessitates no compulsion in actions. Moreover, desire, according to Samkhya, is an attribute of prakṛti and cannot be thought to grow in God.
- Despite arguments to the contrary, if God is still assumed to contain unfulfilled desires, this would cause him to suffer pain and other similar human experiences. Such a worldly God would be no better than Samkhya's notion of higher self.
- Furthermore, there is no proof of the existence of God. He is not the object of perception, there exists no general proposition that can prove him by inference.

Therefore, Samkhya maintained that the various cosmological, ontological and teleological arguments could not prove God.

Proponents of the school of Mimamsa, which is based on rituals and orthopraxy, decided that the evidence allegedly proving the existence of God is insufficient. They argue that there is no need to postulate a maker for the world, just as there is no need for an author to compose the Vedas or a god to validate the rituals. Mimamsa argues that the gods named in the Vedas have no existence apart from the mantras that speak their names. In that regard, the power of the mantras is what is seen as the power of gods.

== Psychological aspects ==
Europeans polled who "believe in a god", according to Eurobarometer in 2005

North Americans polled about religious identity (2010–2012)

Several authors have offered psychological or sociological explanations for belief in the existence of deities.

Psychologists observe that the majority of humans often ask existential questions such as "why we are here" and whether life has purpose. Some psychologists have posited that religious beliefs may recruit cognitive mechanisms in order to satisfy these questions. William James emphasized the inner religious struggle between melancholy and happiness, and pointed to trance as a cognitive mechanism. Sigmund Freud stressed fear and pain, the need for a powerful parental figure, the obsessional nature of ritual, and the hypnotic state a community can induce as contributing factors to the psychology of religion.

Pascal Boyer's Religion Explained (2002), based in part on his anthropological field work, treats belief in God as the result of the brain's tendency towards agency detection. Boyer suggests that, because of evolutionary pressures, humans err on the side of attributing agency where there is not any. In Boyer's view, belief in supernatural entities spreads and becomes culturally fixed because of their memorability. The concept of "minimally counterintuitive" beings that differ from the ordinary in a small number of ways (such as being invisible, able to fly, or having access to strategic and otherwise secret information) leave a lasting impression that spreads through word-of-mouth.

Scott Atran's In Gods We Trust: The Evolutionary Landscape of Religion (2002) makes a similar argument and adds examination of the socially coordinating aspects of shared belief. In Minds and Gods: The Cognitive Foundations of Religion, Todd Tremlin follows Boyer in arguing that universal human cognitive process naturally produces the concept of the supernatural. Tremlin contends that an agency detection device (ADD) and a theory of mind module (ToMM) lead humans to suspect an agent behind every event. Natural events for which there is no obvious agent may be attributed to God (cf. Act of God).

== See also ==
- Apologetics
- Copleston–Russell debate
- Christian existential apologetics
- Efficacy of prayer
- The Existence of God (book)
- Existence of Jesus
- Gödel's ontological proof
- Is There a God?
- Metaphysics
- Pascal's Wager
- Problem of evil
- Problem of the creator of God
- Relationship between religion and science
- Spectrum of theistic probability
- The Atheist Experience
- Transcendental theology
- Why is there anything at all?

== Sources ==
- Adamson, Peter (2013-07-04). "From the necessary existent to God". In Adamson, Peter (ed.). Interpreting Avicenna: Critical Essays. Cambridge University Press. ISBN 978-0-521-19073-2.
- Adamson, Peter (2016). Philosophy in the Islamic World: A History of Philosophy Without Any Gaps. Oxford University Press. ISBN 978-0-19-957749-1.
- Alston, William P. (1991). "The Inductive Argument from Evil and the Human Cognitive Condition". Philosophical Perspectives. 5: 29–67. doi:10.2307/2214090. ISSN 1758-2245. JSTOR 2214090. S2CID 16744068.
- Bergmann, Michael (1999). "Might-Counterfactuals, Transworld Untrustworthiness, and Plantinga's Free Will Defense" (PDF). Faith and Philosophy. 16 (3): 336–351. doi:10.5840/faithphil199916332. ISSN 2153-3393.
- Howard-Snyder, Daniel; O'Leary-Hawthorne, John (1998). "Transworld Sanctity and Plantinga's Free Will Defense". International Journal for Philosophy of Religion. 44 (1): 1–21. doi:10.1023/A:1003210017171. ISSN 1572-8684. S2CID 171072893.
- Inati, Shams C. (2014). Ibn Sina's Remarks and Admonitions: Physics and Metaphysics: An Analysis and Annotated Translation. Columbia University Press. ISBN 978-0-231-53742-1.
- LaFollette, Hugh (1980). "Plantinga on the Free Will Defense" (PDF). International Journal for Philosophy of Religion. 11 (2): 123–132. doi:10.1007/BF00136761. ISSN 1572-8684. S2CID 170584546.
- Mayer, Toby (2001). "Ibn Sina's 'Burhan Al-Siddiqin'". Journal of Islamic Studies. 12 (1). Oxford University Press: 18–39. doi:10.1093/jis/12.1.18.
- Meister, Chad (2009). Introducing Philosophy of Religion. London: Routledge. doi:10.4324/9780203880029. ISBN 978-0-415-40327-6.
- Peterson, Michael; Hasker, William; Reichenbach, Bruce; Basinger, David (1991). Reason and Religious Belief: An Introduction to the Philosophy of Religion. New York: Oxford University Press. ISBN 978-0-19-506155-0.
- Plantinga, Alvin (1965). "The Free Will Defence". In Black, Max (ed.). Philosophy in America. Ithaca, New York: Cornell University Press.
- Plantinga, Alvin (1977). God, Freedom, and Evil. Grand Rapids, Michigan: Wm. B. Eerdmans Publishing Company. ISBN 978-0-8028-1731-0.
- Rizvi, Sajjad (2009). "Mulla Sadra". In Zalta, Edward N. (ed.). Stanford Encyclopedia of Philosophy. ISSN 1095-5054. OCLC 429049174.

Lectures

- Hegel, Lectures on the Proofs of the Existence of God
