= Argument from beauty =

Argument for the existence of God

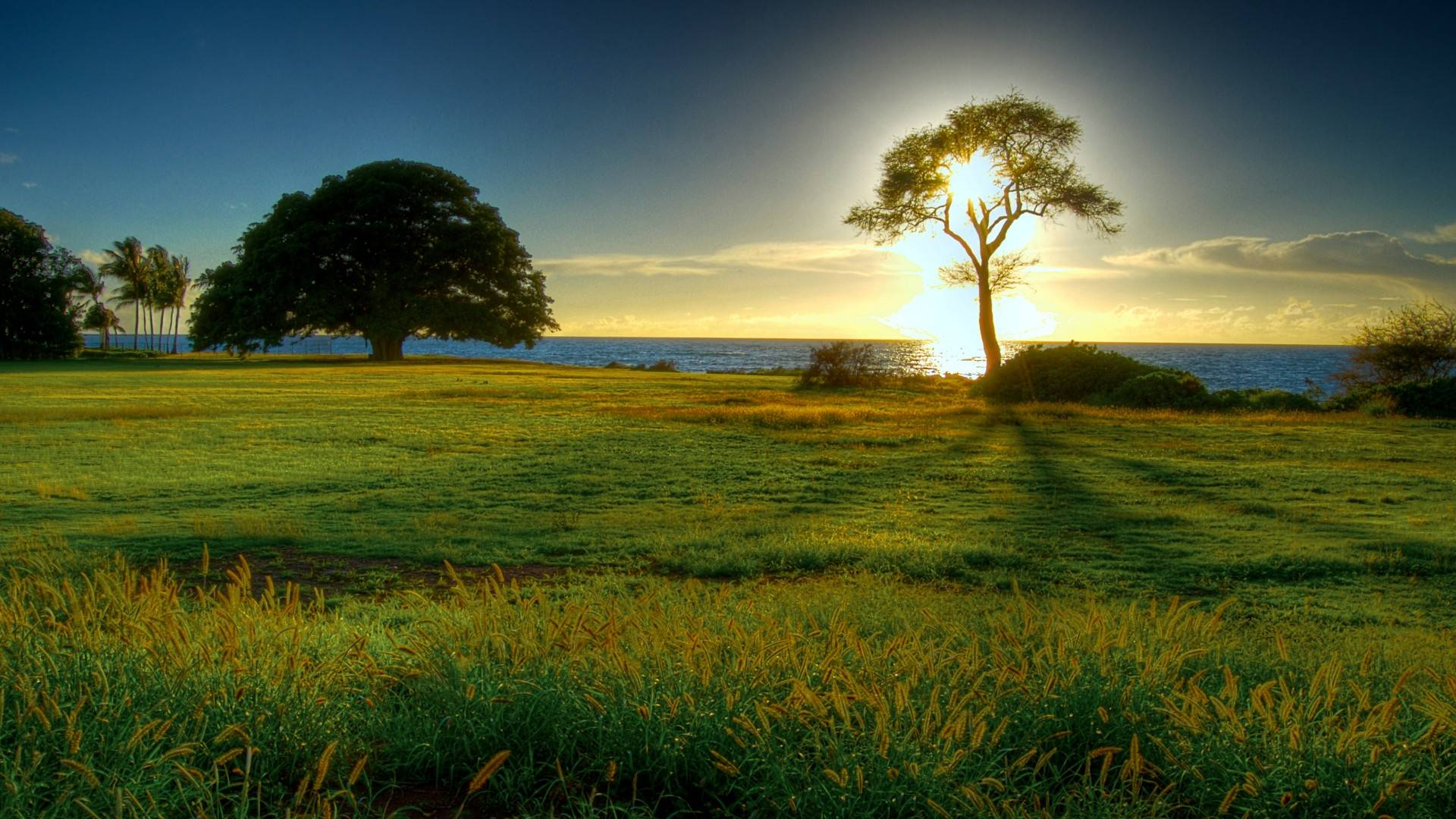
A field in Kosovo

The argument from beauty (also the aesthetic argument) is an argument for the existence of a realm of immaterial ideas or, most commonly, for the existence of God, that roughly states that the evident beauty in nature, art and music and even in more abstract areas like the elegance of the laws of physics or the elegant laws of mathematics is evidence of a creator deity who has arranged these things to be beautiful (aesthetically pleasing, or "good") and not ugly.

Plato argued there is a transcendent plane of abstract ideas, or universals, which are more perfect than real-world examples of those ideas. Later philosophers connected this plane to the idea of goodness, beauty, and then the Christian God.

Various observers have also argued that the experience of beauty is evidence of the existence of a universal God. Depending on the observer, this might include artificially beautiful things like music or art, natural beauty like landscapes or astronomical bodies, or the elegance of abstract ideas like the laws of mathematics or physics.

== History of the argument from Platonic universals ==
Bust of Plato in Achilleion

The argument from beauty has two aspects. The first is connected with the independent existence of what philosophers term a "universal". Plato argued that particular examples of, say a circle, all fall short of the perfect exemplar of a circle that exists outside the realm of the senses as an eternal Idea. Beauty for Plato is a particularly important type of universal. In Platonic epistemology, perfect beauty exists only in the eternal Form of beauty. For Plato, the argument for a timeless idea of beauty does not involve so much whether the gods exist (Plato was not a monotheist) but rather whether there is an immaterial realm independent and superior to the imperfect world of sense. Later Greek thinkers such as Plotinus (c. 204/5–270 AD) expanded Plato's argument to support the existence of a totally transcendent "One", containing no parts. Plotinus identified this "One" with the concept of "Good" and the principle of "Beauty".

Christianity adopted this Neo-Platonic conception and saw it as a strong argument for the existence of a supreme God. In the early fifth century, for example, Augustine of Hippo discusses the many beautiful things in nature and asks "Who made these beautiful changeable things, if not one who is beautiful and unchangeable?" This second aspect is what most people today understand as the argument from beauty.

== Richard Swinburne ==
Richard Swinburne, a professor at the University of Oxford, in 2009

A contemporary British philosopher of religion and Emeritus Professor of Philosophy at the University of Oxford, Richard Swinburne, who is known for philosophical arguments about the existence of God, advocates a variation of the argument from beauty:

God has reason to make a basically beautiful world, although also reason to leave some of the beauty or ugliness of the world within the power of creatures to determine; but he would seem to have overriding reason not to make a basically ugly world beyond the powers of creatures to improve. Hence, if there is a God there is more reason to expect a basically beautiful world than a basically ugly one. A priori, however, there is no particular reason for expecting a basically beautiful rather than a basically ugly world. In consequence, if the world is beautiful, that fact would be evidence for God's existence. For, in this case, if we let k be 'there is an orderly physical universe', e be 'there is a beautiful universe', and h be 'there is a God', P(e/h.k) will be greater than P(e/k)... Few, however, would deny that our universe (apart from its animal and human inhabitants, and aspects subject to their immediate control) has that beauty. Poets and painters and ordinary men down the centuries have long admired the beauty of the orderly procession of the heavenly bodies, the scattering of the galaxies through the heavens (in some ways random, in some ways orderly), and the rocks, sea, and wind interacting on earth, The spacious firmament on high, and all the blue ethereal sky, the water lapping against 'the old eternal rocks', and the plants of the jungle and of temperate climates, contrasting with the desert and the Arctic wastes. Who in his senses would deny that here is beauty in abundance? If we confine ourselves to the argument from the beauty of the inanimate and plant worlds, the argument surely works."

== Art as a route to God ==
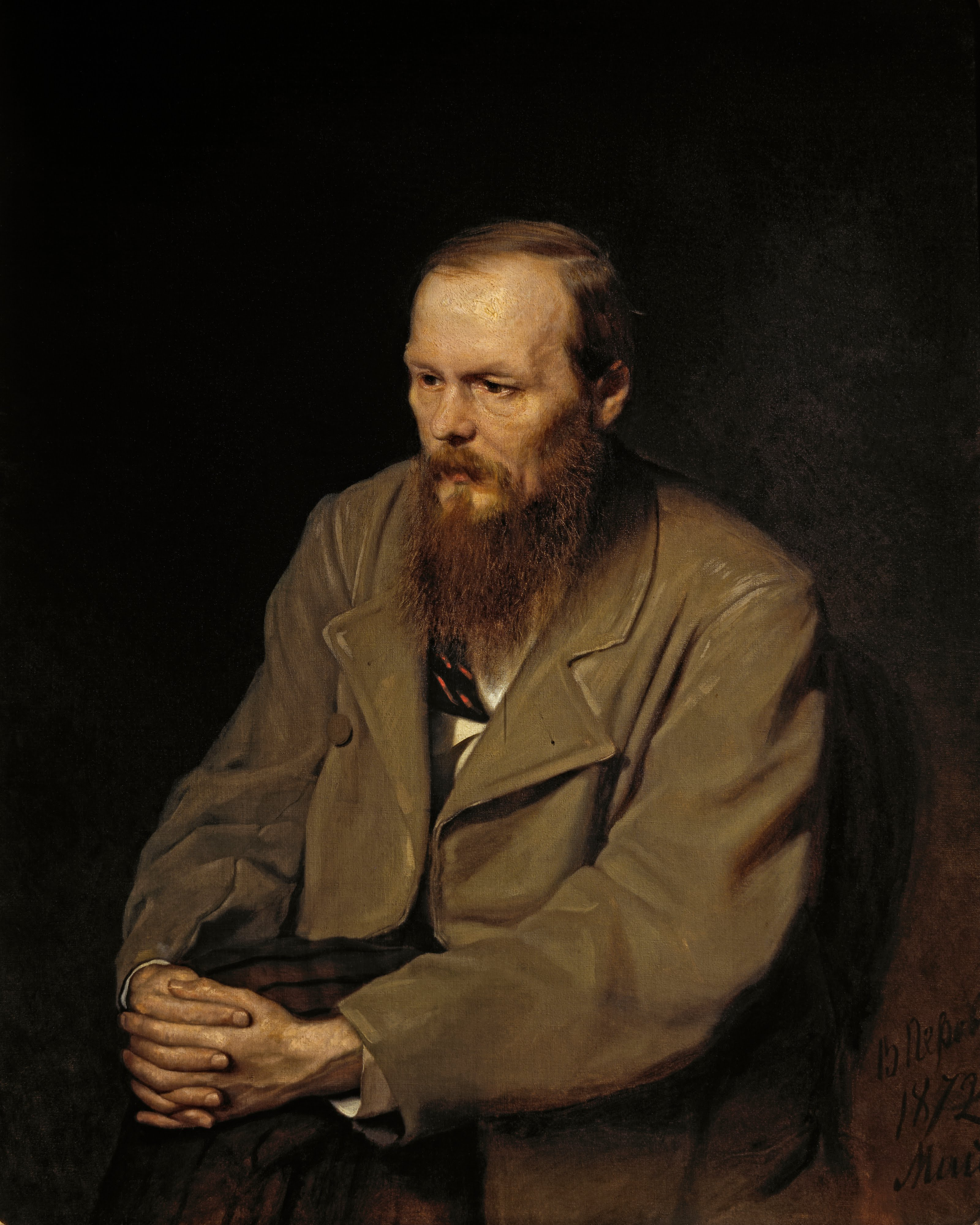
Fyodor Dostoevsky, by Vasily Perov

The most frequent invocation of the argument from beauty today involves the aesthetic experience one obtains from great literature, music or art. In the concert hall or museum one can easily feel carried away from the mundane. For many people this feeling of transcendence approaches the religious in intensity. It is a commonplace to regard concert halls and museums as the cathedrals of the modern age because they seem to translate beauty into meaning and transcendence.

Philosopher and novelist Fyodor Dostoevsky was a proponent of the transcendent nature of beauty. His enigmatic statement: "Beauty will save the world" is frequently cited. Aleksandr Solzhenitsyn in his Nobel Prize lecture reflected upon this phrase:

And so perhaps that old trinity of Truth and Good and Beauty is not just the formal outworn formula it used to seem to us during our heady, materialistic youth. If the crests of these three trees join together, as the investigators and explorers used to affirm, and if the too obvious, too straight branches of Truth and Good are crushed or amputated and cannot reach the light—yet perhaps the whimsical, unpredictable, unexpected branches of Beauty will make their way through and soar up to that very place and in this way perform the work of all three. And in that case it was not a slip of the tongue for Dostoyevsky to say that "Beauty will save the world" but a prophecy. After all, he was given the gift of seeing much, he was extraordinarily illumined. And consequently perhaps art, literature, can in actual fact help the world of today.

== Philosophical basis of science and mathematics ==
Exactly what role to attribute to beauty in mathematics and science is hotly contested. The argument from beauty in science and mathematics is an argument for philosophical realism against nominalism. The debate revolves around the question, "Do things like scientific laws, numbers and sets have an independent 'real' existence outside individual human minds?". The argument is quite complex and still far from settled. Scientists and philosophers often marvel at the congruence between nature and mathematics. In 1960 the Nobel Prize–winning physicist and mathematician Eugene Wigner wrote an article entitled "The Unreasonable Effectiveness of Mathematics in the Natural Sciences". He pointed out that "the enormous usefulness of mathematics in the natural sciences is something bordering on the mysterious and that there is no rational explanation for it." In applying mathematics to understand the natural world, scientists often employ aesthetic criteria that seem far removed from science. Albert Einstein once said that "the only physical theories that we are willing to accept are the beautiful ones." Conversely, beauty can sometimes be misleading; Thomas Huxley wrote that "Science is organized common sense, where many a beautiful theory was killed by an ugly fact."

When developing hypotheses, scientists use beauty and elegance as valuable selective criteria. The more beautiful a theory, the more likely is it to be true. The mathematical physicist Hermann Weyl said with evident amusement, "My work has always tried to unite the true with the beautiful and when I had to choose one or the other, I usually chose the beautiful." The quantum physicist Werner Heisenberg wrote to Einstein, "You may object that by speaking of simplicity and beauty I am introducing aesthetic criteria of truth, and I frankly admit that I am strongly attracted by the simplicity and beauty of the mathematical schemes which nature presents us."

== Criticisms ==
The argument implies beauty is something immaterial instead of being a subjective neurological response to stimuli. Philosophers since Immanuel Kant increasingly argue that beauty is an artifact of individual human minds. A 'beautiful' sunset is according to this perspective aesthetically neutral in itself. It is our cognitive response that interprets it as 'beautiful.' Others would argue that this cognitive response has been developed through the evolutionary development of the brain and its exposure to particular stimuli over long ages. Others point to the existence of evil and various types of ugliness as invalidating the argument. Joseph McCabe, a freethought writer of the early 20th century, questioned the argument in The Existence of God, when he asked whether God also created parasitic microbes.

In his book, The God Delusion, Richard Dawkins describes the argument thus:

Another character in the Aldous Huxley novel just mentioned proved the existence of God by playing Beethoven's string quartet no. 15 in A minor ('Heiliger Dankgesang') on a gramophone. Unconvincing as that sounds, it does represent a popular strand of argument. I have given up counting the number of times I receive the more or less truculent challenge: 'How do you account for Shakespeare, then?' (Substitute Schubert, Michelangelo, etc. to taste.) The argument will be so familiar, I needn’t document it further. But the logic behind it is never spelled out, and the more you think about it the more vacuous you realize it to be. Obviously Beethoven's late quartets are sublime. So are Shakespeare's sonnets. They are sublime if God is there and they are sublime if he isn't. They do not prove the existence of God; they prove the existence of Beethoven and of Shakespeare. A great conductor is credited with saying: 'If you have Mozart to listen to, why would you need God?'

Bertrand Russell had no trouble seeing beauty in mathematics but he did not see it as a valid argument for the existence of God. In "The Study of Mathematics", he wrote:

Mathematics, rightly viewed, possesses not only truth, but supreme beauty—a beauty cold and austere, like that of sculpture, without appeal to any part of our weaker nature, without the gorgeous trappings of painting or music, yet sublimely pure, and capable of a stern perfection such as only the greatest art can show. The true spirit of delight, the exaltation, the sense of being more than Man, which is the touchstone of the highest excellence, is to be found in mathematics as surely as in poetry.

However, he also wrote: "My conclusion is that there is no reason to believe any of the dogmas of traditional theology and, further, that there is no reason to wish that they were true. Man, in so far as he is not subject to natural forces, is free to work out his own destiny. The responsibility is his, and so is the opportunity."

H. L. Mencken stated that humans have created things of greater beauty when he wrote, "I also pass over the relatively crude contrivances of this Creator in the aesthetic field, wherein He has been far surpassed by man, as, for example, for adroitness of design, for complexity or for beauty, the sounds of an orchestra."

== See also ==
- Argument from desire
- Argument from love
- Argument from morality
