= Argument from degree =

Argument for the existence of God

The argument from degrees, also known as the degrees of perfection argument or the henological argument, is an argument for the existence of God first proposed by mediaeval Roman Catholic theologian Thomas Aquinas as one of the five ways to philosophically argue in favour of God's existence in his Summa Theologica. It is based on ontological and theological notions of perfection. Contemporary Thomist scholars are often in disagreement on the metaphysical justification for this proof. According to Edward Feser, the metaphysics involved in the argument has more to do with Aristotle than Plato; hence, while the argument presupposes realism about universals and abstract objects, it would be more accurate to say Aquinas is thinking of Aristotelian realism and not Platonic realism per se. The argument has received several criticisms, including the subjective notion of some qualities such as goodness, perfection or beauty; or the alleged non sequitur assertion that something should necessarily have all properties to the maximum possible degree given a set of entities with those properties.

== Aquinas's original formulation ==
The fourth proof arises from the degrees that are found in things. For there is found a greater and a less degree of goodness, truth, nobility, and the like. But more or less are terms spoken of various things as they approach in diverse ways toward something that is the greatest, just as in the case of hotter (more hot) that approaches nearer the greatest heat. There exists therefore something that is the truest, best, and most noble, and in consequence, the greatest being. For what are the greatest truths are the greatest beings, as is said in the Metaphysics Bk. II. 2. What moreover is the greatest in its way, in another way is the cause of all things of its own kind (or genus); thus fire, which is the greatest heat, is the cause of all heat, as is said in the same book (cf. Plato and Aristotle). Therefore there exists something that is the cause of the existence of all things and of the goodness and of every perfection whatsoever—and this we call God.

== Garrigou-Lagrange commentary ==
In The One God, Reginald Garrigou-Lagrange offers commentary on this proof. Following is a summary of this commentary.

Summary of argument

The premise of the fourth proof is that "being and its transcendental and analogous properties (unity, truth, goodness, beauty) are susceptible of greater and less." Thus it is said that some things are more true, more good, etc.

After this premise follows the principle that "More or less are predicated of different things according as they resemble in their different ways something which is the maximum of and which is the cause of the others." Following is a justification of this principle.

1. Multiple different things are found to share a unity, or a common relation to truth and goodness. However, the similarity found in these things cannot itself be explained by the fact that there is a multiplicity of them. Multitude is "logically and ontologically posterior to unity," meaning that for a multitude of beings to participate in unity, they must somehow be contained under one being separate from these beings, since they cannot themselves cause the unity between them. The fact that goodness, truth, and being can be predicated in varying degrees of a multitude of beings cannot be attributed simply to the fact that there are many such beings.
2. Second, the principle concerns finite beings. Of these the absolute perfections of being, truth, and goodness are predicated in an imperfect manner. It cannot be said, for example, that a stone possesses the fullness of being, truth, or goodness. Therefore, being, truth, and goodness are said to be possessed in finite beings in a "composition of perfection and of a limited capacity for perfection." Therefore, it can be said that the tree and the man possess different degrees of goodness, for example, according to each's limited capacity for perfection. So, a finite amount of goodness is found in each according to its capacity. (But goodness itself is not limited, and, as a concept, goodness has no imperfection.) If there is a composition of perfection and the limited capacity for it in some being, there must be a cause for this composition. In other words, predicating something as more or less implies that this thing is limited in its being. It does not exhaust the fullness of being, and therefore has its being per accidens: its act of being is not essential. Therefore, any being which is predicated as being less or more is a limited being and has its act of being distinct from itself. It participates in being. Hence, there is a composition in such beings of perfection (being, truth, goodness) and the being's nature (capacity for perfection). There must be a cause for this composition.
3. Because "union that is effected according to either composition or similitude" cannot explain itself, there must be a "unity of a higher order." Therefore, there must exist some being which, because it exhausts what is to be, gives being to all limited things which participate in being. Goodness, being, and truth in finite beings must have a cause that is both efficient and exemplary. St. Thomas adds that "the maximum of any genus is the cause of all that in that genus," to indicate that the greatest in truth, goodness, and being is both the exemplar and efficient cause of all other things which display varying degrees of perfection, and so is "the cause of all beings."

Causal structure of argument

Garrigou-Lagrange notes that it may appear that this fourth way "does not proceed by the way of causality" because it does not follow the same structure as the first three proofs. Unlike the other proofs, it does not explicitly rely on the impossibility of an infinite, essentially ordered causal series. However, in the second article, St. Thomas has already asserted that the only way to prove the existence of God is from his effects, and it is only possible to conduct this proof based on the nature of causality. Therefore, the fourth way is not a probabilistic argument. It does not merely say that because degree is observed in things, it is likely that God exists as an "exemplar in this order" (the order of things that are good, true, and be). Instead, the fourth way proceeds from the necessity of a "supreme Good" as a cause, the "cause of other beings."

Aquinas explains, "If one of some kind is found as a common note in several objects, this must be because some one cause has brought it about in them." There cannot be multiple causes for this one note which proceed from the objects themselves. These objects are distinct from each other by nature, and therefore, if they were individual causes, they would produce different effects, rather than the same one effect. Essentially, there must be one nature that produces this common note, rather than each producing it in themselves. Therefore, it is causally impossible for multiple diverse beings to share a common note (goodness, being, or truth) with each as the cause of this note.

By the same principle, "if anything is found to be participated in various degrees by several objects," the objects which are said to possess more or less perfection cannot contain in themselves the fullness of perfection, or predication of more or less would be meaningless. Consequently, among these imperfect things, the varying degrees of perfection found in them cannot be attributable to themselves. Instead, it must be attributed to some common cause apart from them, since again, if this were not so, a diversity of effects would be observed issuing from the naturally distinct objects, rather than the one participated perfection. It is causally impossible for multiple imperfect objects which participate in perfection to cause this perfection in themselves.

Therefore, there must be one object which possesses this perfection in the highest degree and which is the source of the perfection in the others. Thus, the fourth way "proves the necessity of a maximum in being," or a Being without a composition of perfection and limited capacity for perfection.

Applications of argument

Garrigou-Lagrange then considers the various ways Aquinas applied this argument to the intellect, truth, goodness, and the natural law.

1. Humans have intellectual souls. They are called such "by reason of a participation in the intellectual power": it is not wholly intellectual. Secondly, the human soul is distinct from intellectual power as such because it reaches understanding of truth by reasoning, which implies motion. Therefore, the human intellectual soul, because it is participatory (imperfect) and "in motion," must depend on a higher intellect, which is "the self-subsisting Being."
2. It is possible to discern truths that are necessary and universal, such as the principle of contradiction. This absolute necessity, however, requires an "actually existing and necessary foundation." There must therefore exist an absolutely necessary and eternal foundation, in the "first Truth as in the universal Cause that contains all truth," the maximum truth. For example, the principle of contradiction is a law which governs all real beings. Since a multitude cannot explain unity, the foundation of this truth cannot issue from "either contingent being or in the different natures of contingent beings." Likewise, the natural law is not caused by a multitude of beings who indicate it, but by "participation of the eternal law."
3. The fourth proof is also applied to the argument from desire for the existence of God. Because "more and less are predicated of different goods," if there is a natural appetite for the universal good in the things of nature, and good is not in the mind but in things, there must be a universal or most perfect good. Otherwise, this natural desire would be a "psychological contraction." Thus, the argument from desire is based on the fourth proof and the principle that "every agent acts for an end, and that a natural desire cannot be purposeless."

== Syllogistic form ==
A syllogistic form collected by Robert J. Schihl follows:

1. Objects have properties to greater or lesser extents.
2. If an object has a property to a lesser extent, then there exists some other object that has the property to the maximum possible degree.
3. So there is an entity that has all properties to the maximum possible degree.
4. Hence God exists.

A second syllogistic form:

1. Objects are said to be less or more concerning being, goodness, and truth.
2. To predicate these things in this manner necessarily analyzes them as limited.
3. Limited beings participate in being.
4. Anything that participates in being is contingent upon a cause outside itself for its being.
5. A series of things participating in being reduces to a cause that does not participate in being.
6. A cause that does not participate in being is being itself.
7. This is called God.
