= Of Miracles =

Hume's thoughts on miracles in his Enquiry

"Of Miracles" is the tenth section of David Hume's An Enquiry Concerning Human Understanding (1748). In this piece, Hume states that evidence of miracles is never sufficient for rational belief.

== Overview ==
Put simply, Hume defines a miracle as a violation of a law of nature (understood as a regularity of past experience projected by the mind to future cases) and argues that the evidence for a miracle is never sufficient for rational belief because it is more likely that a report of a miracle is false as a result of misperception, mistransmission, or deception ("that this person should either deceive or be deceived"), than that a violation of a regularity of experience has actually occurred. For obvious reasons, the argument has infuriated some Christians, especially given the reference to the Resurrection:

When anyone tells me, that he saw a dead man restored to life, I immediately consider with myself, whether it be more probable, that this person should either deceive or be deceived, or that the fact, which he relates, should really have happened.... If the falsehood of his testimony would be more miraculous, than the event which he relates; then, and not till then, can he pretend to command my belief or opinion.

== Origins and text ==
Hume did not publish his views on miracles in his early, 1739, Treatise, and the sections on miracles were often omitted by publishers in early editions of his 1748 Enquiry.

For instance, in the 19th-century edition of Hume's Enquiry (in Sir John Lubbock's series, "One Hundred Books"), sections X and XI were omitted, appearing in an Appendix with the misleading explanation that they were normally left out of popular editions. Although the two sections appear in the full text of the Enquiry in modern editions, chapter X has also been published separately, both as a separate book and in collections.

In his December 1737 letter to his friend and relative Henry Home, Lord Kames, Hume set out his reasons for omitting the sections on miracles in the earlier Treatise. He described how he went about "castrating" the Treatise so as to "give as little offence" to the religious as possible. He added that he had considered publishing the argument against miracles—as well as other anti-theistic arguments—as part of the Treatise, but decided against it so as to not offend the religious sensibilities of readers.

== The argument ==
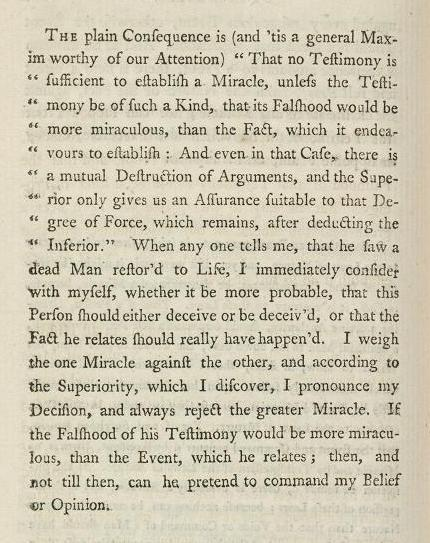

Hume starts by telling the reader that he believes that he has "discovered an argument ... which, if just, will, with the wise and learned, be an everlasting check to all kinds of superstitious delusion".

Hume first explains the principle of evidence: the only way that we can judge between two empirical claims is by weighing the evidence. The degree to which we believe one claim over another is proportional to the degree by which the evidence for one outweighs the evidence for the other. The weight of evidence is a function of such factors as the reliability, manner, and number of witnesses.

Now, a miracle is defined as "a transgression of a law of nature by a particular volition of the Deity, or by the interposition of some invisible agent." Laws of nature, however, are established by "a firm and unalterable experience"; they rest upon the exceptionless testimony of countless people in different places and times. In this way Hume is careful to distinguish the miraculous from the merely wondrous or unusual.

Nothing is esteemed a miracle, if it ever happen in the common course of nature. It is no miracle that a man, seemingly in good health, should die on a sudden: because such a kind of death, though more unusual than any other, has yet been frequently observed to happen. But it is a miracle, that a dead man should come to life; because that has never been observed in any age or country.

As the evidence for a miracle is always limited, as miracles are single events, occurring at particular times and places, the evidence for the miracle will always be outweighed by the evidence against – the evidence for the law of which the miracle is supposed to be a transgression.

There are, however, two ways in which this argument might be neutralised. First, if the number of witnesses of the miracle be greater than the number of witnesses of the operation of the law, and secondly, if a witness be completely reliable (for then no amount of contrary testimony will be enough to outweigh that person's account). Hume therefore lays out, in the second part of section X, a number of reasons that we have for never holding this condition to have been met. He first claims that no miracle has in fact had enough witnesses of sufficient honesty, intelligence, and education. He goes on to list the ways in which human beings lack complete reliability:

- People are very prone to accept the unusual and incredible, which excite agreeable passions of surprise and wonder.
- Those with strong religious beliefs are often prepared to give evidence that they know is false, "with the best intentions in the world, for the sake of promoting so holy a cause".
- People are often too credulous when faced with such witnesses, whose apparent honesty and eloquence (together with the psychological effects of the marvellous described earlier) may overcome normal scepticism.
- Miracle stories tend to have their origins in "ignorant and barbarous nations" – either elsewhere in the world or in a civilised nation's past. The history of every culture displays a pattern of development from a wealth of supernatural events – "[p]rodigies, omens, oracles, judgements"– which steadily decreases over time, as the culture grows in knowledge and understanding of the world.

Hume ends with an argument that is relevant to what has gone before, but which introduces a new theme: the argument from miracles. He points out that many different religions have their own miracle stories. Given that there is no reason to accept some of them but not others (aside from a prejudice in favour of one religion), then we must hold all religions to have been proved true – but given the fact that religions contradict each other, this cannot be the case.

== Criticism ==
R. F. Holland has argued that Hume's definition of "miracle" need not be accepted, and that an event need not violate a natural law in order to be accounted miraculous, though as J.C.A. Gaskin has pointed out, other definitions of miracles make them fall under the order of nature, and then they would be subject to Hume's critique of the Teleological Argument. It has been argued by critics such as the Presbyterian minister George Campbell, that Hume's argument is circular. That is, he rests his case against belief in miracles upon the claim that laws of nature are supported by exceptionless testimony, but testimony can only be accounted exceptionless if we discount the occurrence of miracles. The philosopher John Earman has argued that Hume's argument is "largely unoriginal and chiefly without merit where it is original", citing Hume's lack of understanding of the probability calculus as a major source of error. Hume scholars were nearly unanimous in rejecting Earman's account, however. Fogelin and Vanderburgh show in detail how Earman and other critics have made serious errors in interpreting Hume's account of miracles and his treatment of evidential probability. J. P. Moreland and William Lane Craig agree with Earman's basic assessment and have critiqued Hume's argument against being able to identify miracles by stating that Hume's theory "fails to take into account all the probabilities involved" and "he incorrectly assumes that miracles are intrinsically highly improbable".

C. S. Lewis echoes Campbell's sentiment in his book Miracles: A Preliminary Study, when he argues that Hume begins by begging the question. He says that Hume's initial proposition — that laws of nature cannot be broken — is effectively the same question as 'Do miracles occur?'.

== See also ==
- Sagan standard
