= Argument from religious experience =

Argument for the existence of God

The argument from religious experience is an argument for the existence of God. It holds that the best explanation for religious experiences is that they constitute genuine experience or perception of a divine reality. Various reasons have been offered for and against accepting this contention.

Contemporary defenders of the argument are Richard Swinburne, William Alston, Alvin Plantinga, and Alister Hardy.

== Outline ==
In essence, the argument's structure is as follows:

1. There are compelling reasons for believing that claims of religious experience point to and validate spiritual realities that exist in a way that transcends material manifestation;
2. According to materialism, nothing exists in a way that transcends material manifestation;
3. According to classical theism, God endows human beings with the ability to perceive – although imperfectly – religious, spiritual and/or transcendent realities through religious, spiritual and/or transcendent experience.
4. To the extent that premise 1 is accepted, therefore, theism is more plausible than materialism.

As statements 2 to 4 are generally treated as uncontroversial, discussion has tended to focus on the status of the first.

=== Suggested reasons for accepting the premise ===
Some principal arguments that have been made in favor of the premise include:

- Very substantial numbers of ordinary people report having had such experiences, though this isn't to say that religious believers aren't ordinary. Such experiences are reported in almost all known cultures.
- These experiences often have very significant effects on people's lives, frequently inducing in them acts of extreme self-sacrifice well beyond what could be expected from evolutionary arguments.
- These experiences often seem very real to the people involved, and are quite often reported as being shared by a number of people. Although mass delusions are not inconceivable, one needs compelling reasons for invoking this as an explanation.
- Swinburne suggests that, as two basic principles of rationality, we ought to believe that things are as they seem unless and until we have evidence that they are mistaken (principle of credulity), and that those who do not have an experience of a certain type ought to believe others who say that they do in the absence of evidence of deceit or delusion (principle of testimony) and thus, although if you have a strong reason to disbelieve in the existence of God you will discount these experiences, in other cases such evidence should count towards the existence of God.

=== Suggested reasons for disputing the premise ===
On the other hand, the following reasons have been offered for rejecting the premise:

- Religious experiences might be mis-firings of evolved mechanisms selected for very different reasons.
- Some religious experiences are believed to have occurred only on the basis of religious texts such as the Bible, but these texts are of disputable historical accuracy.
- It is conceivable that some claimed religious experiences are lies, possibly done for attention or acceptance.
- Argument from inconsistent revelations: Different people have had, or believed to have had, religious experiences pointing to the truth of different religions. Not all of these can be correct. Kraemer highlighted a link between arguments of religious experience and self-righteousness (perception of superiority over those who do not receive providence). In Waking Up: A Guide to Spirituality Without Religion, New Atheist author Sam Harris assigns great value to religious experiences, but denies that facts about the cosmos can rationally be inferred from them, highlighting how different religions would give incompatible interpretations of the experiences.
- It has been argued that religious experiences are hallucinations aimed at fulfilling basic psychological desires of immortality, purpose, etc. Sigmund Freud, for example, considered God to be simply a psychological "illusion" created by the mind, instead of an actual existing entity. This argument can be based upon the fact that since we know about some believers for whom this argument is correct (their reports for religious experiences are nothing more than illusions), we assume that perhaps all such reports may be illusions.

== Alternate formulations ==
American analytic philosophers Alvin Plantinga and William Alston developed arguments for accepting knowledge gained from religious experience based on drawing analogies with knowledge gained from sense experience. In both cases they apply their arguments to Christian religious experiences, but accept that they may equally apply to other religious experiences.

Plantinga argues that just as the knowledge gained from sense experience is regarded as properly basic despite being unsupported based on foundationalism in the mould of Descartes, religious experiences should be accepted as providing properly basic knowledge of God.

Alston argues that if sets of practices used to form beliefs produce conclusions that are coherent over time both internally and with other belief-forming practices, they should be accepted. He argues this is the only way our ordinary beliefs are justified, and that by the same criteria belief based on Christian religious experience is justified, even though by this logic the belief in any religion or deity is justified, for example the flying spaghetti monster.

== See also ==
- Rational mysticism
- The Varieties of Religious Experience by William James
- Rudolf Otto
