= Sensus divinitatis =

Term for an alleged human sense for God

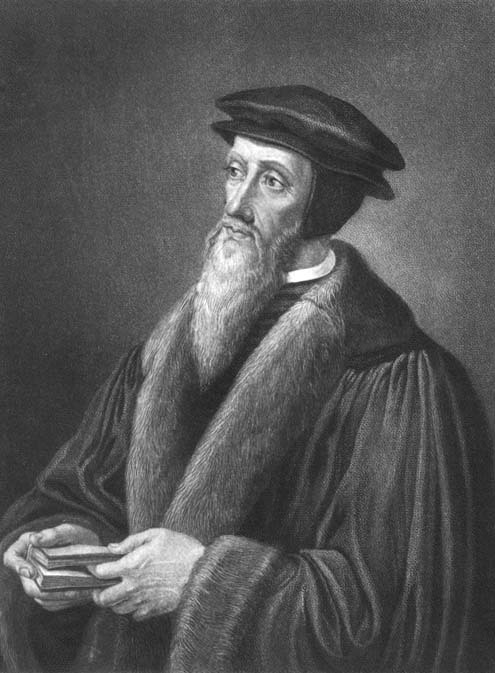
John Calvin

Sensus divinitatis (Latin for "sense of divinity"), also referred to as sensus deitatis ("sense of deity") or semen religionis ("seed of religion"), is a term first employed by French Protestant reformer John Calvin to describe a postulated human sense. Instead of knowledge of the environment (as with, for example, smell or sight), the sensus divinitatis is believed to give humans a knowledge of God.

== History ==
In Calvin's view, there is no reasonable non-belief:

That there exists in the human mind and indeed by natural instinct, some sense of Deity [sensus divinitatis], we hold to be beyond dispute, since God himself, to prevent any man from pretending ignorance, has endued all men with some idea of his Godhead…. …this is not a doctrine which is first learned at school, but one as to which every man is, from the womb, his own master; one which nature herself allows no individual to forget.

A view also put forward in the early church at times when a divine understanding of the world was much more prevalent. A paragraph in the first chapter in the Epistle to the Romans by apostle Paulus can be interpreted as alluding to this sense (or just any form of general revelation, alternativly e.g. by observation and reasoning).

Jonathan Edwards, the 18th-century American Calvinist preacher and theologian, claimed that while every human being has been granted the capacity to know God, a sense of divinity, successful use of these capacities requires an attitude of "true benevolence". Analytic philosopher Alvin Plantinga of the University of Notre Dame gives a definition of a similar modified form of the sensus divinitatis in his Reformed epistemology understanding as "a natural, inborn sense of [...] divinity, that is the [...] source of the world’s religions" and an additional way of God to make him known beside Scripture and testimonies. He further posits that all have the sense, only it does not work properly in some humans, due to sin's noetic effects.

Roman Catholic theologian Karl Rahner proposed an innate sense or pre-apprehension of God, which has been noted to share elements in common with Calvin's Sensus Divinitatis. This concept of innate knowledge of God is similar to the Islamic concept of Fitra.

Neo-Calvinists who adhere to the presuppositionalist school of Christian apologetics sometimes appeal to a sensus divinitatis to argue that there are no genuine atheists.

Research in the cognitive science of religion suggests that the human brain has a natural and evolutionary predisposition towards theistic beliefs, which Kelly James Clark argues is empirical evidence for the presence of a sensus divinitatis.

== Criticism ==
Philosopher Evan Fales presents three arguments against the presence of a sensus divinitatis:

1. The divergence of claims and beliefs (lack of reliability, even within Christian sects).
2. The lack of demonstrably superior morality of Christians versus non-Christians.
3. Bible verses, accepted by most Christians as authored by men inspired by the Holy Spirit—presumably with a functioning sensus divinitatis—in which "God performs, commands, accepts or countenances rape, genocide, human sacrifice, pestilence to punish David for taking a census, killing David's infant to punish him, hatred of family, capital punishment for breaking a monetary promise, and so on".

Philosopher Steven Maitzen claimed in 2006 that the demographics of religious belief make the existence of the sensus divinitatis unlikely, as this sense appears so unevenly distributed. However, Maitzen may have confused Aquinas's sensus dei with sensus divinitatis—sensus divinitatis (a religious sense) only necessitates a core religious/faith component to one's beliefs, whereas the sensus dei aims at a natural knowledge of God.

Hans Van Eyghen argues that the phenomenology of the "sensus divinitatis" conflicts with findings from the cognitive science of religion:

Alvin Plantinga posits a distinct, god-given faculty for belief, but results in cognitive science instead explains religious belief as arising from ordinary social cognition, similar to belief in other minds. Van Eyghen cites alternative accounts such as hyperactive agent detection and emotional attachment, which allows an interpretion of religion as a byproduct of general cognitive processes. He further argues that a "sensus divinitatis" is unnecessary, as a deity could reveal itself more directly. The research he cites indicates that beliefs about agency and morality develop through interaction with perceived agents. Here perception precedees cognition, making the link between effect and supposed cause more direct, suggesting a explanatorily redundancy for a distinct religious faculty.
