= Argument from love =

Argument for the existence of God

The argument from love is an argument for the existence of God that suggests the depth, complexity, and universality of love point to a transcendent source or purpose.

== Arguments from love to the existence of God ==
Tom Wright suggests that materialist philosophy and scepticism has "paved our world with concrete, making people ashamed to admit that they have had profound and powerful 'religious' experiences". The reality of Love in particular ("that mutual and fruitful knowing, trusting and loving which was the creator's intention" but which "we often find so difficult") and the whole area of human relationships in general, are another signpost pointing away from this philosophy to the central elements of the Christian story. Wright contends both that the real existence of love is a compelling reason for the truth of theism and that the ambivalent experience of love, ("marriages apparently made in heaven sometimes end not far from hell") resonates particularly with the Christian account of fall and redemption.

Paul Tillich suggested (in 1954) even Spinoza "elevates love out of the emotional into the ontological realm. And it is well known that from Empedocles and Plato to Augustine and Pico, to Hegel and Schelling, to Existentialism and depth psychology, love has played a central ontological role." and that "love is being in actuality and love is the moving power of life" and that an understanding of this should lead us to "turn from the naive nominalism in which the modern world lives".

The theologian Michael Lloyd suggests that "In the end there are basically only two possible sets of views about the universe in which we live. It must, at heart, be either personal or impersonal... arbitrary and temporary [or emerging] from relationship, creativity, delight, love".

Catholic philosopher Peter Kreeft summarises the argument as "Love is the greatest of miracles. How could an evolved ape create the noble idea of self-giving love? Human love is a result of our being made to resemble God, who himself is love. If we are made in the image of King Kong rather than in the image of King God, where do the saints come from?" Philosopher Alvin Plantinga expressed the argument in similar terms.

According to Graham Ward, postmodern theology portrays how religious questions are opened up (not closed down or annihilated) by postmodern thought. The postmodern God is emphatically the God of love, and the economy of love is kenotic.

== Variants ==
=== Comparative rationality of belief in God and Love ===
A variant on the argument is a defence of the rationality of theism by comparing faith in God with love, and to suggest that if it isn't irrational to love someone then it shouldn't be seen as irrational to believe in God. The philosopher Roger Scruton suggests: "Rational argument can get us just so far...It can help us to understand the real difference between a faith that commands us to forgive our enemies, and one that commands us to slaughter them. But the leap of faith itself—this placing of your life at God's service—is a leap over reason's edge. This does not make it irrational, any more than falling in love is irrational."

=== Suggested compelling nature of God's Love ===
Another variant of the argument is that the evidence for God's love is sufficiently compelling that people can reasonably believe in it, and hence a fortiori believe in God.
