= Argument from miracles =

Argument for the existence of God

The argument from miracles is an argument for the existence of God that begins by asserting that there are kinds of possible events the best explanation for which would be supernatural agency, if the existence of these events are first assumed. Traditionally, events of the relevant kind are known as miracles. All the argument requires is that miracles be such that the best explanations for them invoke supernatural agency.

Defenders of the argument include C. S. Lewis, Richard Swinburne, Gary Habermas, William Paley, and Samuel Clarke.

== Versions of the argument ==
=== Deductive argument from miracles ===
One deductive argument is proposed by William Paley broadly modeled on the version given by Richard Whately:

1. All miracles attested by persons, claiming to have witnessed them, who pass their lives in labors, dangers, and sufferings in support of their statements, and who, in consequence of their belief, submit to new rules of conduct, are worthy of credit.
2. The central Christian miracles are attested by such evidence.
3. The central Christian miracles are worthy of credit.

=== Explanatory argument from miracles ===
Another approach to arguing for a miracle claim is to argue that it is the best explanation for a small set of widely conceded facts. A typical “minimal facts” argument for the resurrection of Jesus starts with a list of facts such as these:

1. Jesus died by crucifixion.
2. His disciples afterward reported experiences which they believed were actually appearances of the risen Jesus.
3. The disciples were transformed from fearful cowards into bold proclaimers who were willing to face persecution and death for their message.
4. Paul, who had previously been a persecutor of the Christians, had an experience that he also believed was an appearance of the risen Jesus.

None of these four facts are supernatural claims in and of themselves. The argument maintains that virtually all critical scholars with the appropriate expertise accept these facts, relying on standard historical methods and reasoning. The explanatory argument begins with this broad scholarly consensus, asserting that all alternative explanations for these facts fall short when compared to the one that asserts Jesus truly rose from the dead. As a result, the conclusion is usually presented in a definitive and categorical manner, claiming that the resurrection explanation is the most compelling.

One key advantage of this approach is that it explicitly contrasts the resurrection hypothesis with other potential explanations. By doing so, the argument directly engages with alternative interpretations of the data, addressing them head-on.

=== Bayesian argument from miracles ===
Another approach to arguing for a miracle claim involves using Bayesian probability to argue that certain facts or sets of facts make the conclusion more probable. In the case of a categorical argument, this would mean showing that the conclusion is probable given the facts in question. For a confirmatory argument, the aim would be to demonstrate that the conclusion is significantly more probable when these facts are taken into account, compared to what it would be without them. This kind of argument could be structured in a categorical manner by employing the odds form of Bayes's Theorem, which allows for a formal, quantitative comparison of probabilities in relation to the available evidence. Several criticisms have been presented against this argument.

== External sources ==
- "Miracles". Internet Encyclopedia of Philosophy.
- "Miracles". Stanford Encyclopedia of Philosophy.
