= Lewis's trilemma =

Apologetic argument for the divinity of Jesus

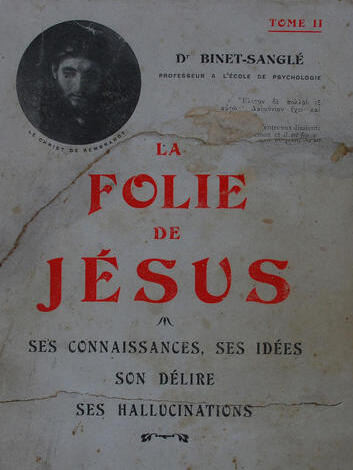
Mad: title page of Charles Binet-Sanglé's The Madness of Jesus

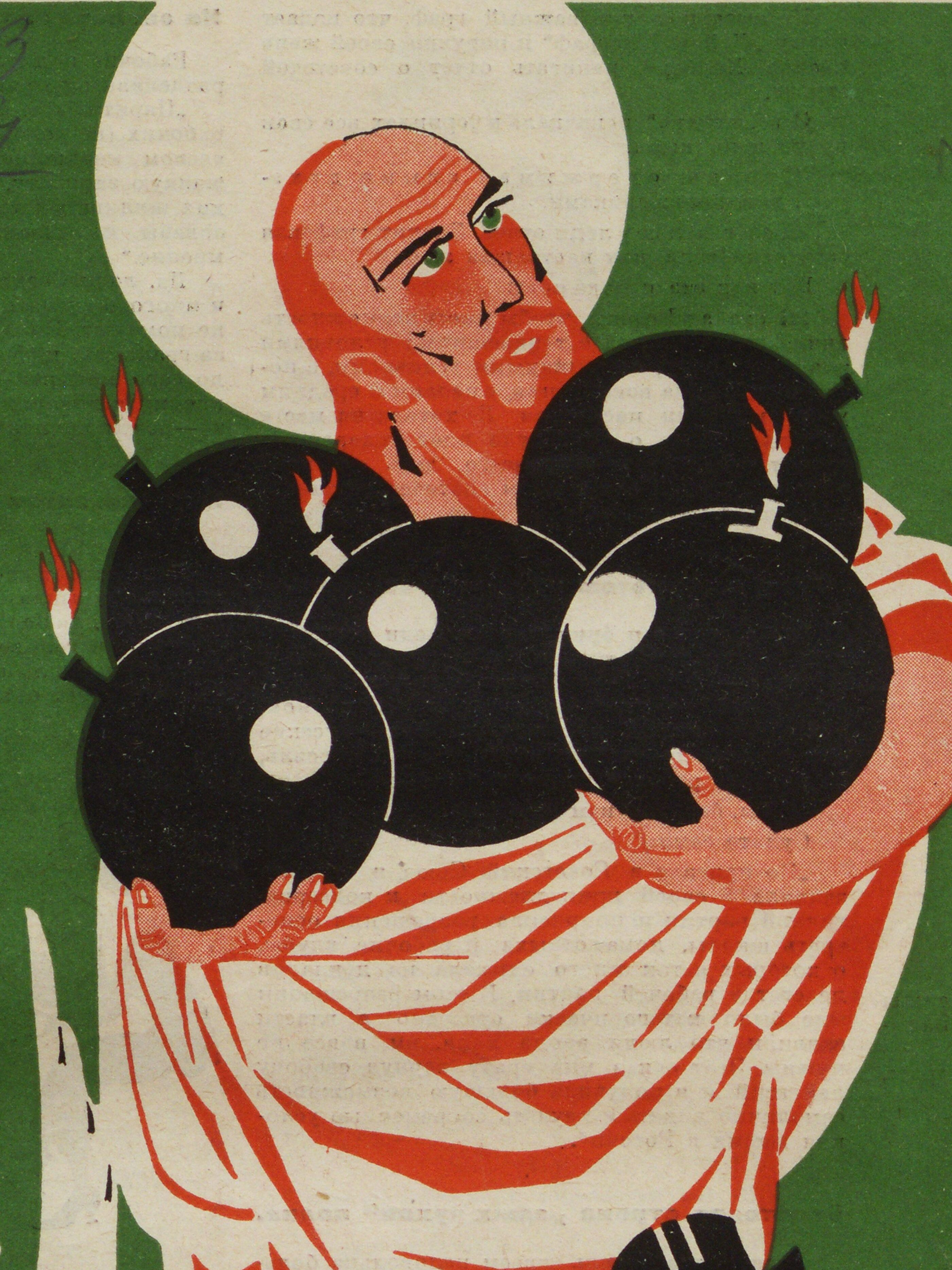
Bad: Jesus depicted as a warmonger by Bezbozhnik u Stanka

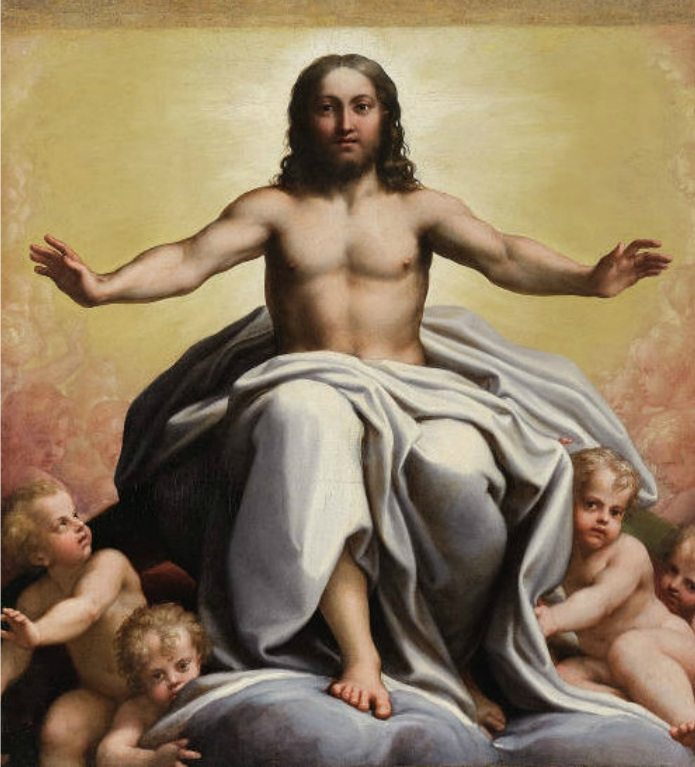
God: Christ In Glory by Antonio da Correggio

Lewis's trilemma is an apologetic argument traditionally used to argue for the divinity of Jesus by postulating that the only alternatives are that he was evil or mad. One version was popularised by University of Oxford literary scholar and writer C. S. Lewis in a BBC radio talk and in his writings. It is sometimes described as the "Lunatic, Liar, or Lord", or "Mad, Bad, or God" argument. It takes the form of a trilemma—a choice among three options, each of which is in some way difficult to accept.

A form of the argument can be found as early as 1846, and many other versions of the argument preceded Lewis's formulation in the 1940s. The argument has played an important part in Christian apologetics. Criticisms of the argument have included that it assumes that Jesus claimed to be God, while biblical scholars who wrote books about the historical Jesus agree that "Jesus did not spend his ministry declaring himself to be divine", and that it is logically unsound since it presents an incomplete set of options.

== History ==
This argument has been used in various forms throughout church history. It was used by the American preacher Mark Hopkins in Lectures on the Evidences of Christianity (1846), a book based on lectures delivered in 1844. Another early use of this approach was by the Scottish preacher "Rabbi" John Duncan (1796–1870), around 1859–1860. He stated:

"Christ either deceived mankind by conscious fraud, or He was Himself deluded and self-deceived, or He was Divine. There is no getting out of this trilemma. It is inexorable."

J. Gresham Machen used a similar line of argument in fifth chapter of his famous work Christianity and Liberalism (1923). There, Machen says:

"The real trouble is that the lofty claim of Jesus, if ... the claim was unjustified, places a moral stain upon Jesus' character. What shall be thought of a human being who lapsed so far from the path of humility and sanity as to believe the eternal destinies of the world were committed into his hands? The truth is that if Jesus be merely an example, he is not a worthy example for he claimed to be far more."

Among others who used this approach were N. P. Williams, R. A. Torrey, and W. E. Biederwolf. The writer G. K. Chesterton used something similar to the trilemma in his book, The Everlasting Man (1925), which Lewis cited in 1962 as the second book that most influenced him.

== Lewis's formulation ==
Lewis was an Oxford medieval literature scholar, popular writer, Christian apologist, and former atheist. He used the argument outlined below in a series of BBC radio talks later published as the book Mere Christianity. There, he states:

"I am trying here to prevent anyone saying the really foolish thing that people often say about Him: I'm ready to accept Jesus as a great moral teacher, but I don't accept his claim to be God. That is the one thing we must not say. A man who was merely a man and said the sort of things Jesus said would not be a great moral teacher. He would either be a lunatic—on the level with the man who says he is a poached egg—or else he would be the Devil of Hell. You must make your choice. Either this man was, and is, the Son of God, or else a madman or something worse. You can shut him up for a fool, you can spit at him and kill him as a demon or you can fall at his feet and call him Lord and God, but let us not come with any patronizing nonsense about his being a great human teacher. He has not left that open to us. He did not intend to. ... Now it seems to me obvious that He was neither a lunatic nor a fiend: and consequently, however strange or terrifying or unlikely it may seem, I have to accept the view that He was and is God."

Lewis, who had spoken extensively on Christianity to Royal Air Force personnel, was aware that many ordinary people did not believe Jesus was God but saw him rather as "a 'great human teacher' who was deified by his superstitious followers"; his argument is intended to overcome this. It is based on a traditional assumption that, in his words and deeds, Jesus was asserting a claim to be God. For example, in Mere Christianity, Lewis refers to what he says are Jesus's claims:

- to have authority to forgive sins—behaving as if "He was the party chiefly concerned, the person chiefly offended in all offences"
- to have always existed; and
- to intend to come back to judge the world at the end of time.

Lewis implies that these amount to a claim to be God and argues that they logically exclude the possibility that Jesus was merely "a great moral teacher", because he believes no ordinary human making such claims could possibly be rationally or morally reliable. Elsewhere, he refers to this argument as "the aut Deus aut malus homo" ("either God or a bad man"), a reference to an earlier version of the argument used by Henry Parry Liddon in his 1866 Bampton Lectures, in which Liddon argued for the divinity of Jesus based on a number of grounds, including the claims he believed Jesus made.

=== In Narnia ===
A version of this argument appears in Lewis's fantasy novel The Lion, the Witch and the Wardrobe. When Lucy and Edmund return from Narnia (her second visit and his first), Edmund tells Peter and Susan that he was playing along with Lucy and pretending they went to Narnia. Peter and Susan believe Edmund and are worried that Lucy might be mentally ill, so they seek out the Professor whose house they are living in. After listening to them explain the situation and asking them some questions, he responds:

"'Logic!' said the Professor half to himself. 'Why don't they teach logic at these schools? There are only three possibilities. Either your sister is telling lies, or she is mad, or she is telling the truth. You know she doesn't tell lies and it is obvious she is not mad. For the moment then, and unless any further evidence turns up, we must assume she is telling the truth.'"

== Influence ==
=== Christian ===
The trilemma has continued to be used in Christian apologetics since Lewis, notably by writers like Josh McDowell. Philosopher Peter Kreeft describes the trilemma as "the most important argument in Christian apologetics", and it forms a major part of the first talk in the Alpha Course and the book based on it, Questions of Life by Nicky Gumbel, an English Anglican priest. Ronald Reagan used this argument in 1978, in a written reply to a liberal Methodist minister who said that he did not believe Jesus was the son of God. A variant has also been quoted by Bono. The Lewis version was cited by Charles Colson as the basis of his conversion to Christianity. Stephen Davis, a supporter of Lewis and of this argument, argues that it can show belief in the incarnation as rational. The biblical scholar Bruce M. Metzger argued: "It has often been pointed out that Jesus' claim to be the only Son of God is either true or false. If it is false, he either knew the claim was false or he did not know that it was false. In the former case (2) he was a liar; in the latter case (3) he was a lunatic. No other conclusion beside these three is possible."

=== Non-Christian ===
The atheist writer Christopher Hitchens accepts Lewis's analysis of the options but reaches the opposite conclusion that Jesus was not good. He writes: "I am bound to say that Lewis is more honest here. Absent a direct line to the Almighty and a conviction that the last days are upon us, how is it 'moral' ... to claim a monopoly on access to heaven, or to threaten waverers with everlasting fire, let alone to condemn fig trees and persuade devils to infest the bodies of pigs? Such a person if not divine would be a sorcerer and a fanatic."

== Criticism ==
Writing of the argument's "almost total absence from discussions about the status of Jesus by professional theologians and biblical scholars", Stephen T. Davis comments that it is "often severely criticized, both by people who do and by people who do not believe in the divinity of Jesus".

=== Jesus' claims to divinity ===
The argument relies on the assumption that Jesus claimed to be God, something that most biblical scholars and historians do not believe to be true. A frequent criticism is that Lewis's trilemma depends on the veracity of the scriptural accounts of Jesus's statements and miracles. The trilemma rests on the interpretation of New Testament authors' depiction of the life of Jesus; a widespread objection is that the statements by Jesus recorded in the Gospels are being misinterpreted, and do not constitute claims to divinity. According to the biblical scholar Bart D. Ehrman, it is historically inaccurate that Jesus called himself God, so Lewis's premise of accepting that very claim is problematic. Ehrman stated that it is a mere legend that the historical Jesus called himself God, and that this was unknown to Lewis since he never was a professional Bible scholar.

In Honest to God, John A. T. Robinson, then Bishop of Woolwich, criticizes Lewis's approach, questioning the idea that Jesus intended to claim divinity: "It is, indeed, an open question whether Jesus claimed to be Son of God, let alone God". John Hick, writing in 1993, argued that this "once popular form of apologetic" was ruled out by changes in New Testament studies, citing "broad agreement" that scholars do not today support the view that Jesus claimed to be God, quoting as examples Michael Ramsey (1980), C. F. D. Moule (1977), James Dunn (1980), Brian Hebblethwaite (1985), and David Brown (1985). Larry Hurtado, who argues that the followers of Jesus within a very short period developed an exceedingly high level of devotional reverence to Jesus, at the same time says that there is no evidence that Jesus himself demanded or received such cultic reverence. According to Gerd Lüdemann, the broad consensus among modern New Testament scholars is that the proclamation of the divinity of Jesus was a development within the earliest Christian communities.

Donald S. Williams wrote "It is unfair to take a paragraph aimed at a lay audience and complain that it is inadequate to deal with people who have a more sophisticated set of issues." Williams considers it accomplished apologetics due to the mere fact that it stirs debates. Williams rejects the consensus of mainstream Bible scholars as irrelevant for conservative believers. Hence, the apologetic argument is valid, since it convinces conservative Christians. Williams argues that, taking the Bible at face value, Jesus did claim to be God. Williams thinks that scholars who do not take the Bible at face value are naturalistic skeptics. Williams stated "Lewis did not present the Trilemma as a proof of the deity of Christ as such", i.e. Lewis just clarified the options.

=== Unsound logical form ===
Another criticism raised is that Lewis is creating a false trilemma by insisting that only three options are possible. Craig A. Evans writes that the "liar, lunatic, Lord" trilemma "makes for good alliteration, maybe even good rhetoric, but it is faulty logic". He proceeds to list several other alternatives: Jesus was Israel's messiah, simply a great prophet, or we do not really know who or what he was because the New Testament sources portray him inaccurately. Philosopher and theologian William Lane Craig has also criticized the argument for its incompleteness, suggesting “legend” as a fourth alternative that could be added and excluded. Philosopher John Beversluis comments that Lewis "deprives his readers of numerous alternate interpretations of Jesus that carry with them no such odious implications". Paul E. Little, in his 1967 work Know Why You Believe, expanded the argument into a tetralemma ("Lord, Liar, Lunatic or Legend"). This has also been done by Peter Kreeft and Ronald Tacelli, both Saint John's Seminary professors of philosophy at Boston College, who have also suggested a pentalemma, accommodating the option that Jesus was a guru, who believed himself to be God in the sense that everything is divine.

==== Lewis's response to the possibility that the Gospels are legends ====
Lewis used his own literary expertise in a 1950 essay, "What Are We to Make of Jesus?", to disagree with the possibility that the Gospels are legends. There, Lewis writes:

"Now, as a literary historian, I am perfectly convinced that whatever else the Gospels are they are not legends. I have read a great deal of legend and I am quite clear that they are not the same sort of thing. They are not artistic enough to be legends. From an imaginative point of view they are clumsy, they don't work up to things properly. Most of the life of Jesus is totally unknown to us, as is the life of anyone else who lived at that time, and no people building up a legend would allow that to be so. Apart from bits of the Platonic dialogues, there is no conversation that I know of in ancient literature like the Fourth Gospel. There is nothing, even in modern literature, until about a hundred years ago when the realistic novel came into existence."

=== Apologetic method ===
Writing from a presuppositional perspective, Richard L. Pratt Jr. has criticized the trilemma as expanded by Paul E. Little ("Lord, Liar, Lunatic or Legend") as being too reliant on human reason: "Instead of insisting on the necessity of repentance and faith as the ground for true knowledge, Little acts as if the unbeliever needs merely to be logical about Jesus' claims in order to arrive at the truth."

== See also ==
- Christological argument
- Christology
- Historicity of the Bible
- List of Jewish messiah claimants
- Mental health of Jesus
- Pious fraud
- Rejection of Jesus
