= Christian existentialism =

Existentialist approach to Christian theology

Christian existentialism is a theophilosophical movement which takes an existentialist approach to Christian theology. The school of thought is often traced back to the work of the Danish philosopher and theologian Søren Kierkegaard (1813–1855) who is widely regarded as the father of existentialism, which would make it the original formulation of existentialism.

== Kierkegaardian themes ==
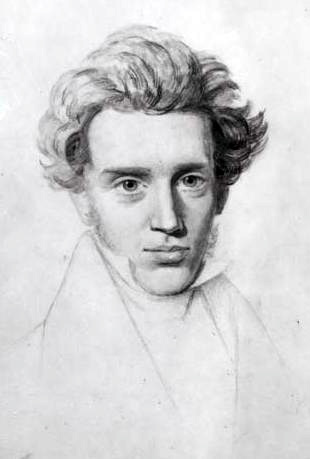
Søren Kierkegaard

Christian existentialism relies on Kierkegaard's understanding of Christianity. Kierkegaard addressed themes such as authenticity, anxiety, love, and the irrationality and subjectivity of faith, rejecting efforts to contain God in an objective, logical system. To Kierkegaard, the focus of theology was on the individual grappling with subjective truth rather than a set of objective claims – a point he demonstrated by often writing under pseudonyms that had different points of view. He contended that each person must make independent choices, which then constitute his or her existence. Each person suffers from the anguish of indecision (whether knowingly or unknowingly) until committing to a way to live. Kierkegaard posited three stages of human existence: the aesthetic, the ethical, and the religious, the latter coming after what is often called the leap of faith. Kierkegaard argued that the universe is fundamentally paradoxical, and that its greatest paradox is the transcendent union of God and humans in the person of Jesus Christ. He also posited having a personal relationship with God that supersedes all prescribed moralities, social structures and communal norms, since he asserted that following social conventions is essentially a personal aesthetic choice made by individuals.

== Major premises ==
One of the major premises of Kierkegaardian Christian existentialism entails calling the masses back to a more genuine form of Christianity. This form is often identified with some notion of Early Christianity, which mostly existed during the first three centuries after Christ's crucifixion. Beginning with the Edict of Milan, which was issued by Roman Emperor Constantine I in AD 313, Christianity enjoyed a level of popularity among Romans and later among other Europeans. And yet Kierkegaard asserted that by the 19th century, the ultimate meaning of New Testament Christianity (agape, mercy and loving-kindness) had become perverted, and Christianity had deviated considerably from its original threefold message of grace, humility, and love.

Another major premise of Kierkegaardian Christian existentialism involves Kierkegaard's conception of God and Love. For the most part, Kierkegaard equates God with Love. Thus, when a person engages in the act of loving, he is in effect achieving an aspect of the divine. Kierkegaard also viewed the individual as a necessary synthesis of both finite and infinite elements. Therefore, when an individual does not come to a full realization of his infinite side, he is said to be in despair. For many contemporary Christian theologians, the notion of despair can be viewed as sin. However, to Kierkegaard, a man sinned when he was exposed to this idea of despair and chose a path other than one in accordance with God's will.

A final major premise of Kierkegaardian Christian existentialism entails the systematic undoing of evil acts. Kierkegaard asserted that once an action had been completed, it should be evaluated in the face of God, for holding oneself up to divine scrutiny was the only way to judge one's actions. Because actions constitute the manner in which something is deemed good or bad, one must be constantly conscious of the potential consequences of his actions. Kierkegaard believed that the choice for goodness ultimately came down to each individual. Yet Kierkegaard also foresaw the potential limiting of choices for individuals who fell into despair.

== The Bible ==
Christian Existentialism often refers to what it calls the indirect style of Christ's teachings, which it considers to be a distinctive and important aspect of his ministry. Christ's point, it says, is often left unsaid in any particular parable or saying, to permit each individual to confront the truth on his own. This is particularly evident in (but is certainly not limited to) his parables; for example in the Gospel of Matthew (Matthew 18:21–35). A good example of indirect communication in the Old Testament is the story of David and Nathan in 2 Samuel 12:1–14.

An existential reading of the Bible demands that the reader recognize that he is an existing subject, studying the words that God communicates to him personally. This is in contrast to looking at a collection of truths which are outside and unrelated to the reader. Such a reader is not obligated to follow the commandments as if an external agent is forcing them upon him, but as though they are inside him and guiding him internally. This is the task Kierkegaard takes up when he asks: "Who has the more difficult task: the teacher who lectures on earnest things a meteor's distance from everyday life, or the learner who should put it to use?" Existentially speaking, the Bible doesn't become an authority in a person's life until they permit the Bible to be their personal authority.

== Notable Christian existentialists ==
In addition to Søren Kierkegaard, Christian existentialists include German Protestant theologians Paul Tillich and Rudolf Bultmann, American existential psychologist Rollo May (who introduced much of Tillich's thought to a general American readership), British Anglican theologian John Macquarrie, American philosopher Clifford Williams, French Catholic philosophers Maurice Blondel, Gabriel Marcel, Louis Lavelle, Emmanuel Mounier, Jacques Maritain and Pierre Boutang and French Protestant Paul Ricœur, German philosopher Karl Jaspers, Spanish philosopher Miguel de Unamuno, Russian philosophers Nikolai Berdyaev and Lev Shestov, and Greek Orthodoxy philosopher Christos Yannaras. Karl Barth added to Kierkegaard's ideas the notion that existential despair leads an individual to an awareness of God's infinite nature. Russian author Fyodor Dostoevsky could be placed within the tradition of Christian existentialism. Walker Percy, an American author from the twentieth century, gave Christian existentialist critique of contemporary society. "Walker Percy: Prophetic, Existentialist, Catholic Storyteller" (New Connections) by Rev. Robert E. Lauder (Author)

The roots of existentialism have been traced back as far as Augustine of Hippo. Some of the most striking passages in Pascal's Pensées, including the famous section on the wager, deal with existentialist themes. Jacques Maritain, in Existence and the Existent: An Essay on Christian Existentialism, finds the core of true existentialism in the thought of Thomas Aquinas.

== Existential theology ==
In the monograph, Existential Theology: An Introduction (2020), Hue Woodson provides a constructive primer to the field and, he argues, thinkers that can be considered more broadly as engaging with existential theology, defining a French school including Gabriel Marcel, Jacques Maritain, and Jean-Luc Marion, a German school including Friedrich Wilhelm Joseph Schelling, Georg Wilhelm Friedrich Hegel, and Dietrich Bonhoeffer, and a Russian school including Fyodor Dostoyevsky, Leo Tolstoy, and Nikolai Berdyaev.

== Radical existential Christianity ==
It has been claimed that radical existential Christians’ faith is based in their sensible and immediate and direct experience of God indwelling in human terms. It is suggested that individuals do not make or create their Christian existence; it does not come as a result of a decision one personally makes. The radical Protestants of the 17th century, like the Quakers, may have been in some ways theophilosophically aligned with radical existential Christianity.

== See also ==
- Antinomian controversy
- Atheistic existentialism
- Christian anarchism
- Christian existential apologetics
- Christian humanism
- Christian mysticism
- Christian philosophy
- Eastern Orthodox theology
- Fideism
- Free will in theology
- Gymnobiblism
- Jewish existentialism
- Meaning (existential)
- Neo-orthodoxy
- Postliberal theology
- Postmodern Christianity
- Presuppositional apologetics
- Secular theology
- Theoria
- Transcendentalism
