= Fideism =

Epistemological theory that faith is independent of reason

Fideism (/ˈfiːdeɪ.ɪzəm, ˈfaɪdiː-/ FEE-day-iz-əm, FY-dee-) is a standpoint or an epistemological theory which maintains that faith is independent of reason, or that reason and faith are hostile to each other and faith is superior at arriving at particular truths (see natural theology). The word fideism comes from fides, the Latin word for faith, and literally means "faith-ism". Philosophers have identified a number of different forms of fideism. Strict fideists hold that reason has no place in discovering theological truths, while moderate fideists hold that though some truth can be known by reason, faith stands above reason.

Theologians and philosophers have responded in various ways to the place of faith and reason in determining the truth of metaphysical ideas, morality, and religious beliefs. Historically, fideism is most commonly ascribed to four philosophers: Søren Kierkegaard, Blaise Pascal, William James, and Ludwig Wittgenstein; with fideism being a label applied in a negative sense by their opponents, but which is not always supported by their own ideas and works or followers. A qualified form of fideism is sometimes attributed to Immanuel Kant's famous suggestion that we must "deny knowledge in order to make room for faith".

== Overview ==
Alvin Plantinga defines "fideism" as "the exclusive or basic reliance upon faith alone, accompanied by a consequent disparagement of reason and is used especially in the pursuit of philosophical or religious truth". The fideist therefore "urges reliance on faith rather than reason, in matters philosophical and religious", and therefore may go on to disparage the claims of reason. (Note: Plantinga, Alvin (1983). "Reason and Belief in God" in Alvin Plantinga and Nicholas Wolterstorff (eds.), Faith and Rationality: Reason and Belief in God, page 87. (Notre Dame: University of Notre Dame Press).) The fideist seeks truth, above all, and affirms that reason cannot achieve certain kinds of truth, which must instead be accepted only by faith.

=== Theories of truth ===
The doctrine of fideism is consistent with some, and radically contrary to other theories of truth:

- Correspondence theory of truth
- Pragmatic theory of truth
- Constructivist epistemology
- Consensus theory of truth
- Coherence theory of truth
- Subjectivism

=== Tertullian ===
Tertullian taught fideistic concepts such as the later philosophers William of Ockham and Søren Kierkegaard. Tertullian's De Carne Christi (On the Flesh of Christ]) says "the Son of God died; it is by all means to be believed, because it is absurd."

On the other hand, some deny Tertullian's fideistic character, the statement "Credo quia absurdum" ("I believe because it is absurd") is sometimes cited as an example of views of the Church Fathers. However, this has been argued to have been a misquotation of Tertullian, saying that Tertullian was critiquing intellectual arrogance and the misuse of philosophy, but that he remained committed to reason and its usefulness in defending the faith.

=== William of Ockham ===
Ockham was a fideist, holding that belief in God is only a matter of faith and not from knowledge; this led him to deny all the alleged proofs of God.

=== Luther ===
Martin Luther taught that faith informs the Christian's use of reason. Regarding the mysteries of Christian faith, he wrote, "All the articles of our Christian faith, which God has revealed to us in His Word, are in presence of reason sheerly impossible, absurd, and false." And "Reason is the greatest enemy that faith has." However, Luther conceded that, grounded upon faith in Christ, reason can be used in its proper realm, as he wrote, "Before faith and the knowledge of God reason is darkness in divine matters, but through faith it is turned into a light in the believer and serves piety as an excellent instrument. For just as all natural endowments serve to further impiety in the godless, so they serve to further salvation in the godly. An eloquent tongue promotes faith; reason makes speech clear, and everything helps faith forward. Reason receives life from faith; it is killed by it and brought back to life."

=== Blaise Pascal and fideism ===
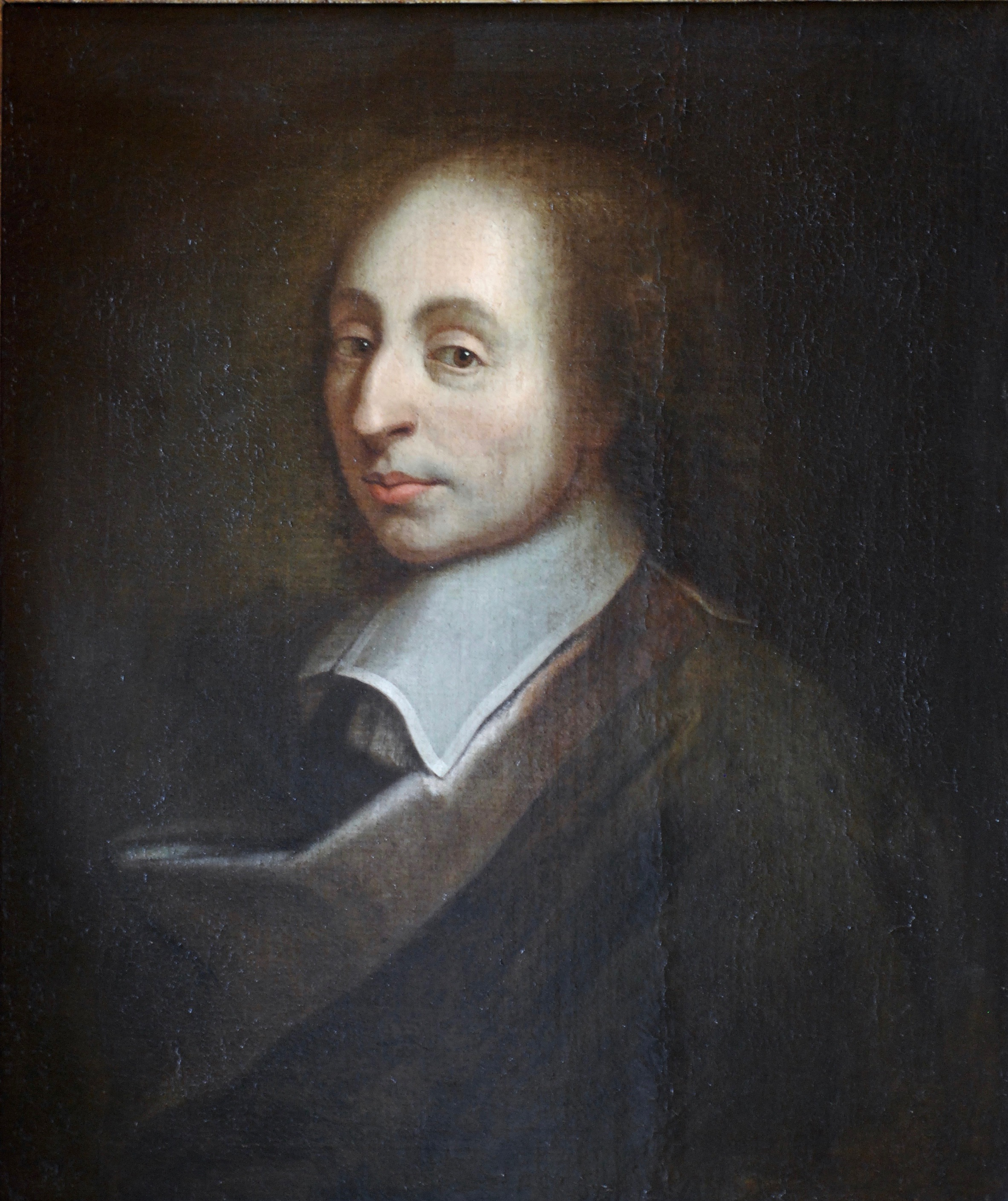
Blaise Pascal

Another form of fideism is assumed by Pascal's Wager, which is a rational argument for a pragmatic view of God's existence. Blaise Pascal invites the atheist considering faith to see faith in God as a cost-free choice that carries a potential reward. He argues that the existence of God cannot be determined by reason, but that everyone must nevertheless decide whether to believe or not. He reasons that in these conditions, one should consider what one stands to gain or lose: "... if you win you win everything, if you lose you lose nothing. Do not hesitate then; wager that he does exist."

Pascal, moreover, contests the various proposed proofs of the existence of God as irrelevant. Even if the proofs were valid, the beings they propose to demonstrate are not congruent with the deity worshiped by historical faiths, and can easily lead to deism instead of revealed religion: "The God of Abraham, Isaac, and Jacob—not the god of the philosophers!"

=== Hamann and fideism ===
Considered to be the father of modern antirationalism, Johann Georg Hamann promoted a view that elevated faith alone as the only guide to human conduct. Using the work of David Hume he argued that everything people do is ultimately based on faith. Without faith (for it can never be proven) in the existence of an external world, human affairs could not continue; therefore, he argued, all reasoning comes from this faith: it is fundamental to the human condition. Thus all attempts to base belief in God using reason are in vain. He attacks systems like Spinozism that try to confine what he feels is the infinite majesty of God into a finite human creation.

=== Kant's qualified fideism ===
Hamann was a personal friend of Immanuel Kant, one of the most influential philosophers of the modern era. While Kant and Hamann disagreed about both the use of reason and the scientific method, there were also a number of points of agreement between them. For instance, one of the views defended in Kant's Critique of Pure Reason is that reason is incapable of attaining knowledge of the existence of God or the immortality of the soul, a point with which Hamann would agree. The most important difference on this point is that Kant did not think that this gave way to antirationalism, whereas Hamann did. As a result, a qualified form of fideism is sometimes attributed to Kant. This modified form of fideism is also evident in his famous suggestion that we must "deny knowledge in order to make room for faith".

=== Kierkegaard ===
Natural theologians may argue that Kierkegaard was a fideist of this general sort: the argument that God's existence cannot be certainly known, and that the decision to accept faith is neither founded on, nor needs, rational justification, may be found in the writings of Søren Kierkegaard and his followers in Christian existentialism. Many of Kierkegaard's works, including Fear and Trembling, are under pseudonyms; they may represent the work of fictional authors whose views correspond to hypothetical positions, not necessarily those held by Kierkegaard himself.

In Fear and Trembling, Kierkegaard focused on Abraham's willingness to sacrifice Isaac. The New Testament apostles repeatedly argued that Abraham's act was an admirable display of faith. To the eyes of a non-believer, however, it must necessarily have appeared to be an unjustifiable attempted murder, perhaps the fruit of an insane delusion. Kierkegaard used this example to focus attention on the problem of faith in general. He ultimately affirmed that to believe in the incarnation of Christ, in God made flesh, was to believe in the "absolute paradox", since it implies that an eternal, perfect being would become a simple human. Reason cannot possibly comprehend such a phenomenon; therefore, one can only believe in it by taking a "leap of faith".

=== James and "will to believe" ===
American pragmatic philosopher and psychologist William James introduced his concept of the "will to believe" in 1896. Following upon his earlier theories of truth, James argued that some religious questions can only be answered by believing in the first place: one cannot know if religious doctrines are true without seeing if they work, but they cannot be said to work unless one believes them in the first place.

William James published many works on the subject of religious experience. His four key characteristics of religious experience are: 'passivity', 'ineffability', 'a noetic quality', and 'transiency'. Due to the fact that religious experience is fundamentally ineffable, it is impossible to hold a coherent discussion of it using public language. This means that religious belief cannot be discussed effectively, and so reason does not affect faith. Instead, faith is found through experience of the spiritual, and so understanding of belief is only gained through the practice of it.

=== Wittgenstein and fideism ===
The philosopher Ludwig Wittgenstein did not write systematically about religion, though he did lecture on the topic of religious belief (e.g., student notes published as "Lectures on Religious Belief"), and various remarks about religions appear in sources such as the "Remarks on Frazer's Golden Bough", his private diaries, in the collection Culture and Value, and in notes on conversations with former students and friends such as Maurice O'Connor Drury and Oets Kolk Bouwsma.

In his 1967 article, entitled "Wittgensteinian Fideism", Kai Nielsen argues that certain aspects of Wittgenstein's thought have been interpreted by Wittgensteinians in a "fideistic" manner. According to this position, religion is a self-contained—and primarily expressive—enterprise, governed by its own internal logic or "grammar". This view—commonly called Wittgensteinian fideism—states: that religion is logically cut off from other aspects of life; that religious concepts and discourse are essentially self-referential; and that religion cannot be criticized from an external (i.e., non-religious) point of view.

Wittgenstein stated that "Christianity is not based on historical truth; rather, it offers us a historical narrative and says: now believe! But not, believe this narrative with the belief appropriate to a historical narrative, rather: believe, through thick and thin". For Wittgenstein you should "not take the same attitude to it as you take to other historical narratives...there is nothing paradoxical about that!" and that "The historical accounts in the Gospel, might historically speaking, be demonstrably false yet belief would lose nothing by this".

=== Shestov ===
Lev Shestov is associated with radical fideism, holding that religious truth can only be gained by rejecting reason.

=== Fideism and presuppositional apologetics ===
Presuppositional apologetics is a Christian system of apologetics associated mainly with Calvinist Protestantism; it attempts to distinguish itself from fideism. It holds that all human thought must begin with the proposition that the revelation contained in the Bible is axiomatic, rather than transcendentally necessary, else one would not be able to make sense of any human experience (see also epistemic foundationalism). To non-believers who reject the notion that the truth about God, the world, and themselves can be found within the Bible, the presuppositional apologist attempts to demonstrate the incoherence of the epistemic foundations of the logical alternative by the use of what has come to be known as the "transcendental argument for God's existence" (TAG). On the other hand, some presuppositional apologists, such as Cornelius Van Til, believe that such a condition of true unbelief is impossible, claiming that all people actually believe in God (even if only on a subconscious level), whether they admit or deny it.

Presuppositional apologetics could be seen as being more closely allied with foundationalism than fideism, though it has sometimes been critical of both.

== Criticism ==
=== Fideism rejected by the Catholic Church ===
Catholic doctrine rejects fideism, with its earliest condemnations dating back to 1348. The Catechism of the Catholic Church, affirms that it is a Catholic doctrine that God's existence can indeed be demonstrated by reason.

The Anti-Modernist oath promulgated by Pope Pius X required Catholics to affirm that:

God, the origin and end of all things, can be known with certainty by the natural light of reason from the created world (cf. Rom. 1:20), that is, from the visible works of creation, as a cause from its effects, and that, therefore, his existence can also be demonstrated

Similarly, the Catechism of the Catholic Church teaches that:

Though human reason is, strictly speaking, truly capable by its own natural power and light of attaining to a true and certain knowledge of the one personal God, who watches over and controls the world by his providence, and of the natural law written in our hearts by the Creator; yet there are many obstacles which prevent reason from the effective and fruitful use of this inborn faculty. For the truths that concern the relations between God and man wholly transcend the visible order of things, and, if they are translated into human action and influence it, they call for self-surrender and abnegation. The human mind, in its turn, is hampered in the attaining of such truths, not only by the impact of the senses and the imagination, but also by disordered appetites which are the consequences of original sin. So it happens that men in such matters easily persuade themselves that what they would not like to be true is false or at least doubtful.

— Catechism of the Catholic Church, ss. 37

Pope John Paul II's encyclical Fides et Ratio also affirms that God's existence is in fact demonstrable by reason, and that attempts to reason otherwise are the results of sin. In the encyclical, John Paul II warned against "a resurgence of fideism, which fails to recognize the importance of rational knowledge and philosophical discourse for the understanding of faith, indeed for the very possibility of belief in God".

==== Fideist currents in Catholic thought ====
Another course of fideist thinking within the Catholic Church is the concept of "signs of contradiction". According to this belief, the holiness of certain people and institutions is confirmed by the fact that other people contest their claims: this opposition is held to be worthy of comparison to the opposition met by Jesus Christ himself. This opposition and contradiction does not inherently prove something is true in Catholic thought, but acts an additional possible indication of its truth. The idea of the sign of contradiction is related to the conviction that, while human reason is still operative, the distortion of fallen human nature causes some instances of reasoning to go astray.

=== As sin ===
Fideism has received criticism from theologians who argue that fideism is not a proper way to worship God. According to this position, if one does not attempt to understand what one believes, one is not really believing. "Blind faith" is not true faith. Notable articulations of this position include:

- Peter Abelard – Sic et Non
- Lord Herbert – De Veritate

=== As relativism ===
Some critics argue that fideism can lead to relativism.

=== A case for reason ===
Some critics note the successful use of reason in the daily lives of people to solve problems. That reason has led to an increase of knowledge, including in the sphere of science.

== See also ==
- Agnostic theism
- Apophatic theology
- Christian existential apologetics
- Christian existentialism
- Existence of God
- Liberal Christianity (contrast)
- Rational fideism
- Religious epistemology
- Scholasticism (contrast)
- Sola fide, the Protestant belief that Christians are saved by faith in Christ alone
