= Christian existential apologetics =

Christian existential apologetics differs from traditional approaches to Christian apologetics by basing arguments for Christian theism on the satisfaction of existential needs rather than on strictly logical or evidential arguments. Christian existential apologetics may also be distinguished from Christian existentialism and from experiential apologetics. The former is a philosophic outlook concerned with the human condition in general; the latter consists of evidential argumentation based on religious experience.

== Existential apologetics ==
Christian existential apologetics is "the demonstration that Christian faith is justified because it satisfies certain emotional and spiritual needs." It typically consists of "existential arguments for believing in God" that are expressed as follows:

1. Humans have certain "existential" needs. N. T. Wright lists four such needs: "the longing for justice, the quest for spirituality, the hunger for relationships, and the delight in beauty." Clifford Williams lists thirteen: "We need cosmic security. We need to know that we will live beyond the grave in a state that is free from the defects of this life, a state that is full of goodness and justice. We need a more expansive life, one in which we love and are loved. We need meaning, and we need to know that we are forgiven for going astray. We also need to experience awe, to delight in goodness and to be present with those we love."
2. Faith in God satisfies these needs.
3. Therefore, faith in God is justified.

Williams states that this argument is not the same as an evidential argument: "A person who is convinced of an existential argument says, 'I believe because I am satisfied when I do.' A person who is convinced of an evidential argument says, 'I believe because there is a good reason to do so.'" He also states that the argument is different from C. S. Lewis's argument from desire, which argues that there is an explanation of the source of the existential needs: "If I find in myself a desire which no experience in this world can satisfy, the most probable explanation is that I was made for another world."

== See also ==
- Christian apologetics
- Christian existentialism
- Existence of God
- Fideism
- Human nature
- Image of God
- Leap of faith
- Pascal's wager
- Pragmatism
- Religious epistemology
