= Presupposition (disambiguation) =

In linguistics, a presupposition of a statement is a proposition which must be true in order for the statement to make sense.

Presupposition may also refer to:

- Presupposition (philosophy), in epistemology, requirements for a belief system to make sense
- Presuppositional apologetics, argues that the existence or non-existence of God is the basic presupposition of all human thought

== See also ==
- Complex question, a fallacy
