= Josh McDowell =

American evangelist and author (born 1939)

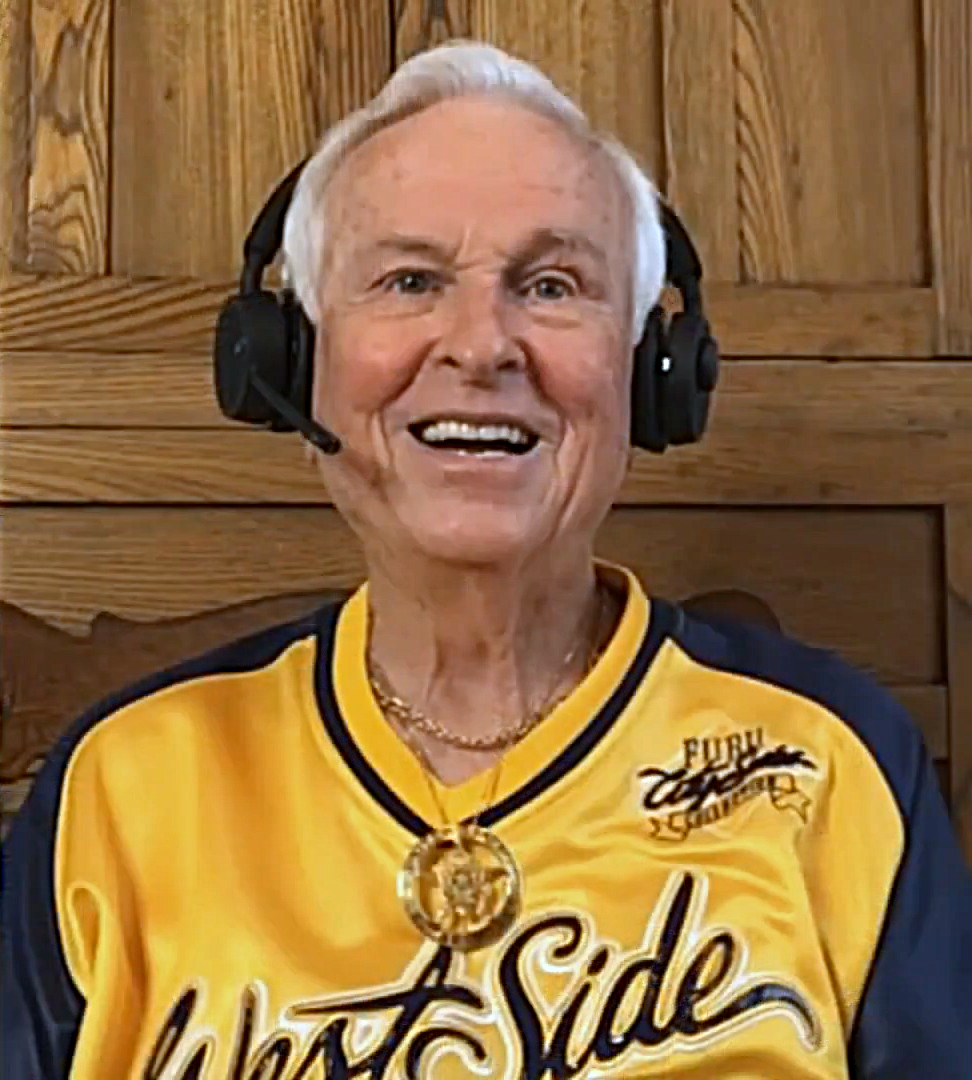
- McDowell in 2022
- Born: Joslin McDowell; August 17, 1939 (age 87); Union City, Michigan, U.S.
- Occupations: Writer, public speaker
- Writing career
- Genre: Christian literature
- Subject: Christian apologetics
- Website: www.josh.org

Joslin "Josh" McDowell (born August 17, 1939) is an American evangelical Christian apologist and evangelist. He is the author or co-author of over 150 books.

In 2006, his book Evidence That Demands a Verdict was ranked 13th in Christianity Today's list of most influential evangelical books published after World War II. Other well-known titles are More Than a Carpenter, A Ready Defense and Right from Wrong.

== Biography ==
=== Family and education ===
McDowell was born in Union City, Michigan, in 1939 with the given name Joslin. He is one of five children born to Wilmot McDowell. Biographer Joe Musser indicates that McDowell struggled with low self-esteem in his youth, as his father was an alcoholic and abusive. McDowell also revealed he was sexually abused repeatedly as a child by a farm hand, Wayne Bailey, from the age of 6 to 13. He enlisted in the Air National Guard, received basic training and assumed duties in mechanical maintenance of aircraft. After sustaining a head injury, he was discharged from the service.

He initially intended to pursue legal studies culminating in a political career, and began preparatory studies at Kellogg Community College, a two-year junior college in Battle Creek, Michigan. According to McDowell, he was an agnostic at college when he decided to prepare a paper that would examine the historical evidence of the Christian faith in order to disprove it. However, he converted to Christianity, after, as he says, he found evidence for it, not against it. He subsequently enrolled at Wheaton College, where he was awarded a Bachelor of Arts degree. He then studied at Talbot Theological Seminary of Biola University. He completed an exit paper examining the theology of Jehovah's Witnesses and was awarded the Master of Divinity degree, graduating magna cum laude.

Josh McDowell married Dottie Youd, with whom he has four children and ten grandchildren; they live in California. His son, Sean, is also a Christian apologist and associate professor at Biola University.

=== Career and ministry ===
In 1964, he became a traveling representative of Campus Crusade for Christ International, a parachurch ministry established by Bill Bright in the 1950s that operates student chapters on university and college campuses. He remains connected to the organization today.

McDowell's full-time ministry with Campus Crusade for Christ began with his appointment as a campus speaker in Latin America. He later returned to North America where he became known as an itinerant speaker addressing campus groups about the Christian faith.

Part of his speaking ministry has focused on youth issues in relationships and sexual mores and is reflected in seminars such as "Maximum Sex" and the "Why Wait?" campaign that encourages sexual abstinence before marriage. Other facets of his speaking ministry and writing have focused on issues of self-esteem (His Image, My Image), and developing faith and character (Evidence for Joy). In the 1980s he also coordinated a three-month residential discipleship program in a retreat center called The Julian Center, near San Diego.

=== Critical race theory comments ===
McDowell came under criticism for remarks he made on September 18, 2021, at the American Association of Christian Counselors World Conference. In discussing critical race theory, McDowell said, "I do not believe Blacks, African Americans, and many other minorities have equal opportunity. Why? Most of them grew up in families where there is not a big emphasis on education, security — you can do anything you want. You can change the world. If you work hard, you will make it. So many African Americans don't have those privileges like I was brought up with." McDowell apologized for his remarks the following day.

== Method of apologetics ==
As a practitioner of Christian apologetics, McDowell's writings have concentrated on addressing challenges to belief, questions posed by non-Christians, doubts about faith, and non-Christian religions. McDowell tends to present positive arguments to commend belief in Jesus Christ by emphasizing historical and legal proofs to establish the authenticity of the biblical texts and the divinity of Christ.

In books such as Evidence That Demands a Verdict, The Resurrection Factor, and He Walked Among Us, McDowell arranges his arguments by laying out a cumulative case of evidence, such as archaeological discoveries, the extant manuscripts of the biblical texts, fulfilled prophecies, and the miracle of the resurrection. In More Than A Carpenter he blends historical arguments with legal argumentation concerning the direct witness and circumstantial evidences for Jesus' life and resurrection. He employed a similar line of argument in his debate titled 'Was Christ Crucified?' with the South African Muslim Ahmed Deedat in Durban during August 1981. McDowell says that the "evidence for Christianity in the Scriptures is not exhaustive, but it is sufficient."

Other foci of his apologetics have included challenging the methodology, assumptions and conclusions drawn in higher criticism of the Old Testament and form and redaction criticism of the gospels. His work in this area has consisted of a popular summary of scholarly debate, particularly from Evangelical discussions about higher critical theories. In the late 1980s and into the 1990s, his apologetic writings interacted with challenges expressed in popular books like The Holy Blood and the Holy Grail, The Lost Years of Jesus, and the writings of the humanist George A. Wells.

He has also collated apologetic arguments concerning the doctrine of Christ's deity as in Jesus: A Biblical Defense of His Deity. In two companion volumes he and his colleague Don Stewart have addressed popular questions and objections to faith concerning biblical inerrancy and Bible discrepancies, Noah's Flood, and creation versus evolution.

McDowell and Stewart have also popularized the arguments of other apologists in the Christian countercult movement, particularly the work of Walter Martin, in the Handbook of Today's Religions. In their criticisms of cults and occult beliefs McDowell and Stewart concentrate on doctrinal apologetic questions, especially pertaining to the deity of Christ, and pointing out heretical beliefs in the religious groups they profile which they consider to be unorthodox.

McDowell's approach to apologetics falls under what Protestant theologians classify as "classical" and "evidential." In either of these approaches to Christian apologetics, it is assumed that arguments defending the Christian faith can legitimately be directed to both believers and unbelievers because the human mind is viewed as able to comprehend certain truths about God. Presuppositional apologetics, on the other hand, questions this methodology by arguing that since unbelievers partially suppress and resist the truth about God (as Paul states in Romans 1:18–20), the problem of unbelief is also an ethical choice and not simply a lack of evidence.

== Reception ==
According to Gail Eubanks, McDowell made controversial claims and he is preaching to the choir. His advice is to "abandon scientific rationality". Lesly F. Massey stated that McDowell's arguments are inadequate for comprehending the New Testament. McDowell did not win a place in the scholarly discussion. McDowell's utopia is "a state outlawing abortion, euthanasia, homosexual rights, and all pornography".

He engaged in "a misguided archaeological project" (destroying ancient mummy masks in search of New Testament manuscripts).

== Works by McDowell ==
- Evidence That Demands A Verdict, First published 1972. Revised Edition, Here's Life Publishers, San Bernardino, California, 1979.
- More Than A Carpenter, Tyndale House, Wheaton, Illinois, 1977.
- Daniel in the Critics' Den, Here's Life Publishers, San Bernardino, California, 1979.
- Answers to Tough Questions, with Don Stewart, Here's Life Publishers, San Bernardino, California, 1980.
- Givers, Takers and Other Kinds of Lovers, with Paul Lewis, Tyndale House, Wheaton, 1980.
- Reasons Skeptics Should Consider Christianity, with Don Stewart, Here's Life Publishers, San Bernardino, California, 1981.
- More Evidence That Demands A Verdict, Revised edition, Here's Life Publishers, San Bernardino, California, 1981.
- The Resurrection Factor, Here's Life Publishers, San Bernardino, California, 1981.
- Prophecy: Fact or Fiction, Here's Life Publishers, San Bernardino, California, 1981.
- The Myths of Sex Education, Here's Life Publishers, San Bernardino, California, 1981.
- Guide To Understanding Your Bible, Here's Life Publishers, San Bernardino, California, 1982.
- Understanding Secular Religions, Here's Life Publishers, San Bernardino, California, 1982.
- Understanding Non-Christian Religions, with Don Stewart, Here's Life Publishers, San Bernardino, California, 1982.
- The Islam Debate, with John Gilchrist, Here's Life Publishers, San Bernardino, California, 1983.
- Jesus: A Biblical Defense of His Deity, with Bart Larson, Here's Life Publishers, San Bernardino, California, 1983.
- Handbook of Today's Religions, with Don Stewart, Here's Life Publishers, San Bernardino, California, 1983.
- Evidence Growth Guide, Here's Life Publishers, San Bernardino, California, 1983.
- Evidence for Joy, with Dale Bellis, Word, Waco, 1984.
- His Image, My Image, Here's Life Publishers, San Bernardino, California, 1984.
- The Secret of Loving, Here's Life Publishers, San Bernardino, California, 1985.
- Why Wait? with Dick Day, Thomas Nelson Publishers, Nashville, 1987.
- How to Help Your Child Say "No" to Sexual Pressure, Word Books, 1987.
- He Walked Among Us: Evidence for the Historical Jesus, with Bill Wilson, Here's Life Publishers, San Bernardino, California, 1988.
- Skeptics Who Demanded a Verdict, Tyndale House, Wheaton, 1989.
- The Dad Difference, with Norm Wakefield, Here's Life Publishers, San Bernardino, California, 1989.
- A Ready Defense, Thomas Nelson, Nashville, Tennessee, 1990.
- The Occult, with Don Stewart and Kurt Van Gorden, Here's Life Publishers, San Bernardino, CA, 1992.
- Don't Check Your Brains at the Door, Concordia Publishing House, 1992.
- Right From Wrong, with Bob Hostetler, Word, Dallas, 1994.
- The Father Connection: 10 Qualities of the heart that empower your children to make right choices, B&H Books, Nashville Tennessee 1996.
- The Topsy-Turvy Kingdom, with Dottie McDowell and David Nathan Weiss, Tyndale for Kids, 1996.
- The One Year Book of Josh McDowell's Youth Devotions, with Bob Hostetler, Tyndale House, Wheaton, 1997.
- New Evidence That Demands A Verdict, Word, Nashville, 1999.
- See yourself as God sees you, Tyndale House Publishers, Wheaton, Illinois, 1999.
- Disconnected Generation: Saving Our Youth From Self-Destruction, Word, Nashville, 2000.
- Beyond Belief to Convictions, with Bob Hostetler, Tyndale House, Wheaton, 2002.
- The Last Christian Generation, Green Key Books, Holiday, Florida, 2006.
- The Da Vinci Code: A Quest For Answers, Green Key Books, Holiday, Florida, 2006. (free PDF book, 112 pp, ISBN 1-932587-80-2)
- Evidence for the Resurrection, Regal Books, Ventura, California, 2009.
- More Than A Carpenter, Tyndale, Wheaton, Illinois, 2009.
- The Unshakable Truth: How You Can Experience the 12 Essentials of a Relevant Faith, Harvest House Publishers, 2010.
- Evidence for the Historical Jesus: A Compelling Case for His Life and His Claims, Harvest House Publishers, 2011.
- The Awesome Book of Bible Answers for Kids, with Kevin Johnson, 2011.
- 77 FAQs About God and the Bible: Your Toughest Questions Answered, with Sean McDowell, 2012.
- Straight Talk with Your Kids About Sex, with Dottie McDowell, 2012.
- The Bible Handbook of Difficult Verses: A Complete Guide to Answering the Tough Questions, with Sean McDowell, 2013.
- Understanding Islam and Christianity: Beliefs That Separate Us and How to Talk About Them, with Jim Walker, 2013.
- 10 Commitments for Dads: How to Have an Awesome Impact on Your Kids, 2014.
- 10 Ways to Say "I Love You": Embracing a Love That Lasts, 2015.
- The Beauty of Intolerance: Setting a Generation Free to Know Truth and Love, with Sean McDowell, 2016.

== Related works ==
- Undaunted - The Early Life of Josh McDowell, 65 minute documentary written and directed by Cristóbal Krusen, 2011.
- Josh: The Excitement of the Unexpected, by Joe Musser and Josh McDowell, Here's Life Publishers, San Bernardino, California, 1981. Also released under the title A Skeptic's Quest.

== See also ==
- Biblical archaeology
- Christian countercult movement
- Christological argument
- Lewis's trilemma
- The Bible and history
- The Gospel of Afranius
