= Know Why You Believe =

Book of Christian apologetics by Paul E. Little

- Author: Paul E. Little
- Subject: Christian apologetics
- Publisher: Scripture Press Publications; InterVarsity Press
- Publication date: 1967

Know Why You Believe is a book of Christian apologetics written by Paul E. Little. It was first published by Scripture Press Publications in 1967, and then by InterVarsity Press in 1968. It was selected by Christianity Today magazine as one of the 50 most influential books among evangelicals over the last fifty years. J. P. Moreland notes that the book sparked his "lifelong interest in Christian apologetics" after he was given a copy shortly after his conversion.

Know Why You Believe is written from the perspective of evidential apologetics, and Little expands Lewis's trilemma into four possibilities: Jesus was either a liar, lunatic, legend, or Lord. Writing from a presuppositional point of view, Richard L. Pratt Jr. argues that "Little encourages the Christian apologist to present Christianity as a view to be examined and judged by independent human reason," and that he "treats rationality and logical analysis as something neutral for both Christians and non-Christians." In regards to Little's use of Lewis's trilemma, Pratt writes that "Little's arguments are sound from a Christian perspective, but they hold little or no weight for non-Christians."
