= Biblical infallibility =

Christian theology of the Bible

Biblical infallibility is the belief that the Bible can be relied on entirely for guidance in faith and Christian living, providing accurate and trustworthy direction for salvation and spiritual practice.

Historically, Jewish and Christian interpreters have treated the Bible as trustworthy, though trust did not necessarily imply historical or scientific accuracy. The concept of biblical infallibility gained prominence in 19th- and early 20th-century Protestantism as a fundamentalist reaction against modernist trends in mainstream Christianity. In parallel, the Catholic Church developed the idea of papal infallibility, while evangelical churches emphasized the infallibility of Scripture. Both movements combined theological claims with ideological resistance to perceived erosion of traditional authority, reflecting a broader crisis in Western religious authority.

Early Christian writers, such as Clement of Rome, emphasized the truthfulness of Scripture, attributing its teachings to divine inspiration and highlighting the moral endurance of the righteous. Denominational perspectives vary: the Catholic Church teaches the inerrancy of Scripture in matters of salvation but requires careful interpretation of the human authors’ intentions. Methodists, following John Wesley, regard Scripture as infallibly true and authoritative for faith and practice, though not equating the Bible itself with God. Evangelical views, particularly in the U.S., often uphold both inerrancy and infallibility, while many international evangelicals focus only on God’s infallibility rather than that of the Bible.

The concepts of infallibility and inerrancy are related but distinct. Infallibility refers to the Bible’s inability to fail in matters of faith and practice, while inerrancy denotes freedom from all errors, including historical or scientific details. Some denominations allow for minor errors in non-essential historical or scientific details under infallibility, whereas inerrancy traditionally holds that all original manuscript content is fully true. This distinction has led to ongoing debates among scholars and denominations, with documents like the Chicago Statement on Biblical Inerrancy affirming that infallibility and inerrancy are closely connected but not identical, and that scientific interpretations should not override scriptural teachings on creation and divine events.

== Background ==
Historically, Jewish and Christian interpreters of the Bible have seen it as reliable and trustworthy, but such views do not equate veracity with historicity, scientificity or even facticity. The idea of biblical infallibility gained ground in Protestant churches as a fundamentalist reaction against a general movement towards modernism within mainstream Christian denominations in the 19th and early 20th centuries.

In the Catholic church, the reaction produced the concept of papal infallibility whereas, in the evangelical churches, the infallibility of the Bible was asserted. "Both movements represent a synthesis of a theological position and an ideological-political stance against the erosion of traditional authorities. Both are antimoderne and literalist."

No matter how little common ground was apparent at the time between Roman Catholicism and the Evangelical Right, these two reformulations of scriptural and papal supremacy represented a defiant assertiveness in reaction against the crisis of religious authority that was engulfing Western religion.

== Patristic ==
Clement of Rome in his Letter to the Corinthians says:

1Clem 45:1-5:
You are contentious, brethren, and zealous for the things which lead to salvation. You have studied the Holy Scriptures, which are true, and given by the Holy Spirit. You know that nothing unjust or counterfeit is written in them. You will not find that the righteous have been cast out by holy men. The righteous were persecuted, but it was by the wicked. They were put in prison; but it was by the unholy. They were stoned by law-breakers, they were killed by men who had conceived foul and unrighteous envy. These things they suffered, and gained glory by their endurance.

== Denominational positions ==
=== Catholicism ===
The Catholic Church does not claim infallibility of scripture, instead asserting freedom from error, holding "the doctrine of the inerrancy of Scripture". The Second Vatican Council, citing earlier declarations, stated: "Since everything asserted by the inspired authors or sacred writers must be held to be asserted by the Holy Spirit, it follows that the books of Scripture must be acknowledged as teaching solidly, faithfully and without error that truth which God wanted put into sacred writings for the sake of salvation." It added: "Since God speaks in Sacred Scripture through men in human fashion, the interpreter of Sacred Scripture, in order to see clearly what God wanted to communicate to us, should carefully investigate what meaning the sacred writers really intended, and what God wanted to manifest by means of their words."

=== Methodism ===
The Methodist theologian Thomas A. Lambrecht notes that John Wesley, the founder of Methodism,

...used the word "infallible" to describe the Scriptures. In his sermon on "The Means of Grace," Wesley says, "The same truth (namely, that this is the great means God has ordained for conveying his manifold grace to man) is delivered, in the fullest manner that can be conceived, in the words which immediately follow: 'All Scripture is given by inspiration of God;' consequently, all Scripture is infallibly true; 'and is profitable for doctrine, for reproof, for correction, for instruction in righteousness;' to the end 'that the man of God may be perfect, thoroughly furnished unto all good works' (2 Tim. 3:16, 17)" (emphasis added).

As such, Lambrecht notes that "orthodox, evangelical, and traditionalist United Methodists believe in the 'infallibility' of Scripture." "Article V—Of the Sufficiency of the Holy Scriptures for Salvation" in the Articles of Religion states that:

The Holy Scripture containeth all things necessary to salvation; so that whatsoever is not read therein, nor may be proved thereby, is not to be required of any man that it should be believed as an article of faith, or be thought requisite or necessary to salvation. In the name of the Holy Scripture we do understand those canonical books of the Old and New Testament of whose authority was never any doubt in the Church.

Lambrecht, therefore, writes that:

The Bible is not God, and those who believe in its infallibility do not worship the Bible. But the Bible is God's most objective and detailed way of communicating with us, God's people. Its infallibility means we can trust the Bible to truly communicate to us what God wants us to believe and how God wants us to live. To ignore or disobey the teachings of Scripture is to contradict its infallibility, which puts us on a completely different theological path altogether.

=== Evangelicalism ===
While the doctrines of inerrancy and infallibility are cornerstone doctrines for many quarters of the US Evangelicalism, it is not so for many Evangelicals around the world, for whom God only is inerrant and infallible.

For many British evangelicals, inerrancy was American in origin, exotic in its implications, and was associated with various obscurantist attitudes and beliefs for which British evangelicals had no enthusiasm.

== Neighboring concepts ==
=== Infallibility and inerrancy ===
Some theologians and denominations equate "inerrancy" and "infallibility"; others do not. For example, Davis suggests: "The Bible is inerrant if and only if it makes no false or misleading statements on any topic whatsoever. The Bible is infallible if and only if it makes no false or misleading statements on any matter of faith and practice." In this sense it is seen as distinct from biblical inerrancy.

There is a widespread confusion among Evangelical and Christian fundamentalist circles that biblical infallibility means that the Bible cannot contain errors while inerrancy implies that the Bible contains no errors. However, the concept of infallibility has no relation to errors, but the impossibility of failure.

The confusion between the terms is consistent. Old Testament scholar John Walton uses the term inerrancy in the sense that the "Scripture is not to be understood as making scientific affirmations, particularly in the realms of cosmology, anatomy, and physiology"; however, this definition actually refers to infallibility rather than inerrancy. Using non-theological dictionary definitions, Frame (2002) insists that infallibility is a stronger term than inerrancy. "'Inerrant' means there are no errors; 'infallible' means there can be no errors." Yet he agrees that "modern theologians insist on redefining that word also, so that it actually says less than 'inerrancy.'"

Some denominations that teach infallibility hold that the historical or scientific details, which may be irrelevant to matters of faith and Christian practice, may contain errors. This contrasts with the doctrine of biblical inerrancy, which holds that the scientific, geographic, and historic details of the scriptural texts in their original manuscripts are completely true and without error, though the scientific claims of scripture must be interpreted in the light of the phenomenological nature of the biblical narratives. The Chicago Statement on Biblical Inerrancy uses the term in this sense, saying, "Infallibility and inerrancy may be distinguished but not separated." And "We deny that Biblical infallibility and inerrancy are limited to spiritual, religious, or Redemptive themes, exclusive of assertions in the fields of history and science. We further deny that scientific hypotheses about earth history may properly be used to overturn the teaching of Scripture on Creation and the Flood."

== See also ==
- Biblical literalism
- Christian fundamentalism
- Mammotrectus super Bibliam
