= Paul Little =

Paul Little may refer to:

- Paul Little (author) (1915–1987), American pulp fiction writer
- Paul E. Little (1928–1975), American evangelist
- Paul Little (basketball) (born 1960s), American basketball player
- Paul Little (businessman) (born 1947), Australian businessman and philanthropist
- Paul Little (rugby union) (1934–1993), New Zealand rugby union player
- Max Hardcore (Paul F. Little, 1956–2023), American pornographic actor
