= Arthur F. Holmes =

American philosopher

- Born: Arthur Frank Holmes; March 15, 1924; Dover, England
- Died: October 8, 2011 (aged 87); Wheaton, Illinois, U.S.
- Education: Wheaton College (AB, MA); Northwestern University (PhD)
- Occupation: Philosophy professor
- Spouse: Alice
- Children: Paul Holmes, Mark Holmes
- Awards: Wheaton College Teacher of the Year 1966, 1983; Illinois Professor of the Year 1987; Mark Hatfield Award (from the Coalition for Christian Colleges and Universities) 1998; two (2) honorary doctoral degrees.

Arthur Frank Holmes (March 15, 1924 – October 8, 2011) was an English philosopher who served as Professor of Philosophy at Wheaton College in Illinois, U.S., from 1951 to 1994. He built the philosophy department at Wheaton where he taught, wrote about the philosophy of Christian education, and participated in the creation of the Society of Christian Philosophers. Wheaton College President Philip Ryken said "It would be hard to think of anyone who has had a greater impact on Christian higher education than Arthur Holmes." Holmes died in Wheaton, Illinois, on October 8, 2011, at age 87.

== Education and career at Wheaton College ==
A native of Dover, England, Holmes came to the United States in 1947 after serving in the Royal Air Force during World War II. He earned a bachelor's degree (1950) and a master's degree (1952) in Bible and theology from Wheaton College and a Ph.D. in philosophy from Northwestern University in Chicago (1957).

Holmes began teaching at his alma mater while still pursuing his graduate degrees and remained there for his entire 43-year career. He was involved in convincing the college to establish a philosophy department independent of the Bible and theology division, and he served as the chair of that department for more than two decades. He started the annual Wheaton Philosophy Conference in 1954, which eventually led to the creation of the Society of Christian Philosophers in 1978. He taught the year-long history of philosophy course for the philosophy major (made available online in 2015). Holmes retired in 1994 and was named Professor Emeritus; he continued to teach occasionally.

== Honors and awards ==
- Wheaton College Teacher of the Year, 1966
- Wheaton College Alumnus of the Year for Distinguished Service to Alma Mater, 1978
- Wheaton College Teacher of the Year, 1983
- Illinois Professor of the Year, 1987 (Council for Advancement and Support of Education)
- Professor of the Year with highest honors, 1994 (All-Professor Team, The Chicago Tribune)
- Mark O. Hatfield Leadership Award, 1998 (Coalition for Christian Colleges and Universities)

In 1998, the Arthur F. Holmes Chair of Faith and Learning was established at Wheaton College, supporting the work of scholars in philosophy, history, or English who gave particular attention to the integration of faith and learning, which had been of particular interest to Holmes.

Holmes also served as a guest lecturer at many colleges, universities, and conferences. He received two honorary doctoral degrees.

== Notable students ==
Holmes' had the "grand vision" for the Wheaton College philosophy department that it would produce 100 graduates who would go on to earn Ph.D.s in philosophy. Several years after Holmes' death, former student Clifford Williams investigated whether that ambition had been achieved; he identified at least 116 of Holmes' former students who had earned doctorates in philosophy. Many of Holmes' former students also pursued advanced study in other fields, such as history, literature, and Biblical studies. Among his notable students are:

- William Lane Craig, Biola University
- C. Stephen Evans, Baylor University
- Jorge J. E. Gracia, SUNY Buffalo
- Douglas Jacobsen, Messiah University
- Mark A. Noll, University of Notre Dame
- Philip Graham Ryken, eighth and current president of Wheaton College
- Jon M. Sweeney, author and publisher
- Marianne Meye Thompson, Fuller Seminary
- Clifford Williams, Wheaton College

== Published writings ==
Holmes wrote or edited 14 books and many articles on topics related to philosophy, including ethics, philosophy applied to Christian higher education, and historical interactions between Christianity and philosophy. His publications include:

- Christianity and Philosophy (Inter-Varsity Press, 1963) OCLC 220537127; republished as Philosophy: A Christian Perspective (Inter-Varsity Press, 1978) ISBN 0877844240
- Christian Philosophy in the Twentieth Century: An Essay in Philosophical Methodology (Craig Press, 1969) OCLC 120465
- Faith Seeks Understanding: A Christian Approach to Knowledge (Eerdmans, 1971) OCLC 952866952
- The Idea of a Christian College (Eerdmans, first edition 1975; revised edition 1987) ISBN 0802815928; ISBN 0802802583
- All Truth is God's Truth (Eerdmans, 1977) ISBN 0-8028-1701-7
- Contours of a World View (Eerdmans, 1983) ISBN 0802819575
- Ethics: Approaching Moral Decisions (InterVarsity Press, first edition 1989; second edition 2007) ISBN 0877843422; ISBN 0830828036
- Shaping Character: Moral Education in the Christian College (Eerdmans, 1990) ISBN 0802804977
- Fact, Value, and God (Eerdmans, 1997) ISBN 0-8028-4312-3
- Building the Christian Academy (Eerdmans, 2001) ISBN 0-8028-4744-7

As Editor:

- War and Christian Ethics: Classic and Contemporary Readings on the Morality of War (Baker, first edition 1975; second edition 2005) ISBN 0801041384; ISBN 0801031133
- The Making of a Christian Mind : A Christian World View & the Academic Enterprise (InterVarsity, 1985) ISBN 0877845255

== See also ==
- American philosophy
- List of American philosophers
