= Rational fideism =

Philosophical view on faith and reason

Rational fideism is the philosophical view that considers faith to be precursor for any reliable knowledge. Every paradigmatic system, whether one considers rationalism or empiricism, is based on axioms that are neither self-grounding nor self-evident (see the Münchhausen trilemma), so it appeals to assumptions accepted as belief (in reason or experience respectively). Thus, faith is basic to knowability. On the other hand, such a conclusion is reached not with an act of faith but with reasoning, a rational argumentation.

== Definitions ==
"Rational fideism" has been defined variously. The following are some definitions.

For Joseph Glanvill rational fideism is the view that "Faith, and faith alone, is the basis for our belief in our reason. We believe in our reason because we believe in God's veracity. We do not try to prove that God is truthful; we believe this. Thus, faith in God gives us faith in reason, which in turn "justifies" our belief that God is no deceiver."

Richard Popkin sees rational fideism as the opposite of "pure, blind, fideism".

Similarly, Domenic Marbaniang sees rational fideism as "the view that the knowledge of God can be certified through faith alone that is based on a revelation that is rationally verified." Observing that the way of both rationalism and empiricism towards the knowledge of ultimate or transcendent reality is bleak, he thinks that while fideism is the view that truth in religion rests solely on faith and not on a reasoning process, rational fideism "holds that truth in religion rests solely on faith; not blind faith, but faith that can give rational and cogent answers or reason to warrant the belief."

According to C. Stephen Evans, rational fideism involves the possibility of reason becoming self-critical. Seeing it as the kind of responsible fideism, he states, "If human reason has limitations and also has some ability to recognise those limitations, then the possibility of responsible fideism emerges." Evans states that not only does reason have limitations, it is also tainted by sin making one entitled to faith where reason fails.

Patrick J. Clarke defines rational fideism as the approach that sees "reason as capable of providing the intellectual foundation of faith, not a priori but a posteriori, much as philosophy provides an intellectual foundation to theology."

== Arguments for rational fideism ==
Brendan Sweetman notes a type of rational fideism as a view developed by some thinkers who hold that the pragmatic spiritual and moral success of believing in God on faith alone could be used as an "indirect argument for the truth of fideism."

== Arguments against rational fideism ==
R.C. Sproul, John Gerstner, and Arthur Lindsley argue that "Rational fideism is a contradiction in terms" since requiring a criterion for belief is non-fideistic as fideism begins with belief; that is, fideistic belief proceeds from faith rather than reaching faith as a result of rational query.

== See also ==
- Metaphysics § Science
- Fideism
- Religious epistemology
- Philosophical theology
- Philosophy of religion
