= Christian apologetics =

Christian theology that defends Christianity against objections

Christian apologetics (Ancient Greek: ἀπολογία, "verbal defense, speech in defense") is a branch of Christian theology that defends Christianity. It is potentially first seen in 1 Peter 3:15–16, in which Christians should respond in a well manner to those who ask about their faith.

Christian apologetics have taken many forms over the centuries, starting with Paul the Apostle in the early church and Patristic writers such as Origen, Augustine of Hippo, Justin Martyr and Tertullian, then continuing with writers such as Thomas Aquinas, Duns Scotus, William of Ockham and Anselm of Canterbury during Scholasticism.

Blaise Pascal was an active Christian apologist during the 17th century. In the modern period, Christianity was defended through the efforts of many authors such as John Henry Newman, G. K. Chesterton, William Lane Craig and C. S. Lewis, as well as G. E. M. Anscombe.

== History ==
=== Jewish precursors ===
According to Edgar J. Goodspeed, Jewish apologetic elements could be seen in first century CE works such as The Wisdom of Solomon, Philo's On the Contemplative Life and, more explicitly, Josephus's Against Apion.

=== Apostolic and post-apostolic period ===
Christian apologetics first appear in the New Testament (e. g. Paul's preaching on Mars Hill in Acts 17:22–31). During the subapostolic age Christianity was already competing with Judaism as well as with various other religions and sects in the Greco-Roman world. Christian apologetics can be first seen in the ''Preaching of Peter'' (Gospel of Peter), but the first explicitly apologetic work comes from Quadratus of Athens (c. 125 CE) in which he writes a defense of the faith to emperor Hadrian. Only a fragment, quoted by Eusebius, has survived to our day:

But the works of our Saviour were always present, for they were genuine:—those that were healed, and those that were raised from the dead, who were seen not only when they were healed and when they were raised, but were also always present; and not merely while the Saviour was on earth, but also after his death, they were alive for quite a while, so that some of them lived even to our day. (Church History iv. 3. 2)

One of the first comprehensive attacks on Christianity came from the Greek philosopher Celsus, who wrote The True Word (c. 175 CE), a polemic criticizing Christians as being unprofitable members of society. In response, the church father Origen published his apologetic treatise Contra Celsum, or Against Celsus, which systematically addressed Celsus's criticisms and helped bring Christianity a level of academic respectability. In the treatise, Origen writes from the perspective of a Platonic philosopher, drawing extensively on the teachings of Plato. Contra Celsum is widely regarded by modern scholars as one of the most important works of early Christian apologetics.

Other apologists from this period are Aristides of Athens, the author of the Epistle to Diognetus, Aristo of Pella, Tatian, Justin Martyr, Melito of Sardis, Athenagoras of Athens, Theophilus of Antioch, Irenaeus, Origen, Hippolytus of Rome, Tertullian, Minucius Felix, Cyprian, and Victorinus of Pettau.

=== Middle Ages and Early Modern Period ===
Anselm of Canterbury propounded the ontological argument in his Proslogion. Thomas Aquinas presented five ways, or arguments for God's existence, in the Summa Theologica, while his Summa contra Gentiles was a major apologetic work. Aquinas also made significant criticisms of the ontological argument which resulted in its losing popularity until it was revived by René Descartes in his Meditations. Blaise Pascal outlined an approach to apologetics in his Pensées: "Men despise religion; they hate it and fear it is true. To remedy this, we must begin by showing that religion is not contrary to reason; that it is venerable, to inspire respect for it; then we must make it lovable, to make good men hope it is true; finally, we must prove it is true."

=== Late Modern Period ===
Christian apologetics continues in modern times in a wide variety of forms. Among Catholics there are Bishop Robert Barron, G. K. Chesterton, Ronald Knox, Taylor Marshall, Arnold Lunn, Karl Keating, Michael Voris, Peter Kreeft, Frank Sheed, Scott Hahn, and Patrick Madrid. The Russian Orthodox Seraphim Rose is perhaps the best known modern, English speaking Eastern Orthodox apologist. Among the Evangelicals there is the Anglican C. S. Lewis (who popularized the argument now known as Lewis's trilemma). Among Protestant apologists of the 19th century there was William Paley who popularized the Watchmaker analogy. In the first half of the 20th century, many Christian fundamentalists became well known apologists. Some of the best known are R. A. Torrey and John Gresham Machen. Evangelical Norman Geisler, Lutheran John Warwick Montgomery and Presbyterian Francis Schaeffer were among the most prolific Christian apologists in the latter half of the 20th century and into the 21st, while Gordon Clark and Cornelius Van Til started a new school of philosophical apologetics called presuppositionalism, which is popular in Calvinist circles.

Others include William Lane Craig, Douglas Groothuis, Josh McDowell, Hugo Anthony Meynell, Timothy J. Keller, Francis Collins, Vishal Mangalwadi, Richard Bauckham, Craig Evans, Darrell Bock, Frank Turek, John F. MacArthur, R. C. Sproul, Michael R. Licona, Ravi Zacharias, Alister McGrath and John Lennox.

== Terminology and origin ==
The original Greek apologia (ἀπολογία, from Ancient Greek: ἀπολογέομαι, romanized: apologeomai, lit. 'speak in return, defend oneself') was a formal verbal defense, either in response to accusation or prosecution in a court of law. The defense of Socrates as presented by Plato and Xenophon was an apologia against charges of "corrupting the young, and ... not believing in the gods in whom the city believes, but in other daimonia that are novel".

In later use 'apologia' sometimes took a literary form in early Christian discourse as an example of the integration of educated Christians into the cultural life of the Roman Empire, particularly during the "little peace" of the 3rd century, and of their participation in the Greek intellectual movement broadly known as the Second Sophistic. The Christian apologists of the early Church did not reject Greek philosophy, but attempted to show the positive value of Christianity in dynamic relation to the Greek rationalist tradition.

In the 2nd century, apologetics was a defense or explanation of Christianity, addressed to those standing in opposition and those yet to form an opinion, such as emperors and other authority figures, or potential converts. The earliest martyr narrative has the spokesman for the persecuted present a defense in the apologetic mode: Christianity was a rational religion that worshiped only God, and although Christians were law-abiding citizens willing to honor the emperor, their belief in a single divinity prevented them from taking the loyalty oaths that acknowledged the emperor's divinity.

The apologetic historiography in the Acts of the Apostles presented Christianity as a religious movement at home within the Roman Empire and no threat to it and was a model for the first major historian of the Church, Eusebius. Apologetics might also be directed to Christians already within the community explain their beliefs and justify positions. Origen's apologetic Contra Celsum, for instance, provided a defense against the arguments of a critic dead for decades to provide answers to doubting Christians lacking immediate answers to the questions raised. Apologetic literature was an important medium for the formation of early Christian identity.

In addition to Origen and Tertullian, early Christian apologists include Justin Martyr, Clement of Alexandria, and the author of the Epistle to Diognetus. Augustine of Hippo was a significant apologist of the Patristic era. Some scholars regard apologetics as a distinct literary genre exhibiting commonalities of style and form, content, and strategies of argumentation. Others viewed it as a form of discourse characterized by its tone and purpose.

=== Biblical basis ===
R. C. Sproul, quoting the First Epistle of Peter, writes that "The defense of the faith is not a luxury or intellectual vanity. It is a task appointed by God that you should be able to give a reason for the hope that is in you as you bear witness before the world." The verse quoted here reads in full: "but in your hearts honor Christ the Lord as holy, always being prepared to make a defense to anyone who asks you for a reason for the hope that is in you; yet do it with gentleness and respect."

Another passage sometimes used as a biblical basis for Christian apologetics is God's entreaty in the Book of Isaiah: "Come now, let us reason together." Other scriptural passages which have been taken as a basis for Christian apologetics include Psalm 19, which begins "The heavens declare the glory of God; the skies proclaim the work of his hands," and Romans 1, which reads "For since the creation of the world God's invisible qualities—his eternal power and divine nature—have been clearly seen, being understood from what has been made, so that men are without excuse."

== Varieties ==
There are a variety of Christian apologetic styles and schools of thought. The major types of Christian apologetics include historical and legal evidentialist apologetics, presuppositional apologetics, philosophical apologetics, prophetic apologetics, doctrinal apologetics, biblical apologetics, moral apologetics, and scientific apologetics.

=== Biblical apologetics ===
Biblical apologetics include issues concerned with the authorship and date of biblical books, biblical canon, and biblical inerrancy. Christian apologists defend and comment on various books of the Bible. Some scholars who have engaged in the defense of biblical inerrancy include Robert Dick Wilson, Gleason Archer, Norman Geisler and R. C. Sproul. Evangelical apologists have also produced works addressing alleged contradictions and difficulties in specific biblical passages. Authors defending the reliability of the Gospels include Craig Blomberg in The Historical Reliability of the Gospels, Mark D. Roberts in Can We Trust the Gospels? Richard Bauckham, Craig Evans and Darrell Bock.

=== Experiential apologetics ===
Experiential apologetics is a reference to an appeal "primarily, if not exclusively, to experience as evidence for Christian faith." Also, "they spurn rational arguments or factual evidence in favor of what they believe to be a self-verifying experience." This view stresses experience that other apologists have not made as explicit, and in the end, the concept that the Holy Spirit convinces the heart of truth becomes the central theme of the apologetic argument.

=== Historical and legal evidentialism ===
A variety of arguments has been forwarded by legal scholars such as Simon Greenleaf and John Warwick Montgomery, by expert forensic investigators such as cold case homicide detective J. Warner Wallace, and academic historical scholars, such as Edwin M. Yamauchi. These arguments present a case for the historicity of the resurrection of Christ per current legal standards of evidence or undermining the pagan myth hypothesis for the origin of Christianity.

=== Moral apologetics ===
Moral apologetics states that real moral obligation is a fact. Catholic apologist Peter Kreeft said, "We are really, truly, objectively obligated to do good and avoid evil." In moral apologetics, the arguments for man's sinfulness and man's need for redemption are stressed. Examples of this type of apologetic would be Jonathan Edwards' sermon "Sinners in the Hands of an Angry God." The Four Spiritual Laws religious tract (Campus Crusade for Christ) would be another example.

=== Defense of miracles ===
C. S. Lewis, Norman Geisler, William Lane Craig and Christians who engage in jurisprudence Christian apologetics have argued that miracles are reasonable and plausible wherever an all-powerful Creator is postulated. In other words, it is postulated that if God exists, miracles cannot be postulated as impossible or inherently improbable.

=== Philosophical apologetics ===
Philosophical apologetics concerns itself primarily with arguments for the existence of God, although they do not exclusively focus on this area. They do not argue for the veracity of Christianity over other religions but merely for the existence of a Creator deity. Omnipotence and omniscience are implied in these arguments to greater or lesser degrees: some argue for an interventionist god, some are equally relevant to a Deist conception of God.

They do not support hard polytheism, but could be used to describe the first god who created many other gods; however, the arguments are only relevant when applied to the first god (the first cause, pure act and unmoved mover; it is a contradiction a priori to suppose a plurality of "pure acts" or "first causes" or "unmoved movers").

These arguments can be grouped into several categories:

1. Cosmological argument – Argues that the existence of the universe demonstrates that God exists. Various primary arguments from cosmology and the nature of causation are often offered to support the cosmological argument.
2. Teleological argument – Argues that there is a purposeful design in the world around us, and a design requires a designer. Cicero, William Paley, and Michael Behe use this argument as well as others.
3. Ontological argument – Argues that the very concept of God demands that there is an actual existent God.
4. Moral Argument – Argues that there are objectively valid moral values, and therefore, there must be an absolute from which they are derived.
5. Transcendental Argument – Argues that all our abilities to think and reason require the existence of God.
6. Presuppositional arguments – Argues that the basic beliefs of theists and nontheists require God as a necessary pre-condition.

Other philosophical arguments include:

- Alvin Plantinga's argument that belief in God is properly basic, reformed epistemology.
- Pascal's wager, is an argument that posits that humans all bet with their lives either that God exists or that he does not. Pascal argues that a rational person should live as though God exists.

In addition to arguments for the existence of God, Christian apologists have also attempted to respond successfully to arguments against the existence of God. Two very popular arguments against the existence of God are the hiddenness argument and the argument from evil. The hiddenness argument tries to show that a perfectly loving God's existence is incompatible with the existence of nonresistant nonbelievers. The argument from evil tries to show that the existence of evil renders God's existence unlikely or impossible.

==== Presuppositional apologetics ====
Presuppositional apologetics is a Reformed Protestant methodology which claims that presuppositions are essential to any philosophical position and that there are no "neutral" assumptions from which a Christian can reason in common with a non-Christian. There are two main schools of presuppositional apologetics, that of Cornelius Van Til (and his students Greg Bahnsen and John Frame) and that of Gordon Haddon Clark.

Van Til drew upon but did not always agree with, the work of Dutch Calvinist philosophers and theologians such as D. H. Th. Vollenhoven, Herman Dooyeweerd, Hendrik G. Stoker, Herman Bavinck, and Abraham Kuyper. Bahnsen describes Van Til's approach to Christian apologetics as pointing out the difference in ultimate principles between Christians and non-Christians and then showing that the non-Christian principles reduce to absurdity. In practice, this school utilizes what has come to be known as the transcendental argument for the existence of God.

Clark held that the Scriptures constituted the axioms of Christian thought, which could not be questioned, though their consistency could be discussed. A consequence of this position is that God's existence can never be demonstrated, either by empirical means or by philosophical argument. In The Justification of Knowledge, the Calvinist theologian Robert L. Reymond argues that believers should not even attempt such proofs.

=== Prophetic fulfillment ===
In his book Science Speaks, Peter Stoner argues that only God knows the future and that Biblical prophecies of a compelling nature have been fulfilled. Apologist Josh McDowell documents the Old Testament prophecies fulfilled by Christ, relating to his ancestral line, birthplace, virgin birth, miracles, death, and resurrection. Apologist Blaise Pascal believed that the prophecies are the strongest evidence for Christianity. He notes that Jesus not only foretold, but was foretold, unlike in other religions, and that these prophecies came from a succession of people over a span of four thousand years.

=== Origins apologetics ===
Many Christians contend that science and the Bible do not contradict each other and that scientific fact supports Christian apologetics. The Catechism of the Catholic Church states that "The question about the origins of the world and of man has been the object of many scientific studies which have splendidly enriched our knowledge... These discoveries invite us to even greater admiration for the greatness of the Creator." The theologian and mathematician Marin Mersenne used celestial mechanics as evidence in his apologetic work, while Matteo Ricci engaged in scientific apologetics in China. In modern times, the theory of the Big Bang has been used in support of Christian apologetics.

Several Christian apologists have sought to reconcile Christianity and science concerning the question of origins. Theistic evolution claims that classical religious teachings about God are compatible with the modern scientific understanding about biological evolution and that the Creator God uses the process of evolution. Denis Lamoureux, in Evolutionary Creation: A Christian Approach to Evolution, states that "This view of origins fully embraces both the religious beliefs of biblical Christianity and the scientific theories of cosmological, geological, and biological evolution. It contends that the Creator established and maintains the laws of nature, including the mechanisms of a teleological evolution."

One of the most influential examples of a Christian-evolutionary synthesis is the work of Pierre Teilhard de Chardin, which was intended as apologetics to the world of science, but was later condemned by the Catholic Church.

==== Creationist apologetics ====
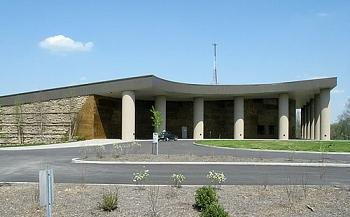
The Creation Museum is a young Earth creationism museum run by the creation apologetics organization Answers in Genesis (AiG) in Petersburg, Kentucky.

Creationist apologetics aims to defend views of origins such as Young Earth creationism and Old Earth creationism that run counter to mainstream science.

Young Earth creationists believe the Bible teaches that the Earth is approximately 6,000 years old, and reject the scientific consensus for the age of the Earth. They apply a literal interpretation to the primordial history in Genesis 1–11 – such as the long life spans of people such as Methuselah, the Flood, and the Tower of Babel. Among the biggest young Earth creation apologetic organizations are Answers in Genesis, Institute for Creation Research, and Creation Ministries International.

Old Earth creationists believe it is possible to harmonize the Bible's six-day account of creation with the scientific consensus that the universe is 13.8 billion years old and Earth is 4.54 billion years old. Old Earth creationists, such as astrophysicist Hugh Ross, see each of the six days of creation as being a long, but finite period of time, based on the multiple meanings of the Hebrew word yom (day light hours/24 hours/age of time) and other Biblical creation passages.

== Major colleges and universities offering Christian apologetics programs ==
School	Location	Program	Comments	Degrees awarded	Ref.
Biola University	La Mirada, California, US	Christian Apologistic		Certificate, M.A.	
Central India Theological Seminary	Itarsi, India	Christian Apologistic		M.Th., Ph.D.	
Colorado Christian University	Lakewood, Colorado, US	Applied Apologetics		Certificate, Bachelors, MA	
Denver Seminary	Littleton, Colorado, US	Apologetics and Ethics		M.A., M.Div. with Emphasis	
Hong Kong Centre for Christian Apologetics	Hong Kong	Christian Apologetics		Certificate in Christian Apologetics	
Houston Christian University	Houston, Texas, US	Christian Apologetics		M.A.A.	
Lancaster Bible College	Lancaster, Pennsylvania, US	Christian Apologetics		M.A.	
Morling College	Sydney, Australia	Christian Apologetics		M.Div	
New Orleans Baptist Theological Seminary	New Orleans, Louisiana, US	Christian Apologetics		M.A., M.Div., D.Min., Ph.D.	
Oklahoma Wesleyan University	Bartlesville, Oklahoma, US	Christian Apologetics		M.A.	
Westminster Theological Seminary	Philadelphia, Pennsylvania, US	Apologetics		Doctoral, Masters, Certificate Programs	
South African Theological Seminary	Johannesburg, South Africa	Apologetics		Th.M.	
Southern Baptist Theological Seminary	Louisville, Kentucky, US	Apologetics/Apologetics & Worldviews		M.A., Ph.D.	
Southern Evangelical Seminary	Charlotte, North Carolina, US	Apologetics/Scientific Apologetics		Certificate, MA, M.Div., D.Min.	
Global Life University/Ratio Christi Philippines	Pasig City, Philippines	Christian Apologetics		Certificate, M.A.	
Gimlekollen NLA College	Kristiansand, Norway	Communication, worldview and Christian apologetics		Certificate, Bachelor	
Liberty University	Lynchburg, Virginia, US	Christian Apologetics (M.A.), Bible Apologetics (B.S.)		B.S., M.A.	

== See also ==
- Apologetics – Religious discipline of systematic defence of a position
- Christian existential apologetics
- Christian philosophy – Philosophy carried out by Christians
- Christianity and Theosophy – Relation between Christianity and Theosophy
- Ecumenical apologetics
- Evidential apologetics – School of Christian apologetics
- Faith and rationality
- List of Christian apologetic works
- Religious epistemology – Approach to epistemological questions from a religious perspective
