= Douglas Jacobsen =

American religious studies scholar (born 1951)

Douglas G. Jacobsen
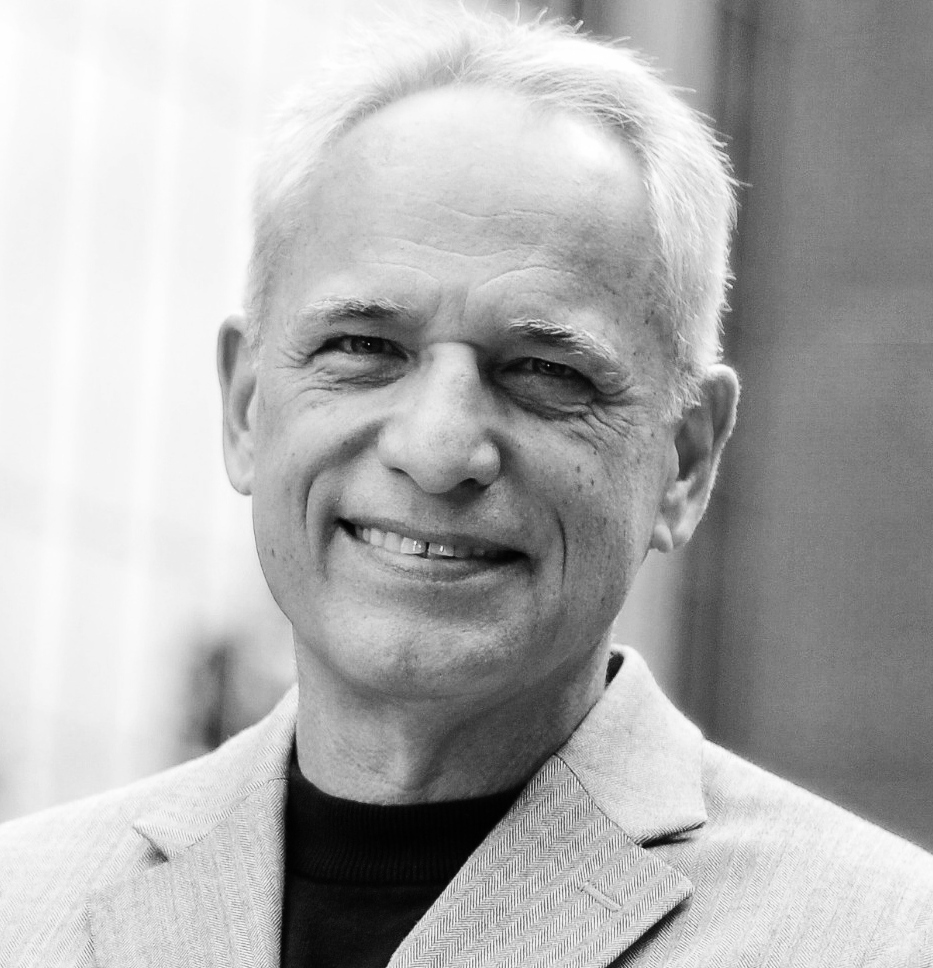
- Douglas Jacobsen in 2023
- Citizenship: USA
- Occupations: Professor, writer
- Spouse: Rhonda Hustedt Jacobsen

Douglas ("Jake") Jacobsen is a scholar in the field of religious studies whose work encompasses history, theology, and sociology. His early works are analyses of Pentecostalism and American Protestantism. He won the Pneuma Book Award from the Society for Pentecostal Studies in 2004. His current work focuses on world Christianity, including the books The World's Christians: Who They Are, Where They Are, and How They Got There and Global Gospel: An Introduction to Christianity on Five Continents.

Jacobsen also co-directs the Religion in the academy project with his wife Rhonda Hustedt Jacobsen, a scholar of higher education. This project has involved research at dozens of American colleges and universities and has resulted in three Oxford University Press books (2004, 2008, and 2012). Their book No Longer Invisible: Religion in University Education won a 2013 American Education Studies Association Critics' Choice Book Award. The American University in a Postsecular Age won the 2009 Lilly Fellows Book Award. Their work has also been featured in the popular press, including The Daily Beast and Inside Higher Ed.

Jacobsen was born in Brooklyn, New York, and raised in Teaneck, New Jersey. He attended Wheaton College (IL), where he studied with the philosopher Arthur F. Holmes and served as a teaching assistant for biblical scholar Gordon Fee. He then completed a master's degree and doctorate at the University of Chicago, where he studied with Martin E. Marty and Jerald C. Brauer. Jacobsen taught at Messiah University in Mechanicsburg, PA, from 1984 through 2019, and then retired as Distinguished Professor Emeritus of Church History and Theology. He previously taught at the University of Illinois, and he has been a visiting scholar at Pepperdine University.

Jacobsen, a member of the United Church of Christ, is an ecumenical theologian whose thinking has been influenced by Anabaptist, Catholic, Evangelical, Orthodox, and Pentecostal perspectives. During the 1990s, he co-directed the Re-Forming the Center Project (with William Vance Trollinger Jr.), which had the goal of identifying and trying to moderate the religious dynamics that were encouraging America's culture war. In 2006, he co-authored (with Rodney Sawatsky) a short introduction to theology entitled Gracious Christianity that emphasizes the role of love and gratitude in Christian life and thought. His most recent book is entitled What is Christianity?, which argues that Christianity can never be defined by any static set of beliefs but is instead a diverse, flexible, and still developing movement of people seeking to love God and serve their neighbors in an ever-changing, multicultural world.
