= The Only Possible Argument in Support of a Demonstration of the Existence of God =

1763 book by Immanuel Kant

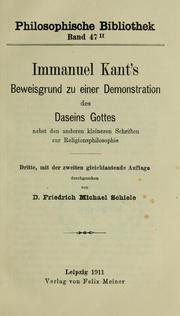
- German edition published in Leipzig in 1911
- Author: Immanuel Kant
- Original title: Der einzig mögliche Beweisgrund zu einer Demonstration des Daseins Gottes
- Language: German
- Subject: Religion
- Published: 1763
- Media type: Print

The Only Possible Argument in Support of a Demonstration of the Existence of God (German: Der einzig mögliche Beweisgrund zu einer Demonstration des Daseins Gottes) is a book by Immanuel Kant, published in 1763. It was published during the earlier period of Kant's philosophy, often referred to as the "pre-critical" period, during which he expressed little doubt about the possibility of rational metaphysics as conducted in the Leibnizian-Wolffian philosophical system which dominated German philosophy during that time. Kant later came to view this period of his philosophical career as a "dogmatic slumber".

== Contents ==
In The Only Possible Argument, Kant questions both the ontological argument for God (as proposed by Anselm of Canterbury) and the argument from design. Kant argues that the internal possibility of all things presupposes some existence:

Accordingly, there must be something whose nonexistence would cancel all internal possibility whatsoever. This is a necessary thing.

Kant then argues that this necessary thing must have all the characteristics commonly ascribed to God. Therefore, God necessarily exists. This a priori step in Kant's argument is followed by a step a posteriori, in which he establishes the necessity of an absolutely necessary being. He argues that matter itself contains the principles which give rise to an ordered universe, and this leads us to the concept of God as a Supreme Being, which "embraces within itself everything which can be thought by man." "God includes all that is possible or real." The Only Possible Argument anticipates his approach to divine being and the existence of God in the Critique of Pure Reason.

== Reception ==
"[T]he very substantial and favourable review published by Mendelssohn ... was responsible for establishing Kant's reputation in Germany as a major philosopher."

== See also ==
- Transcendental argument for God
- Ontological argument
