= Hong Kong Centre for Christian Apologetics =

Christian educational institution in Hong Kong

- Abbreviation: HKCCA
- Founded: 2017
- Type: Non-profit
- Purpose: Promote Christian apologetics
- Key people: Andrew Loke (Chairman), Kai-man Kwan, Chan Man Ho, Chai Kan Yan, Stephen Lam
- Website: christianapologeticshk.wordpress.com

Hong Kong Centre for Christian Apologetics (HKCCA) is a Christian educational institution founded in 2017 by a group of professors, lecturers and businessmen in Hong Kong. The centre offers certificate courses on Christian Apologetics and also promotes apologetic events hosting prominent apologists.

The committee includes professors such as Chan Man Ho of the Chinese University of Hong Kong, Chan Kai Yan of the Hong Kong Polytechnic University, Andrew Loke and Kai Man Kwan of Hong Kong Baptist University, and theologians, ministers and businessmen such as Domenic Marbaniang, Jonathan Johnson and KY Wong. The advisory has members such as Stephen Lam, formerly Chief Secretary of the Hong Kong Government in 2011-2012, and Christian apologist and founder of Reasonable Faith, William Lane Craig.
