= Ecumenical apologetics =

Ecumenical apologetics is "an explanation (defense) of the Christian Faith, in an ecumenical fashion"; presenting a defense of one's own faith while advocating and recognizing "a greater sense of shared spirituality" with those of other confessions or faith traditions.

While neither apologetics nor ecumenism is a new term, "ecumenical apologetics" came into use early in the 21st century in an effort to combine the two, which were previously presumed to be opposing efforts or ideas. Likewise, both apologetics and ecumenism are terms used by people of different religious orientations; however, the term is used primarily, if not exclusively, to refer to a form of Christian apologetics.
