= Presupposition (philosophy) =

In epistemology, a presupposition relates to a belief system, background framework, or Weltanschauung, that is required for the argument to make sense.

A variety of Christian apologetics, called presuppositional apologetics, argues that the existence or non-existence of God is the basic presupposition of all human thought, and that all people arrive at a worldview which is ultimately determined by the theology they presuppose. Evidence and arguments are only developed after the fact in an attempt to justify the theological assumptions already made. According to this view, it is impossible to demonstrate the existence of God unless one presupposes that God exists, with the stance that modern science relies on methodological naturalism, and thus is incapable of discovering the supernatural. It thereby fashions a Procrustean bed which rejects any observation which would disprove the naturalistic assumption. Apologetics argue that the resulting worldview is inconsistent with itself and therefore irrational (for example, via the Argument from morality or via the Transcendental argument for the existence of God).

== See also ==
- Russell's teapot
