= Transcendental argument for the existence of God =

Argument for the existence of God

The Transcendental Argument for the existence of God (TAG) is a transcendental argument that attempts to prove the existence of God. (Note: Note that "transcendental" in this case is used as an adjective specifying a specific kind of argument, and not a noun. Transcendental arguments should not be confused with arguments for the existence of something transcendent or conceptual.)

Several distinct arguments are supposed transcendental arguments for God:

1) A version was formulated by Immanuel Kant in his 1763 work The Only Possible Argument in Support of a Demonstration of the Existence of God and the Critique of Practical Reason. For Kant, morality is best explained by the existence of God.

2) C. S. Lewis's argument from reason is also a kind of transcendental argument.

3) The term is also used by Christian presuppositional apologetics and the likes of Cornelius Van Til and Greg Bahnsen, which attempt to appeal to God as the necessary condition for the possibility of experience and knowledge.

== Presuppositional apologetics ==
Presuppositional apologetics attempts to provide an alternative to thomistic and evidentialist arguments.

=== Criticism ===
Bálint Békefi has argued that TAG, as an ambitious transcendental argument, is susceptible to the Stroudian objection that how things must appear is not necessarily how things actually are. He also argues that the two strategies available to apologists for responding to Stroud are unsuccessful, and thus it is unlikely that TAG can overcome the Stroudian objection.

Internet Infidels co-founder Jeffery Jay Lowder has argued that the presuppositional apologetics' version of TAG is fatally flawed for numerous reasons. First, Bahnsen fails to defend the necessity of Christianity instead of the mere sufficiency for the rational justification of the laws of logic, the laws of science, and the laws of morality. In other words, such reasoning affirms the consequent. Second, Bahnsen conflates "atheism" with "materialism" and has really presented an argument against materialism, not an argument for Christianity. Third, Bahnsen believed that the laws of logic, laws of science, and laws of morality are abstract objects, but Christianity arguably underdetermines the relationship between God and abstract objects. Some Christian philosophers, such as Peter van Inwagen, affirm Platonism and the compatibility of God and abstract objects. But other Christian philosophers argue that Platonism is incompatible with divine aseity. William Lane Craig urges Christian philosophers to consider anti-realist theories of abstract objects.

=== Ash'ari ===
Medieval Ash'ari Islamic theologians formulated a type of transcendental argument based on the notion that morality, logic, etc. cannot be fully understood apart from revelation and thereby, belief in the Quran and the Islamic truth claims were necessary in order to interpret the external world. For al-Ashari and others, it does not make sense to argue against religion using a priori assumptions about morality or scientific probabilities when these can only be understood in light of divine revelation.

== See also ==
- Christian apologetics
