= Stephen T. Davis =

American scholar

Stephen T. Davis is an American scholar who has served as the Russell K. Pitzer Professor of Philosophy at Claremont McKenna College. His academic interests include philosophy of religion, Christian thought, metaphysics, and analytic theology. He has written several books, as well as academic articles and reviews. Davis received his M.Div. from Princeton Theological Seminary and his Ph.D from Claremont Graduate University. He also holds an honorary doctorate from Whitworth University.
