= Paul E. Little =

American evangelist (1928–1975

Paul Eagleson Little (30 December 1928 – 9 July 1975) was an American evangelist. He served as Director of Evangelism for InterVarsity Christian Fellowship from 1965 to 1975. He was also assistant professor of Evangelism at Trinity Evangelical Divinity School.

Little was born in Philadelphia and studied at Wharton School of Finance (BS, 1950) and Wheaton College (MA, 1958).

Little wrote a number of books, including How to Give Away Your Faith (1966), Know Why You Believe (1967), and Know What You Believe (1970). Know Why You Believe was selected by Christianity Today magazine as one of the 50 most influential books among evangelicals over the last fifty years.

Little died from an automobile accident in 1975.
