= Christological argument =

Argument for the existence of God

The Christological argument is the argument for the existence of God, which holds that if certain claims about Jesus are valid, then one should accept that God exists.

Notable proponents of this argument include Gary Habermas and William Lane Craig.

== Versions of the argument ==
=== Argument from the wisdom of Jesus ===
The essential structure of this argument is as follows:

1. The character and wisdom of Jesus is such that his views about reality are (or are likely to be) correct.
2. One of Jesus' views about reality was that God exists.
3. Therefore, the view that God exists is (or is likely to be) correct.

Some forms of evangelism take this approach. Potential converts are introduced to Jesus as a historical character and the merits of Jesus' teachings are discussed. In such a context, the historicity of Jesus is a crucial factor in assessing the argument.

The principal objections to (1) are the suggestions that:

1. The reports of Jesus' character in the Bible are not reliable.
2. Jesus' views about reality are not (or not likely to be) necessarily correct. Bertrand Russell, in his essay "Why I Am Not a Christian", criticized Jesus' personal character and philosophical positions on various grounds.
3. Even supposing that Jesus was correct, wise, and knowledgeable about a great many things does not imply that he was knowledgeable about everything. A deep knowledge of moral philosophy and the iniquities of the human condition, for example, do not necessarily imply any valid expertise on astrophysics, Phoenician literature, or the literal existence of God.

=== Argument from the claims of Jesus to divinity ===
Lewis's trilemma is an apologetic argument traditionally used to argue for the divinity of Jesus by arguing that the only alternatives were that he was evil or deluded. One version was popularised by University of Oxford literary scholar and writer C. S. Lewis in a BBC radio talk and in his writings. It is sometimes described as the "Lunatic, Liar, or Lord", or "Mad, Bad, or God" argument. It takes the form of a trilemma—a choice among three options, each of which is in some way difficult to accept.

This argument is very popular with Christian apologists, although some theologians and biblical scholars do not view Jesus as having claimed to be God. Some argue that he identified himself as a divine agent, with a unique relationship to Israel's God. Others see him as wanting to direct attention to the divine kingdom he proclaimed.

The argument relies on the premise that Jesus was a great moral teacher. The structure of the argument is as follows:

1. Jesus claimed to be God
2. Jesus was a wise moral teacher
3. By the trilemma, Jesus was dishonest, deluded or God
4. No wise moral teacher is dishonest
5. No wise moral teacher is deluded
6. By 2 and 4, Jesus was not dishonest
7. By 2 and 5, Jesus was not deluded
8. By 3, 6 and 7, Jesus was God
9. By 8, God exists

Those who dispute these premises suggest that:

1. Disputing premise 1: Jesus was indeed a wise moral teacher, but his reported teachings have been distorted or misrepresented. For instance, he may not have actually claimed to be divine; this claim may have been added by later writers. Many modern New Testament scholars argue that Jesus did not, in fact, claim to be God.
2. Disputing premise 2: C.S. Lewis expressed the opinion that any mere man who claimed to be God could not, by definition, be a wise moral teacher (and that, conversely, any wise moral teacher would not claim to be God). Christopher Hitchens argued that Jesus was not a wise moral teacher by arguing against several of his teachings. For example, of Jesus' teaching "Let him who is without sin cast the first stone", Hitchens wrote: "if only the non-sinners have the right to punish, then how could an imperfect society ever determine how to prosecute offenders?"
3. Disputing premise 4: A person can be a wise moral teacher despite lying. Jesus could have believed (as some later philosophers have held) that religion is false but beneficial to society, and that by establishing a new religion (or a reform of Judaism) he was doing a good deed nonetheless. And a wise moral teacher who is not God certainly suffers, as all men, from human weakness. Jesus could have been a wise moral teacher, and yet made an error of judgement (as the Bible itself records of Moses, David, and Elijah who it views as wise moral teachers who were rebuked by God or his prophets), even one as extreme as declaring himself to be a God. Or, someone can begin with wisdom and moral teachings and be corrupted by the experience of holding power to commit particular abuses, even though his teachings are wise and moral.
4. Disputing premise 5: A person can be a wise moral teacher despite being delusional. Granting credence to some, or even most, of someone's claims does not require that we give credence to all of them. Someone can believe Socrates' philosophical claims about justice without also believing Socrates' theological speculations about the Greek gods, or accept Aristotle's views on poetry without also accepting his claim that heavier objects fall faster than lighter ones.

Philosopher John Beversluis described Lewis's arguments as "textually careless and theologically unreliable", and this particular argument as logically unsound and an example of false dilemma. New Testament scholar N. T. Wright criticises Lewis for failing to recognise the significance of Jesus' Jewish identity and setting—an oversight which "at best, drastically short-circuits the argument" and which lays Lewis open to criticism that his argument "doesn't work as history, and it backfires dangerously when historical critics question his reading of the gospels", although he believes this "doesn't undermine the eventual claim".

=== Argument from the resurrection ===
Another argument is that the resurrection of Jesus occurred and was an act of God, hence God must exist. Some versions of this argument have been presented, such as N. T. Wright's argument from the nature of the claim of resurrection to its occurrence and the "minimal facts argument", defended by scholars such as Gary Habermas and Mike Licona, which defend that God raising Jesus from the dead is "the best explanation for a set of claimed historical facts about Jesus and his disciples".

William Lane Craig, another advocate of this last argument, includes in the list of facts:

1. After his crucifixion, Jesus was buried in a tomb by Joseph of Arimathea
2. On the Sunday following the crucifixion, Jesus’ tomb was found empty by a group of his women followers
3. On multiple occasions and under various circumstances, different individuals and groups of people experienced appearances of Jesus alive from the dead
4. The original disciples believed that Jesus was risen from the dead despite their having every predisposition to the contrary.

In light of these, he goes on to say the best explanation is that God raised Jesus from the dead.

Such arguments have had many responses which depends on the version in question. The "minimal facts argument", for instance, have been criticized both regarding the actual veracity of the claimed historical facts as well as the inference to the best explanation being that God rose Jesus from the dead. In the second case, people such as Gerd Lüdemann justify their rejection based on philosophical reasons while others, such as Bart D. Ehrman, do so by more methodological reasons. Regarding the claimed facts, Ehrman and others defend the idea that the sources used in their defense (normally the Gospels) are not trustworthy and so the facts cannot be credibly established.

This is the major position in Islam, which rejects the idea that Jesus ever was crucified. Islamic texts categorically deny the crucifixion and death of Jesus at the hands of the Jews. The Qur'an states that the Jews sought to kill Jesus, but they did not kill or crucify him, although a likeness of it was shown to them. Traditionalists believe that Jesus was not crucified but instead was raised alive into heaven. This raising is understood by them to mean bodily ascension, while some Qur'anic scholars, such as Muhammad Asad, while cross referencing the text consider it to mean being raised in honour:

and for boasting, "We killed the Messiah, Jesus, son of Mary, the messenger of Allah." But they neither killed nor crucified him—it was only made to appear so. Even those who argue for this ˹crucifixion˺ are in doubt. They have no knowledge whatsoever—only making assumptions. They certainly did not kill him. Rather, Allah raised him up to Himself. And Allah is Almighty, All-Wise.

— Surah An-Nisa 4:157-158

According to some Muslim traditions, Jesus was replaced by a double; others suggest it was Simon of Cyrene, or one of the disciples such as Judas Iscariot. Some others view it as Jesus surviving the crucifixion. A minority of commentaries of Ismaili or rationalist (falāsifa) leaning affirmed the crucifixion by arguing that Jesus' body had been crucified, but his spirit had ascended. However, this interpretation was generally rejected, and according to the Encyclopedia of Islam, there was unanimous agreement among the scholars in denying the crucifixion.

== See also ==
- Criticism of Jesus
- Mental health of Jesus
