= Religious epistemology =

Approach to epistemological questions from a religious perspective

Religious epistemology broadly covers religious approaches to epistemological questions, or attempts to understand the epistemological issues that come from religious belief. The questions asked by epistemologists apply to religious beliefs and propositions — whether they seem rational, justified, warranted, reasonable, based on evidence and so on. Religious views also influence general epistemological theories, such as in the case of Reformed epistemology.

Reformed epistemology has mainly developed in contemporary Christian religious epistemology from the late-20th century, as in the work of Alvin Plantinga (born 1932), William P. Alston (1921-2009), Nicholas Wolterstorff (born 1932) and Kelly James Clark, as a critique of and alternative to the idea of "evidentialism" of the sort proposed by W. K. Clifford (1845-1879). Alvin Plantinga, for instance, is critical of the evidentialist analysis of knowledge provided by Richard Feldman and by Earl Conee.

D. Z. Phillips (1934-2006) states that the argument of the reformed epistemologists furthers and challenges a view he dubs "foundationalism":

The essence of the Reformed challenge is to accuse the foundationalist of claiming to have a criterion of rationality which, in fact, he does not possess. By means of this alleged criterion the foundationalist claims to discern which epistemic practices are rational and which are not. Non-rational practices, he claims, include those of religion.

Much work in recent epistemology of religion goes beyond debates on foundationalism and reformed epistemology to consider contemporary issues deriving from social epistemology (especially concerning the epistemology of testimony, or the epistemology of disagreement), or formal epistemology's use of probability theory. Other notable work draws on the idea that knowing God is akin to knowing a person, which is not reducible to knowing propositions about a person (Eleonore Stump calls it "Franciscan knowledge," whereas Matthew Benton calls it "interpersonal knowledge").

Some work in recent epistemology of religion discusses various challenges from psychology, cognitive science or evolutionary biology to the rationality or justification of religious beliefs. Some argue that evolutionary explanations of religious belief undermine its rationality. Others respond to these arguments.

== See also ==
- Pramana – Epistemology, proof, reliable means of knowledge in Indian philosophies
- Faith and rationality
- Fideism – Epistemological theory that faith is independent of reason
- Pascal's wager – Argument for the belief in God
- Reformed epistemology – School of philosophical thought
- Skeptical theism – View regarding the problem of evil
- Street epistemology
