= Clifford Williams (philosopher) =

American philosopher (born 1943)

Clifford Williams (born 1943) is a retired American philosopher. He formerly served as professor of Philosophy at Wheaton College, Wheaton, Illinois. He is also Professor Emeritus of Philosophy at Trinity International University, Deerfield, Illinois. Williams graduated from Wheaton College in 1964 and from Indiana University with a Ph.D. in philosophy in 1972. He taught at St. John Fisher College in Rochester, New York from 1968 to 1982 with the exception of one semester at Houghton College. He then taught at Trinity International University from 1982 to 2012, becoming the chair of the philosophy department, with the exception of 1998–1999, where he taught at Wheaton College. He rejoined the faculty of Wheaton College in 2013. Williams is a historian of contemporary hobo culture and a part-time hobo, known in that subculture as "Oats."

== Bibliography ==
- Free Will and Determinism: A Dialogue. Indianapolis: Hackett Publishing Company (1980). ISBN 0-915144-78-6, ISBN 978-0-915144-78-5.
- Singleness of Heart: Restoring the Divided Soul. Grand Rapids: Eerdmans (1994). Vancouver: Regent College Publishing (2001): ISBN 1-57383-129-8, ISBN 978-1-57383-129-1.
- On Love and Friendship: Philosophical Readings, Editor. Sudbury: Jones and Bartlett Publishers (1995). ISBN 0-534-54267-0, ISBN 978-0-534-54267-2.
- With All That We Have, Why Aren't We Satisfied? Notre Dame: Sorin Books, 2001. ISBN 1-893732-23-1. Eugene, OR: Wipf & Stock Publishers, 2008. ISBN 978-1-55635-904-0
- The Life of the Mind: A Christian Perspective. Grand Rapids: Baker Book House (2002). ISBN 0-8010-2336-X, ISBN 978-0-8010-2336-1.
- Daybreakers: 365 Eye-Opening Reflections. Notre Dame: Sorin Books, 2002. ISBN 1-893732-52-5. Eugene, OR: Wipf & Stock Publishers, 2008. ISBN 978-1-55635-905-7.
- One More Train to Ride: The Underground World of Modern American Hoboes. Indianapolis: Indiana University Press (2003). ISBN 0-253-21652-4, ISBN 978-0-253-21652-6.
- Personal Virtues: Introductory Essays, Editor. Houndmills and New York: Palgrave Macmillan (2005). ISBN 1-4039-9455-2, ISBN 978-1-4039-9455-4.
- The Divided Soul: A Kierkegaardian Exploration. Eugene, OR: Wipf & Stock Publishers (2009). ISBN 978-1-60608-735-0
- The Wisdom of Kierkegaard: A Collection of Quotations on Faith and Life. Eugene, OR: Wipf and Stock Publishers (2009). ISBN 978-1-60608-485-4
- Existential Reasons for Belief in God: A Defense of Desires and Emotions for Faith. Downers Grove, IL: IVP Academic (2011). ISBN 978-0-8308-3899-8
- Choosing to Live: Stories of Those Who Stepped Away from Suicide. Springfield, IL: Charles C. Thomas Publisher (2017). ISBN 978-0-398-09171-2
- Religion and the Meaning of Life: An Existential Approach. Cambridge, UK: Cambridge University Press (2020). ISBN 978-1-108-43298-6
- The Uneasy Conscience of a White Christian: Making Racial Equity a Priority Eugene, OR: Wipf & Stock Publishers (2021). ISBN 978-1-6667-3078-4

== See also ==
- Free will
- Determinism
