= Presuppositional apologetics =

School of Christian apologetics

Presuppositional apologetics, shortened to presuppositionalism, is an epistemological school of Christian apologetics that examines the presuppositions at the basis of various worldviews, and invites comparison and contrast between the results of those presuppositions.

It claims that apart from presuppositions, one could not make sense of any human experience, and that there can be no set of neutral assumptions from which a Christian can reason with a non-Christian. Presuppositionalists claim that Christians cannot consistently declare their belief in the necessary existence of the God of the Bible and simultaneously argue on the basis of a different set of assumptions that God may not exist and Biblical revelation may not be true. Two schools of presuppositionalism exist, based on the different teachings of Cornelius Van Til (1895-1987) and of Gordon Haddon Clark (1902-1985). Presuppositionalism contrasts with classical apologetics and with evidential apologetics.

Presuppositionalists compare their presupposition against other ultimate standards such as reason, empirical experience, and subjective feeling, claiming presupposition in this context is:

a belief that takes precedence over another and therefore serves as a criterion for another. An ultimate presupposition is a belief over which no other takes precedence. For a Christian, the content of scripture must serve as his ultimate presupposition… This doctrine is merely the outworking of the 'lordship of the Christian God' in the area of human thought. It merely applies the doctrine of scriptural infallibility to the realm of knowing.

== Comparison with other schools of apologetics ==
Presuppositionalists contrast their approach with the other schools of Christian apologetics by describing the others as assuming that the world is intelligible apart from belief in the existence of God. Then they argue on purportedly neutral grounds to support trusting the Christian scriptures and the existence of God. Specifically, presuppositionalists describe Thomistic (also "traditional" or "classical") apologetics as concentrating on the first aspect of apologetics with its logical proofs for the existence of God. Thus assuming common ground with the non-Christian and using a piece-by-piece methodology. In this scheme, the common foundation of neutral brute facts leads to a generic concept of deity, then to the various characteristics of the Christian God as revealed in Scripture, and so forth. Piece-by-piece, Christian theology is built up from a neutral common ground.

Presuppositionalists assert that many of the classical arguments are logically fallacious, or do not prove enough, when used as arguments to prove the existence or character of God. (Note: However, Thomas Aquinas never speaks of "proofs" for the existence of God per se, and on one reading, his "ways" may be taken as demonstrations of the inner coherence of belief in God, rather than proofs. Taken in this sense, Van Til, Bahnsen, Frame, et al., have embraced the traditional arguments.) They criticize both the assumption of neutrality and the "block house" or "piecemeal" method for failing to start at the level of the controlling beliefs of worldviews and implicitly allowing non-Christian assumptions from the start, thereby trying to build a Christian "house" on a non-Christian "foundation". Evidentialists demur from this assessment, claiming that presuppositionalism amounts to fideism because it rejects the idea of shared points of reference between the Christian and non-Christian from which they may reason in common.

The conclusion of evidential apologetics is that the Bible's historical accounts and other truth-claims are more probably true than false, thus the whole of scriptural revelation may be rationally accepted, and where we can't approach absolute certainty we must accept the explanations most likely to be true. The goal of presuppositional apologetics, on the other hand, is to argue that the assumptions and actions of non-Christians require them to believe certain things about God, man, and the world which they claim not to believe. This type of argument is technically called a reductio ad absurdum in that it attempts to reduce the opposition to holding an absurd, i.e., self-contradictory position; in this case, both believing in facts of Christian revelation (in practice) and denying them (in word). So, in essence, evidential apologetics attempts to build upon a shared acceptance of self-evident or worldview-neutral facts, while presuppositional apologetics attempts to claim all facts for the Christian worldview as the only framework in which they are intelligible.

Another way presuppositionalism has been developed is by first presupposing reason as the laws of thought (common to all thinkers).This critically examines beliefs for meaning, and finally constructing a coherent worldview from the ground up. This way of arguing has been called Rational Presuppositionalism. They postulate that thinking (or reasoning) is presuppositional in that we think of the less basic things, like the nature of man, in light of the more basic things, the existence or non-existence of God. How we view mankind's purpose and destiny depends on our assumption about man's origin. Philosopher Surrendra Gangadean (1943–2022) opened his book Philosophical Foundation: A Critical Analysis of Basic Beliefs by stating the following. “Some things are clear. The basic things are clear. The basic things about God and man and good and evil are clear to reason.” He argues step by step from knowledge is possible to the existence of God to the Good for man as knowledge of the eternal Creator.

== History ==
The modern origins of presuppositional apologetics are in the work of Dutch theologian Cornelius Van Til, a member of the Orthodox Presbyterian Church, who began to adopt a presuppositional approach to defending his belief in the truth of his faith as early as the late 1920s. Van Til personally disliked the term "presuppositional", as he felt it misrepresented his approach to apologetics, which he felt was focused primarily on the preeminence of the Bible as the ultimate criterion for truth, rather than denying or ignoring evidence. He did, however, accept the label reluctantly, given that it was a useful way of distinguishing between those who deny a neutral basis for apologetics and those who do not. His student, Greg Bahnsen, aided in some of the later developments of Van Tillian Presuppositionalism, and the Bahnsen Theological Seminary continues to promote presuppositional apologetics in its curriculum. John Frame, another student of Van Til, also continues to advocate a presuppositional approach, although he is generally more critical of Van Til's thought than Bahnsen was. Bahnsen's protégé, Michael R. Butler, has also been active in advancing the field. Among his contributions is a technical, metalogical study of transcendental arguments in general and the Transcendental argument for the existence of God in particular, which he wrote for Bahnsen's festschrift.

By 1952, presuppositional apologetics had acquired a new advocate in the Presbyterian theologian Gordon Clark. He embraced the label "presuppositional" since his approach to apologetics, emphasizing the priority of epistemology and an axiom of revelation, was more closely concerned with the logical order of assumptions than was Van Til. The differences between the two views on presuppositionalism, though few in number, caused a significant rift between the two men, and even after both Clark and Van Til had died, John Robbins (a theologian and former student of Clark's) and Bahnsen were often involved in heated exchanges.

In general, Van Til's approach is far more popular and widespread than Clark's.

== Varieties ==
=== Van Tillian presuppositionalism ===
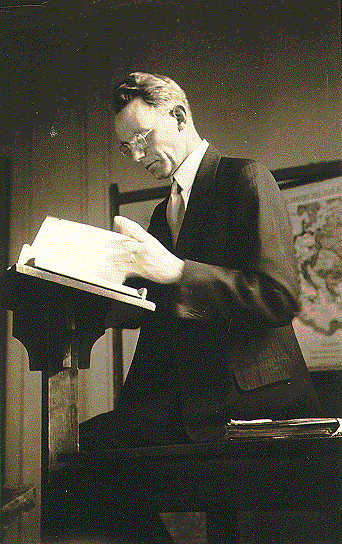
Cornelius Van Til

Apologists who follow Van Til earned the label "presuppositional" because of their central tenet that the Christian must at all times presuppose the supernatural revelation of the Bible as the ultimate arbiter of truth and error in order to know anything. Christians, they say, can assume nothing less because all human thought presupposes the existence of the God of the Bible. They claim that by accepting the assumptions of non-Christians, which fundamentally deny the Trinitarian God of the Bible, one could not even formulate an intelligible argument. Though Van Tillians do, at one point, "put themselves in the shoes" of the opponent, "for the sake of argument", to demonstrate where that position would lead, they claim that they can only do so because this is actually God's world. Man is actually God's creature, made in God's own image, and as such can never completely shut God out (in living or thinking). Hence there is always a common basis for dialogue, even though it is, in the presuppositionalist's view, a basis which the opponent is not usually willing to acknowledge and which is decidedly biased rather than neutral.

According to Frame, "[Van Til's] major complaints against competing apologetic methods are theological complaints, that is, that they compromise the incomprehensibility of God, total depravity, the clarity of natural revelation, God's comprehensive control over creation, and so on." Within their presuppositionalist framework, Van Tillians do often use foundational concepts for Thomistic and Evidentialist arguments (belief in the uniformity of natural causes, for example), but they are unwilling to grant that such beliefs are justifiable on "natural" (neutral) grounds. Rather, Van Tillians employ these beliefs, which they justify on Biblical grounds, in the service of transcendental arguments, which are a sort of meta-argument about foundational principles. And are necessary preconditions, in which the non-Christian's worldview is shown to be incoherent in and of itself and intelligible only because it borrows capital from the Christian worldview. For example, where evidentialists would take the uniformity of natural causes in a closed system as a neutral common starting point and construct a cosmological argument for an unmoved mover, Van Tillian presuppositionalists would ask for a justification for the belief in the uniformity of natural causes in a closed system, given the worldview of the opponent, attempting to show that such a belief presupposes the Christian worldview and is ultimately incompatible with the opposing worldview. (Note: Bahnsen argued that inductive reasoning cannot be justified on an atheistic worldview.) Van Til summarized the main drive of his apologetic by saying: "the only proof for the existence of God is that without God you couldn't prove anything."

Van Tillians also stress the importance of reckoning with "the noetic effects of sin" (that is, the effects of sin on the mind), which, they maintain, corrupt man's ability to understand God, the world, and himself aright. In their view, as a fallen creature, man does know the truth in each of these areas, but he seeks to find a different interpretation—one in which, as C. S. Lewis said, he is "on the bench" and God is "in the dock." The primary job of the apologist is, therefore, simply to confront the unbeliever with the fact that, while he is verbally denying the truth, he is nonetheless practically behaving in accord with it. Van Til illustrated this alleged inconsistency as a child, elevated on the father's knee, reaching up to slap his face, and Bahnsen used the analogy of a man breathing out air to make the argument that air doesn't exist.

Another important aspect of the Van Tillian apologetical program is the distinction between proof and persuasion. According to the first chapter of the Epistle to the Romans, man has ample proof in all of creation of God's existence and attributes but chooses to suppress it. Van Til likewise claimed that there are valid arguments to prove that the God of the Bible exists but that the unbeliever would not necessarily be persuaded by them because of his suppression of the truth, and therefore the apologist, he said, must present the truth regardless of whether anyone is actually persuaded by it (Frame notes that the apologist is here akin to the psychiatrist who presents the truth about the paranoid's delusions, trusting that his patient knows the truth at some level and can accept it—though Frame, as a Calvinist, would say the special intervention of God in the Holy Spirit is also required for the unbeliever to accept ultimate truths.) An implication of this position is that all arguments are "person relative" in the sense that one non-Christian might be persuaded by a particular argument and another might not be, depending on their background and experiences; even if the argument constitutes logically valid proof.

=== Clarkian presuppositionalism ===
Gordon Clark and his followers treat the truth of the Scriptures as the axiom of their system. Like all axioms, this axiom is considered to be self-evident truth, not to be proven, but used for proof. Theologians and philosophers strongly influenced by Dr. Clark include Francis Schaeffer, Carl F. H. Henry, Ronald Nash, Fuller Theological Seminary President Edward J. Carnell and John Robbins of the Trinity Foundation. Clark's system has been described by Gary Crampton as, "The 66 books of the Old and New Testaments are self-attesting and self-authenticating. Scripture stands in judgment over all books and ideas, and it is to be judged by no person or thing. The Bible alone is the Word of God. This is the Protestant principle of sola scriptura." However, the worldview that results from the axiom may be tested for consistency and comprehensiveness. Testing for internal contradiction exemplifies Clark's strict reliance on the laws of logic (he famously translates the first verse of the Gospel of John as "In the beginning was the Logic, and the Logic was with God, and the Logic was God.") Thus, in order to invalidate non-Christian worldviews, one must simply show how a different presupposition results in necessary logical contradictions, while showing that presupposing the Bible leads to no logical contradiction. By contrast, some Van Tillians have suggested that God as He has revealed Himself in Scripture reveals apparent paradoxes.

However, Clark allowed that presupposing axioms (or "first principles") themselves do not make a philosophical system true, including his own; the fact that all worldviews he examined other than Christianity had internal contradictions only made Christianity highly more probable as truth, but not necessarily so. Nonetheless, he believed that this method was effective in many practical cases (when arguing against, for instance, secular humanism or dialectical materialism) and that, in the end, each of us must simply choose (that is, make an informed selection) from among seemingly consistent worldviews the one that most adequately answers life's questions and seems the most internally coherent. Some Van Tillian critics suggest that the concept of coherence itself must be defined in terms of Christian presuppositions but is instead being used by Clark as a "neutral" principle for discerning the truth of any proposition.

Using this approach, Clark labored to expose the contradictions of many worldviews that were in vogue in his day and to defend the Christian worldview by proving its consistency over and against those who attacked it. His unflagging use of logic sometimes led him to what most Reformed theologians consider rather unorthodox ideas on such topics as the problem of evil—topics which are most often treated by theologians as paradoxes or apparent contradictions not resolvable by human logic. But Clark famously rejected the idea that Scripture teaches paradoxes and notion of "apparent contradiction", asking "apparent to whom?". He described an alleged biblical paradox as nothing more than "a charley-horse between the ears that can be eliminated by rational massage."

With regard to other schools of apologetics, Clark suggested that the cosmological argument was not just unpersuasive but also logically invalid (because it begged the question), and he similarly dismissed the other Thomistic arguments. As a staunch critic of all varieties of empiricism, he did not tend to make much use of evidential arguments, which yield likelihoods and probabilities rather than logical certainties (that is, either coherence or incoherence).

== See also ==
- Christian existential apologetics
- Christian philosophy
- Herman Dooyeweerd
- Neo-Calvinism
- Rationalism
- Transcendental argument for the existence of God

== Notes ==
=== Bibliography ===
- Bahnsen, Greg L (1998). Van Til's Apologetic: Readings & Analysis. Phillipsburg: Presbyterian & Reformed. ISBN 0-87552-098-7.
- ——— (2002). Booth, Robert R (ed.). Always Ready: Directions for Defending the Faith. Nacogdoches: Covenant. ISBN 0-915815-28-1.
- Bahnsen, Christian Greg; Stein, Gordon (1985), The Great Debate: Does God Exist? (PDF) (formal debate), University of California, Irvine: Bellevue Christian, archived from the original (PDF) on 2008-05-09.
- Butler, Michael (2002). "The Transcendental Argument for the Existence of God". In Schlissel, Steven M (ed.). The Standard Bearer: A Festschrift for Greg L. Bahnsen. Nacogdoches: Covenant. pp. 64–124.
- Carnell, Edward John (1948). An Introduction to Christian Apologetics: A Philosophic Defense of the Trinitarian-Theistic Faith. Grand Rapids: Wm B Eerdmans.
- Clark, Gordon Haddon (1995). Religion, Reason, and Revelation (3rd ed.). Unicoi: The Trinity Foundation. ISBN 0-940931-86-9.
- ——— (1998). A Christian View of Men and Things (3rd ed.). Unicoi: Trinity Foundation. ISBN 1-891777-01-7.
- ——— (1998b). Logic (3rd ed.). Unicoi: The Trinity Foundation. pp. 115–22. ISBN 0-940931-81-8.
- Crampton, W Gary (November–December 1990). "Does the Bible Contain Paradox?". Unicoi: The Trinity Foundation.
- Fernandes, Phil (1997), "Cornelius Van Til", Pressupositional Apologetics (doctoral dissertation), Biblical defense, archived from the original on 2006-04-26.
- Frame, John M (1976). Van Til: The Theologian. Reformed. ISBN 0-916034-02-X. Archived from the original on 2004-10-12.
- ——— (1987). The Doctrine of the Knowledge of God (Theology of Lordship). Philadelphia: Presbyterian & Reformed. ISBN 0-87552-262-9.
- ——— (1994). Apologetics to the Glory of God. Phillipsburg: Presbyterian & Reformed. ISBN 978-0-87552-243-2.
- ——— (1995). Cornelius Van Til: An Analysis of His Thought. Presbyterian & Reformed. ISBN 0-87552-220-3.
- ——— (2000). "Presuppositional Apologetics". In Cowan, Steven B (ed.). Five Views on Apologetics. Zondervan Publishing House. ISBN 0-310-22476-4.
- ——— (2006). "Presuppositional Apologetics". In Campbell-Jack, WC; McGrath, Gavin J; Evans, C Stephen (eds.). New Dictionary of Christian Apologetics. InterVarsity Press. ISBN 978-0-8308-2451-9.
- Geehan, ER, ed. (1980). Jerusalem and Athens: Critical Discussions on the Philosophy and Apologetics of Cornelius Van Til. Presbyterian & Reformed. ISBN 0-87552-489-3.
- Harrison, James M. "The Presuppositional Apologetic". Gospel outreach.
- Hoover, David P (1984). Gordon Clark's Extraordinary View of Men and Things. ISBN 0-944788-22-X.
- Lewis, Clive Staples (1970). God in the Dock: Essays on Theology and Ethics. Grand Rapids, MI: Wm. B. Eerdmans. ISBN 0-8028-0868-9.
- Oliphint, K Scott (1991). "Cornelius Van Til and the Reformation of Christian Apologetics". In van der Walt, BJ (ed.). Die Idee Van Reformasie: Gister En Vandag.
- Schwertley, Brian. "Secular Humanism". Reformed. Archived from the original on 2007-05-04.
- Sproul, RC; Gerstner, John; Lindsley, Arthur (1984). Classical Apologetics. Grand Rapids: Zondervan. ISBN 978-0-310-44951-5. "A friendly refutation of Cornelius Van Til's presuppositional apologetics."
- van Til, Cornelius (1967). The Defense of the Faith. Philadelphia: Presbyterian & Reformed. ISBN 9780875524832.
- ——— (1969). A Christian Theory of Knowledge. Philadelphia: Presbyterian & Reformed.
