= Metaphysical naturalism =

Philosophical worldview rejecting anything supernatural

Metaphysical naturalism (also called ontological naturalism, philosophical naturalism, or antisupernaturalism) is a philosophical worldview that holds that there is nothing but natural elements, principles, and relations of the kind studied by the natural sciences. Methodological naturalism is a philosophical basis for science. Some scholars believe that methodological naturalism presupposes metaphysical naturalism, while others argue that there are other possible ontological foundations for it. Broadly, the corresponding theological perspective is religious naturalism or spiritual naturalism. More specifically, metaphysical naturalism rejects the supernatural concepts and explanations that are part of many religions.

== Definition ==
In Carl Sagan’s words: "The Cosmos is all that is or ever was or ever will be."

According to Arthur C. Danto, naturalism, in recent usage, is a species of philosophical monism according to which whatever exists or happens is natural in the sense of being susceptible to explanation through methods which, although paradigmatically exemplified in the natural sciences, are continuous from domain to domain of objects and events. Hence, naturalism is polemically defined as repudiating the view that there exists or could exist any entities which lie, in principle, beyond the scope of scientific explanation.

Regarding the vagueness of the general term "naturalism", David Papineau traces the current usage to philosophers in early 20th century America such as John Dewey, Ernest Nagel, Sidney Hook, and Roy Wood Sellars: "So understood, 'naturalism' is not a particularly informative term as applied to contemporary philosophers. The great majority of contemporary philosophers would happily accept naturalism as just characterized—that is, they would both reject 'supernatural' entities, and allow that science is a possible route (if not necessarily the only one) to important truths about the 'human spirit'." Papineau remarks that philosophers widely regard naturalism as a "positive" term, and "few active philosophers nowadays are happy to announce themselves as 'non-naturalists'", while noting that "philosophers concerned with religion tend to be less enthusiastic about 'naturalism'" and that despite an "inevitable" divergence due to its popularity, if more narrowly construed, (to the chagrin of John McDowell, David Chalmers and Jennifer Hornsby, for example), those not so disqualified remain nonetheless content "to set the bar for 'naturalism' higher."

Philosopher and theologian Alvin Plantinga, a well-known critic of naturalism in general, comments: "Naturalism is presumably not a religion. In one very important respect, however, it resembles religion: it can be said to perform the cognitive function of a religion. There is that range of deep human questions to which a religion typically provides an answer ... Like a typical religion, naturalism gives a set of answers to these and similar questions".

== Science and naturalism ==
Metaphysical naturalism is the philosophical basis of science as described by Kate and Vitaly (2000). "There are certain philosophical assumptions made at the base of the scientific method – namely, 1) that reality is objective and consistent, 2) that humans have the capacity to perceive reality accurately, and that 3) rational explanations exist for elements of the real world. These assumptions are the basis of naturalism, the philosophy on which science is grounded. Philosophy is at least implicitly at the core of every decision we make or position we take, it is obvious that correct philosophy is a necessity for scientific inquiry to take place." Steven Schafersman, agrees that methodological naturalism is "the adoption or assumption of philosophical naturalism within scientific method with or without fully accepting or believing it ... science is not metaphysical and does not depend on the ultimate truth of any metaphysics for its success, but methodological naturalism must be adopted as a strategy or working hypothesis for science to succeed. We may therefore be agnostic about the ultimate truth of naturalism, but must nevertheless adopt it and investigate nature as if nature is all that there is."

== Various associated beliefs ==
Contemporary naturalists possess a wide diversity of beliefs within metaphysical naturalism. Most metaphysical naturalists have adopted some form of materialism or physicalism.

=== Natural sciences ===
According to metaphysical naturalism, if nature is all there is, the Big Bang, the formation of the Solar System, abiogenesis, and the processes involved in evolution would all be natural phenomena without supernatural influences.

=== The mind is a natural phenomenon ===
Metaphysical naturalists do not believe in a soul or spirit, nor in ghosts, and when explaining what constitutes the mind they rarely appeal to substance dualism. If one's mind, or rather one's identity and existence as a person, is entirely the product of natural processes, three conclusions follow according to W. T. Stace. Cognitive sciences are able to provide accounts of how cultural and psychological phenomena, such as religion, morality, language, and more, evolved through natural processes. Consciousness itself would also be susceptible to the same evolutionary principles that select other traits.

=== Utility of intelligence and reason ===
Metaphysical naturalists hold that intelligence is the refinement and improvement of naturally evolved faculties. Naturalists believe anyone who wishes to have more beliefs that are true than are false should seek to perfect and consistently employ their reason in testing and forming beliefs. Empirical methods (especially those of proven use in the sciences) are unsurpassed for discovering the facts of reality, while methods of pure reason alone can securely discover logical errors.

=== View on the soul ===
According to metaphysical naturalism, immateriality being unprocedural and unembodiable, is not differentiable from nothingness. The immaterial nothingness of the soul, being a non-ontic state, is not compartmentalizable nor attributable to different persons and different memories, it is non-operational and it (nothingness) cannot be manifested in different states in order it represents information.

== Arguments for metaphysical naturalism ==
=== Argument from physical minds ===
In his critique of mind–body dualism, Paul Churchland writes that it is always the case that the mental substance and/or properties of the person are significantly changed or compromised via brain damage. If the mind were a completely separate substance from the brain, how could it be possible that every single time the brain is injured, the mind is also injured? Indeed, it is very frequently the case that one can even predict and explain the kind of mental or psychological deterioration or change that human beings will undergo when specific parts of their brains are damaged. So the question that the dualist must confront is how all of this can be explained if the mind is a separate and immaterial substance from, or if its properties are ontologically independent of, the brain.

Modern experiments have demonstrated that the relation between brain and mind is much more than simple correlation. By damaging, or manipulating, specific areas of the brain repeatedly under controlled conditions (e.g. in monkeys) and reliably obtaining the same results in measures of mental state and abilities, neuroscientists have shown that the relation between damage to the brain and mental deterioration is likely causal. This conclusion is further supported by data from the effects of neuro-active chemicals (e.g., those affecting neurotransmitters) on mental functions, but also from research on neurostimulation (direct electrical stimulation of the brain, including transcranial magnetic stimulation).

Critics such as Edward Feser and Tyler Burge have described these arguments as "neurobabble", and consider them as flawed or as being compatible with other metaphysical ideas like Thomism. According to the philosopher Stephen Evans:

We did not need neurophysiology to come to know that a person whose head is bashed in with a club quickly loses his or her ability to think or have any conscious processes. Why should we not think of neurophysiological findings as giving us detailed, precise knowledge of something that human beings have always known, or at least could have known, which is that the mind (at least in this mortal life) requires and depends on a functioning brain? We now know a lot more than we used to know about precisely how the mind depends on the body. However, that the mind depends on the body, at least prior to death, is surely not something discovered in the 20th century.

=== Argument from cognitive biases ===
In contrast with the argument from reason or evolutionary argument against naturalism, it can be argued that cognitive biases are better explained by natural causes than as the work of God.

== Arguments against ==
Arguments against metaphysical naturalism include the following examples:

=== Argument from reason ===
Philosophers and theologians such as Victor Reppert, William Hasker, and Alvin Plantinga have developed an argument for dualism dubbed the "argument from reason". They credit C.S. Lewis with first bringing the argument to light in his book Miracles; Lewis called the argument "The Cardinal Difficulty of Naturalism", which was the title of chapter three of Miracles.

The argument postulates that if, as naturalism entails, all of our thoughts are the effect of a physical cause, then we have no reason for assuming that they are also the consequent of a reasonable ground. However, knowledge is apprehended by reasoning from ground to consequent. Therefore, if naturalism were true, there would be no way of knowing it (or anything else), except by a fluke.

Through this logic, the statement "I have reason to believe naturalism is valid" is inconsistent in the same manner as "I never tell the truth." That is, to conclude its truth would eliminate the grounds from which it reaches it. To summarize the argument in the book, Lewis quotes J. B. S. Haldane, who appeals to a similar line of reasoning:

If my mental processes are determined wholly by the motions of atoms in my brain, I have no reason to suppose that my beliefs are true ... and hence I have no reason for supposing my brain to be composed of atoms.

— J. B. S. Haldane, Possible Worlds, page 209

In his essay "Is Theology Poetry?", Lewis himself summarises the argument in a similar fashion when he writes:

If minds are wholly dependent on brains, and brains on biochemistry, and biochemistry (in the long run) on the meaningless flux of the atoms, I cannot understand how the thought of those minds should have any more significance than the sound of the wind in the trees.

— C. S. Lewis, The Weight of Glory and Other Addresses, page 139

But Lewis later agreed with Elizabeth Anscombe's response to his Miracles argument. She showed that an argument could be valid and ground-consequent even if its propositions were generated via physical cause and effect by non-rational factors. Similar to Anscombe, Richard Carrier and John Beversluis have written extensive objections to the argument from reason on the untenability of its first postulate.

=== Evolutionary argument against naturalism ===
Notre Dame philosophy of religion professor and Christian apologist Alvin Plantinga argues, in his evolutionary argument against naturalism, that the probability that evolution has produced humans with reliable true beliefs, is low or inscrutable, unless their evolution was guided, for example, by God. According to David Kahan of the University of Glasgow, in order to understand how beliefs are warranted, a justification must be found in the context of supernatural theism, as in Plantinga's epistemology. (See also Supernormal stimuli.)

Plantinga argues that together, naturalism and evolution provide an insurmountable "defeater for the belief that our cognitive faculties are reliable", i.e., a skeptical argument along the lines of Descartes' evil demon or brain in a vat.

Take philosophical naturalism to be the belief that there aren't any supernatural entities—no such person as God, for example, but also no other supernatural entities, and nothing at all like God. My claim was that naturalism and contemporary evolutionary theory are at serious odds with one another—and this despite the fact that the latter is ordinarily thought to be one of the main pillars supporting the edifice of the former. (Of course I am not attacking the theory of evolution, or anything in that neighborhood; I am instead attacking the conjunction of naturalism with the view that human beings have evolved in that way. I see no similar problems with the conjunction of theism and the idea that human beings have evolved in the way contemporary evolutionary science suggests.) More particularly, I argued that the conjunction of naturalism with the belief that we human beings have evolved in conformity with current evolutionary doctrine... is in a certain interesting way self-defeating or self-referentially incoherent.

— Alvin Plantinga, "Introduction" in Naturalism Defeated?: Essays on Plantinga's Evolutionary Argument Against Naturalism

Branden Fitelson of the University of California, Berkeley and Elliott Sober of the University of Wisconsin–Madison argue that Plantinga must show that the combination of evolution and naturalism also defeats the more modest claim that "at least a non-negligible minority of our beliefs are true". According to them, he must also show that defects such as cognitive bias are nonetheless consistent with being made in the image of a rational God. Whereas evolutionary science already acknowledges that cognitive processes are unreliable, including the fallibility of the scientific enterprise itself, Plantinga's hyperbolic doubt is no more a defeater for naturalism than it is for theistic metaphysics founded upon a non-deceiving God who designed the human mind: "[neither] can construct a non-question-begging argument that refutes global skepticism." Plantinga's argument has also been criticized by philosopher Daniel Dennett and independent scholar Richard Carrier who argue that a cognitive apparatus for truth-finding can result from natural selection.

=== Argument from first-person perspectives ===
Christian List argues that the existence of first-person perspectives, i.e., one existing as oneself and not as someone else, refutes physicalism. He argues that since first-personal facts cannot supervene on physical facts, this refutes not only physicalism, but also most forms of dualism that have purely third-personal metaphysics. List also argues that there is a "quadrilemma" for theories of consciousness: that at most three of the following metaphysical claims can be true: "first-person realism", "non-solipsism", "non-fragmentation", and "one world"—and thus at least one of them must be false. He has proposed a model he calls the "many-worlds theory of consciousness" to reconcile the subjective nature of consciousness without lapsing into solipsism. These ideas are related to the vertiginous question proposed by Benj Hellie.

== See also ==
- Atheism
- Daoism
- Dysteleology
- Ethical naturalism
- Hylomorphism
- Liberal naturalism
- Materialism Controversy
- Natural Supernaturalism
- Naturalist computationalism
- Naturalistic fallacy
- Naturalistic pantheism
- Platonized naturalism
- Poetic naturalism
- Reductive materialism
- Religious naturalism
- Revisionary materialism
- School of Naturalists
- Scientism
- Scientistic materialism
- Spiritual naturalism
- Supernaturalism
- Transcendental naturalism
