= David Kyle Johnson =

American philosophy professor (born 1977)

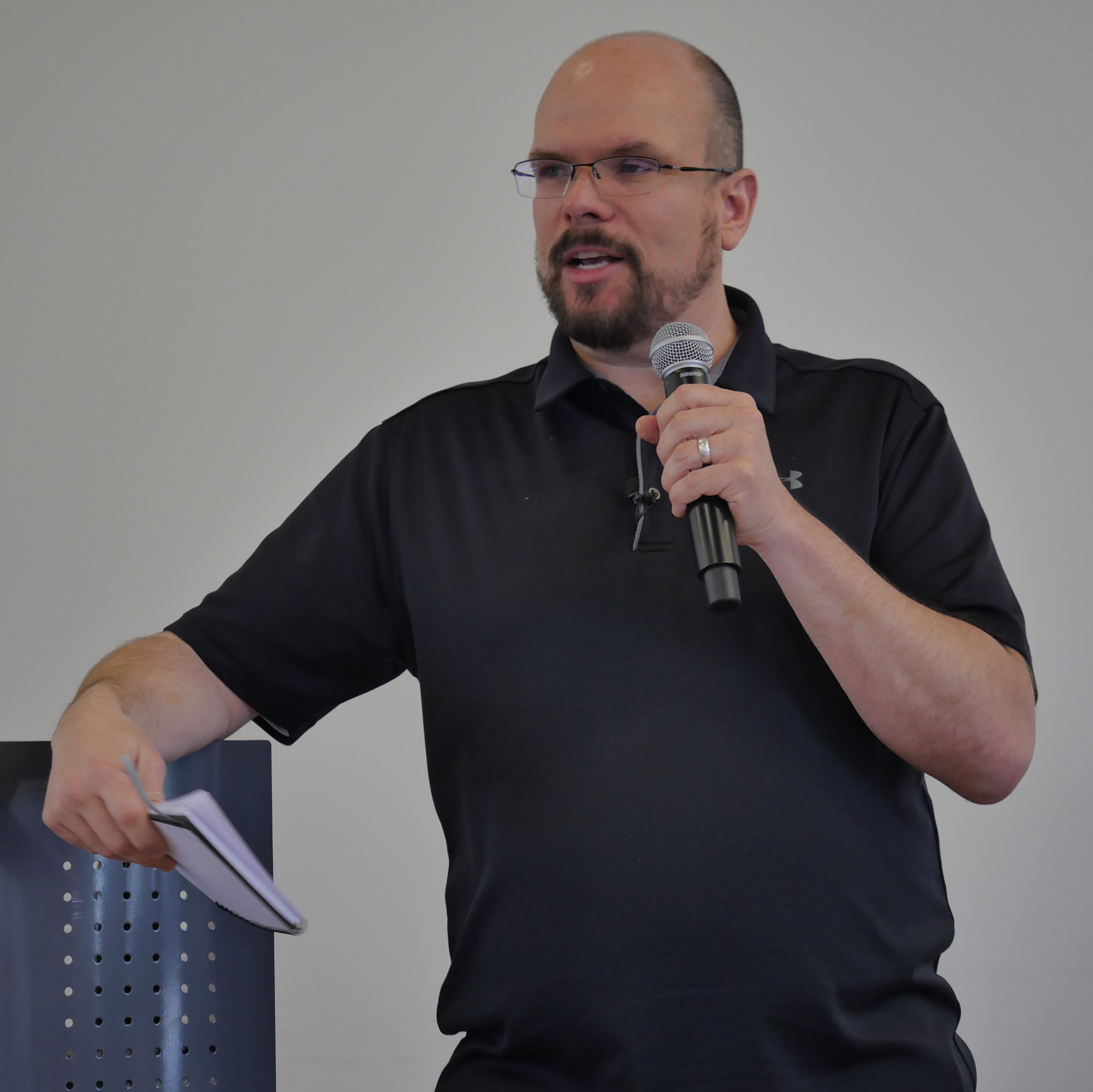
- Johnson at LiliCon 2026
- Born: 1977 (age 48–49); Guymon, Oklahoma, USA
- Citizenship: American
- Occupations: Professor and author
- Awards: Kenneth Merrill Graduate Teaching Award

David Kyle Johnson (born 1977) is a Professor of Philosophy at King's College in Wilkes-Barre, Pennsylvania. He specializes in logic, metaphysics, free will, and philosophy of religion.

== Early life ==
Johnson was born in Guymon, Oklahoma in 1977.

He attended the University of Oklahoma (from 2000 to 2006) where he earned a master's degree and doctorate in philosophy.

== Academic philosophy ==
Johnson's first published article, God, fatalism, and temporal ontology, was based on his dissertation Divine Omniscience and the Fatalist Dilemma.

He has written extensively and debated (in print) with Victor Reppert on the Argument from reason, a debate which began in C. S. Lewis's Christian Apologetics : Pro and Con, edited by Gregory Bassham. Johnson asserts that Reppert's argument fails for three reasons: 1) It "loads the die" by falsely assuming that naturalism, by definition, can't include mental causation "on the basic level". 2) Physical processes can reliably produce true beliefs. And 3) "reasoning isn’t necessarily mental".

In his 2013 article A Refutation of Skeptical Theism, Johnson argued that, contrary to the claims of skeptical theists, observing seemingly unjustified evil does reduce the probability of God's existence. He subsequently exchanged views on the topic with Timothy Perrine.

Johnson has published articles in journals such as Sophia, Religious Studies, Philo, SHERM (Socio-Historical Examination of Religion and Ministry), and Science, Religion, and Culture, along with a trilogy of articles, on the existence of souls, free will, and God, for the journal Think.

== Popular philosophy ==
Johnson has produced three lectures for The Great Courses series: Exploring Metaphysics (2014), The Big Questions of Philosophy (2016) and Sci-Phi: Science Fiction as Philosophy (2018).

He has edited three books for William Irwin’s Philosophy and Pop Culture series (released via Blackwell Publishing): Black Mirror and Philosophy: Dark Reflections, Inception and Philosophy: Because It's Never Just a Dream, and Heroes and Philosophy: Buy the Book, Save the World. He also co-edited (with William Irwin) Introducing Philosophy Through Pop Culture: From Socrates to South Park, Hume to House.

Johnson gave a popular Talks at Google presentation on his book Inception and Philosophy.

He is the editor of The Palgrave Handbook of Popular Culture as Philosophy.

He took on the title of executive officer for the Global Center for Religious Research (GCRR) in 2020.

In 2015, Johnson released The Myths that Stole Christmas: Seven Misconceptions that Hijacked the Holiday (and How We Can Take It Back).

Johnson has presented many arguments against lying to children about the existence of Santa Claus. Specifically, he suggests that the Santa Lie should be avoided because "It's a lie, it degrades your parental trustworthiness, it encourages credulity, it does not encourage imagination, and it's equivalent to bribing your kids for good behavior."

He also appeared on Sean Hannity’s Fox News commentary program, Hannity, to talk about the issue; afterward Johnson wrote “Sorry Sean Hannity, the Truth About Santa Isn’t “Fake News”.

Johnson maintains two blogs for Psychology Today: "Plato on Pop" and "A Logical Take."

He has also written for the London School of Economics’ Blog on American Politics and Policy.

Bill Nye has praised Johnson for his work and for creating a personal interest in philosophy. Nye has said, “I read his book so many times, it fell apart. I had to get another copy.”

== Awards ==
Whilst studying in Oklahoma Johnson won the Kenneth Merrill Graduate Teaching Award.

In 2011, the American Philosophical Association’s committee on public philosophy gave him an award for his ability to make philosophy accessible to the general public.

== Bibliography ==
=== Books authored ===
- Exploring Metaphysics (2014)
- The Myths that Stole Christmas: Seven Misconceptions that Hijacked the Holiday (and How We Can Take It Back) (2015)
- The Big Questions of Philosophy (2016)
- Sci-Phi: Science Fiction as Philosophy (2018)

=== Books edited ===
- Heroes and Philosophy: Buy the Book, Save the World (2009)
- Introducing Philosophy Through Pop Culture: From Socrates to South Park, Hume to House (2010)
- Inception and Philosophy: Because It's Never Just a Dream (2011)
- Black Mirror and Philosophy: Dark Reflections (2019)
