= Evolutionary argument against naturalism =

Philosophical argument

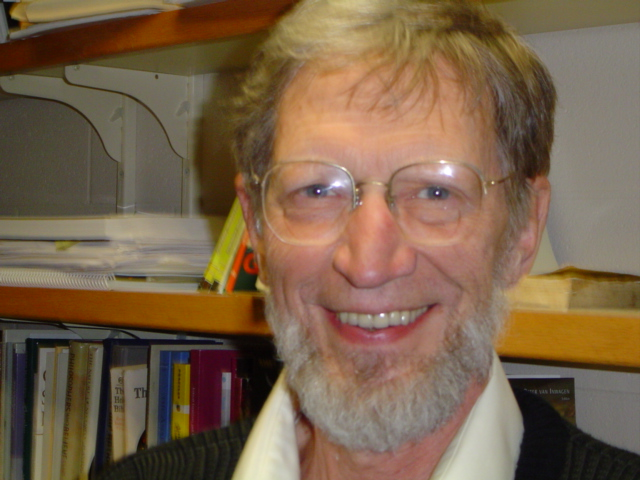
Alvin Plantinga, who first formally introduced the argument

The evolutionary argument against naturalism (EAAN) is a philosophical argument asserting a problem with believing both evolution and philosophical naturalism simultaneously. The argument was first formally proposed by Alvin Plantinga in 1993. The EAAN argues that the combined belief in both evolutionary theory and naturalism is epistemically self-defeating. The argument states that if both evolution and naturalism are true, then the probability of having reliable cognitive faculties is low, which then destroys any reason to believe in evolution or naturalism in the first place, as the cognitive faculties one used to deduce evolution or naturalism as logically valid are no longer reliable. The argument "raises issues of interest to epistemologists, philosophers of mind, evolutionary biologists, and philosophers of religion". It comes as an expansion of the argument from reason, although the two are separate philosophical arguments.

== Development of the idea ==
The idea that "naturalism" undercuts its own justification was put forward by Arthur Balfour. C. S. Lewis popularised it in the first edition of his book Miracles in 1947. Similar arguments were advanced by Richard Clyde Taylor in Metaphysics, as well as by Stephen Clark, Richard Purtill and J. P. Moreland. In 2003 Victor Reppert developed a similar argument in detail in his book C.S. Lewis's Dangerous Idea, In Defense of the Argument from Reason. Contemporary philosophers who have employed a similar argument against physical determinism are James Jordan and William Hasker.

Plantinga proposed his "evolutionary argument against naturalism" in 1993. In the twelfth chapter of his book Warrant and Proper Function, Plantinga developed Lewis' idea, and constructed two formal arguments against evolutionary naturalism. He further developed the idea in an unpublished manuscript entitled "Naturalism Defeated" and in his 2000 book Warranted Christian Belief, and expanded the idea in Naturalism Defeated?, a 2002 anthology edited by James Beilby. He also responded to several objections to the argument in his essay "Reply to Beilby's Cohorts" in Beilby's anthology.

In the 2008 publication Knowledge of God Plantinga presented a formulation of the argument that solely focused on semantic epiphenomenalism instead of the former four jointly exhaustive categories.

Plantinga repeats the argument in his 2011 book Where the Conflict Really Lies: Science, Religion, and Naturalism.

== Plantinga's 1993 formulation of the argument ==
Plantinga argues that combining naturalism and evolution is self-defeating, because, under these assumptions, the probability that humans have reliable cognitive faculties is low or inscrutable. He claimed that several thinkers, including C. S. Lewis, had seen that evolutionary naturalism seemed to lead to a deep and pervasive skepticism and to the conclusion that our unreliable cognitive or belief-producing faculties cannot be trusted to produce more true beliefs than false beliefs. He claimed that "Darwin himself had worries along these lines" and quoted from an 1881 letter:

But then with me the horrid doubt always arises whether the convictions of man's mind, which has been developed from the mind of the lower animals, are of any value or at all trustworthy. Would any one trust in the convictions of a monkey's mind, if there are any convictions in such a mind?

— Charles Darwin, to William Graham 3 July 1881

In the letter, Darwin had expressed agreement with William Graham's claim that natural laws implied purpose and the belief that the universe was "not the result of chance", but again showed his doubts about such beliefs and left the matter as insoluble. Darwin only had this doubt about questions beyond the scope of science, and thought science was well within the scope of an evolved mind. Michael Ruse said that by presenting it as "Darwin's doubt" that evolutionary naturalism is self-defeating, Plantinga failed to note that Darwin at once excused himself from philosophical matters he did not feel competent to consider. Others, such as Evan Fales, agreed that this citation allowed Plantinga to call the source of the problem EAAN addresses Darwin's Doubt. Also, contrary to Ruse's claim, Plantinga gave the name "Darwin's Doubt" not to the idea that the conjunction of naturalism and evolution is self-defeating, but rather to the view that given naturalism and evolution our cognitive faculties are unlikely to be reliable. Plantinga asserts that "this doubt arises for naturalists or atheists, but not for those who believe in God. That is because if God has created us in his image, then even if he fashioned us by some evolutionary means, he would presumably want us to resemble him in being able to know; but then most of what we believe might be true even if our minds have developed from those of the lower animals."

Plantinga defined:

- N as naturalism, which he defined as "the idea that there is no such person as God or anything like God; we might think of it as high-octane atheism or perhaps atheism-plus."
- E as the belief that human beings have evolved in conformity with current evolutionary theory
- R as the proposition that our faculties are "reliable", where, roughly, a cognitive faculty is "reliable" if the great bulk of its deliverances are true. He specifically cited the example of a thermometer stuck at 72 °F (22 °C) placed in an environment which happened to be at 72 °F as an example of something that is not "reliable" in this sense

and suggested that the conditional probability of R given N and E, or P(R|N&E), is low or inscrutable.

Plantinga's argument began with the observation that our beliefs can only have evolutionary consequences if they affect behaviour. To put this another way, natural selection does not directly select for true beliefs, but rather for advantageous behaviours. Plantinga distinguished the various theories of mind-body interaction into four jointly exhaustive categories:

1. epiphenomenalism, where behaviour is not caused by beliefs. "if this way of thinking is right, beliefs would be invisible to evolution" so P(R|N&E) would be low or inscrutable
2. Semantic epiphenomenalism, where beliefs have a causative link to behaviour but not by virtue of their semantic content. Under this theory, a belief would be some form of long-term neuronal event. However, on this view P(R|N&E) would be low because the semantic content of beliefs would be invisible to natural selection, and it is semantic content that determines truth-value.
3. Beliefs are causally efficacious with respect to behaviour, but maladaptive, in which case P(R|N&E) would be low, as R would be selected against.
4. Beliefs are causally efficacious with respect to behaviour and also adaptive, but they may still be false. Since behaviour is caused by both belief and desire, and desire can lead to false belief, natural selection would have no reason for selecting true but non-adaptive beliefs over false but adaptive beliefs. Thus P(R|N&E) in this case would also be low. Plantinga pointed out that innumerable belief-desire pairs could account for a given behaviour; for example, that of a prehistoric hominid fleeing a tiger:

Perhaps Paul very much likes the idea of being eaten, but when he sees a tiger, always runs off looking for a better prospect, because he thinks it unlikely the tiger he sees will eat him. This will get his body parts in the right place so far as survival is concerned, without involving much by way of true belief. ... Or perhaps he thinks the tiger is a large, friendly, cuddly pussycat and wants to pet it; but he also believes that the best way to pet it is to run away from it. ... Clearly there are any number of belief-cum-desire systems that equally fit a given bit of behaviour.

Thus, Plantinga argued, the probability that our minds are reliable under a conjunction of philosophical naturalism and naturalistic evolution is low or inscrutable. Therefore, to assert that naturalistic evolution is true also asserts that one has a low or unknown probability of being right. This, Plantinga argued, epistemically defeats the belief that naturalistic evolution is true and that ascribing truth to naturalism and evolution is internally dubious or inconsistent.

== Responses ==
=== Fitelson and Sober's response ===
In a 1998 paper Branden Fitelson of the University of California, Berkeley and Elliott Sober of the University of Wisconsin–Madison set out to show that the arguments presented by Plantinga contain serious errors. Plantinga construed evolutionary naturalism as the conjunction of the idea that human cognitive faculties arose through evolutionary mechanisms, and naturalism which he equated to atheism. Plantinga tried to throw doubt on this conjunction with a preliminary argument that the conjunction is probably false, and a main argument that it is self-defeating; if you believe it you should stop believing it.

First, they criticised Plantinga's use of a Bayesian framework in which he arbitrarily assigned initial probabilities without empirical evidence, predetermining the outcome in favor of traditional theism, and described this as a recipe for replacing any non-deterministic theory in the natural sciences, so that for example a probable outcome predicted by quantum mechanics would be seen as the outcome of God's will. Plantinga's use of R to mean that "the great bulk" of our beliefs are true fails to deal with the cumulative effect of adding beliefs which have variable reliability about different subjects. Plantinga asserted that the traditional theist believes being made in God's image includes a reflection of divine powers as a knower, but cognitive science finds human reasoning subject to biases and systematic error. Traditional theology is not shown to predict this varying reliability as well as science, and there is the theological problem of the omnipotent Creator producing such imperfection. They described how Plantinga set out various scenarios of belief affecting evolutionary success, but undercut the low probability he previously required when he suggested an "inscrutable" probability, and by ignoring availability of variants he fails to show that false beliefs will be equally adaptive as his claim of low probability assumes. Even if his claims of improbability were correct, that need not affect belief in evolution, and they considered it would be more sensible to accept that evolutionary processes sometimes have improbable outcomes.

They assessed Plantinga's main argument—which asserts that since the reliability of evolutionary naturalism is low or of inscrutable value, those believing it should withhold assent from its reliability, and thus withhold assent from anything else they believe including evolutionary naturalism, which is therefore self-defeating—and found it unconvincing, having already disputed his argument that the reliability is low. Even if E&N defeated the claim that 'at least 90% of our beliefs are true,' they considered that Plantinga must show that it also defeats the more modest claim that 'at least a non-negligible minority of our beliefs are true'. They considered his sentiment that high probability is required for rational belief to be repudiated by philosophical lessons such as the lottery paradox, and that each step in his argument requires principles different from those he had described. They concluded that Plantinga has drawn attention to unreliability of cognitive processes that is already taken into account by evolutionary scientists who accept that science is a fallible exercise, and appreciate the need to be as scrupulous as possible with the fallible cognitive processes available. His hyperbolic doubt as a defeater for evolutionary naturalism is equally a defeater for theists who rely on their belief that their mind was designed by a non-deceiving God, and neither "can construct a non-question-begging argument that refutes global skepticism."

=== Robbins' response ===
Indiana University South Bend Professor of Philosophy J. Wesley Robbins contended that Plantinga's argument applied only to Cartesian philosophies of mind but not to pragmatist philosophies of mind. Robbins' argument, stated roughly, was that while in a Cartesian mind beliefs can be identified with no reference to the environmental factors that caused them, in a pragmatic mind they are identifiable only with reference to those factors. That is to say, in a pragmatic mind beliefs would not even exist if their holder had not come in contact with external belief-producing phenomena in the first place.

=== Naturalism Defeated? ===
A collection of essays entitled Naturalism Defeated? (2002) contains responses by 11 philosophers to EAAN. According to James K. Beilby, editor of the volume, Plantinga's proposition "raises issues of interest to epistemologists, philosophers of mind, evolutionary biologists, and philosophers of religion". The responsive essays include the following:

- William Ramsey argued that Plantinga "overlooks the most sensible way ... to get clear on how truth can be a property of beliefs that bestows an advantage on cognitive systems". He also argued that some of our cognitive faculties are slightly unreliable, and E&N seems better suited than theism to explain this imperfection.
- Jerry Fodor argued that there is a plausible historical scenario according to which our minds were selected because their cognitive mechanisms produced, by and large, adaptive true beliefs.
- Evan Fales argued that Plantinga had not demonstrated that the reliability of our cognitive faculties is improbable, given Neo-Darwinism, and emphasizes that "if Plantinga's argument fails here, then he will not have shown that [N&E] is probabilistically incoherent." Also, given how expensive (in biological terms) our brain is, and considering we are rather unremarkable creatures apart from our brains, it would be quite improbable that our rational faculties be selected if unreliable. "Most of our eggs are in that basket," said Fales. Fales argued along the same as Robbins: take a mental representation, of heat, for example. Only so long as it is really caused by heat can we call it a mental representation of heat; otherwise, it is not at all a mental representation, of heat or of anything else: "so long as representations [semantics] are causally linked to the world via the syntactic structures in the brain to which they correspond [syntax], this will guarantee that syntax maps onto semantics in a generally truth-preserving way." This is a direct response to one of Plantinga's scenarios where, according to Plantinga, false-belief generating mechanisms may have been naturally selected.
- Michael Bergmann suggested that Thomas Reid offered the resources for a commonsense (Reidian) defense of naturalism against EAAN.
- Ernest Sosa drew on features of Descartes' epistemology to argue that while "[i]ssues of circularity do arise as to how we can rationally and knowledgeably adopt [an epistemically propitious] view about our own epistemic powers," nonetheless, "these problems are not exclusive to naturalism."
- James Van Cleve suggested that even if the probability thesis is true, it need not deliver an undefeated defeater to R, and that even if one has a defeater for R, it does not follow that one has a defeater for everything.
- Richard Otte thought that the argument "ignore[d] other information we have that would make R likely."
- William Talbott suggested that "Plantinga has misunderstood the role of undercutting defeaters in reasoning."
- Trenton Merricks said that "in general, inferences from low or inscrutable conditional probability to defeat are unjustified."
- William Alston argued that the claim that P(R/N&E) is low is poorly supported; if, instead, it is inscrutable, this has no clear relevance to the claim that (1) is a defeater for N&E.

Naturalism Defeated? also included Plantinga's replies to both the critical responses contained in the book and to some objections raised by others, including Fitelson & Sober:

- Plantinga expounded the notion of Rationality Defeaters in terms of his theory of warrant and proper function and distinguishes between Humean Defeaters and Purely Alethic Defeaters, suggesting that although a naturalist will continue to assume R "but (if he reflects on the matter) he will also think, sadly enough, that what he can't help believing is unlikely to be true."
- Plantinga argued that semantic epiphenomenalism is very likely on N&E because, if materialism is true, beliefs would have to be neurophysiological events whose propositional content cannot plausibly enter the causal chain. He also suggests that the reliability of a cognitive process requires the truth of a substantial proportion of the beliefs it produces, and that a process which delivered beliefs whose probability of truth was in the neighbourhood of 0.5 would have a vanishingly unlikely chance of producing (say) 1000 beliefs 75% of which were true.
- In The conditionalisation problem, Plantinga discussed the possibility that N^{+} i.e. "Naturalism plus R," could be a basic belief thus staving off defeat of R, suggesting that this procedure cannot be right in general otherwise every defeater could automatically be defeated, introducing the term "defeater-deflector" and initially exploring the conditions under which a defeater-deflector can be valid.
- Plantinga concluded that the objections pose a challenge to EAAN, but that there are successful arguments against the objections.

=== Ruse's response ===
In a chapter titled "The New Creationism: Its Philosophical Dimension", in The Cultures of Creationism, philosopher of science Michael Ruse discussed EAAN. He argued:

- That the EAAN conflates methodological and metaphysical naturalism.
- That "we need to make a distinction that Plantinga fudges" between "the world as we can in some sense discover" and "the world in some absolute sense, metaphysical reality if you like." Then, "Once this distinction is made, Plantinga's refutation of naturalism no longer seems so threatening."
- That "It is certainly the case that organisms are sometimes deceived about the world of appearances and that this includes humans. Sometimes we are systematically deceived, as instructors in elementary psychology classes delight in demonstrating. Moreover, evolution can often give good reasons as to why we are deceived." We know there are misconceptions arising from selection as we can measure them against reliable touchstones, but in Plantinga's hypothesised deceptions we are deceived all the time which is "not how evolution's deceptions work". He comments that in Plantinga's thinking we have confusion between the world as we know it, and the world as it might be knowable in some ultimate way, but "If we are all in an illusion then it makes no sense to talk of illusion, for we have no touchstone of reality to make absolute judgements."

Ruse concluded his discussion of the EAAN by stating:

To be honest, even if Plantinga's argument [the EAAN] worked, I would still want to know where theism ends (and what form this theism must take) and where science can take over. Is it the case that evolution necessarily cannot function, or it is merely false and in another God-created world it might have held in some way—and if so, in what way? Plantinga has certainly not shown that the theist must be a creationist, even though his own form of theism is creationism.

=== Other responses ===
In 2020, a philosophy paper was published called "Does the Evolutionary Argument Against Naturalism Defeat God's Beliefs?", which argued that if the EAAN provides the naturalist with a defeater for all of her beliefs, then an extension of it appears to provide God with a defeater for all of his beliefs.

== C. S. Lewis framing ==
Supposing there was no intelligence behind the universe, no creative mind. In that case, nobody designed my brain for the purpose of thinking. It is merely that when the atoms inside my skull happen, for physical or chemical reasons, to arrange themselves in a certain way, this gives me, as a by-product, the sensation I call thought. But, if so, how can I trust my own thinking to be true? It's like upsetting a milk jug and hoping that the way it splashes itself will give you a map of London. But if I can't trust my own thinking, of course I can't trust the arguments leading to atheism, and therefore have no reason to be an atheist, or anything else. Unless I believe in God, I cannot believe in thought: so I can never use thought to disbelieve in God.

== Plantinga's 2008 formulation of the argument ==
In the 2008 publication Knowledge of God Plantinga presented a formulation of the argument that solely focused on semantic epiphenomenalism instead of the former four jointly exhaustive categories.

Plantinga stated that from a materialist's point of view a belief will be a neuronal event. In this conception a belief will have two different sorts of properties:

- electro-chemical or neurophysiological properties (NP properties for short)
- and the property of having content (It will have to be the belief that p, for some proposition p).

Plantinga thought that we have something of an idea as to the history of NP properties: structures with these properties have come to exist by small increments, each increment such that it has proved to be useful in the struggle for survival. But he then asked how the content property of a belief came about: "How does it [the content] get to be associated in that way with a given proposition?"

He said that materialists offer two theories for this question: According to the first, content supervenes upon NP properties; according to the second, content is reducible to NP properties. (He noted that if content properties are reducible to NP properties, then they also supervene upon them.) He explained the two theories as follows:

- Reducibility: A belief is a disjunction of conjunctions of NP properties.
- Strong Supervenience (S+): For any possible worlds W and W* and any structures S and S*, if S has the same NP properties in W as S* has in W*, then S has the same content in W as S* has in W*. Supervenience can either be broadly logical supervenience or nomic supervenience.

Plantinga argued that neural structures that constitute beliefs have content, in the following way: "At a certain level of complexity, these neural structures start to display content. Perhaps this starts gradually and early on (possibly C. elegans [a small worm with a nervous system composed of only a few neurons] displays just the merest glimmer of consciousness and the merest glimmer of content), or perhaps later and more abruptly; that doesn't matter. What does matter is that at a certain level of complexity of neural structures, content appears. This is true whether content properties are reducible to NP properties or supervene on them." So given materialism some neural structures at a given level of complexity acquire content and become beliefs. The question then is according to Plantinga: "what is the likelihood, given materialism, that the content that thus arises is in fact true?"

This way of proceeding replaced the first step of Plantinga's earlier versions of the argument.

== Criticism by eliminative materialists ==
The EAAN claims that according to naturalism, evolution must operate on beliefs, desires, and other contentful mental states for a biological organism to have a reliable cognitive faculty such as the brain. Eliminative materialism maintains that propositional attitudes such as beliefs and desires, among other intentional mental states that have content, cannot be explained on naturalism and therefore concludes that such entities do not exist. It is not clear whether the EAAN would be successful against a conception of naturalism which accepts eliminative materialism to be the correct scientific account of human cognition.

== EAAN, intelligent design and theistic evolution ==
In his discussion of EAAN, Michael Ruse described Plantinga as believing in the truth of the attack on evolution presented by intelligent design advocate Phillip E. Johnson, and as having endorsed Johnson's book Darwin on Trial. Ruse said that Plantinga took the conflict between science and religion further than Johnson, seeing it as not just a clash between the philosophies of naturalism and theism, but as an attack on the true philosophy of theism by what he considers the incoherent and inconsistent philosophy of naturalism.

Plantinga has stated that EAAN is not directed against "the theory of evolution, or the claim that human beings have evolved from simian ancestors, or anything in that neighborhood". He also claimed that the problems raised by EAAN do not apply to the conjunction of theism and contemporary evolutionary science. In his essay Evolution and Design Plantinga outlines different ways in which theism and evolutionary theory can be combined.

In the foreword to the anthology Naturalism Defeated? James Beilby wrote: "Plantinga's argument should not be mistaken for an argument against evolutionary theory in general or, more specifically, against the claim that humans might have evolved from more primitive life forms. Rather, the purpose of his argument is to show that the denial of the existence of a creative deity is problematic."

== See also ==
- Epistemology
- Evolution of human intelligence
- Evolution
- Evolutionary epistemology
- Hyperbolic doubt
- Naturalism (philosophy)
- Philosophy of mind
- Problem of mental causation
- Skepticism
- Theism
