= David Macarthur =

Australian philosopher

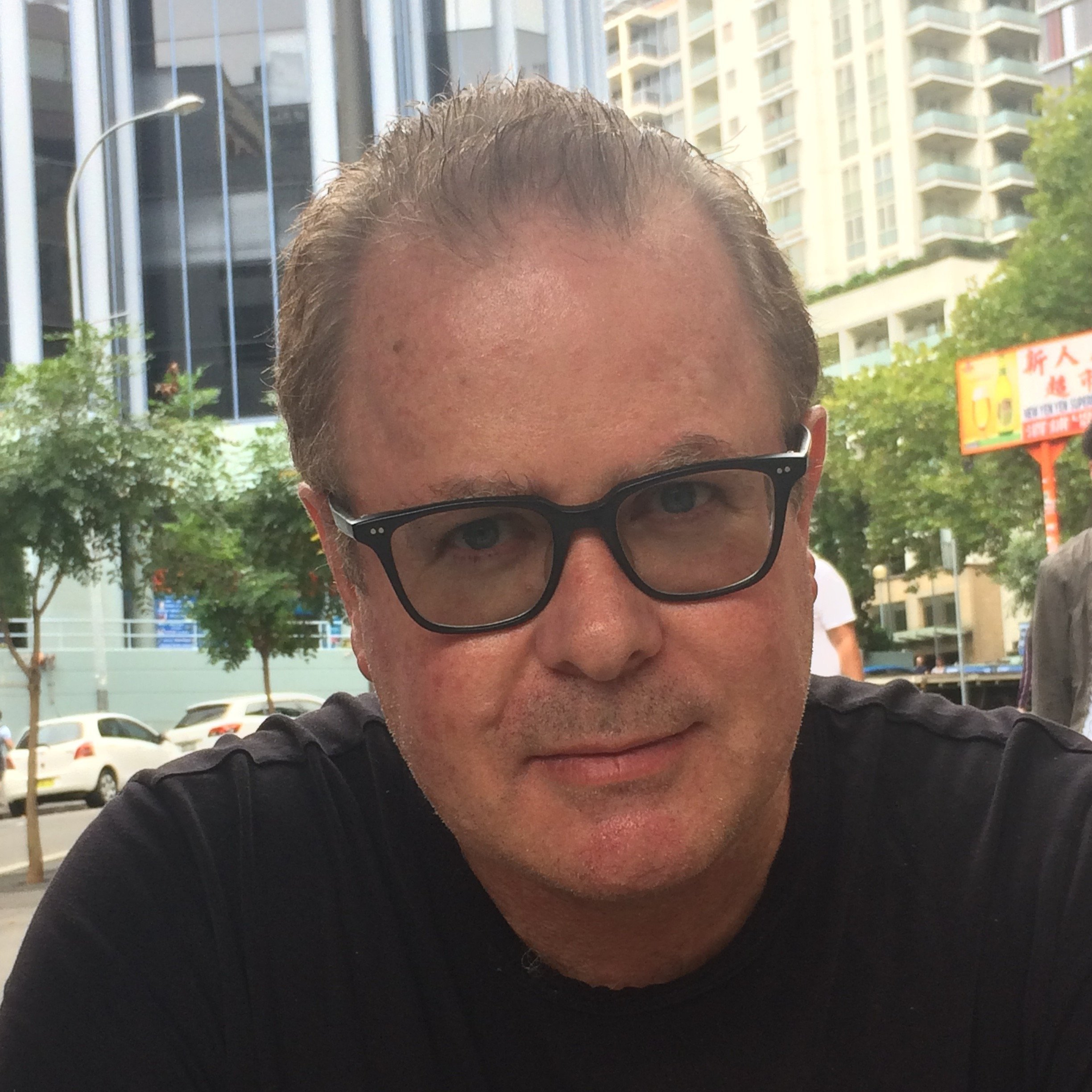

Education
- Education: Harvard University (PhD), University of Sydney (BA, 1st-class Hons)
- Thesis: Skeptical Reason and Inner Experience: A Re-examination of the Problem of the External World (1999)
- Doctoral advisor: Stanley Cavell, Hilary Putnam, Warren Goldfarb

Philosophical work
- Era: 21st-century philosophy
- Region: Western philosophy
- School: Analytic (training), Postanalytic Philosophy, Pragmatism, Skepticism
- Institutions: University of Sydney
- Main interests: skepticism, metaphysical quietism, pragmatism, naturalism, philosophy of art
- Notable ideas: metaphysical quietism, liberal naturalism, an imaginative relational view of art

David Macarthur is an Australian philosopher and Professor of Philosophy at the University of Sydney who works primarily on skepticism, metaphysical quietism, pragmatism, liberal naturalism and philosophy of art (especially film, photography and architecture). He has taken up these and other themes in articles on the philosophy of Stanley Cavell, John McDowell, Hilary Putnam, Richard Rorty and Ludwig Wittgenstein.

After completing a medical degree (M.B.B.S., 1988) and B.A. (1991, awarded with 1st-class Hons and University Medal) at the University of Sydney, he earned a Ph.D. in philosophy from Harvard University in 1999 under the supervision of Stanley Cavell, Hilary Putnam and Warren Goldfarb, with a thesis "Skeptical Reason & Inner Experience: A Re-Examination of the Problem of the External World." He then taught at Tufts University (1999–2000), before taking up a post-doctoral research fellowship at Macquarie University (2000–2003). Since 2003 he has been a member of the Philosophy Department at the University of Sydney.

Together with Mario De Caro, Macarthur has developed a new form of naturalism called liberal naturalism, as an alternative to scientific naturalism – which in one form or another is the orthodoxy within contemporary Anglo-American philosophy. Inspired primarily by Hilary Putnam, John McDowell, and Charles Taylor, liberal naturalism attempts to overcome the wholesale Sellarsian elimination or replacement of the manifest image by the scientific image of the world. In order to achieve this aim, Macarthur defends a metaphysically quietist version of liberal naturalism which affirms the viability and importance of non-scientific non-supernatural forms of understanding, especially concerning persons, language, art, artefacts and their various relations to one another.

In the philosophy of art, Macarthur argues against the view that artworks have a fixed and unique meaning or message. He defends an imaginative relational view of art according to which art is meaningful without a meaning. On this view art does not assert or preach; art intimates.

== Books ==
=== Edited volumes ===
- Macarthur, David and De Caro, Mario (Eds.) (2022). The Routledge Handbook of Liberal Naturalism. London: Routledge.
- Macarthur, David and Hetherington, Stephen (Eds.) (2022). Living Skepticism. Leiden: Brill.
- Macarthur, David and De Caro, Mario (Eds.) (2022). Philosophy as Dialogue: Hilary Putnam. Cambridge, MA: Harvard University Press.
- Macarthur, David (Ed.) (2017). Hilary Putnam & Ruth Anna Putnam, Pragmatism as a Way of Life: The Lasting Legacy of William James and John Dewey. Cambridge, MA: Harvard University Press.
- Macarthur, David and De Caro, Mario (Eds.) (2012). Hilary Putnam: Philosophy in an Age of Science: Physics, Mathematics and Skepticism. Cambridge, MA: Harvard University Press.
- Macarthur, David and De Caro, Mario (Eds.) (2010). Naturalism and Normativity. New York: Columbia University Press.
- Macarthur, David and De Caro, Mario (Eds.) (2004). Naturalism in Question. Cambridge, MA: Harvard University Press.

== Articles (selected) ==
- Macarthur, David (2020) “Rorty and (the End of) Metaphysics (?).” In The Blackwell Companion to Richard Rorty, Alan Malachawski (ed.). London: Wiley-Blackwell.
- Macarthur, David (2019) “Difficulties of Reality, Skepticism and Moral Community: Remarks after Diamond on Cavell.” In Andrew Gleeson & Craig Taylor (eds.) Philosophy in a Realistic Spirit. London: Routledge, 176-193.
- Macarthur, David (2017) “Wittgenstein on Art.” In Anat Matar (ed.) Understanding Wittgenstein, Understanding Modernism. London: Bloomsbury, 258–266.
- Macarthur, David (2017) “A Vision of Blindness: Bladerunner and Moral Redemption.” Film-Philosophy: Special Issue on Cinematic Ethics. Ed. Robert Sinnerbrink, vol. 21 no. 3: 371–391.
- Macarthur, David (2016) “Metaphysical Quietism and Everyday Life.” In G. D’Oro & S. Overgaard (eds.), The Cambridge Companion to Philosophical Methodology. Cambridge: Cambridge University Press, 270–296.
- Macarthur, David (2014) “Subject Naturalism, Scientism and the Problem of Linguistic Meaning: Critical Remarks on Price’s ‘Naturalism without Representationalism’.” Analisis (Spain), vol. 1 no. 1: 69–85.
- Macarthur, David (2014) “Cavell on Skepticism & the Importance of Not-Knowing”. Conversations: The Journal of Cavellian Studies, No. 2, (2014): 2–23, https://uottawa.scholarsportal.info/ojs/index.php/conversations/issue/view/222
- Macarthur, David (2010) “Taking the Human Sciences Seriously.” In De Caro, M. & Macarthur, D. (eds.), Naturalism and Normativity. New York: Columbia University Press, 123–141.
- Macarthur, David (2008) “Pragmatism, Metaphysical Quietism and the Problem of Normativity,” Philosophical Topics, vol. 36, no. 1: 193–207.
- Macarthur, David & Price, Huw (2007) “Pragmatism, Quasi-realism and the Global Challenge.” In C. Misak (ed.), New Pragmatists. Oxford: Oxford University Press.
- Macarthur, David (2003) “McDowell, Skepticism and the ‘Veil of Perception,” Australasian Journal of Philosophy, vol. 81: 175-190.
