= Victor Reppert =

American philosopher (born 1953)

Victor Reppert (born 1953) is an American philosopher best known for his development of the "argument from reason". He is the author of C.S. Lewis's Dangerous Idea (2003) and numerous academic papers in journals such as Christian Scholars' Review, International Journal for the Philosophy of Religion, Philo, and Philosophia Christi. He is also a philosophy blogger, with two blogs.

He holds a Ph.D. in philosophy (1989) from the University of Illinois Urbana-Champaign.

== The argument from reason ==
Reppert first became interested in the argument from reason after a conversion experience at the age of 18. He became aware that while unbelievers like Bertrand Russell claimed to be more rational than believers, Christians like C. S. Lewis argued not only that their belief is more rational than unbelief, but that the argument from reason shows that the very capacity to reason is itself a reason to think that the naturalism espoused by unbelievers is false. When he read G. E. M. Anscombe's critique of Lewis's argument, Reppert became persuaded that the argument could be formulated in such a way as to overcome Anscombe's objections. His paper "The Lewis-Anscombe Controversy: A Discussion of the Issues" was the result.

In 1998, Reppert posted his paper "The Argument from Reason" to the Secular Web. In 1999 a slightly revised version of the same paper appeared, with a response by Jim Lippard, in the humanist journal Philo. In the same issue, Keith M. Parsons, the then editor of Philo, presented some arguments against Reppert's conclusions in the course of a review of Thomas Nagel's The Last Word, so in 2000 Reppert wrote a "Reply to Parsons and Lippard", to which Parsons responded by writing the first full-dress attempt to refute Reppert's argument. Reppert's reply to Parsons was the paper "Causal Closure, Mechanism, and Rational Inference", which, since he felt it was time that more Christian philosophers were familiarized with the argument and related issues, appeared in 2001 in Philosophia Christi. In 2003 Philosophia Christi featured a "Symposium on the Argument from Reason", consisting of a paper by Reppert, responses by Theodore M. Drange, William Hasker and Keith Parsons, and a second paper by Reppert replying to these three critics.

Also in 2003, Reppert published his book C. S. Lewis's Dangerous Idea. The title alludes to Daniel Dennett's Darwin's Dangerous Idea, in which Dennett contrasted two types of explanation: one type is "mind-first" (that is to say, "in the last analysis ... purposeful and intentional"), whereas the other type "makes the explanation a feature of the system that in the last analysis is a product of the mindless system of physics and chemistry." For Dennett, Reppert observes, Darwin's dangerous idea is that the latter "are the only acceptable types of explanation", a position that "has become orthodoxy in such varied disciplines as evolutionary biology, cognitive science and artificial intelligence", as well as "in Anglo-American philosophy in general". C. S. Lewis's dangerous idea, by contrast, is that the attempt entirely to account for the world in such terms "overlooks something very important: the world thus analyzed has to have scientists in it. And scientists draw their conclusions from evidence, and in so doing they engage in rational inference.... Lewis's contention was that ... if you tried to account for the activity of reasoning as a byproduct of a fundamentally nonpurposive system, you end up describing something that cannot genuinely be called reasoning." In Darwin's Dangerous Idea, Dennett calls Darwin's idea "wonderful", "magnificent", and "the single best idea anyone has ever had", and says that his (Dennett's) admiration for it is "unbounded". Reppert observes that "If Darwin's dangerous idea is a true explanation of how Darwin got his dangerous idea, then the idea cannot possibly be the intellectual monument that Dennett supposes it to be."

C. S. Lewis's Dangerous Idea attracted a lot of response, including some comments by critics, most notably Richard C. Carrier, who on Internet Infidels called the book "surely the most extensive defense of the so-called 'Argument from Reason' yet to appear in print." Carrier's review "is about as long as the book itself", Reppert noted only half-jokingly, before going on to respond to some of Carrier's criticisms. Another response to Carrier's review came from Darek Barefoot, who, while he did not "find all of Reppert's arguments to be persuasive and all of Carrier's criticisms to be off-target", believed that the core of the argument from reason "is sound and that Reppert's book is a landmark contribution to the subject." Barefoot argued that Reppert had made a strong case for Lewis's claim "that the process of inference by which consideration of premises causes us to adopt a conclusion cannot be coherently conceived of in terms of physical cause-and-effect alone." Furthermore, if Reppert's version of the Argument from Reason "is successful, it reveals that rationality is fundamental to the universe, not simply a by-product of physical cause-and-effect; and this, in turn, is readily explicable on theism, but problematic for naturalism."

Jim Lippard, reporting a lecture by Daniel Dennett at Arizona State University in 2009, recounted that Dennett had coined the disparaging term "mind-creationists" for those who argue that original intentionality is an irreducible feature of the world. Lippard noted that the "mind-creationists" whom Dennett had in his sights included atheists like Thomas Nagel, John Searle and Jerry Fodor as well as believers like Victor Reppert.

== The Anscombe myth ==
In addition to explaining and expanding Lewis's theistic argument for God, Reppert has also made an important contribution to Lewis studies by deconstructing what he calls the "Anscombe myth". Roughly, the "Anscombe myth" arose, in part, from an actual encounter C. S. Lewis had at his Socratic Club with Catholic philosopher G. E. M. Anscombe over the soundness of the theistic argument he presents in his book Miracles. It has been alleged that Elizabeth Anscombe, in her presentation of the perceived problematic areas in Lewis's argument, had so thoroughly discredited his argument that Lewis sank into apologetic and theological obscurity. It has also been suggested that this friendly encounter led Lewis to not only reject the Argument from Reason, but also significantly question the validity of Christianity altogether. Reppert, in his critique of the "Anscombe myth", points out that Lewis merely revised his argument for later editions of Miracles, rather than rejecting it. Furthermore, Reppert notes that Lewis continued to proactively maintain the argument, as evidenced by the publication of several post-Anscombe-debate articles, chiefly in Christian Reflections and God in the Dock. Reppert also points out that Lewis's spiritual tenor in his later writings doesn't significantly differ in tone or substance from his earlier Christian material.

== Other work ==
Reppert has also done work criticising Hume, and, in particular, the Humean theories of miracles.

== Selected bibliography ==
- C. S. Lewis's Dangerous Idea: In Defence of the Argument from Reason. Downers Grove, Illinois: InterVarsity Press, 2003. ISBN 0-8308-2732-3
- "The Green Witch and the Great Debate: Freeing Narnia from the Spell of the Lewis-Anscombe Legend", in Gregory Bassham and Jerry L. Walls (eds), The Chronicles of Narnia and Philosophy: The Lion, the Witch and the Worldview. Chicago, Illinois: Open Court, 2005: 260–272. ISBN 0-8126-9588-7
- "Defending the Dangerous Idea: An Update on Lewis's Argument from Reason", in David Baggett, Gary R. Habermas and Jerry L. Walls (eds), C. S. Lewis as Philosopher: Truth, Goodness and Beauty. Downers Grove, Illinois: IVP Academic, 2008: 53–67. ISBN 0-8308-2808-7
- "Confronting Naturalism: The Argument from Reason", in Paul Copan and William Lane Craig (eds), Contending with Christianity's Critics: Answering New Atheists & Other Objectors. Nashville, Tennessee: B&H Academic, 2009: 26–46. ISBN 0-8054-4936-1
- "The Argument from Reason", in William Lane Craig and J.P. Moreland (eds), The Blackwell Companion to Natural Theology. West Sussex, UK: Wiley-Blackwell, 2012: 344–390. ISBN 1-4443-5085-4
