= Mario De Caro =

Italian philosopher (born 1963)

Mario De Caro (born 1963) is an Italian philosopher, professor of moral philosophy at the University of Rome III in Italy. Since 2000, he has also been teaching at Tufts University, where he is regularly a visiting professor. He is interested in moral philosophy, the free-will controversy, theory of action, history of science, Donald Davidson's and Hilary Putnam's philosophies, and early modern philosophy. With David Macarthur, he has defended a metaphilosophical view called liberal naturalism.

== Career ==
De Caro spent two years at MIT as a visiting graduate student and one as a Fulbright Fellow at Harvard University.

He is the editor of Interpretations and Causes: New Perspectives on Donald Davidson’s Philosophy, Naturalism in Question with David Macarthur, Cartographies of the Mind: Philosophy and Psychology in Intersection, Naturalism and Normativity (with David Macarthur), Philosophy in an Age of Science: Physics, Mathematics and Skepticism (with David Macarthur), and In Dialogue, two volumes of philosophical papers by Hilary Putnam by Harvard University Press.

He is associate editor of The Journal of the American Philosophical Association and Ancient Philosophy Today and a member of the editorial boards of The European Journal of Analytic Philosophy. He regularly contributes to the cultural pages of Il Sole 24 Ore and has written for the cultural sections of The Times, La Repubblica, and Il Manifesto. He is the vice president of the Consulta Nazionale di Filosofia (a grouping of Italian academic philosophers) and a former president of the Italian Society of Analytic Philosophy (2010–2012).

De Caro has given talks in numerous countries, at academic institutions such as Oxford, Harvard, Princeton, Dartmouth, Boston College, Notre Dame, Saint Mary's College (Indiana), Case Western Reserve (Ohio), Colby College, University of Massachusetts at Amherst, Paris IV-Sorbonne, Warwick, and Heidelberg, among others, as well as at over sixty Italian universities.

The asteroid 5329 Decaro is named in his honor.
