= Socratic Club =

Student debating society at Oxford University

The Oxford Socratic Club was a student club that met from 1942 to 1972 dedicated to providing an open forum for the discussion of the intellectual difficulties connected with religion, and with Christianity in particular.

The club was formed in December 1941, at Oxford University, by Stella Aldwinckle of the Oxford Pastorate and a group of undergraduate students. A student by the name of Monica Shorten had expressed a need for such a club. The society was to follow the practice of Socrates to "follow the argument wherever it led them." As all inter-college clubs at Oxford had to have a "senior member of the university" as a sponsor, Aldwinckle implored C. S. Lewis to be its first president. Lewis enthusiastically served as president from 1942 until he left for Cambridge in 1954. Basil Mitchell succeeded Lewis as president in February 1955. The first meeting was held on 26 January 1942, and the club disbanded in 1972.

The Oxford Socratic Club met on Monday evenings during term from 8.15 pm to 10.30 pm, with many undergraduates lingering long afterward. Many of the most notable figures of Oxford University presented or responded to papers, including G.E.M. Anscombe, Antony Flew, Iris Murdoch, Austin Farrer, A. J. Ayer, D.M. MacKinnon, C.E.M. Joad, E.L. Mascall, Gabriel Marcel, Frederick Copleston, I.M. Crombie, Basil Mitchell, R.M. Hare, Michael Polanyi, Gilbert Ryle, J.L. Austin, Dorothy Sayers.

Commenting on the Socratic Club at Oxford, C.S. Lewis stated, "In any fairly large and talkative community such as a university, there is always the danger that those who think alike should gravitate together into 'coteries' where they will henceforth encounter opposition only in the emasculated form of rumor that the outsiders say thus and thus. The absent are easily refuted, complacent dogmatism thrives, and differences of opinion are embittered by group hostility. Each group hears not the best, but the worst, that the other groups can say.”

== Famous debates ==
24 January 1944, C.E.M. Joad and C.S. Lewis, "On Being Reviewed by Christians."

This debate involved a presentation by Joad that was based on his recent book, published in November 1942, God and Evil, which contained his arguments for theism, but also against Christianity. Joad was at this time taking a closer look at Christianity because of the evil he saw in Nazi Germany. He cited Lewis many times in his book, which was undoubtedly one of the reasons he was invited to address the Socratic Club. Joad later became a Christian.

2 February 1948, Elizabeth Anscombe and C. S. Lewis, "The Self-Refuting Nature of Naturalism"

Catholic philosopher G.E.M. Anscombe debated Lewis about a portion of Lewis's 1947 book, Miracles, known today as the Argument from Reason, in which he stated that since naturalists claimed all of nature to be irrational, that would make the claim of the naturalists also irrational and therefore contrary to reason (for example, that if there is no God, if nature is the product of chance, then how can a human brain offer anything but chance observations that have no authority?). She claimed that he had mistakenly equated non-rational causes with irrational causes and confused the concepts of cause, reason, and explanation. John R. Lucas later helped in a rerun of this debate, which ended up vindicating Lewis. Victor Reppert's book, C.S. Lewis's Dangerous Idea, further supports Lewis's original argument.

== Meetings of the Socratic Club ==
1942
Can Science Render Religion Unnecessary? H. A. Hodges
1943
Science and Faith, Frank Sherwood Taylor;
Is the New Testament Reliable Evidence? Richard Kehoe
1944
On Being Reviewed by Christians, C. E. M. Joad;
Materialism and Agnosticism, J. K. White, Gordon Preston;
The Grounds of Modern Agnosticism, H. H. Price;
Has Psychology Debunked Sin? L. W. Grensted, Barbara Falk
1945
Marxist and Christian Views of the Nature of Man, Archibald Robertson, Emile Cammaerts
1946
Can Science Provide a Basis for Ethics? C. H. Waddington, Austin Farrer;
The Limits of Positivism, Friedrich Waismann
1947
Did the Resurrection Happen? R. E. Davies, T. M. Parker
1948
The Self-Refuting Nature of Naturalism, Elizabeth Anscombe, C. S. Lewis;
Rudolf Steiner and the Scientific Outlook, Alfred Heidenreich, Frank Sherwood Taylor;
Atheism, J. B. S. Haldane, Ian M. Crombie

Trinity Term, 1949

25 April Can Science Create Values? J. Bronowski, Basil Mitchell
2 May Some Remarks on Analysis, Personality, and Religion, G. J. C. Midgley
9 May Christianity, the Church, and the Churches, Oliver Tomkins, T. M. Parker
16 May Psychoanalysis and Religion, Anita Kohsen, R. S. Lee
30 May Value Judgments, R. M. Hare
6 June The Morality of Dangerous Devices, I. M. Crombie, N. J. P. Brown

Michaelmas Term, 1949

10 Oct Are Tautologies Really Necessary? P. J. Fitzgerald, C. S. Lewis
17 Oct Agreement and Disagreement in Ethics, A. C. Ewing, R. M. Hare
24 Oct Philosophy and Psychoanalysis, John Wisdom, Leycester King
31 Oct Some Displaced Questions, E. L. Mascall, A. G. N. Flew
7 Nov Hindu Speculation and Jung, Basil de Mel, Vernon Katz
21 Nov Can Science Be Creative? C. H. Waddington, Frank Sherwood-Taylor
28 Nov Physics and philosophy, Lord Cherwell, J. C. Stuart

Hilary Term, 1950

23 Jan The Nature of Faith, J. P. Hickinbotham, E. L. Mascall
6 Feb Certainty, L. A. Grint, C. D. Rollins
13 Feb Grounds for Disbelief in God, Archibald Robertson, C. S. Lewis
20 Feb Freudian Psychology and Christian Faith, B. A. Farrell, R. S. Lee
27 Feb The Relation of Psychical Research to the Scientific Method, N. M. Tyrell, L. W. Grensted
6 Mar Marxism, Douglas Hyde, V. A. Demant

Trinity Term, 1950

1 May Can We Trust the Gospels? D. E. Nineham, G. E. F. Chilver
8 May Biology and Theism, A. Rendle Short, A. C. Hardy
15 May Theology and Verification, A. G. N. Flew, Bernard Williams
22 May The Spirit of Religious Intolerance, Gervase Mathew, H. C. Carpenter
29 May Criteria in Ethical Judgment, G. E. Hughes, S. E. Tomlin
5 June Personalism, J. B. Coates

Michaelmas Term, 1950

16 Oct God and History, Michael Foster, C. S. Lewis
30 Oct Explanation: Scientific and Philosophical, David Mitchell, S. F. Mason
7 Nov Is Theology a Science? G. C. Stead, Austin Farrer
13 Nov Reason and Rationalism in Religion, R. S. Lee, A. P. d’Entreves

Hilary Term, 1951

22 Jan The Problem of Freedom, J. Ward-Smith
29 Jan On Clearing Up Philosophical Muddles, Bernard Williams
12 Feb Psychopathology and Sin, Seymore Spencer, Victor White
30 Apr The Philosophical Basis of Marxism, Marcus Wheeler, S. F. Mason

Michaelmas Term, 1951

22 Oct Appreciation of Linguistic Analysis, I. T. Ramsey
5 Nov Do the Mystics Know? Thomas Corbishley

Hilary Term, 1952

28 Jan Imago Dei and the Unconscious, Oswald Summer, R. W. Kosterlitz
4 Feb The Buddhist Approach to Philosophy, Auguste Purfurst, Basil Mitchell
25 Feb The Gospels—History or Myth? Christopher Evans, P. H. Nowell-Smith
3 Mar Rational Existentialism, E. L. Mascall, Iris Murdoch
10 Mar Cosmology and Theism, G. J. Whitrow, E. L. Mascall

Trinity Term, 1952

28 Apr The Notion of Development in Psychology and Its Bearing Upon Religion, R. S. Lee
5 May Creation Never Was, Michael Scriven
12 May Christianity and Humanism in Western Culture, Christopher Dawson, I.T. Ramsey
19 May What Is Theology? H. D. Lewis, J. J. Hartland-Swann
26 May Subjective and Objective Language, J. Z. Young, Gilbert Ryle
2 June The Stability of Beliefs, Michael Polanyi, C. T. W. Curle
9 June Guilt and Freedom, John Wisdom, J. L. Austin

Michaelmas Term, 1952

17 Oct Contemporary Philosophy and Christian Faith, Basil Mitchell
24 Oct The Logic of Personality, Bernard Mayo, R. M. Hare
3 Nov A Living Universe, D. E. Harding, C. S. Lewis
10 Nov A New Humanist Alternative to Christ and Mary, H. J. Blackham, Iris Murdoch
17 Nov The Ethic of Belief, Brand Blanshard, H. H. Price
24 Nov Topic Unknown, J. N. Findlay
1 Dec Soloviev and His Idea of Good and Evil, Nicholas Zernov, E. W. Lambert

1953

The Gospels: Myth or History? R. Creham, A. R. C. Leaney

1954

The Anatomy of Atheism, E. W. Lambert, John Lucas

== Other Socratic Clubs ==
Though the Oxford Socratic Club disbanded, several Socratic Clubs now exist in colleges and universities. Among these are Socratic Clubs in Utrecht, the Netherlands, Vanderbilt University, Oregon State University, the University of Gonzaga, Trinity Bible College, Samford University (founded in 2007) and the Queen's University of Belfast, in Northern Ireland.

As of 2007 there has been an Oxford University Socrates Society with similar aims to those of the Socratic Club.

The Queen's University of Belfast Socratic Club, founded in 2013, holds similar aims to that of the original at Oxford.

There are also branches of the society at West Buckland School in Devon, King Edward's School at Bath, and Prior Park College, where these branches are referred to as "The Socrates Club" and have the same aims as the original Oxford University "Socratic Society" of C.S. Lewis.

== See also ==
- Socrates – the Ancient Greek philosopher after whom the club was named.
- Socrates Cafe – an international network of gatherings of diverse people to engage in discussions via the Socratic method
- The Fourth K – a novel by Mario Puzo
