= Ruth Anna Putnam =

American philosopher (1927–2019)

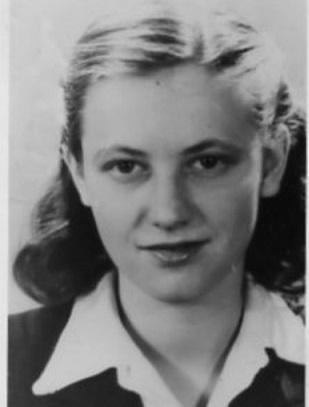
- Ruth Anna Putnam as a young girl
- Born: Ruth Anna Jacobs; 20 September 1927; Berlin, Germany
- Died: 4 May 2019 (aged 91); Arlington, Massachusetts, U.S.
- Other names: Ruth Anna Hall, Ruth Anna (Hall) Mathers
- Occupations: Philosopher and academic
- Spouse: Hilary Putnam

Ruth Anna Putnam (born Ruth Anna Jacobs; 20 September 1927 – 4 May 2019) was an American philosopher and Professor of Philosophy at Wellesley College.

== Biography ==
Ruth Anna Jacobs was born in Berlin on 20 September 1927.

Her father, born Karl Adolf Rudolf Hermann Jacobs in 1901 in Gotha, was Hermann Jacobs, the great great grandson of the German scholar Friedrich Jacobs. Her mother Marie Jacobs, born Marie Kohn in 1901, was the daughter of Hans Nathan Kohn, the German physician after whom the "Pores of Kohn" were named. Ruth was the couple's only child.

Ruth Jacob's parents were, respectively, Jewish and Christian by birth, but saw themselves as atheists. When she was five years old, she was sent to live with her Christian grandparents when her anti-Nazi parents went into hiding. Ruth Anna emigrated to the United States in 1948, aged 21, where she was finally reunited with her parents in Los Angeles.

Her father, having been a well-known Communist in Germany and thus fearful of deportation from the US, had changed his name to 'Martin Hall'. And Ruth went by this surname as a young adult though, as she would tell her family, she did not legally change her birth name before marriage.

She studied chemistry at UCLA, obtaining a B.S. degree in 1954. During her undergraduate studies she "fell in love with Philosophy of Science." And she would go on to gain a Ph.D. in philosophy at UCLA in 1962 with a dissertation on "The Interpretation of Theoretical Statements" written under the supervision of Rudolf Carnap.

After three years as Acting Assistant Professor in Philosophy at the University of Oregon, Ruth Anna moved to Wellesley College as a lecturer in 1963, and taught there until 1998, becoming Professor of Philosophy, and serving as chair of the Department of Philosophy in 1979–1982 and 1990–1993. In retirement she held the title of Professor Emerita.

Much of her work focused on the philosopher William James and she edited (and contributed to) The Cambridge Companion to William James (1997). She also worked on John Dewey. She married the philosopher Hilary Putnam on August 11, 1962. Both brought up by atheist parents, they decided to bring their children up as a Jewish family. Ruth had her bat mitzvah in 1998, saying that it sent the message that "We are not going to finish Hitler's work for him. We are not going to assimilate". At the time of Hilary's death, age 89, in 2016 they had two daughters, two sons and four granddaughters.

In 2017 a book collecting articles on pragmatism by both Ruth Anna and Hilary Putnam was published under the title Pragmatism as a Way of Life: The Lasting Legacy of William James and John Dewey. In its introduction, the volume's editor David Macarthur of the University of Sydney hailed her as "an internationally renowned interpreter of James's and Dewey's visions of pragmatism."

Ruth Putnam died at her home on 4 May 2019, aged 91 of complications from Parkinson's disease.

== Select bibliography ==
- Pragmatism as a Way of Life: The Lasting Legacy of William James and John Dewey, D. Macarthur (ed.), with Hilary Putnam, Harvard University Press, 2017, ISBN 9780674967502 LCCN 2016-43965
- (as editor) The Cambridge Companion to William James, Cambridge University Press, 1997, ISBN 9780521459068
- "Why Not a Feminist Theory of Justice?" in Women, Culture and Development, ed. Martha Nussbaum and Jonathan Glover (Oxford, 1995), pp. 298–331.

Full list of Articles/Reviews on PhilPapers
