= Miracles (book) =

Book written by C. S. Lewis

- First edition
- Author: C. S. Lewis
- Language: Englilsh
- Publisher: Geoffrey Bles
- Publication date: 1947

Miracles is a book written by C. S. Lewis, originally published in 1947 and revised in 1960. Lewis argues that before one can learn from the study of history whether or not any miracles have ever occurred, one must first settle the philosophical question of whether it is logically possible that miracles can occur in principle. He accuses modern historians and scientific thinkers, particularly secular biblical scholars, of begging the question against miracles, insisting that modern disbelief in miracles is a cultural bias thrust upon the historical record and is not derivable from it.

In a chapter on "The Naturalist and the Supernaturalist" Lewis gives technical definitions to the two terms. Naturalists, under his definition, believe that the Universe is a vast process in which all events which ever happen find their causes solely in the events that happened before them within the system. Supernaturalists believe that interruptions or interferences can take place in this system of our Universe from some other system outside it. In particular, a supernaturalist believes that the natural world was created or derived from a supernatural entity. A supernatural event would be one that is not traceable, even in principle, solely to materially determined causes within our Universe. Libertarian free will, if it exists, would have to be supernatural under this view.

In a chapter on "Natural Laws", Lewis addresses the issue of whether miracles are incompatible with natural law or science. He argues that rather than being mutually exclusive, miracles are definite interventions that go beyond natural laws. Miracles are consistent with nature, but beyond natural law.

Lewis makes a case for the reality of miracles by presenting the position that something more than nature, a supernatural world, may exist, including a benevolent creator likely to intervene in reality after creation.

All of the major miracles of the New Testament are addressed, with the incarnation playing the central role. Also included are two appendices which deal with matters of free will and the value of prayer.

== Argument from reason ==
Philosophers and scientists including Victor Reppert, William Hasker, and Alvin Plantinga have expanded on the "Argument from reason" and credit Lewis with first bringing the argument to light in Miracles.

The argument holds that if, as thoroughgoing naturalism entails, all of our thoughts are the effect of a physical cause, then there is no reason for assuming that they are also the consequent of a reasonable ground. Knowledge, however, is apprehended by reasoning from ground to consequent. Therefore, if naturalism were true, there would be no way of knowing it, or anything else not the direct result of a physical cause.

Lewis asserts that by this logic, the statement "I have reason to believe naturalism is valid" is self-referentially incoherent in the same manner as the sentence "One of the words of this sentence does not have the meaning that it appears to have", or the statement "I never tell the truth". In each case, to assume the veracity of the conclusion would eliminate the possibility of valid grounds from which to reach it. To summarize the argument in the book, Lewis quotes J. B. S. Haldane who appeals to a similar line of reasoning. Haldane states "If my mental processes are determined wholly by the motions of atoms in my brain, I have no reason to suppose that my beliefs are true ... and hence I have no reason for supposing my brain to be composed of atoms."

== Revisions ==
The original version of Miracles contained a different version of chapter 3 entitled "The Self-Contradiction of the Naturalist". In it, Lewis made the same argument but referred to atomic motions in the brain as "irrational". In a Socratic Club debate, Catholic analytical Thomist G. E. M. Anscombe criticized this, prompting Lewis to revise the chapter. The revised chapter presents a more detailed elucidation of the argument and distinguishes between "non-rational" and "irrational" processes. Anscombe commented on the process after Lewis's death that the rewrite showed "honesty and seriousness" on the part of Lewis.

== See also ==
- Evolutionary argument against naturalism
- Argument from reason
- Socratic Club
- The Anscombe Myth
