= Liberal naturalism =

Heterodox form of philosophical naturalism

Liberal naturalism is a heterodox form of philosophical naturalism that rejects both scientific (or reductive) naturalism and supernaturalism. It allows that one can respect the explanations and results of the successful sciences without supposing that the sciences are the only resource for understanding humanity and dealings with the world and each other.

== Overview ==
The term "liberal naturalism" was defined and popularized in 2004 by Mario De Caro & David Macarthur and, independently, by Gregg Rosenberg. This form of naturalism was later ascribed to Immanuel Kant. In De Caro's work, liberal naturalism is developed as a mild metaphysical realism; whereas in Macarthur's work liberal naturalism is associated with metaphysical quietism and opens into a philosophy of the manifest image.

For a liberal naturalist, many things in our everyday world that are not explicable (or not fully explicable) by science are, nonetheless, presupposed by science—e.g., tables, persons, artworks, institutions, rational norms and values. Explaining such things might require non-scientific, non-supernatural resources according to this form of naturalism. So, rather than tailoring their ontology to the posits of the successful sciences, as scientific naturalists do, liberal naturalists recognise the prima facie irreducible reality of everyday objects that are part of what Wilfrid Sellars called "the manifest image".

Liberal naturalism is a "liberal" or "catholic" naturalism for several reasons each of which contrasts with scientific naturalist orthodoxy:

1. It does not limit its ontological commitments to the explanatory posits of the successful sciences.
2. It acknowledges the existence of non-scientific modes of knowing and/or understanding such things as the value of artworks, the moral dimension of persons, and the relations between reasons of different kinds;
3. It allows for distinctively 1st-personal aspects of rational agency such as making up one's mind, taking responsibility for one's actions, and self-consciousness;
4. It attempts to provide a non-reductive, non-supernatural account of the rational or conceptual normativity to which people are responsive in theoretical and practical reasoning, e.g., by appeal to the Hegelian or pragmatist idea of mutual acknowledgement in a community;
5. It challenges the widely influential Quinean thesis that philosophy, when properly naturalized, must limit itself to the methods of the successful sciences.

== See also ==
- Emergentism
- History of naturalism
- Poetic naturalism
- Hylomorphism
