= Oxford Pastorate =

The Oxford Pastorate has provided chaplains to work alongside students in the University of Oxford, England, since it was founded in 1893 by evangelical Anglicans. Its objective is to encourage "true and lively faith" among Oxford's student population.

== Evangelicalism ==
British historian Mark Smith cites the Oxford Pastorate as an example of thriving evangelicalism in early 20th century England. He contends that the Pastorate's success was due to it differing markedly from the stereotypes often associated with evangelicalism: "Far from being negative, exclusive and oppositional, it represented an evangelicalism which, while definite about its own position, was positive, inclusive and constructive in its emphasis."

== Links with C. S. Lewis ==
In 1941, Oxford Pastorate chaplain Stella Aldwinckle founded the Oxford Socratic Club, whose first president was C. S. Lewis.

== New focus on postgraduates ==
Since its inception in 1893, the main focus of the Pastorate had been on working with undergraduates. In 2008, the Pastorate's trustees decided to focus the ministry on Oxford's rapidly growing postgraduate student community.

== Chaplains ==
Award-winning British author and theologian Jonathan Brant was retained in 2008 to serve as the new Graduate Pastorate Chaplain. He was initially assisted by two associate chaplains: Emilie Noteboom, and Christian Hofreiter, a Gosden graduate scholar in theology at Keble College.

In 2024 the Pastorate appointed Dr Bethan Willis to the role of Chaplain, the first woman to hold this position in 130 years of ministry.
