= Argument from consciousness =

Argument for the existence of God

The argument from consciousness is an argument for the existence of God that claims characteristics of human consciousness (such as qualia) cannot be explained by the physical mechanisms of the human body and brain, therefore asserting that there must be non-physical aspects to human consciousness. This is held as indirect evidence of God, given that notions about souls and the afterlife in Judaism, Christianity, and Islam would be consistent with such a claim.

The best-known defender of the argument from consciousness is J. P. Moreland.

== Philosophical summary of the argument ==
The argument may be stated in inductive or deductive form An alternative, closely related, version of the argument uses Platonism as its premise in a deductive argument.

=== Inductive form ===
Richard Swinburne put forward an inductive form of the argument in his book The Existence of God. He uses the argument from personal identity for mind-body dualism to show that we have a non-physical mental element to our minds. He suggests that the most probable way in which the non-physical and the physical are linked in causal-interaction is by design, which implies a designer. Swinburne suggests that this designer is God. He says that whilst this argument, owing to its inductive form, is inconclusive, it does provide strong evidence for a God.

=== Deductive form ===
1. Mental states are genuine nonphysical mental entities that exist.
2. Specific mental and physical event types are regularly correlated.
3. There is an explanation for these correlations.
4. Personal explanation is different from natural scientific explanation.
5. The explanation for these correlations is either a personal or natural scientific explanation.
6. The explanation is not a natural scientific one.
7. Therefore, the explanation is a personal one.
8. If the explanation is personal, then it is theistic.
9. Therefore, the explanation is theistic.

Theists such as Robert Adams have advanced a slightly different version of Swinburne's argument which focuses on mental/physical correlations and not merely the existence of mental states. These are similar to Swinburne's argument but take a deductive form rather than an inductive one.

William Lane Craig put the argument from consciousness as follows:

1. If God did not exist, intentional states of consciousness would not exist.
2. But intentional states of consciousness do exist.
3. Therefore, God exists.

Peter Kreeft has put forward a deductive form of the argument from consciousness based upon the intelligibility of the universe despite the limitations of our minds. He phrases it deductively as follows:

1. "We experience the universe as intelligible. This intelligibility means that the universe is graspable by intelligence."
2. "Either this intelligible universe and the finite minds so well suited to grasp it are the products of intelligence, or both intelligibility and intelligence are the products of blind chance."
3. "Not blind chance."
4. "Therefore this intelligible universe and the finite minds so well suited to grasp it are the products of intelligence."

He compares his argument to C. S. Lewis' argument from reason.

=== Platonic form ===
The Christian philosopher Augustine of Hippo formed a formulation of the argument from consciousness, sometimes termed the Argument from truth which is closely aligned to consciousness whilst using neither inductive nor deductive methodology. The argument was influenced by Platonism.

1. Our limited minds can discover eternal truths about being.
2. Truth properly resides in the mind.
3. But the human mind is not eternal.
4. Therefore, there must exist an eternal mind in which these truths reside.

The Catholic philosopher Peter Kreeft, whilst he feels that it could be an effective argument, feels that we have too little knowledge of the workings of consciousness for this to be truly convincing as of yet.

Another Catholic philosopher, Edward Feser has promoted the Augustinian argument, including it in his book Five Proofs of the Existence of God. He concludes that Augustine's argument is valid, having given many different reasons why Platonism, its primary premise, is true.

== Criticism ==
The first premise, assertion that non-physical mental states exist, implies a dualist view of mind. Therefore, one line of attack is to argue the case for physicalism about the human mind. Moreland takes the arguments for the first premise and refers to classic defenses of dualism. However, the first premise is rejected by many philosophers of mind. Frank Jackson, known for the knowledge argument in support of dualism about the mind, comments on the debate between physicalist and dualist conceptions of mind:

Much of the contemporary debate in the philosophy of mind is concerned with the clash between certain strongly held intuitions and what science tells us about the mind and its relation to the world. What science tells us about the mind points strongly towards some version or other of physicalism. The intuitions, in one way or another, suggest that there is something seriously incomplete about any purely physical story about the mind ... Most contemporary philosophers given a choice between going with science and going with intuitions, go with science. Although I once dissented from the majority, I have capitulated and now see the interesting issue as being where the arguments from the intuitions against physicalism—the arguments that seem so compelling—go wrong.

If one is willing to accept the first premise that reductive forms of physicalism are false, then the argument takes off. Thus, one could think of Moreland as making an argument that tries to move a person from "rejecting physicalism" to "accepting theism." The crucial step in this move is the fifth premise, which asserts that naturalism can not account for non-physical mental states. A critique of this premise is offered by Andrew Melnyk:

Naturalism can easily explain how the universe came to contain physically irreducible conscious occurrences. It can do so by supposing that, among the fundamental laws governing the universe, there are some according to which, whenever such-and-such complex nonconscious occurrences occur, so-and-so conscious occurrences occur; perhaps such a law says that, whenever a human brain attains a certain kind and degree of complexity, a pain is experienced. Given such laws, the capacity for consciousness that some creatures enjoy, like the capacity for breathing, can be explained as having arisen through natural selection. Through mutation, some creature was born with a brain of the requisite kind and degree of complexity to generate conscious experiences; and then, because these experiences increased the creature's fitness, such creatures were selected for.

However Moreland charges that such attempts to accommodate consciousness within an atheistic worldview are ad hoc and contrived and fail to take into account many features of conscious experience. Moreland spends much of the book defending this premise against philosophers, such as Michael Martin, who accept pluralist naturalism. He also critiques contemporary philosophers of mind such as John Searle, Timothy O' Connor, Colin McGinn, David Skriba, Philip Clayton and Jaegwon Kim, who attempt to account for consciousness.

Finally, one can also question premise eight: why does a personal explanation have to lead to monotheistic (as opposed to deistic or polytheistic) accounts of intention? However, Moreland maintains that questioning these minor premises is of little consolation to the naturalist as they essentially constitute intramural theist debates, and that for most westerners theism is the only viable candidate to accommodate personal explanations. Similarly Occam's razor can be applied so only one personal agent is required.
