= The Weight of Glory and Other Addresses =

Essay collection by C.S. Lewis

- Eerdmans paperback edition (1965)
- Author: C.S. Lewis
- Language: English
- Genre: Essay Collection
- Publication date: 1949

The Weight of Glory and Other Addresses is a collection of essays and addresses on Christianity by C.S. Lewis. It was first published as a single transcribed sermon, "The Weight of Glory" in 1941, appearing in the British journal, Theology, then in pamphlet form in 1942 by Society for Promoting Christian Knowledge, London. It was published in book form in 1949, as a compilation of five addresses, in London by Geoffrey Bles under the title Transposition and Other Addresses and in the U.S. by The MacMillan Company under the title The Weight of Glory and Other Addresses. A revised and expanded edition featuring four additional essays and an Introduction by Walter Hooper was published by Macmillan Publishers in 1980.

== Chapter list and descriptions for 1980 edition ==
- Introduction by Walter Hooper, Editor.
- Preface to the original 1949 edition by C. S. Lewis: "This book contains a selection of the too numerous addresses which I was induced to give during the late war and the years that immediately followed it."
1. "The Weight of Glory" - First given at Oxford University Church of St Mary the Virgin, 8 June 1941.
2. "Learning in War-Time" - Given at Oxford University Church of St. Mary the Virgin, 22 October 1939.
3. "Why I Am Not a Pacifist" - Talk, "given to a pacifist society at Oxford sometime in 1940", from the Introduction.
4. "Transposition" - Given in the Chapel of Mansfield College, Oxford, 28 May 1944.
5. "Is Theology Poetry?" - Presented to the Oxford University Socratic Club, 6 November 1944.
6. "The Inner Ring" - This was the "Commemoration Oration" given at King's College, University of London, 14 December 1944.
7. "Membership" - Read to the Society of St. Alban and St. Sergius, Oxford, 10 February 1945.
8. "On Forgiveness" - Written for Father Patrick Kevin Irwin (1907–1965) and sent to him, 28 August 1947. First published in Fern-seed and Elephants and Other Essays on Christianity by C. S. Lewis (1975).
9. "A Slip of the Tongue" - Given at the Chapel of Magdalene College, Cambridge, 29 January 1956. This was the last sermon preached by Lewis.

== Major themes ==
In his Introduction to the work, Walter Hooper notes that he has arranged the addresses chronologically except for "The Weight of Glory," which Hooper considered "so magnificent that . . . I dare to consider it worthy of a place with some of the Church Fathers." In that famous sermon Lewis explores the Christian concept of heavenly glory and argues that it consists of two qualities: (1) a welcoming acceptance and acknowledgment by God ("Well done, thou good and faithful servant") and (2) a brightness or luminosity of the glorified bodies of the saved. The "weight" or burden of glory, according to Lewis, consists in the realization that the redeemed shall be approved by God and "delighted in as an artist delights in his work or a father in a son."

The work is also notable for its critique of Christian pacifism, its defense of learning as a Christian vocation, its attack on materialistic reductionism, and its brief presentations of two of Lewis's most famous apologetical arguments, the argument from desire and the argument from reason.
