= Philo (journal) =

- Discipline: Philosophy
- Language: English
- Edited by: David Koepsell

Publication details
- History: 1998–2014
- Publisher: Center for Inquiry (United States)
- Frequency: Semiannual

Standard abbreviations
- ISO 4: Philo

Indexing
- ISSN: 1098-3570 (print); 2154-1639 (web)
- LCCN: sn98001862
- OCLC no.: 38569156

Links
- Journal homepage; Online access

Philo was a peer-reviewed academic journal published by the Society of Humanist Philosophers from 1998 to 2014. While it has now ceased publication, it was published at the Center for Inquiry with assistance from Purdue University. It focused on the discussion of philosophical issues from an explicitly naturalist perspective. The journal published articles, critical discussions, review essays, and book reviews in all fields of philosophy, and particularly invited work on the philosophical credentials of both naturalism and various supernaturalist alternatives to naturalism. Electronic access to the journal is provided by the Philosophy Documentation Center.

== See also ==
- List of philosophy journals
