= Dysteleology =

Philosophical view that existence has no final goal

Dysteleology is the philosophical view that existence has no supernatural telos – no final cause from purposeful design; it is the opposite of teleology.

Ernst Haeckel (1834–1919) invented and popularized the term dysteleology (German: Dysteleologie).

== See also ==
- Adevism
- Argument from poor design
- Epistemology
- Existential nihilism
- Faith and rationality
- Kierkegaard
- Materialism
- Meaning of life
- Nietzsche
- Philosophy of religion
- Teleological argument
- Teleology
- Teleonomy
