= William Hasker =

American philosopher

R. William Hasker (/ˈhæskər/; born 1935) is an American philosopher who is Distinguished Professor Emeritus of Philosophy at Huntington University. For many years, he was editor of Faith and Philosophy and has published many journal articles and books dealing with issues such as the mind–body problem, theodicy, and divine omniscience.

== Education ==
Hasker received his PhD in theology and philosophy of religion from the University of Edinburgh.

== Emergent dualism ==
Hasker has argued for open theism and a view known as emergent dualism regarding the nature of the human person. Hasker regards the soul as an "emergent" substance, dependent upon the body for its existence. Emergent dualism is a type of substance dualism which argues that the soul develops "naturally from the structure and functioning of the organism".

Hasker's emergent dualism rejects cartesian dualism, property dualism, and physicalism. He argues that emergent dualism supports free will, mental causation, rationality and survival of physical death and is compatible with neuroscientific discoveries showing the dependence of mind on brain and evolutionary theory. Emergent dualism states that in the course of evolutionary development an individual mind as an immaterial substance emerges from the brain. He likens the individual mind to a magnetic field in its qualitative difference from the physical properties that generate it and also in its ability to act on the brain that generates it. Hasker disagrees with the traditional dualist view that the mind exists independently of the body as he holds the view that it is generated by matter. He defends survival of death on the ground that God's mind produces another body to sustain it.

His 1999 publication The Emergent Self discusses the philosophy of mind and attempts to establish that mind cannot be solely a material process but is also not completely distinct from its physical basis in the brain.

Emergent dualism has been criticized by other substance dualist philosophers including Frank B. Dilley and Stewart Goetz.

== Selected publications ==
Hasker has published numerous works. A selection:

- 1983, Metaphysics: Constructing a World View (InterVarsity Press)
- 1989, God, Time, and Knowledge
- 1999, The Emergent Self (Cornell University Press)
- 2004, Providence, Evil, and the Openness of God
- 2008, The Triumph of God over Evil: Theodicy for a World of Suffering (IVP Academic)
- 2013, Metaphysics and the Tri-Personal God. Oxford Studies in Analytic Theology. (Oxford University Press)
