= Hermeneutic circle =

Iterative process of understanding a text and its context

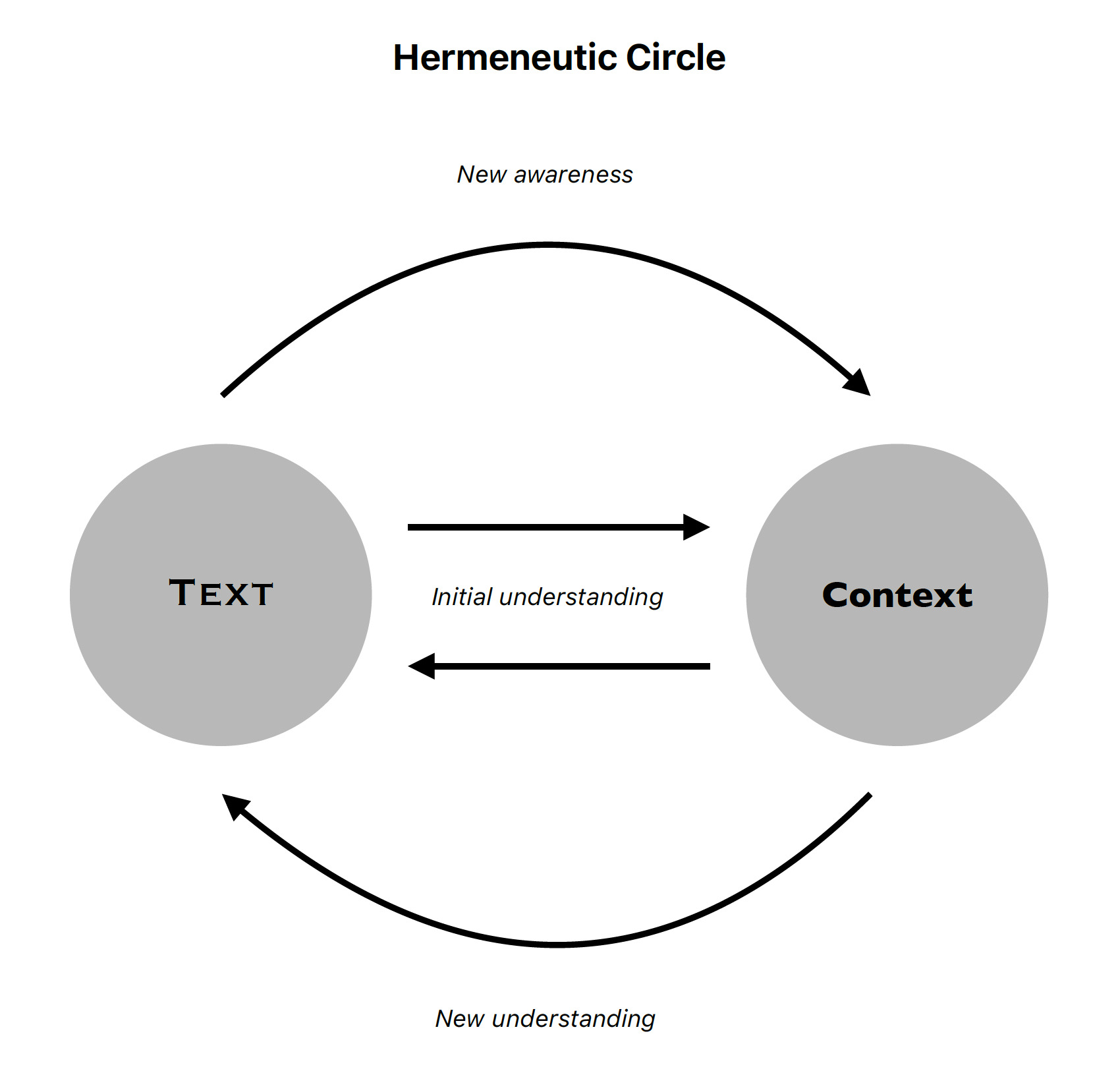
Hermeneutic circle

In hermeneutics, the hermeneutic circle (German: hermeneutischer Zirkel) is an iterative process of understanding a text (or an element of a text) through its context. It expresses the idea that interpretations of a part and the whole are mutually interdependent: an understanding of the whole is reached by reference to the individual parts, but an understanding of each individual part depends on an understanding of the whole. The circle is a metaphor for the procedure of transforming one's understanding of the part and the whole through iterative recontextualization.

== History ==
St. Augustine of Hippo was the first philosopher and theologian to have introduced the hermeneutic cycle of faith and reason (in Latin: credo ut intellegam and intellego ut credam). The circle was conceived to improve the Biblical exegesis and it was activated by the personal belief in the truthfulness of God. According to the Confessions, misleading verses of the Bible shall be read at the light of the Holy Spirit God and in the context of "the spirit of the Bible as a whole", intended as a unique and non-contradictory text divinely inspired.

Friedrich Schleiermacher's approach to interpretation focuses on the importance of the interpreter understanding the text as a necessary stage to interpreting it with repeated circular movements between the parts and the whole. Hence the idea of an hermeneutic circle. Even reading a sentence involves these repeated circular movements through a hierarchy of parts–whole relationships. Thus, as people read a sentence, they are analysing single words as the text unfolds, but are also weighing the meaning of each word against their changing understanding of the overall meaning of the sentence. Perhaps they are misunderstanding, or being reminded of, or clashing with, another view about interpretation they have advocated for or disparaged. Hence, they are brought to the sentence's larger historical context, depending on its location, and our own circumstances.

Wilhelm Dilthey used the example of understanding a sentence as an example of the circular course of hermeneutic understanding. He particularly stressed that meaning and meaningfulness were always contextual. Thus the meaning of any sentence cannot be fully interpreted unless we know the historical circumstances of its utterance. And this means that interpretation is always linked to the situation of the interpreter, because one can only construct a history from the particular set of circumstances in which one currently exists. Thus Dilthey says: "Meaningfulness fundamentally grows out of a relation of part to whole that is grounded in the nature of living experience." For Dilthey, "Meaning is not subjective; it is not projection of thought or thinking onto the object; it is a perception of a real relationship within a nexus prior to the subject-object separation in thought."

Martin Heidegger (1927) developed the concept of the hermeneutic circle to envision a whole in terms of a reality that was situated in the detailed experience of everyday existence by an individual (the parts). So understanding was developed on the basis of "fore-structures" of understanding, that allow external phenomena to be interpreted in a preliminary way.

Another instance of Heidegger's use of the hermeneutic circle occurs in his examination of The Origin of the Work of Art (1935–1936). Here Heidegger argues that both artists and art works can only be understood with reference to each other, and that neither can be understood apart from 'art,' which, as well, cannot be understood apart from the former two. The 'origin' of the work of art is mysterious and elusive, seemingly defying logic: "thus we are compelled to follow the circle. This is neither a makeshift or a defect. To enter upon the path is the strength of thought, to continue on it is the feast of thought, assuming thinking is a craft. Not only is the main step from work to art a circle like the step from art to work, but every separate step that we attempt circles this circle. In order to discover the nature of the art that really prevails in the work, let us go to the actual work and ask the work what and how it is."

Heidegger continues, saying that a work of art is not a simple thing (as a doorknob or a shoe is, which do not normally involve aesthetic experience), but it cannot escape its "thingly character," that is, being part of the larger order of things in the world, apart from all aesthetic experience. The synthesis of thingly and artistic is found in the work's allegorical and symbolic character, "but this one element in a work that manifests another, this one element that joins another, is the thingly feature in the art work". At this point, however, Heidegger raises the doubt of "whether the work is at bottom something else and not a thing at all." Later he tries to break down the metaphysical opposition between form and matter, and the whole other set of dualisms which include: rational and irrational, logical and illogical/alogical, and subject and object. Neither of these concepts is independent of the other, yet neither can be reduced to the other: Heidegger suggests we have to look beyond both.

Hans-Georg Gadamer (1975) further developed this concept, leading to what is recognized as a break with previous hermeneutic traditions. While Heidegger saw the hermeneutic process as cycles of self-reference that situated our understanding in a priori prejudices, Gadamer reconceptualized the hermeneutic circle as an iterative process through which a new understanding of a whole reality is developed by means of exploring the detail of existence. Gadamer viewed understanding as linguistically mediated, through conversations with others in which reality is explored and an agreement is reached that represents a new understanding. The centrality of conversation to the hermeneutic circle is developed by Donald Schön, who characterizes design as a hermeneutic circle that is developed by means of "a conversation with the situation."

Paul de Man, in his essay "Form and Intent in the American New Criticism," talks about the hermeneutic circle with reference to paradoxical ideas about "textual unity" espoused by and inherited from American criticism. De Man points out that the "textual unity" New Criticism locates in a given work has only a "semi-circularity" and that the hermeneutic circle is completed in "the act of interpreting the text." Combining Gadamer and Heidegger into an epistemological critique of interpretation and reading, de Man argues that with New Criticism, American Criticism "pragmatically entered" the hermeneutic circle, "mistaking it for the organic circularity of natural processes."

== Critique ==
Judith N. Shklar (1986) points out the ambiguity in the meaning and function of the "circle" as a metaphor for understanding. It is taken to refer to a geometric circle, rather than a circular process, it seems to imply a center, but it is unclear whether the interpreter him/herself stands there, or whether, on the contrary, some "organizing principle and illuminating principle apart from him [is] there waiting to be discovered." Furthermore, and more problematic for Shklar, "the hermeneutic circle makes sense only if there is a known and closed whole, which can be understood in terms of its own parts and which has as its core God, who is its anchor and creator. Only the Bible really meets these conditions. It is the only possibly wholly self-sufficient text." A further problem relates to the fact that Gadamer and others assume a fixed role for tradition (individual and disciplinary/academic) in the process of any hermeneutic understanding, while it is more accurate to say that interpreters have multiple and sometimes conflicting cultural attachments, yet this does not prevent intercultural and/or interdisciplinary dialogue. Finally, she warns that, at least in social science, interpretation is not a substitute for explanation.

Heidegger (1935–1936) and Schockel (1998) respond to critics of this model of interpretation who allege it is a case of invalid reasoning by asserting that any form of reflection or interpretation must oscillate between particular and general, part and whole. It does not 'beg the question' because it is a different approach than formal logic. While it does imply presuppositions, it does not take any premise for granted. Schokel suggests a spiral as a better metaphor for interpretation, but admits that Schleiermacher's influence may have 'acclimatized' the term.

== See also ==
- Critical reading
- G. A. F. Ast
- Experiential learning
