= Fides quaerens intellectum =

Philosophical phrase

Fides quaerens intellectum, means "faith seeking understanding" or "faith seeking intelligence", is a Latin sentence by Anselm of Canterbury, which had been the first title for his Proslogion (I). It articulates the close relationship between faith and human reason.

Anselm states: "Neque enim quaero intelligere ut credam, sed credo ut intelligam" ("I do not seek to understand in order that I may believe, but rather, I believe in order that I may understand").

The sentence represents the theological method stressed by Augustine (354–430) and Anselm of Canterbury (c. 1033 – 1109), in which one begins with faith in God and on the basis of that faith moves on to further understanding of Christian truth or faith: intellectus fidei.

== See also ==
- Credo ut intelligam
- Fides et ratio
- Rational fideism
- Science and the Catholic Church
