= Catholic University of Cameroon, Bamenda =

University in Cameroon

Catholic University of Cameroon, (CATUC) Bamenda
- Other name: City of Wisdom
- Motto: Fides et Ratio
- Motto in English: Faith and Reason
- Type: Private
- Established: April 10, 2010; 16 years ago
- Religious affiliation: Catholic Church
- Chancellor: Most Rev. Cornelius Fontem Esua
- Vice-Chancellor: Rev. Fr. Michael Suh Niba
- Location: P.O. Box 782, Bamenda, Cameroon; 5.9496°N 10.1561°E
- Campus: Urban
- Website: www.catuc.org

The Catholic University of Cameroon (CATUC), or in Latin (Universitas Catholica Cameruniae) is a private university located in Bamenda in the North West region of the Republic of Cameroon. It is the Provincial University of the Catholic Church in the Anglophone part of Cameroon and the only Catholic Institution of Higher Education founded by the Anglophone Catholic Bishops of the Ecclesiastical Province of Bamenda. It provides undergraduate, graduate and professional studies in both the arts and the sciences.

The faculties and schools are spread across the dioceses of Bamenda Ecclesiastical Province, with the main campus located in Bamenda. While the main campus is being developed, the university is operating at the Saint Joseph’s Catholic Cathedral Primary School.

Professors and Lecturers at the University are recruited from sacred (i.e., theology, canon law, etc.) and secular disciplines (e.g., letters, philosophy, education, social sciences, economics). The majority of degrees and diplomas awarded by the Catholic University of Cameroon, Bamenda are state-authorized diplomas, as the university is certified to issue them by the Ministry of Higher Education. Theological degrees are awarded in the name of the Holy See and are the result of a prescribed course of study in the ecclesiastical faculty of theology.
