= Dehellenization =

Dehellenization may refer to:

- The reverse of the process in which Greek culture, religion, and language is adopted, known as Hellenization
- Dehellenization of Christianity, a question within modern Catholic discourse as to whether Christianity should be divorced from its roots in ancient Greek philosophy
