= Stoicism and Christianity =

Stoicism and Christianity may refer to:

- Christianity and Hellenistic philosophy
- Neostoicism
- Stoicism § Christianity
- Christianity and paganism § Influence on early Christian theology
