= Bear Creek High School =

Bear Creek High School may refer to:

- Bear Creek High School (California), an American public high school in Stockton, California
- Bear Creek High School (Colorado), an American public high school in Lakewood, Colorado
- The Bear Creek School, an American private kindergarten through twelfth grade school in Redmond, Washington
