= Leonella Sgorbati =

Italian religious sister (1940–2006)

Blessed Leonella Sgorbati IMC

Virgin martyr
- Born: Rosa Maria Sgorbati; 9 December 1940; Gazzola, Piacenza, Kingdom of Italy
- Died: 17 September 2006 (aged 65); Mogadishu, Somalia
- Venerated in: Roman Catholic Church
- Beatified: 26 May 2018, Cattedrale di Santa Maria Assunta e Santa Giustina, Piacenza, Italy by Cardinal Angelo Amato
- Feast: 17 September

Leonella Sgorbati, born Rosa Maria Sgorbati, (9 December 1940 – 17 September 2006) was an Italian religious sister of the Consolata Missionaries who served in the missions in both Kenya and in Somalia. She was murdered in Somalia not long after the Regensburg lecture of Pope Benedict XVI and after having worked on the continent for over three decades. Her main attention was on nursing and educating prospective nurses while she also tended to the needs of children in a children's hospital that she frequented.

In 2008 her cross was deposited in the San Bartolomeo all'Isola church. She was beatified on 26 May 2018 in Piacenza.

== Life ==
Rosa Maria Sgorbati was born on 9 December 1940 in Gazzola near Piacenza as the last of three children to Carlo Sgorbati and Giovannina (called Teresa) Vigilini. Her baptism was celebrated moments after her birth in the San Savino parish church. The Sgorbati family later relocated to Milan on 9 October 1950 for her father to find work; he died on 16 July 1951.

In her teens, she desired to become a religious sister working in the missions, though (at age sixteen when she announced it) her mother did not approve of this choice and asked that she wait until she turned 20. At time, she joined the Consolata Missionary Sisters in San Fre in Cuneo on 5 May 1963, began her postulancy on 20 May, and her novitiate on 21 November 1963 in Nepi and took the religious name Leonella. She made her initial profession of vows on 22 November 1965 and her perpetual profession in November 1972.

=== African mission ===
Sgorbati underwent a nursing course in England from 1966 until 1968 before being sent in September 1970 to Kenya. From 1970 until 1983 she served at the Consolata Hospital Mathari in Nyeri and at the Nazareth Hospital in Kiambu on the outskirts of Nairobi acting as a midwife for a time. In mid-1983 she started her advanced studies in nursing and in 1985 became the principal tutor at the school of nursing attached to Nkubu Hospital in Meru. In November 1993 she was elected as the regional superior of the order in Kenya and retained the position until 1999. She took a sabbatical in 2000 and then in 2001 spent several months in Mogadishu in Somalia looking at the potential for a new nursing school in the hospital that the SOS Children's Village managed. The "Hermann Gmeiner School of Registered Community Nursing" opened in 2002 with Sgorbati in charge of it. The first 34 nurses graduated from the school in 2002 with the World Health Organization awarding them with certificates and diplomas since Somalia had no government after 1991. At that stage, Sgorbati spoke Somali fluently.

She was also keen to train tutors for the nursing school and so returned to Kenya with three of her now-graduated nurses in order to register them for further training at a medical training college. But Sgorbati faced difficulties in obtaining her own re-entry visa to Mogadishu due to the new rules of the Islamic courts that now controlled the town and its environs. She did manage to return to Mogadishu on 13 September 2006 after having vacationed in her homeland that February.

=== Murder ===
On 17 September 2006 Sgorbati was gunned down outside her children's hospital just after 12:30 pm when she finished teaching and was crossing the road to go to the monastery, where three other sisters were waiting to have lunch with her. Her guard and driver Mohamed Osman Mahamud (a father of four) was also killed.

The attack was believed to be in response to the controversial comments that Pope Benedict XVI had made in his Regensburg lecture. Several humanitarian workers and Christian volunteers were slain around this time. Two gunmen emerged from taxis and kiosks and shot her in the back three or four times after the first bullet hit her thigh. Her guard shielded her and was struck down after opening fire with the attackers. One bullet had entered her back and severed an artery which caused a severe and instant hemorrhage. Sgorbati was rushed to the SOS Hospital but later died there on the operating table. Her final words were "I forgive; I forgive; I forgive" which she whispered to Sr. Marzia Feurra. It was at 3 pm that a plane came to take her remains to Nairobi where it arrived at 9 pm; her remains were taken to the Lee Funeral Home.

The morning she died she was upset at the backlash that the pope had received from his address in Regensburg. She went out in the morning to the nursing school and at the end of her lessons in the afternoon smiled at her guard and driver who waited for her outside. The distance across the road was nine meters but the pair made it around five or so meters when the attack occurred. En route to the hospital she was pale and feverish with transfusions being made as she sweated from the pain and blood loss. In the ambulance van, she remarked to Sisters Gianna Irene Peano and Marzia that she was "struggling to breathe".

Somalian officials vowed justice for the nun's murder with two suspects arrested and Somalia's Islamic Courts Union launching their own investigations into the murder (the motive is still unknown); Yusuf Mohamed Siad of the UIC said that two suspects were arrested. Federico Lombardi said that the killing was a "horrible act" which he hoped would remain an isolated case and would not become something widespread in the region. The papal nuncio Alain Paul Charles Lebeaupin said that it was unclear whether or not her death could be attributed to religious extremism.

=== Funeral and exhumation ===
The funeral was celebrated on 21 September in the Consolata Chapel in Nairobi with the Bishop of Djibouti Giorgio Bertin presiding. The Italian ambassador to Kenya was present as was the Kenyan United Nations representative. In his remarks Bertin said that she stressed a message of love and togetherness adding that "together life is possible". Her colleague at the mission in Kenya (Sr. Rose) remarked at her funeral that "she was ever so generous" to all she met and worked alongside. Her remains were buried in Nairobi and later exhumed for canonical inspection on 30 September 2017 before being placed in a chapel in Nairobi (Flora Hostel Chapel) and then buried in December there.

=== Recognition ===
Pope Benedict XVI referred to the slain sister as a "servant of love" in his speech after the Angelus prayer to 3000 people at Castel Gandolfo.

On 13 October 2008 a Mass was celebrated for the occasion of the cross that she wore being transferred to the San Bartolomeo all'Isola church in Rome. Pope Francis venerated her cross relic on his visit to the church on 22 April 2017.

== Beatification ==
The diocesan process was held in Mogadishu from its inauguration on 16 October 2013 until its solemn closure not long after on 15 January 2014. The Congregation for the Causes of Saints validated this diocesan investigation on 19 September 2014. Pope Francis confirmed on 8 November 2017 that Sgorbati was killed in odium fidei ("in hatred of the faith").

The beatification took place on 26 May 2018 in Piacenza with Cardinal Angelo Amato presiding over the celebration on the behalf of the pope. The Archbishop of Milan Mario Enrico Delpini was also in attendance as was the Bishop of Piacenza-Bobbio Gianni Ambrosio. The postulator for this cause is the Renata Conti MC.
