= Roger Arnaldez =

French professor of Islamic studies

Roger Arnaldez (13 September 1911 – 7 April 2006, aged 94) was a French professor of Islamic studies born in Paris, and also a publisher of Philo.

Arnaldez was elected a member of the Académie des sciences morales et politiques 10 February 1986 and présided the Académie in 1997. He is also associate member of the Royal Academy of Science, Letters and Fine Arts of Belgium and corresponding member of the Cairo Academy of Arabic Language.

He was quoted by Pope Benedict XVI in his famous speech which led to the Regensburg controversy.

Roger Arnaldez was also interested in an English author, Gilbert K. Chesterton (29 May 1874 – 14 June 1936), to whom he devoted a book.

== Works ==
- 1956: Grammaire et théologie chez Ibn Hazm de Cordoue (Vrin)
- 1963: Hallâj ou la religion de la croix (Plon, "La recherche de l'absolu")
- 1970: Mahomet (Seghers)
- 1980: Jésus, fils de Marie, prophète de l'Islam (Desclée de Brouwer)
- 1983: Le Coran (Desclée)
- 1988: L'Islam (Desclée-Novalis)
- 1988: Jésus dans la pensée musulmane (Desclée)
- 1991: Trois messagers pour un seul Dieu (Albin Michel)
- 1993: À la croisée des trois monothéismes (Albin Michel)
- 1998: Averroès (Balland)
- 1998: Révolte contre Jéhovah. Essai sur l'originalité de la Révélation chrétienne. (Éditions du Cerf)
- 2001: Chesterton, un penseur pour notre temps (Éditions de Paris,)
- 2002: L'homme selon le Coran (Hachette Littératures)
