= Dehellenization of Christianity =

Divorce of Christianity from Greek philosophy

Dehellenization is a term used in Catholicism to refer to the idea that Christianity should be divorced from its roots in ancient Greek philosophical thought.

The idea was proposed by the Canadian philosopher Leslie Dewart in his 1966 book The Future of Belief: Theism in a World Come of Age as a measure to counteract the progressive alienation of Catholic doctrine from the modern worldview, which Dewart believed was caused by Catholic theology's baneful dependence on antiquated and essentially pre-modern philosophical modes of thought.

Dehellenization was strongly rejected in 2006 by Pope Benedict XVI in a speech called Faith, Reason, and the University: Memories and Reflections (the Regensburg lecture). The speech advocates the harmony between faith and reason, arguing that Christianity is fundamentally a Hellenized religion.

== Hellenization ==
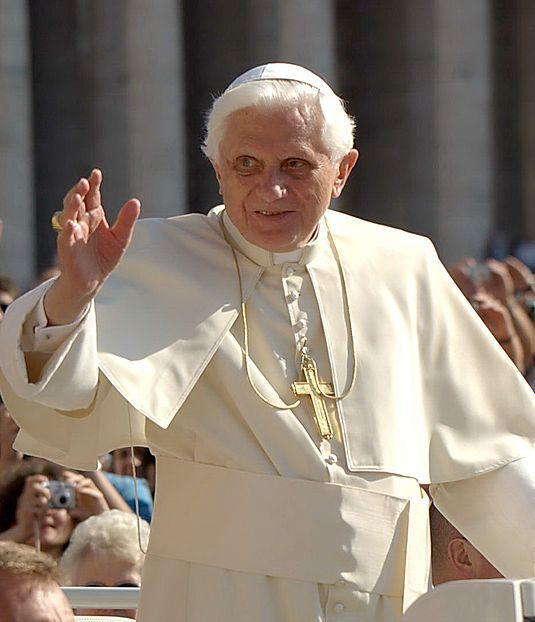
Pope Benedict XVI in 2009

Pope Benedict XVI (born Joseph A. Ratzinger) argues that several key ideas in Christian thought reveal the Hellenization of Christianity:

1. According to Benedict XVI, St. Paul's vision of the Macedonian man pleading with him to travel to Macedonia to help his people specifically foreshadows the necessary marriage of Biblical and Greek thought.
2. To demonstrate the fusion of Greek and Biblical thought, Benedict XVI refers to the opening verse of the gospel of John: "In the beginning was the word." Here "Word" translates the Greek word "logos" (λόγος), meaning not only "word" but also "reason", so the verse can be paraphrased as "in the beginning there was reason."
3. Benedict XVI also points to the concept of voluntarism, proposed by the Franciscan Blessed John Duns Scotus and developed by later scholars into the premise that we can only know God through a voluntary decision to do so.

Although Jesus's followers were reluctant to succumb to the Hellenistic rulers' attempts to force them into Greek idolatry and customs, Benedict XVI argues that they were nevertheless able to extract the most enriching element of Hellenistic thought, namely that man has not only the ability but also the obligation to think rationally.

== Causes of dehellenization ==
Pope Benedict XVI proposes that a dehellenization of Christianity has stemmed from three different sources. The first stage of Christian dehellenization can be attributed to the Reformation in the sixteenth century. Reformers believed that faith had turned into a mere element in abstract philosophy, and that the religion needed to return to the idea of sola scriptura (scripture only).

The second stage occurred in the nineteenth and twentieth centuries due to the theology of Adolf von Harnack. Harnack advocated focusing on the simple life of Jesus Christ, and his humanitarian message in particular. Theology and belief in a divine being, according to Harnack, was a scientific history completely separate from the modern reason of humanitarian aid.

The last stage, occurring currently in the twenty-first century, is a product of modern cultural pluralism. Cultural pluralism encourages other cultures to simply return to the simplicity of the New Testament, and infuse it with their own culture. Benedict XVI affirms that such a method cannot work because the New Testament "was written in Greek and bears the imprint of the Greek spirit."

== See also ==
- Christianity and Hellenistic philosophy
- Hellenocentrism
