= The Bear Creek School =

Private Christian school in Redmond, Washington, US

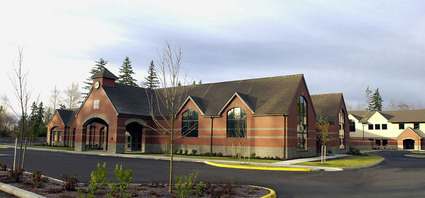

Location
- 8905 208th Ave NE; Redmond, Washington; USA; 47°40′52″N 122°03′56″W

Information
- Type: Private Christian (nondenominational)
- Motto: Credo ut intelligam
- Established: 1988
- Dean: Kevin Davison
- Headmaster: Patrick Carruth
- Faculty: 74
- Grades: Preschool–12
- Gender: Co-educational
- Enrollment: 841
- Colors: Forest Green, Gold, White
- Athletics: WIAA Emerald City League 1A
- Mascot: Titus the Grizzly
- Accreditation: Northwest Association of Independent Schools, Association of Christian Schools International
- Website: tbcs.org

The Bear Creek School is a preschool through grade twelve private school in Redmond, Washington. Educating around 840 students, the school is a non-denominational Christian religious school, focusing on college preparation. It was established in 1988. The head of school is Patrick Carruth. As of 2020, school review website Niche ranks The Bear Creek School as the best Christian high school, third best private K-12 school, and seventh best college prep private high schools in Washington state.

A long-term rival school of TBCS, in terms of athletics, is The Overlake School, also located in Redmond, Washington.

== Campuses ==
The Bear Creek School has three campuses in Redmond, Washington. The Main campus houses kindergarten through grade 8. The Upper School houses grades 9-12, and the third, or Valley Campus houses preschool and pre-k.

== Academics ==
In profiles of the school, The Bear Creek School was one of 50 private schools nationwide selected in the 2014 Blue Ribbon School of Excellence and the only school in the State of Washington, public or private, recognized by U.S. Secretary of Education Arne Duncan.

The Bear Creek School is accredited by the Northwest Commission of Colleges and Universities and the Northwest Association of Independent Schools. The school is also a member of the Association of Christian Schools International.

== Athletics ==
The school is a member of the Washington Interscholastic Activities Association (WIAA), participating as a member of the Emerald City 1A League and the CrossTown Middle School League. In 2014, The Bear Creek School opted up to the 1A classification. Numerous teams have won academic state titles.

== History ==
- 1988 - School founded by Drs. Nancy and William Price on the campus of Bear Creek Community Church, Woodinville, WA.
- 2000 - Redmond Campus is opened.
- 2005 - School acquires new Valley Campus to start a new K-6 campus, after leaving former Woodinville campus.
- 2006 - Nancy Price resigns from her position as the head of school to pursue mission work in Africa.
- 2006 - Karen Beman is appointed Interim Head of School.
- 2007 - The Board of Directors announces Patrick B. Carruth as the new head of school from July 1, 2007.
- 2015 -Upper school campus opens.

== School symbols ==
The school's original crest displays four symbols surrounding a cross: a book and pen signifying the arts; an atom, the sciences; a winged shoe, athletics; and an honor torch, personal character. Above the crest is the Latin motto of the School, Credo Ut Intelligam, which means, "I believe so that I may understand." A more recently updated crest shows a cross and a path. The cross represents the school's Christian foundation, while the path represents the path of life. The motto, chosen by the founders, is traceable to St. Anselm and St. Augustine before him.

== Notable faculty ==
- Stephen C. Meyer, vice president of the Discovery Institute, is a former board member.
