= Theodore Khoury =

Lebanese Catholic theologian (1930–2023)

Adel Theodor Khoury (26 March 1930 – 14 July 2023) was a Lebanese Catholic theologian and historian of Christianity and Islam.

== Biography ==
Adel Theodor Khoury was born in Tebnine, Lebanon on 26 March 1930. After theological studies Khoury entered priesthood in 1953. He also pursued philosophy and Oriental studies in Beirut before receiving a doctoral degree in Lyon. From 1970 until his retirement in 1993 Khoury was professor of general religious studies (Allgemeine Religionswissenschaft) in the Catholic-Theological Department of Westfälische Wilhelms-Universität Münster, Germany, where he twice served as head of the department.

Khoury is notable for his publications on Islam and his efforts toward interfaith understanding. In 1985 he was named advisor of the Pontifical Council for Interreligious Dialogue. In 1997 he was awarded the Austrian distinction "Grand Decoration of Honour" for his efforts to promote Christian-Muslim dialogue. His 12-volume commentary of the Quran (1990–2001) also won recognition in the Muslim world. His thematic concordance and German translation of the Quran was selected in Iran as "book of the year" in 2009.

Khoury was also known for his comprehensive surveys of Byzantine anti-Islamic polemics. His edition of dialogues of the Byzantine emperor Manuel II Palaiologos with an "educated Persian" gained wider attention when it was cited in a 2006 speech of Pope Benedict XVI which sparked worldwide controversy.

A Festschrift in honor of Khoury's 60th birthday was published in 1990.

In 2004, Khoury is said to have witnessed a miracle in Soufanieh, where Myrna Nazzour had stigmata.

Khoury died in Bonn, Germany on 14 July 2023, at the age of 93.

== Works ==
- Manuel Paléologue. Entretiens avec un Musulman, Introduction, texte critique, traduction et notes par Theodore Khoury, Editions du cerf, Paris 1966
- Les théologiens Byzantins et l’islam: Texts et auteurs (VIIIe-XIIIe siècles). Louvain, Belgium, and Paris:Nauwelaerts, 1969.
- Polémique Byzantine contre l’islam; VIIIe-XIIIe siècles. Leiden: Brill, 1972.
- Einführung in die Grundlagen des Islams. Graz, Wien, Köln: Styria 1978 ISBN 3-222-11126-X
- Apologétique Byzantine contre l’islam; VIIIe-XIIIe siècles. Altenberge, Germany: Verlag für christlich-islamisches Schriftum, 1982.
- Der Islam: sein Glaube, seine Lebensordnung, sein Anspruch. Freiburg im Breisgau; Basel; Wien: Herder 1988 u.ö. ISBN 3-451-04167-7
- (Ed.): Lexikon des Islam: Geschichte, Ideen, Gestalten. 3 Bde., 1. Aufl. 1991 ISBN 3-451-04036-0; überarbeitete Neuaufl. 1999 ISBN 3-451-04753-5; CD-ROM 2004 ISBN 3-89853-447-2
- (Hg.): Das Ethos der Weltreligionen. Freiburg im Breisgau; Basel; Wien: Herder 1993 ISBN 3-451-04166-9
- Christen unterm Halbmond: religiöse Minderheiten unter der Herrschaft des Islam. Freiburg im Breisgau; Basel; Wien: Herder 1994 ISBN 3-451-22851-3
- (Ed.): Kleine Bibliothek der Religionen. 10 Bde., Freiburg im Breisgau; Basel; Wien: Herder 1995-2001
- zus. m. Peter Heine und Janbernd Oebbecke: Handbuch Recht und Kultur des Islams in der deutschen Gesellschaft: Probleme im Alltag - Hintergründe - Antworten. Gütersloh: Gütersloher Verl.-Haus 2000 ISBN 3-579-02663-1
- Der Islam und die westliche Welt: religiöse und politische Grundfragen. Darmstadt: WBG; Primus 2001 ISBN 3-89678-437-4
- Mit Muslimen in Frieden leben: Friedenspotentiale des Islam. Würzburg: Echter 2002 ISBN 3-429-02455-2
- (Ed.): Krieg und Gewalt in den Weltreligionen: Fakten und Hintergründe. Freiburg im Breisgau; Basel; Wien: Herder 2003 ISBN 3-451-28245-3
- (Übersetzung und Kommentar): Der Koran: arabisch-deutsch. Gütersloh: Kaiser, Gütersloher Verl.-Haus 2004 ISBN 3-579-05408-2
- Der Koran: erschlossen und kommentiert von Adel Theodor Khoury. Düsseldorf: Patmos 2005 ISBN 3-491-72485-6 (Rezension bei H-Soz-u-Kult)
- (Ed.): Die Weltreligionen und die Ethik. Freiburg im Breisgau; Basel; Wien: Herder 2005 ISBN 3-451-05648-8
- Sufanieh: eine Botschaft für die Christen in der Welt. Altenberge: Oros 2005 ISBN 3-89375-212-9

== Literature ==
- Ludwig Hagemann; Ernst Pulsfort (ED.): "Ihr alle aber seid Brüder": Festschrift für A. Th. Khoury zum 60. Geburtstag. Würzburg: Echter; Altenberge: Telos 1990 ISBN 3-429-01303-8
