= Fides et ratio =

1998 papal encyclical by Pope John Paul II

Fides et ratio Latin for 'Faith and Reason' Encyclical of Pope John Paul II
- Signature date: 14 September 1998
- Subject: The relationship between faith and reason
- Number: 13 of 14 of the pontificate
- Text: In Latin; In English

Fides et ratio (Latin for 'Faith and Reason') is an encyclical promoted by Pope John Paul II on 14 September 1998. It was one of 14 encyclicals issued by John Paul II. The encyclical primarily addresses the relationship between faith and reason.

Cardinal Georges Cottier, who was secretary general of the International Theological Commission from 1989 to 2003, says he was part of the drafting of the encyclical.

== Content ==
Fides et ratio was the first encyclical since Pope Leo XIII's 1879 Aeterni Patris to address the relationship between faith and reason.

The encyclical posits that faith and reason are not only compatible but essential together. He starts with "Faith and reason are like two wings on which the human spirit rises to the contemplation of truth;" Faith without reason, he argues, leads to superstition. Reason without faith, he argues, leads to nihilism and relativism. He writes:

4 Through philosophy's work, the ability to speculate which is proper to the human intellect produces a rigorous mode of thought; and then in turn, through the logical coherence of the affirmations made and the organic unity of their content, it produces a systematic body of knowledge... [T]his has brought with it the temptation to identify one single stream with the whole of philosophy. In such cases, we are dealing with a "philosophical pride" that seeks to present its own partial and imperfect view as the complete reading of all reality....

Although reason creates a "systematic body of knowledge," the Pope avers, its completeness is illusory:

5 Yet the positive results achieved must not obscure the fact that reason, in its one-sided concern to investigate human subjectivity, seems to have forgotten that men and women are always called to direct their steps towards a truth that transcends them. Sundered from that truth, individuals are at the mercy of caprice, and their state as a person ends up being judged by pragmatic criteria based essentially upon experimental data, in the mistaken belief that technology must dominate all. It has happened therefore that reason, rather than voicing the human orientation towards truth, has wilted under the weight of so much knowledge and little by little has lost the capacity to lift its gaze to the heights, not daring to rise to the truth of being. Abandoning the investigation of being, modern philosophical research has concentrated instead upon human knowing. Rather than make use of the human capacity to know the truth, modern philosophy has preferred to accentuate the ways in which this capacity is limited and conditioned.

Without a grounding in spiritual truth, he continues, reason has:

5 ...given rise to different forms of agnosticism and relativism which have led philosophical research to lose its way in the shifting sands of widespread scepticism. Recent times have seen the rise to prominence of various doctrines which tend to devalue even the truths which had been judged certain. A legitimate plurality of positions has yielded to an undifferentiated pluralism, based upon the assumption that all positions are equally valid, which is one of today's most widespread symptoms of the lack of confidence in truth. Even certain conceptions of life coming from the East betray this lack of confidence, denying truth its exclusive character and assuming that truth reveals itself equally in different doctrines, even if they contradict one another. On this understanding, everything is reduced to opinion; and there is a sense of being adrift. While, on the one hand, philosophical thinking has succeeded in coming closer to the reality of human life and its forms of expression, it has also tended to pursue issues—existential, hermeneutical or linguistic—which ignore the radical question of the truth about personal existence, about being and about God. Hence we see among the men and women of our time, and not just in some philosophers, attitudes of widespread distrust of the human being's great capacity for knowledge. With a false modesty, people rest content with partial and provisional truths, no longer seeking to ask radical questions about the meaning and ultimate foundation of human, personal and social existence. In short, the hope that philosophy might be able to provide definitive answers to these questions has dwindled.

On the roles of philosophy and speculative theology as manifested by Augustine:

40. The Bishop of Hippo succeeded in producing the first great synthesis of philosophy and theology, embracing currents of thought both Greek and Latin. In him too the great unity of knowledge, grounded in the thought of the Bible, was both confirmed and sustained by a depth of speculative thinking. The synthesis devised by Saint Augustine remained for centuries the most exalted form of philosophical and theological speculation known to the West. Reinforced by his personal story and sustained by a wonderful holiness of life, he could also introduce into his works a range of material which, drawing on experience, was a prelude to future developments in different currents of philosophy.

On the wrong turns in modern philosophy and the duty of the magisterium:

49. The Church has no philosophy of her own nor does she canonize any one particular philosophy in preference to others... Yet history shows that philosophy—especially modern philosophy—has taken wrong turns and fallen into error. It is neither the task nor the competence of the Magisterium to intervene in order to make good the lacunas of deficient philosophical discourse. Rather, it is the Magisterium's duty to respond clearly and strongly when controversial philosophical opinions threaten right understanding of what has been revealed, and when false and partial theories which sow the seed of serious error, confusing the pure and simple faith of the People of God, begin to spread more widely.

50. In the light of faith, therefore, the Church's Magisterium can and must authoritatively exercise a critical discernment of opinions and philosophies which contradict Christian doctrine. It is the task of the Magisterium in the first place to indicate which philosophical presuppositions and conclusions are incompatible with revealed truth, thus articulating the demands which faith's point of view makes of philosophy.

In sum, the Pope "makes this strong and insistent appeal" that "faith and philosophy recover the profound unity which allows them to stand in harmony with their nature without compromising their mutual autonomy. The parrhesia of faith must be matched by the boldness of reason".

== See also ==
- Apophatic theology § The via eminentiae
- Credo ut intelligam
