= Christianity and ancient Greek philosophy =

Christianity and Hellenistic philosophies experienced complex interactions during the first to the fourth centuries.

As Christianity spread throughout the Hellenic world, an increasing number of church leaders were educated in Greek philosophy. The dominant philosophical traditions of the Greco-Roman world then were Stoicism, Platonism, Epicureanism, and, to a lesser extent, the skeptic traditions of Pyrrhonism and Academic Skepticism. Stoicism and, particularly, Platonism were often integrated into Christian ethics and Christian theology.

== Historic development ==
Christian engagement with Hellenistic philosophy is reported in the New Testament in Acts 17:18 describing the Apostle Paul's discussions with Epicurean and Stoic philosophers. Christian assimilation of Hellenistic philosophy was anticipated by Philo and other Greek-speaking Alexandrian Jews. Philo's blend of Judaism, Platonism, and Stoicism strongly influenced Christian Alexandrian writers such as Origen and Clement of Alexandria, as well as in the Latin world, Ambrose of Milan.

Clement of Alexandria, demonstrated Greek thought in writing,

"Philosophy has been given to the Greeks as their own kind of Covenant, their foundation for the philosophy of Christ ... the philosophy of the Greeks ... contains the basic elements of that genuine and perfect knowledge which is higher than human ... even upon those spiritual objects." (Stromata 6. 8)

The Church historian Eusebius suggested in his Praeparatio Evangelica that Greek philosophy, although in his view derivative, was concordant with Hebrew notions. Augustine of Hippo, who ultimately systematized Christian philosophy, wrote in the 4th and early 5th century,

But when I read those books of the Platonists I was taught by them to seek incorporeal truth, so I saw your 'invisible things, understood by the things that are made' (Confessions 7. 20).

John Burnet (1892) noted

The Neoplatonists were quite justified in regarding themselves as the spiritual heirs of Pythagoras; and, in their hands, philosophy ceased to exist as such, and became theology. And this tendency was at work all along; hardly a single Greek philosopher was wholly uninfluenced by it. In later days, Apollonios of Tyana showed in practice what this sort of thing must ultimately lead to. The theurgy and thaumaturgy of the late Greek schools were only the fruit of the seed sown by the generation which immediately preceded the Persian War.

== Conception of God ==
Commentary from Sir William Smith, Dictionary of Greek and Roman Biography and Mythology (1870, p. 620).

One, or unity, is the essence of number, or absolute number. As absolute number it is the origin of all numbers, and so of all things. (According to another passage of Aristotle, Met. xii. 6. p. 1080, b. 7. number is produced) This original unity they also termed God (Ritter, Gesch. der FML vol. i. p. 389). These propositions, however, would, taken alone, give but a very partial idea of the Pythagorean system. A most important part is played in it by the ideas of limit, and the unlimited. They are, in fact, the fundamental ideas of the whole. One of the first declarations in the work of Philolaus was, that all things in the universe result from a combination of the unlimited and the limiting; for if all things had been unlimited, nothing could have been the object of cognizance.

It was not until the fusion of Platonic and Aristotelian theology with Christianity that the concepts of strict omnipotence, omniscience, or benevolence became commonplace. The Platonic Theory of Forms had an enormous influence on Hellenic Christian views of God. In those philosophies, Forms were the ideals of every object in the physical world, and objects in the physical world were merely shadows of those perfect forms. Platonic philosophers were able to theorize about the forms by looking at objects in the material world, and imagining what the "Perfect" tree, or "Perfect" man would be. The Aristotelian view of God grew from these Platonic roots, arguing that God was the Infinite, or the Unmoved Mover.

Hellenic Christians and their medieval successors applied this form-based philosophy to the Christian God. Philosophers took all the things they considered good—power, love, knowledge, and size—and posited that God was 'infinite' in all these respects. They then concluded that God was omnipotent, omniscient, omnipresent, and omnibenevolent. Since God was perfect, any change would make Him less than perfect, so they asserted that God was unchanging, or immutable.

Anselm of Canterbury, a priest, monk, and philosopher defined God as the "Being than which no greater can be conceived." Almost 200 years later, Thomas Aquinas, in his Summa Theologiae, article 3, wrote succinctly: "By 'God', however, we mean some infinite good".

With the establishment of the formal church, the development of creeds and formal theology, this view of God as Omni-Everything became nearly universal in the Christian World.

== Ontological argument ==
Anselm of Canterbury composed the ontological argument for the existence of God, which he believed to be irrefutable. In essence, he argued that because God is, by definition, the being than which no greater can be conceived, and it is more perfect to exist than not to exist, God must exist. Conceiving God not to exist would be not conceiving God at all, as it would conceive a being less than perfect, which would not be God. Therefore, the argument proceeded, God could not be conceived not to exist.

The ontological argument is a defining example of the fusion of Hebrew and Greek thought. Philosophical realism was the dominant philosophical school of Anselm's day, and stemmed from Platonism. It held, in contrast to Nominalism, that things such as "green" and "big" were known as universals, which had a real existence in an abstract realm, as described by Plato. Accordingly, if a concept could be formed in the human mind, then it had a real existence in the abstract realm of the universals, apart from his imagination. In essence, if God could be imagined, God existed.

The ontological argument reflected the classical concept of "perfections." Size, intelligence, beauty, power, benevolence, and so forth—all these qualities are called perfections. What is more intelligent is more perfect in terms of intelligence; what is more beautiful is more perfect in terms of beauty, and so forth. Since existence was more perfect than non-existence, and God was, by definition, perfect, God existed by definition.

The Platonic concepts of realism, perfection and a god that defined as infinite thus became incorporated into Christian medieval philosophy.

== See also ==
- Constantinian shift
- Dehellenization of Christianity
- Hellenistic Judaism
- Jesus Christ the Logos
- Judaism and Christianity
- Neoplatonism and Christianity
- Neoplatonism and Gnosticism
- Pseudo-Dionysius the Areopagite
- Religio licita
- Timeline of Eastern Orthodoxy in Greece (33-717)
