= Regensburg lecture =

Lecture by Pope Benedict XVI in 2006

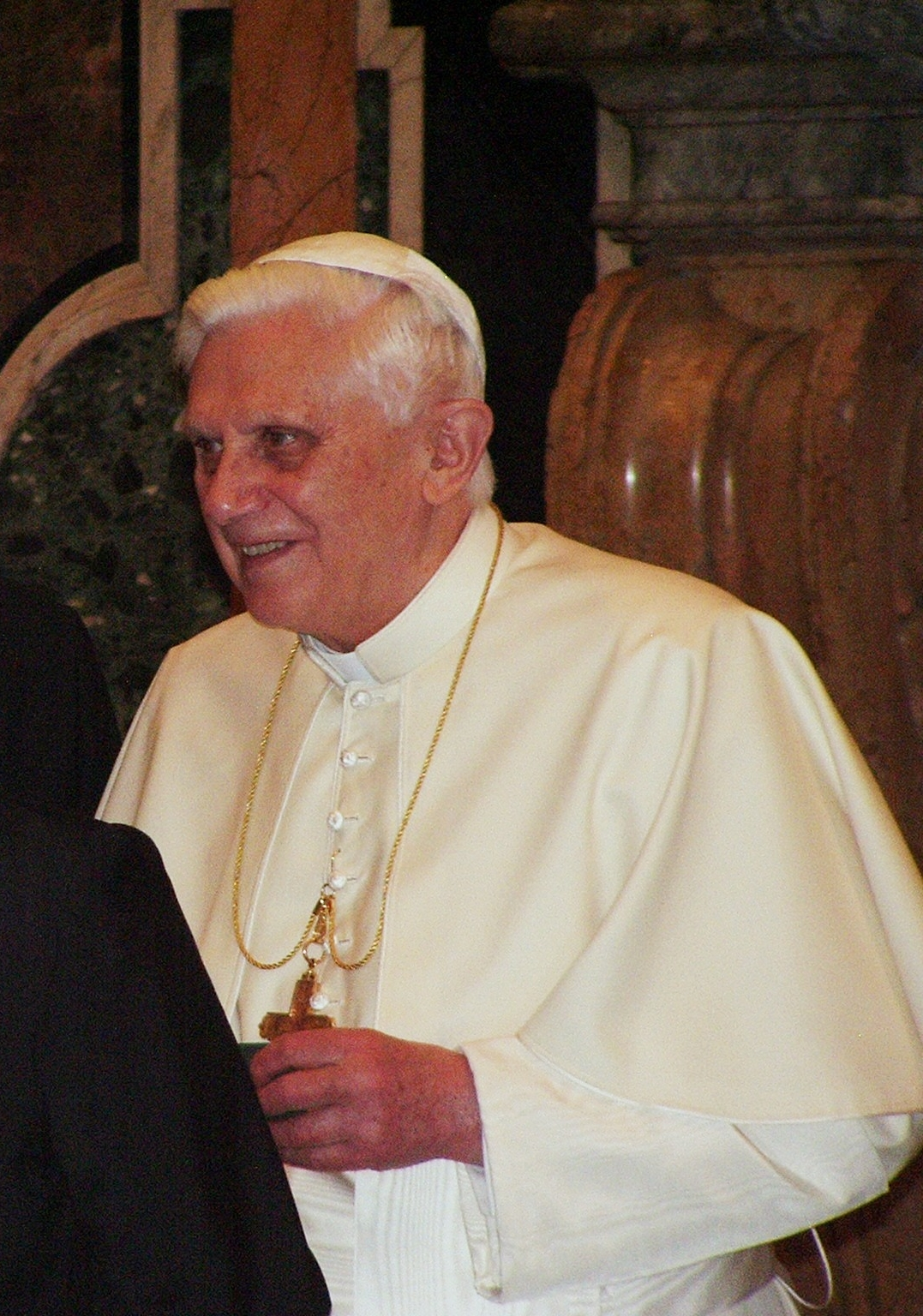
Pope Benedict XVI, January 2006

The Regensburg lecture or Regensburg address was delivered on 12 September 2006 by Pope Benedict XVI at the University of Regensburg in Germany, entitled "Faith, Reason and the University – Memories and Reflections" (German: Glaube, Vernunft und Universität – Erinnerungen und Reflexionen). The address was a source of international controversy for its criticism of Islam.

== Pope Benedict XVI's lecture ==
The lecture on faith and reason, with references ranging from ancient Jewish and Greek thinking to Protestant theology and modern secularity, focused mainly on Christianity and what Pope Benedict called the tendency to "exclude the question of God" from reason. Islam features in a part of the lecture: the Pope quoted a strong criticism of Islam, a criticism Pope Benedict disclaimed as being stated with an "unacceptable" "startling brusqueness, a brusqueness which leaves us astounded".

The author of this criticism was the Byzantine Emperor Manuel II Palaiologos (or Paleologus) in a 1391 dialogue with an "educated Persian" (who remained unnamed in all the dialogues), as well as observations on this argument made by Theodore Khoury, the scholar whose edition of the dialogue in question the pontiff was referencing. Pope Benedict used Manuel II's argument in order to draw a distinction between a Christian view, as expressed by Manuel II, that "not acting reasonably is contrary to God's nature", and an allegedly Islamic view, as explained by Khoury, that God transcends concepts such as rationality, and his will, as Ibn Hazm stated, is not constrained by any principle, including rationality, although it is known in Islamic thought that this does not imply the intended meaning as used by the editor.

As a part of his explication of this distinction, Pope Benedict referred to a specific aspect of Islam that Manuel II considered irrational, namely the practice of forced conversion. Specifically, the Pope (making clear that they were the Emperor's words, not his own) quoted Manuel II Palaiologos as saying: "Show me just what Muhammad brought that was new and there you will find things only bad and inhuman, such as his command to spread by the sword the faith he preached."

The pontiff was comparing apparently contradictory passages from the Qur'an, one being that "There is no compulsion in religion", the other being that it is acceptable to "spread the faith through violence". The pontiff argued the latter teaching to be unreasonable and advocated that religious conversion should take place through the use of reason. His larger point here was that, generally speaking, in Christianity, God is understood to act in accordance with reason, while in Islam, God's absolute transcendence means that "God is not bound even by his own word", and can act in ways contrary to reason, including self-contradiction. At the end of his lecture, the Pope said, "It is to the great logos, to this breadth of reason, that we invite our partners in the dialogue of cultures."

=== Paragraphs about Islam ===
In his lecture, the Pope, speaking in German, quoted a passage about Islam made at the end of the 14th century by Byzantine (Eastern Roman) emperor Manuel II Palaiologos. The controversial comment originally appeared in the seventh of the 26 Dialogues Held with a Certain Persian, the Worthy Mouterizes, in Anakara of Galatia, written in 1391 as an expression of the views of Manuel II, one of the last Christian rulers before the Fall of Constantinople to the Ottoman Empire in 1453, on such issues as forced conversion, holy war, and the relationship between faith and reason. The passage, in the English translation published by the Vatican, was:

Show me just what Muhammad brought that was new and there you will find things only evil and inhuman, such as his command to spread by the sword the faith he preached.

Many Islamic politicians and religious leaders protested against this passage the pope quoted, and which they perceived as an insulting mischaracterization of Islam. Mass street protests were mounted in many Islamic countries. The Pakistani parliament unanimously called on the Pope to retract "this objectionable statement".

The Pope maintained that the comment he had quoted did not reflect his own views, arguing that he was in agreement with the broader point about the importance of reason and non-violence that Manuel II developed later on in the text, but not with the characterisation of Islam as inherently evil or violent. His statement has been included as a footnote in the official text of the lecture available at Vatican website:

In the Muslim world, this quotation has unfortunately been taken as an expression of my personal position, thus arousing understandable indignation. I hope that the reader of my text can see immediately that this sentence does not express my personal view of the Qur’an, for which I have the respect due to the holy book of a great religion. In quoting the text of the Emperor Manuel II, I intended solely to draw out the essential relationship between faith and reason. On this point I am in agreement with Manuel II, but without endorsing his polemic.

Quoted below are the three paragraphs (of sixteen total) which discuss Islam in Pope Benedict's lecture:

I was reminded of all this recently, when I read the edition by Professor Theodore Khoury (Münster) of part of the dialogue carried on – perhaps in 1391 in the winter barracks near Ankara – by the erudite Byzantine emperor Manuel II Palaeologus and an educated Persian on the subject of Christianity and Islam, and the truth of both. It was presumably the emperor himself who set down this dialogue, during the siege of Constantinople between 1394 and 1402; and this would explain why his arguments are given in greater detail than those of his Persian interlocutor. The dialogue ranges widely over the structures of faith contained in the Bible and in the Qur'an, and deals especially with the image of God and of man, while necessarily returning repeatedly to the relationship between – as they were called – three "Laws" or "rules of life": the Old Testament, the New Testament and the Qur'an. It is not my intention to discuss this question in the present lecture; here I would like to discuss only one point – itself rather marginal to the dialogue as a whole – which, in the context of the issue of "faith and reason", I found interesting and which can serve as the starting-point for my reflections on this issue.

In the seventh conversation (διάλεξις – controversy) edited by Professor Khoury, the emperor touches on the theme of the holy war. The emperor must have known that surah 2, 256 reads: "There is no compulsion in religion". According to some of the experts, this is probably one of the suras of the early period, when Mohammed was still powerless and under threat. But naturally the emperor also knew the instructions, developed later and recorded in the Qur'an, concerning holy war. Without descending to details, such as the difference in treatment accorded to those who have the "Book" and the "infidels", he addresses his interlocutor with a startling brusqueness, a brusqueness that we find unacceptable, on the central question about the relationship between religion and violence in general, saying: "Show me just what Mohammed brought that was new, and there you will find things only evil and inhuman, such as his command to spread by the sword the faith he preached." The emperor, after having expressed himself so forcefully, goes on to explain in detail the reasons why spreading the faith through violence is something unreasonable. Violence is incompatible with the nature of God and the nature of the soul. "God", he says, "is not pleased by blood – and not acting reasonably (σὺν λόγω) is contrary to God's nature. Faith is born of the soul, not the body. Whoever would lead someone to faith needs the ability to speak well and to reason properly, without violence and threats ... To convince a reasonable soul, one does not need a strong arm, or weapons of any kind, or any other means of threatening a person with death ...".

The decisive statement in this argument against violent conversion is this: not to act in accordance with reason is contrary to God's nature. The editor, Theodore Khoury, observes: "For the emperor, as a Byzantine shaped by Greek philosophy, this statement is self-evident. But for Muslim teaching, God is absolutely transcendent. His will is not bound up with any of our categories, even that of rationality." Here Khoury quotes a work of the noted French Islamist R. Arnaldez, who points out that Ibn Hazm went so far as to state that God is not bound even by his own word, and that nothing would oblige him to reveal the truth to us. Were it God's will, we would even have to practice idolatry.

== Initial reactions ==
=== Political leaders ===
==== Africa ====
- Egypt – Foreign minister Ahmed Aboul Gheit said: "This was a very unfortunate statement and it is a statement that shows that there is a lack of understanding of real Islam. And because of this we are hopeful that such statements and such positions would not be stated in order to not allow tension and distrust and recriminations to brew between the Muslim as well as the west." The Vatican envoy was also summoned.
- Morocco – Morocco recalled its ambassador to the Vatican.

==== Americas ====
- United States – Secretary of State Condoleezza Rice praised the Pontiff's "love of humanity", and said: "We all need to understand that offense can sometimes be taken when perhaps we don't see it."

==== Asia ====
- Iran – The Guardian Council said the Pope was part of "a series of Western conspiracy against Islam" and had "linked Islam to violence and challenged Jihad at a time when he apparently closed his eyes to the crimes being perpetrated against defenseless Muslims by the leaders of power and hypocrisy under flag of Christianity and Jewish religion". President Mahmoud Ahmadinejad stated that "Regarding the issue of the Pope's comments, we respect the pope and all of those who are interested in peace and justice."
- Iraq – Government spokesman Ali al-Dabbagh said that "The Pope's remarks reflect his misunderstanding of the principles of Islam and its teachings that call for forgiveness, compassion and mercy", but also called on Iraqis not to harm "our Christian brothers".
- Indonesia – President Susilo Bambang Yudhoyono stated that the Pope's comments were "unwise and inappropriate", but also that "Indonesian Muslims should have wisdom, patience, and self-restraint to address this sensitive issue. ... We need them so that harmony among people is not at stake."
- Malaysia – Prime Minister Abdullah Ahmad Badawi said, "The Pope must not take lightly the spread of outrage that has been created. The Vatican must now take full responsibility over the matter and carry out the necessary steps to rectify the mistake."
- Pakistan – President Pervez Musharraf, in a speech at the United Nations, called for legislation against "defamation of Islam". Pakistan's parliament issued a statement, saying, "The derogatory remarks of the Pope about the philosophy of jihad and Prophet Muhammad have injured sentiments across the Muslim world and pose the danger of spreading acrimony among the religions." Pakistan's Foreign Ministry spokeswoman Tasneem Aslam said, "Anyone who describes Islam as a religion as intolerant encourages violence."
- Palestinian Authority – Hamas leader and Prime Minister Ismail Haniyeh condemned the Pope's remarks: "In the name of the Palestinian people, we condemn the pope's remarks on Islam. These remarks go against the truth and touch the heart of our faith." He also denounced the Palestinian attacks on churches in the West Bank and Gaza.
- Turkey – Prime Minister Recep Tayyip Erdoğan said: "I believe it is a must for [the Pope] to retract his erroneous, ugly and unfortunate remarks and apologise both to the Islamic world and Muslims. ... I hope he rapidly amends the mistake he has made so as not to overshadow the dialogue between civilizations and religions."
- Yemen – President Ali Abdullah Saleh threatened to sever diplomatic ties with the Vatican.

==== Australia ====
- Australia – Prime Minister John Howard backed the Pope's comments, saying that angry response from the Islamic world is "disproportionate, strange and disappointing". He also stated that Muslims should "move on", adding that, "I don't, at the moment, note terrorist groups killing people and invoking the authority of the Catholic Church".

==== Europe ====
- France – President Jacques Chirac warned against "anything that increases tensions between peoples or religions".
- Germany – Chancellor Angela Merkel said: "Whoever criticises the Pope misunderstood the aim of his speech ... It was an invitation to dialogue between religions and the Pope expressly spoke in favour of this dialogue, which is something I also support and consider urgent and necessary."
- Italy – Prime Minister Romano Prodi said: "There cannot be any controversy ... Religious dialogue and respect for every faith are essential today and religion does not justify any type of violence."
- Spain – Former Prime Minister José María Aznar, in response to the demonstrations asking the Pope to apologize, asked why Muslims had not apologized for occupying Spain for 800 years as Al-Andalus, and then called the Alliance of Civilizations initiative "stupid".
- Switzerland – Interior Minister Pascal Couchepin stated the Pope's speech was "intelligent and necessary".
- Vatican City – The director of the Vatican press office stated: "Pope Benedict's remarks about jihad may have been taken out of context but they were not an aberration. On the contrary, they stem from his thinking about Islam and the West in the one and a half years since he became Pope. It was certainly not the intention of the Holy Father to undertake a comprehensive study of the jihad and of Muslim ideas on the subject, still less to offend the sensibilities of Muslim faithful. Quite the contrary, what emerges clearly from the Holy Father’s discourses is a warning, addressed to Western culture, to avoid 'the contempt for God and the cynicism that considers mockery of the sacred to be an exercise of freedom'."

==== International ====
- The Organisation of the Islamic Conference said "The OIC hopes that this sudden campaign does not reflect a new trend for the Vatican policy toward the Islamic religion ... and it expects the Vatican to express its real vision of Islam", called it "character assassination of the Prophet Mohammed" and a "smear campaign", and asked the United Nations Human Rights Council to address the Pope's remarks.
- European Union – A European Commission spokesman objected to "picking quotes out of context", and said the commission would not "clarify or interpret" the speech, because they consider it "a theological contribution to a theological debate". He added that "reactions which are disproportionate and which are tantamount to rejecting freedom of speech are unacceptable."

=== Religious leaders ===
==== Catholic clergy ====
- Cardinal Jorge Mario Bergoglio, then Archbishop of Buenos Aires, Argentina, and later Pope Francis, reportedly expressed his "unhappiness" with Pope Benedict XVI's use of the quotation from Manuel II Palaeologos and stated: "Pope Benedict's statement[s] don't reflect my own opinions. ... These statements will serve to destroy in 20 seconds the careful construction of a relationship with Islam that Pope John Paul II built over the last twenty years."
- Cardinal Jean-Marie Lustiger said "We are faced with a media-driven phenomenon bordering on the absurd ... If the game consists in unleashing the crowd’s vindictiveness on words that it has not understood, then the conditions for dialogue with Islam are no longer met."
- Abbot Primate Notker Wolf, head of the worldwide Roman Catholic Benedictine Confederation of the Order of Saint Benedict, said that the Pope used Manuel's dialogue with a Persian to make an indirect reference to Iranian President Mahmoud Ahmadinejad. "I have heard he plans to write a letter to the Pope", Wolf added. "I think this would be a good opportunity to take up the gauntlet, so to speak, and really discuss things."
- Cardinal George Pell of Australia backed the Pope's comments, saying he did not "rule out the link between Islam and violence" and that "The violent reaction in many parts of the Islamic world justified one of Pope Benedict's main fears".
- Cardinal Secretary of State Bertone said: "Addressing the world's other religious faiths is part of the Church's mission ... We must all return to the original source of human life, which is love."

==== Other Christian clergy ====
- Shenouda III, the Coptic Pope of Alexandria, while admitting that he had not heard the exact words used by Pope Benedict XVI, said that "any remarks which offend Islam and Muslims are against the teachings of Christ".
- Rowan Williams, the Archbishop of Canterbury and head Anglican Primate of All England of the Anglican Communion, said: "There are elements in Islam that can be used to justify violence, just as there are in Christianity and Judaism."
- Former Archbishop of Canterbury George Carey dismissed Muslim charges that the Pope had "rubbished" Islam and stated that "Muslims, as well as Christians, must learn to enter into dialogue without crying 'foul'."
- R. Todd Wise, a Reformed Church in America minister and religious scholar, noted a heavy reliance on analogia entis rather than analogia fidei in Pope Benedict XVI's lecture, and suggested a priority for considering "faith as the common ground" in the approach to Islam.

==== Muslim ====
- On 13 October 2006, one month to the day after the lecture, 38 Islamic authorities and scholars from around the world, representing all denominations and schools of thought, joined together to deliver a response in the spirit of open intellectual exchange and mutual understanding, speaking about the "true" teachings of Islam.
- Exactly one year later, on 13 October 2007, 138 Muslim scholars, clerics and intellectuals declared the common ground between Christianity and Islam in A Common Word Between Us and You. The letter was addressed to the leaders of all the world’s churches, and to Christians everywhere.
- Ali Bardakoğlu, the head of the Religious Affairs Directorate of Turkey, commented that the Pope's statements "were extraordinarily worrying, very unfortunate, both in the name of Christianity, and in the name of shared humanity", and called on Pope Benedict to either retract or apologize for his conduct. He added "if there is a religious antagonism in the West, it's the responsibility of the logic-ignoring Christian Church [sic]", citing historical incidents of religious oppression in Europe and the Americas. He also implied that the Pope should consider cancelling his trip to Turkey that was originally planned for November 2006. Bardakoğlu later admitted to not having read the Pope's lecture before making his statements.
- Mohammed Mahdi Akef from the Muslim Brotherhood said the remarks "threaten world peace" and "pour oil on the fire and ignite the wrath of the whole Islamic world to prove the claims of enmity of politicians and religious men in the West to whatever is Islamic."
- Muhammad Sayyid Tantawy, Grand Sheikh of Al-Azhar University in Cairo, conveyed the university's position that the Pope's comments about Islam "indicate clear ignorance" of the religion and "attribute to Islam what it does not contain".
- Sheikh Yusuf al-Qaradawi, Egyptian Muslim cleric and head of Islamic Scholars' Association, said: "Our hands are outstretched and our religion calls for peace, not for war, for love not for hatred, for tolerance, not for fanaticism, for knowing each other and not for disavowing each other. We condemn this and we want to know the explanation of this and what is intended by this. We call on the pope, the pontiff, to apologise to the Islamic nation because he has insulted its religion and Prophet, its faith and Sharia without any justification."
- Ahmad Khatami, one of Iran's most influential clerics, asked the Pope to "fall on his knees in front of a senior Muslim cleric and try to understand Islam".
- Aga Khan IV, leader of the Nizari Ismaili branch of Islam said: "I have two reactions to the pope's lecture: There is my concern about the degradation of relations and, at the same time, I see an opportunity. A chance to talk about a serious, important issue: the relationship between faith and logic".
- Tariq Ramadan, an influential visiting fellow in the University of Oxford, said, "Most did not read the pope's speech; others had relied on a sketchy summary according to which the pope had linked Islam and violence ... certain groups or governments manipulate crises of this kind as a safety valve for both their restive populations and their own political agenda ... the mass protests ... end up providing a living proof that Muslims cannot engage in reasonable debate and that verbal aggression and violence are more the rule than the exception."

==== Jewish ====
- In a letter to the Muslim scholar Sheikh Yusuf al-Qaradawi, Sephardic Chief Rabbi Shlomo Amar criticized Benedict's remarks, writing: "our way is to honour every religion and every nation according to their paths, as it is written in the book of prophets: 'because every nation will go in the name of its Lord'." The Rabbi went on to denounce Islamic violence against Christians, stating that "Our Muslim brothers would add respect to their religion if they outdid themselves and overcame the feelings of humiliation."

=== Non-religious commentary ===
- A different view was taken by Christopher Hitchens, who wrote in "Fighting Words" for Slate web magazine that Pope Benedict "has managed to do a moderate amount of harm—and absolutely no good—to the very tense and distraught discussion now in progress between Europe and Islam." Hitchens also presented what he felt was a problem with the focus of the Pope's speech with respect to reason: "now its new reactionary leader has really 'offended' the Muslim world, while simultaneously asking us to distrust the only reliable weapon—reason—that we possess in these dark times. A fine day's work, and one that we could well have done without."
- In an article published in CounterPunch, author Tariq Ali said, "The Bavarian is a razor-sharp reactionary cleric. I think he knew what he was saying and why. In a neo-liberal world suffering from environmental degradation, poverty, hunger, repression, a 'planet of slums' (in the graphic phrase of Mike Davis), the Pope chooses to insult the founder of a rival faith. The reaction in the Muslim world was predictable, but depressingly insufficient."
- Hans Köchler, head of the Department of Philosophy at the University of Innsbruck and a leading advocate of civilizational dialogue, wrote in a commentary: "In his lecture preaching the compatibility of reason and faith, Benedict XVI, the scholar, deliberately overlooks the fact that the insights of Greek philosophy – its commitment to the λόγος – have been brought to medieval Christian Europe by the great Muslim thinkers of the Middle Ages. What he calls the 'encounter between the Biblical message and Greek thought' ... was, to a large extent, the result of the influence of Muslim philosophers – at a time when European Christians were totally ignorant of classical Greek philosophy."

== Subsequent Vatican statements ==
=== Official Vatican declaration ===
On 16 September 2006, Tarcisio Bertone, the Secretary of State of the Holy See, released a declaration explaining that the "position of the Pope concerning Islam is unequivocally that expressed by the conciliar document Nostra aetate" and that "the Pope's option in favour of inter-religious and inter-cultural dialogue is equally unequivocal."

As for the opinion of the Byzantine emperor Manuel II Paleologus which he quoted during his Regensburg talk, the Holy Father did not mean, nor does he mean, to make that opinion his own in any way. He simply used it as a means to undertake – in an academic context, and as is evident from a complete and attentive reading of the text – certain reflections on the theme of the relationship between religion and violence in general, and to conclude with a clear and radical rejection of the religious motivation for violence, from whatever side it may come. [The Pope] sincerely regrets that certain passages of his address could have sounded offensive to the sensitivities of the Muslim faithful and should have been interpreted in a manner that in no way corresponds to his intentions. [emphasis in original]

==== Response to official declaration ====
For many Muslim leaders, the declaration on 16 September was insufficient to rectify the situation. A representative for the Muslim Brotherhood rejected the Vatican statement, noting "Has he presented a personal apology for statements by which he clearly is convinced? No." Grand Mufti Abdul-Azeez ibn Abdullaah Aal ash-Shaikh, Saudi Arabia's highest religious authority, called the Pope's declaration "lies", adding that they "show that reconciliation between religions is impossible". On the other hand, the Muslim Council of Britain had a more favourable view of the declaration, issuing their own statement on 16 September that the Pope's expression of "sincere regret" was "a good first step".

=== Pope's Angelus remarks ===
On 17 September, before his regular weekly Sunday Angelus prayer, Pope Benedict XVI said:

At this time, I wish also to add that I am deeply sorry for the reactions in some countries to a few passages of my address at the University of Regensburg, which were considered offensive to the sensibility of Muslims. These in fact were a quotation from a medieval text, which do not in any way express my personal thought. Yesterday, the Cardinal Secretary of State published a statement in this regard in which he explained the true meaning of my words. I hope that this serves to appease hearts and to clarify the true meaning of my address, which in its totality was and is an invitation to frank and sincere dialogue, with great mutual respect.

==== Reactions to Angelus remarks ====
Benedict's remarks at his Angelus appearance initially received a mixed yet predominantly negative response. Mohammed Sayed Tantawi, Grand Imam of Al-Azhar Mosque, Cairo, a Sunni institution, stated, "We have no objection if the Pope holds another speech and declares publicly that what the Byzantine emperor had said was wrong. At the same time, the Pope has to apologize frankly and justify what he said". Mohammed Habib, deputy leader of the Muslim Brotherhood, Egypt's main Islamic opposition group originally, not long after the Pope's Sunday statements, called them a sufficient apology. However, later in the day, he retracted that statement, saying, "The Pope's comments that downplayed his earlier remarks are not enough. We will not accept anything less than an apology." Mohammed Habib also said: "It does not rise to the level of a clear apology and, based on this, we're calling on the Pope of the Vatican to issue a clear apology that will decisively end any confusion."

This sentiment was shared by the governments of Malaysia ("inadequate to calm the anger"), and Jordan ("a step forward", but "not sufficient"), by Turkish State Minister Mehmet Aydın ("you either have to say this 'I'm sorry' in a proper way or not say it at all. Are you sorry for saying such a thing or because of its consequences?") and scholar Yusuf al-Qaradawi, who called for a "peaceful international day of rage" on his popular TV show on Al Jazeera: "[The Pope's latest statements] were no apology. They were an accusation against Muslims that they didn't understand his words."

Later comments were more favourable of the Pope. Iranian President Mahmoud Ahmadinejad said: "We respect the Pope and all those interested in peace and justice", and said he accepted the Vatican view that the pontiff's words had been "misinterpreted" and "taken out of context". Malaysia’s Prime Minister Abdullah Ahmad Badawi said: "I suppose we could accept this. We hope that there would be no other statements that would anger Muslims." Ali Bardakoğlu, the head of Turkey’s Religious Affairs Directorate said that Benedict's "expression of sadness is a sign that he would work for world peace". Australian Muslim leader Ameer Ali said Australian Muslims must "accept the Pope's apology" over remarks that offended Islam and "move on". Filipino Muslims expressed support for Pope Benedict's apology and blamed certain media outlets for increasing the tensions between Muslims and Catholics.

=== Diplomatic initiative ===
On 25 September 2006, Pope Benedict XVI held an audience with Muslim diplomats, ambassadors of Muslim countries and members of the Consulta Islamica, the Italian government appointed consultative body on Islamic affairs. The meeting was an effort to mend relations with the Muslim community. Pope Benedict's spokesman, the Rev. Federico Lombardi, said the meeting at Castel Gandolfo, the Pope's summer residence, was "certainly a sign that dialogue is returning to normal after moments of ... misunderstanding."

During the session, Pope Benedict XVI reiterated his conviction that the dialogue between Muslims and Christians is "a vital necessity" for the good of a world marked by relativism, one that "excludes the transcendence and universality of reason". At this meeting, Pope Benedict expressed "all the esteem and the profound respect that [he has] for Muslim believers". Among the ambassadors invited were those from Iraq, Iran, Turkey, Morocco, as well as many other nations and Islamic groups.

=== English translation revision ===
Pope Benedict later released an updated translation of his original text that re-affirmed that the quotation from a 14th-century Byzantine emperor was not his personal opinion. The original translation said the emperor's remark was "with a startling brusqueness". The translation was corrected to better reflect the original German text, "in erstaunlich schroffer, uns überraschend schroffer Form ganz einfach." The corrected English translation referred to "a brusqueness that we find unacceptable." Pope Benedict added in a footnote:

In the Muslim world, this quotation has unfortunately been taken as an expression of my personal position, thus arousing understandable indignation. I hope that the reader of my text can see immediately that this sentence does not express my personal view of the Quran, for which I have the respect due to the holy book of a great religion.

He said he cited the text as part of an examination of the "relationship between faith and reason".

== Open letters from top Muslim clerics ==
On 12 October 2006, 100 Muslim scholars and clerics, including the Grand Muftis of Egypt, Russia, Bosnia, Kosovo, Turkey, Uzbekistan and Oman, as well as clerics and academics from the Middle East, Asia, North Africa, Europe and North America, published an open letter to the Pope. All the eight schools of thought and jurisprudence in Islam were represented by the signatories, but without representation of the influential Al-Azhar University in Cairo. The 38 signatories to the letter declared that they accepted the Pope's "personal expression of sorrow and assurance that the controversial quote did not reflect his personal opinion" and responded to some of the substantive issues raised in the Pope's treatment of a debate between the medieval Emperor Manuel II Palaiologos and an "educated Persian", including reason and faith; forced conversion; "jihad" vs. "holy war"; and the relationship between Christianity and Islam.

On 11 October 2007, one year after the release of the open letter to the Pope, a larger group of 138 Muslim scholars, clerics and intellectuals sent another open letter, titled "A Common Word Between Us and You", to Pope Benedict and the leaders of other Christian denominations. This letter emphasized that Christians and Muslims worship the same God, and share many values, including living in peace with one's neighbours.

== Protests, attacks and threats ==
Security was stepped up around and inside the Vatican City, because of concerns about the possibility of acts of violence. Thousands of people took part in various protests.

At least five churches were attacked by Palestinians in the West Bank and Gaza. In the West Bank city of Nablus, firebombings left black scorch marks on the walls and windows of the city's Anglican and Greek Orthodox churches. At least five firebombs hit the Anglican church and its door was later set ablaze. A group called the Lions of Monotheism claimed responsibility and said the attacks were carried out to protest the Pope's speech. Later that day, four masked gunmen doused the main doors of Nablus' Roman and Greek Catholic churches with lighter fluid, then set them ablaze before opening fire on both buildings. In Gaza City, terrorists opened fire from a car at a Greek Orthodox church, striking the facade. Explosive devices were set off at the same Gaza church on Friday, causing minor damage. There were no claims of responsibility for any of the three aforementioned attacks.

Several organizations, such as Al-Qaeda and the Mujahideen Shura Council threatened in a joint statement: "you and the West are doomed as you can see from the defeat in Iraq, Afghanistan, Chechnya, and elsewhere. ... We will break up the cross, spill the liquor and impose the jizya tax, then the only thing acceptable is a conversion (to Islam) or (being killed by) the sword. ... God enable us to slit their throats, and make their money and descendants the bounty of the Mujahideen."

Employees of Ankara's Diyanet İşleri Başkanlığı (Presidency of Religious Affairs), the state body that organizes Muslim worship in Turkey, asked the authorities on 19 September to open legal proceedings against Pope Benedict XVI and to arrest him when he visits the country in November 2006. They said the Pontiff had violated Turkish laws upholding freedom of belief and thought by "insulting" Islam and Muhammad.

The Lashkar-e-Taiba in Pakistan has issued a fatwā asking the Muslim community to kill Pope Benedict for his "blasphemous statement" about Muhammad.

=== Murder of Sister Leonella Sgorbati ===
On 17 September 2006, two Somali gunmen shot and killed a 65-year-old Italian nun, Sister Leonella Sgorbati, working at the Austrian-run children's hospital in the city of Mogadishu along with her Somali bodyguard. A senior Somali Islamist, speaking on condition of anonymity, said: "There is a very high possibility the people who killed her were angered by the Catholic Pope's recent comments against Islam"; however, no specific evidence was provided for the motive. Sheikh Mukhtar Robow, member of the Islamic Courts Union, said there was a "concrete possibility" that the murder of the nun was "a reprisal for the Pope's remarks on Islam".

=== Attacks on Christians in Iraq ===
In Iraq, the flags of Germany, Israel, and the United States, and Christian crosses and effigies of Pope Benedict were burned in Basra.

Iraq has one of the largest Christian minorities in the Middle East, where Assyrians number about one million. After the Pope's comments, several churches were bombed; however, many were being bombed before the Pope's comments starting with the US invasion in 2003 in the power vacuum created by the fall of Saddam Hussein. A previously unknown Baghdad-based group, Kataab Ashbal Al Islam Al Salafi (Islamic Salafist Boy Scout Battalions) threatened to kill all Christians in Iraq if the Pope did not apologize to Muhammad within three days. Christian leaders in Iraq asked their parishioners not to leave their homes, after two Christians were stabbed and killed in Baghdad.

There were reports of writing on church doors stating, "If the Pope does not apologise, we will bomb all churches, kill more Christians and steal their property and money."

The Iraqi militia Jaish al-Mujahedin (Holy Warriors' Army) announced its intention to "destroy their cross in the heart of Rome… and to hit the Vatican."

Despite the Pope's comments dying down in the media, attacks on Assyrian Christians continued, and on 9 October, an Islamic extremist group kidnapped priest Ameer Iskander in Mosul. His body was found three days later, decapitated. His relatives said that his Muslim captors had demanded that his church condemn the Pope's comments about Islam (which it already had) and pay a $350,000 ransom.

== Statements about Qur'an chapter 2 ==
Another point of controversy, widely covered in Arabic media, but much less so in Western media, was the Pope's assessment that Sura 2 in the Qur'an, which includes the verse "There is no compulsion in religion", was "one of the suras of the early period, when Muhammad was still powerless and under threat", and that instructions "concerning holy war" had come later.

Many scholars of Islam took this as a classification of the sura as stemming from the earlier Meccan period and argued that the Pope was mistaken by pointing out that Surah 2 was revealed in various stages and that this verse was revealed after Muhammad's hijra from Mecca, during his period of stay in Medina, and hence is from the Medinan period, which was the final stage of the revelation of the Qur'an when the Muslims were becoming numerous and increasingly powerful and safe from the immediate dangers that had overshadowed them for 13 years in Mecca. The scholars also pointed out that the Pope had failed to mention that even if this verse was revealed when the Muslims were weak, they could have easily abrogated it with another verse which gave them permission to forcefully convert people once they finally conquered Mecca; this, however, did not happen. Critics also pointed out the hypocrisy in his statement, since Christianity itself has a long history of forced conversions.

== Assessment of the lecture's purpose ==
In contrast to the Jyllands-Posten Muhammad cartoons controversy, the media focus was not on the issues of free speech or injured religious sensitivities. Underlying the widely talked about question of whether or not the Pope should apologize, and whether or not his subsequent statements even constituted an apology, several competing and separate interpretations of his intentions were proffered. These are, broadly and in no particular order:

- The lecture was claimed by many Catholic apologists to not be directed at Islam at all and the incendiary passages were purely circumstantial to the lecture's real intention, which was to counter the demotion of theology in the university environment in particular and of faith in a society plagued by postmodern relativism and irrationality in general. (Note: However, observers note that the Pope insisted on keeping such comments in his speech even after his handlers advised him against it. According to Israeli analyst Uri Avnery, this "quote serves exactly the requirements of .... George Bush II. He, too, wants to unite the Christian world against the mainly Muslim 'Axis of Evil'. Moreover, the Turks are again knocking on the doors of Europe, this time peacefully. It is well known that the Pope supports the forces that object to the entry of Turkey into the European Union." The Pope had actually called for allowing Turkey into the European Union and spoke against the US invasion of Iraq. Moreover, this non-Christian analyst cited above, Uri Avnery, fails to understand that Catholics and Evangelicals are philosophically fundamentally different and disagree on many issues. The blatantly false comment by Uri Avnery could also be seen as an attempt to ignore the deeply seated conflict in the Islamic world with Israel and blame everything on the Pope, who has not commanded a military force in nearly 500 years.)
- Pope Benedict's lecture was a "calculated risk", a move designed to win the hearts of the Christians of the Eastern Orthodox Church who are surrounded by Muslims and whom Pope Benedict would be visiting in November 2006. Given what he saw as close theological affinities between these two churches and other personal characteristics specific to Pope Benedict (traditional liturgy; criticism of historical-critical approach to biblical studies), "some form of reunion is not only feasible; from Benedict's point of view, it is highly desirable."
- Graham Macaleer, professor of philosophy at Loyola University Maryland, has written that Pope Benedict XVI's Regensburg Address was a commentary on the book Analogia Entis by Erich Przywara. "Where the logic of law is either equivocal [e.g., as in Islam] or univocal [e.g., as in secular law of the Enlightenment], terror ensues."

== See also ==
- Faith and rationality
- Catholic–Muslim Forum
- A Common Word Between Us and You
- Lars Vilks Muhammad drawings controversy
