= Credo ut intelligam =

Sentence of Anselm of Canterbury

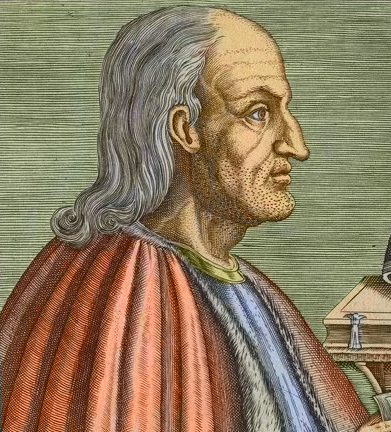
Colorized portrait of Anselm of Canterbury.

Credo ut intelligam, alternatively spelled credo ut intellegam, is a Latin sentence of Anselm of Canterbury (Proslogion, 1). The sentence is a reference to Isaiah 7:9. The sentence translates as: "I believe so that I may understand".

In Anselm's writing, it is placed in juxtaposition to its converse, intellego ut credam ("I think so that I may believe"), when he says Neque enim quaero intelligere ut credam, sed credo ut intelligam ("I do not seek to understand in order that I may believe, but rather, I believe in order that I may understand").

The phrase credo ut intelligam is often associated with Anselm's other famous phrase fides quaerens intellectum ("faith seeking understanding").

The phrase is based on a sentence of Augustine of Hippo (crede ut intellegas, lit. "believe so that you may understand") to relate faith and reason. Augustine understood the saying to mean that a person must believe in something in order to know anything about God. This sentence by Augustine is also inspired from Isaiah 7:9.

== See also ==
- Apophatic theology § The via eminentiae
- Credo quia absurdum
